= Vulgate manuscripts =

Manuscripts of the Vulgate

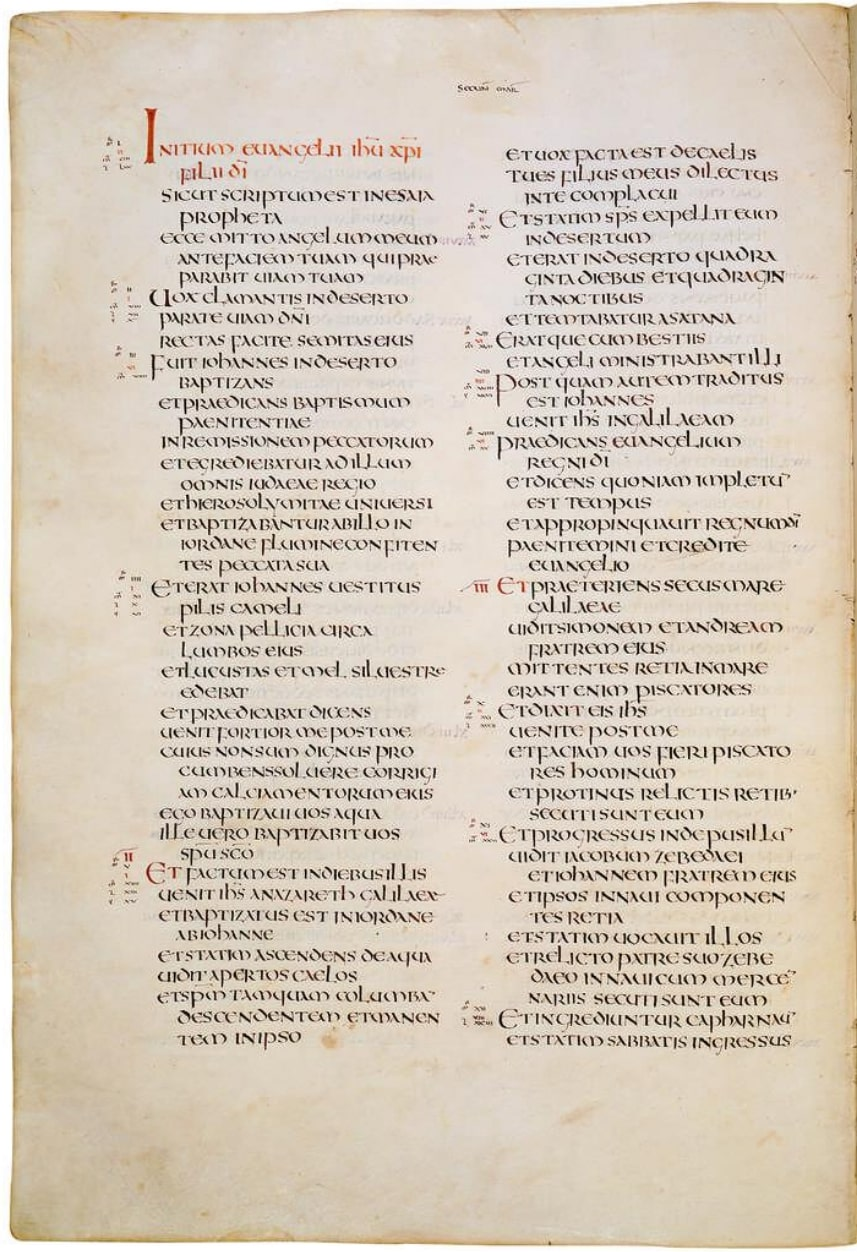
Beginning of the Gospel of Mark on a page from the Codex Amiatinus.

The Vulgate (/ˈvʌlɡeɪt, -ɡət/) is a late-4th-century Latin translation of the Bible, largely edited by Jerome, which functioned as the Catholic Church's de facto standard version during the Middle Ages. The original Vulgate produced by Jerome around 382 has been lost, but texts of the Vulgate have been preserved in numerous manuscripts, albeit with many textual variants.

Vulgate manuscripts differ from Vetus Latina manuscripts, which are handwritten copies of the earliest Latin-language Bible translations known as the "Vetus Latina" or "Old Latin", originating from multiple translators before Jerome's late-4th-century Vulgate. Vetus Latina and Vulgate manuscripts continued to be copied alongside each other until the Late Middle Ages; many copies of (parts of) the Bible have been found using a mixture of Vetus Latina and Vulgate readings. Manuscripts of the Vulgate, together with the Codex Vaticanus, formed the basis of the printed Sixto-Clementine Vulgate in 1592, which became the Catholic Church's officially promulgated Latin version of the Bible.

== History ==
Though the Vulgate exists in many forms, a number of early manuscripts containing or reflecting the Vulgate survive today. Dating from the 8th century, the Codex Amiatinus is the earliest surviving manuscript of the complete Vulgate Bible. The Codex Fuldensis, dating from around 547, contains most of the New Testament in the Vulgate version, but the four gospels are harmonized into a continuous narrative derived from the Diatessaron.

Alcuin of York oversaw efforts to make an improved Vulgate, which most argue he presented to Charlemagne in 801. He concentrated mainly on correcting inconsistencies of grammar and orthography, many of which were in the original text. More scholarly attempts were made by Theodulphus, Bishop of Orléans (787?–821); Lanfranc, Archbishop of Canterbury (1070–1089); Stephen Harding, Abbot of Cîteaux (1109–1134); and Deacon Nicolaus Maniacoria (mid-12th century). The University of Paris, the Dominicans, and the Franciscans following Roger Bacon assembled lists of correctoria; approved readings where variants had been noted.

== List of manuscripts ==
=== Old Testament ===
List of some manuscripts from the Stuttgart Vulgate (officially known as Biblia Sacra iuxta vulgatam versionem) with siglum from the same source; no name means the Stuttgart Vulgate did not give it a name, no provenance means the Stuttgart Vulgate did not give it a provenance:

Old Testament manuscripts sigla per Biblia Sacra iuxta vulgatam versionem
Sigla	Name	Approx. date	Prov.	Content	Custodian
D	—	8th century	Lugdunum	Sam, Rg, Pa	Municipal Lib. of Lyon
D	—	8th century	Northumbria	Job	Russian National Lib.
F	—	8th century	Gaul	Deut–Ruth	National Lib. of France
F	Psalt. Corbeiense triplex	8th century	—	Ps (G&H)	Russian National Lib.
G	Pentateuchus Turonensis	6th-7th century	—	Gen–Num	National Lib. of France
G	Sangermanensis	9th century	—	Par, Esr, Est, Prv, Sap, Sir	National Lib. of France
H	Cathach S. Columbae	7th century	Hibernia	Psalms (G)	Royal Irish Academy
I	—	10th century	—	Ps (G&H)	Municipal Lib. of Rouen
K	—	8th century	Italia	Ezra–Job	Cathedral Lib. of Cologne
K	Psalt. Augiense triplex	9th century	Augia	Ps (G&H)	Baden State Library
L	—	9th century	Würzburg	Deut–Ruth	Bodleian Library
L	—	9th century	Lugdunum	Ezra	Municipal Lib. of Lyon
L	Laureshamensis	6th-7th century	Italia merid.	Tobit–Job	Vatican Library
L	Psalt. Lugdunense	5th-6th century	Lugdunum	Psalms (G)	Municipal Lib. of Lyon + National Lib. of France
L	—	9th century	Tours	Psalms (H)	British Library
M	Maurdramni	8th century	Corbie	Ios–Rt, Dn–Mal, Mcc, Prv–Sir, Ez	Municipal Lib. of Amiens

=== New Testament ===
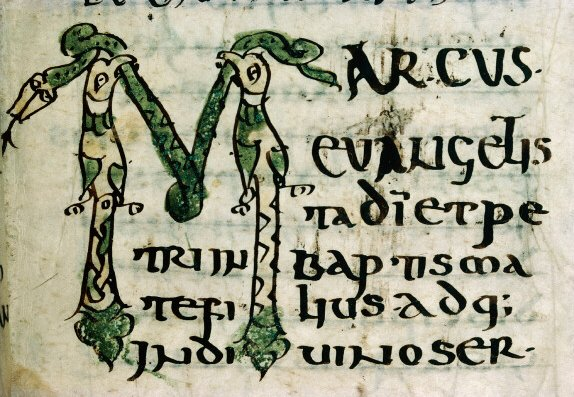
Vulgate of Mark 1:1ff in an illuminated manuscript held at Autun

The list of manuscripts below is based on citations in Novum Testamentum Graece (NA27) and The Greek New Testament (UBS4). Each manuscript is identified first by its siglum (the first column, s., in the table), as given by the critical apparatus of the editions mentioned. These sigla are related to content, so are not unique. For example, the letter S refers to Codex Sangallensis 1395 in the gospels, but to Codex Sangallensis 70 in the Pauline epistles. So sigla need disambiguation. In the table below, this is done by providing a full name. Additionally, the standard unique serial number for each manuscript is provided.

Certain Latin NT manuscripts may present a mixture of Vulgate and various Vetus Latina texts. For example, Codex Sangermanensis (g^{1} / VL6) is Vetus Latina in sections of the Gospels and Acts, but Vulgate in the Pauline Epistles and Revelation.

New Testament manuscripts sigla per Novum Testamentum Graece, The Greek New Testament, and H.A.G Houghton's The Latin New Testament
Sigla	Name	Date	Contents	Custodian	City, state	Country
A	Codex Amiatinus	716	NT	Laurentian Library	Florence	Italy
C	Codex Cavensis	850	Gosp–Paul; Rev	Archivio della Badia della Santissima Trinità	Cava de' Tirreni	Italy
D	Codex Durmachensis	650	Gospels	Trinity College, Dublin	Dublin	Ireland
F	Codex Fuldensis	541–546	NT	Hochschul- und Landesbibliothek Fulda	Fulda	Germany
G	Codex Sangermanensis	850	NT	BnF	Paris	France
I	Codex Iuvenianus, Codex Vallicellianus	700–800	Acts, Catholic Epistles, Revelation	Biblioteca Vallicelliana B.25^{II}(in Italian)	Rome	Italy
K	Codex Aug. perg. 185	850	Paul and Catholic Epistles	Baden State Library	Karlsruhe	Germany
L	Lectionarium Luxoviense	700	General			
M	Codex Mediolanensis	550	Gospels			
N	—	450	Gospels	Bibliothèque Municipale; National Library of France	Autun; Paris	France
P	Codex Spalatensis	600	Gospels			
R	Codex Reginensis	750	Paul	Vatican Library	Vatican City	Vatican City
R	—	600	General	Biblioteca Capitolare	Verona	Italy
S	Codex Sangallensis 1395	450	Gospels	Abbey of St. Gall	St. Gallen	Switzerland
S	Codex Sangallensis 2	750	Acts; Rev	Abbey of St. Gall	St. Gallen	Switzerland
S	Codex Sangallensis 70	750	Paul	Abbey of St. Gall	St. Gallen	Switzerland
S	Codex Sangallensis 907	750	General	Abbey of St. Gall	St. Gallen	Switzerland
T	Codex Toletanus	950	Old Testament–NT	National Library of Spain	Madrid	Spain
Z	Codex Harleianus	550	Gospels	British Library	London	United Kingdom
Θ	Codex Theodulphianus	950	Old Testament–NT	Bibliothèque nationale de France	Paris	France
Λ	Codex Legionensis	650	Acts–Rev	St. Isidore's Basilica	León	Spain
	Codex Complutensis I	927	Old Testament–NT	Bibl. Univ. Centr. 31	Madrid	Spain
11A	Cod. M. p. th. f. 67		Gospels	University of Würzburg	Würzburg	Germany

=== Complete bibles ===
Complete bibles manuscripts sigla per Biblia Sacra iuxta vulgatam versionem, Novum Testamentum Graece and The Greek New Testament
Sigla	Name	Approx. date	Prov.	Content	Custodian
A	Amiatinus	8th century	Northumbria	Bible	Laurentian Library
C	Cavensis	9th century	Hispania	Bible without Cath	Monte Cassino
C	Codex Complutensis I	927	Madrid	Bible	Bibl. Univ. Centr. 31
T	Codex Toletanus	950	Madrid	Bible	National Library of Spain
Θ	Codex Theodulphianus	950	Paris	Bible	Bibliothèque nationale de France

== See also ==
- Biblical manuscript
- Septuagint manuscripts
- List of the Dead Sea Scrolls
- List of Hebrew Bible manuscripts
- Vetus Latina manuscripts
