= Early translations of the New Testament =

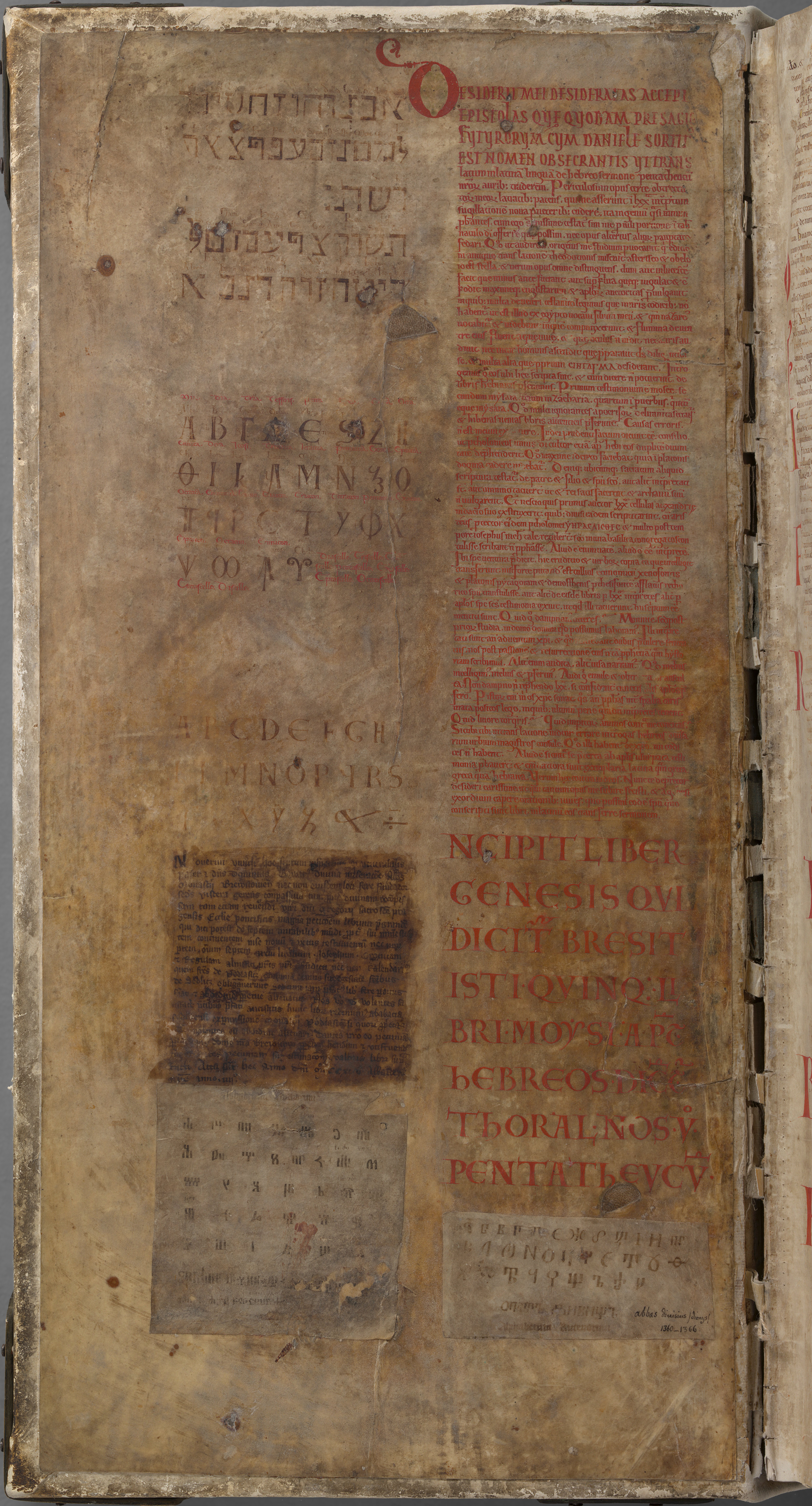
The first page of the Codex Gigas, with biblical alphabets: Hebrew, Greek and Latin. In addition: Ethiopic and Coptic

Early translations of the New Testament – translations of the New Testament created in the 1st millennium. Among them, the ancient translations are highly regarded. They play a crucial role in modern textual criticism of the New Testament's text. These translations reached the hands of scholars in copies and also underwent changes, but the subsequent history of their text was independent of the Greek text-type and are therefore helpful in reconstructing it. Three of them – Syriac, Latin, Coptic – date from the late 2nd century and are older than nearly all of the surviving Greek manuscripts of the New Testament. They are cited in all critical editions of the Greek text-type. Translations produced after 300 (Armenian, Georgian, Ethiopic) are later but are nevertheless very important and are generally cited in the critical apparatus. The Gothic and Slavic translations are rarely cited in critical editions. Omitted are those of the translations of the first millennium that were not translated directly from the Greek original, but based on another translation (based on the Vulgate, Peshitta and others).

Translations from the second half of the first millennium are less important than ancient translations for reconstructing the original text of the New Testament, because they were written later. Nevertheless, they are taken into account; it may always happen that they convey any of the lessons of Scripture better than the ancient translations. Textual critics are primarily interested in which family of the Greek text-type they support. Therefore, they cannot be ignored when reconstructing the history of the New Testament. Among the translations of the first millennium, the Persian and Caucaso-Albanian translations are completely lost.

In the 27th edition of Nestle–Åland's Greek New Testament (NA27), the critical apparatus cites translations into the following languages: Latin (Old Latin and Vulgate), Syriac, Coptic dialects (Sahidic, Bohairic, Akhmimite, Sub-Ahmimite, Middle Egyptian, Middle Egyptian Faihumic, Protobohairic), Armenian, Georgian, Gothic, Ethiopian, Church Slavonic. Omitted are translations into Arabic, Nubian, Sogdian, Old English, Old Low German, Old High German, Old French.

== Syriac translations ==
=== Old Syriac translations ===
Syria played a great role in the beginnings of Christianity. In the first century AD, Antioch was an important missionary center, while in the 2nd century it served as a cultural bridge between the Near East and Europe. The disciples of Jesus were first called Christians in Antioch (Acts 11:26). This is likely where the Gospels of Matthew and Luke were written, as well as the Didache, the Ignatian in 107 AD, and the Gospel of Thomas in the late 2nd century. In Syria, Greek and Syriac language influences crossed. In Antakya itself, Greek was dominant, but outside of it (Damascus, Edessa) there was much less knowledge of Greek. As time went on, the influence of Greek diminished. In Palestine, a dialect of Syriac was spoken, close to the Aramaic language, i.e. the one spoken by Jesus and the apostles, while the first Syriac translations were produced at a time when the oral tradition about Jesus and the apostles was still alive. The key terminology of apostolic teaching could not yet be forgotten, and to some extent could be preserved in the earliest translations. The Syriac translations provide a better understanding of the New Testament's authors, who wrote in Greek but were thinking in Semitic. This is why textual critics have a special respect for the Syriac translations.

The history of Syriac translations has been the subject of a lot of research and still seems very complicated. The oldest translation of the New Testament into Syriac is probably the Diatessaron (Harmony of the Four Gospels), made by Tatian around 170. Tatian created his own chronological order, in some places radically diverging from the chronology of each of the Gospels. Repetitive texts were discarded, resulting in the Diatessaron accounting for 72% of the total volume of the four Gospels. Tatian made the greatest use of the Gospel of John, the least use of the Gospel of Mark. The 56 canonical verses of the Gospels do not find their counterparts in the Diatessaron. The genealogies of Jesus are omitted, as well as the texts that speak of Christ's humanity, and Joseph is not called Mary's husband. Nor is there a Pericope adulterae (John 7:53-8:11). It represents a Western text-type. Old Testament citations follow the Peshitta text-type. It is preserved in Arabic and Latin translations; only fragments are preserved in Greek.

Another translation – this time of the entire New Testament – was made around 180 (or not much earlier). It is quoted by Ephrem the Syrian. It is called the Old Syriac translation, and was made from an old Greek text-type representing the Western text-type. It is preserved only in two early manuscripts: the Curetonian (4th century) and the Sinaitic (5th century). The former was published by William Cureton in 1858 and is marked syr^{cur}, while the latter was discovered by A.S. Lewis in 1892 in Sinai, is marked syr^{sin} and is a palimpsest. The manuscripts probably transmit a text close to that of about 200. Both manuscripts contain the Gospels themselves, and in them some gaps. The Old Syriac translation of Paul's Epistles has not survived. Science knows it only from the quotations of the Eastern Church Fathers.

=== Peshitta ===
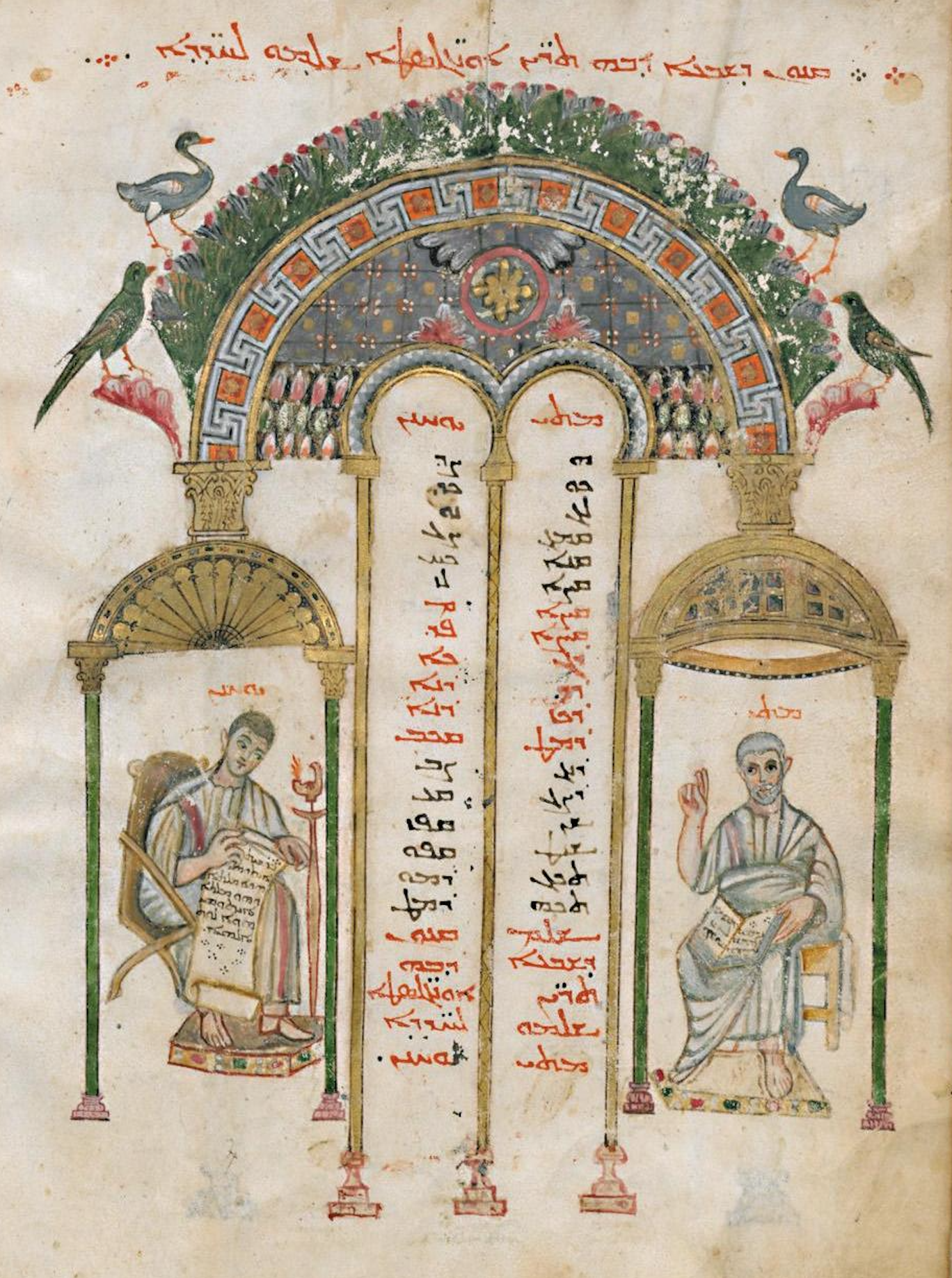
Rabbula Gospels

At the beginning of the fifth century, all the NT books (with the exception of 2 Peter, 2 John, 3 John, Jude, Revelation) were re-translated, perhaps to blur the differences that existed between the various existing translations. The Peshitta is designated by the symbol syr^{p}.

Until the late 19th century, it was thought that the Peshitta was written in the 2nd century. After Burkitt's publication, most biblical scholars agreed that this work was done by Bishop Rabbula of Edessa (d. 436). Rabbula's authorship is questionable, however, because the quotations that appear in his writings do not always agree with the Peshitta. It was not until the 10th century that the translation was called the Peshitta (pešitto – simple, ordinary), by Moshe bar Kefa, because it was translated into colloquial, ordinary language (to make it accessible to everyone). The Peshitta contained 22 books of the NT (lacking 2 Peter, 2 and 3 John, Jude, Revelation), and did not include the texts of Luke 22:17-18; John 7:53 – 8:11. The Peshitta became the translation in force in the Syriac Church, both Eastern and Western, and this means that it was written before the schism of 431. The text-type of the Peshitta was published in print in 1555 in Venice. An edition of the critical text of the Peshitta is being compiled in Leiden.

The text-type of the Peshitta is heterogeneous, the Gospels generally represent the Byzantine text-type, and some parts of Acts represent the Western text-type, with numerous infiltrations of the Alexandrian text-type (e.g., Matthew 14:12; 15:4; Mark 1:2; John 1:18) and the Caesarean text-type. G.H. Gwilliam has shown that in Matthew 1-14 the Peshitta agrees with the Textus Receptus only 108 times, with the Codex Vaticanus 65 times, in 137 cases it differs from both and supports either Old Syriac or Old Latin translations, and in 31 cases it has its own variants. In the Gospel of Mark, the text does not follow either the Alexandrian, Western or Caesarean traditions. Hope Broome Dows examined 135 selected variants of the Gospel of Mark. 48.9% of these variants were consistent with the Byzantine text, 29.1% with the Western text. Many of the variants in Mark's Gospel are consistent with the Old Syriac translation. This research refuted the circulating opinion that Peshitta conveys the Byzantine text. In the Acts of the Apostles, it transmits many Western variants.

More than 300 Peshitta manuscripts have survived, almost half of which are in the British Library. The other significant collection of manuscripts is in Cambridge. Most of these manuscripts are written in Syriac alphabet. More important manuscripts:

- Paris syr. MS. 296, I°, containing Luke 6:49 – 21:37, dating back to the 5th century and considered the oldest manuscript of the Peshitta.
- Vatican Cod. Sir. 12, written in Edessa in 548; the oldest dated manuscript containing the four Gospels.
- Codex Phillipps 1388 contains the four Gospels, dating from the 5th/6th century, kept in Berlin since 1865. The manuscript's text was published by Gwilliam in 1901 and includes around 70 Old Syriac textual variants.
- British Library Ms. 14470, containing the four Gospels, Paul's Letters, Acts, James, 1 Peter, and 1 John, dating from the 5th/6th century.
- British Library Ms. 14479, containing Paul's Letters, prepared in Edessa in 534, is the earliest dated manuscript. Written in elegant Syriac alphabet, with vowels added by a later hand.
- The Rabbula Gospels, an illuminated manuscript prepared in 586 in the Monophysite monastery of Beth-Zagba. It contains the four Gospels and is kept in Florence (Laurentian Library, Plut. I, Cod. 56).

=== Subsequent Syriac translations ===
One of the still unsolved mysteries in the history of the New Testament is the Philoxenian (syr^{ph}) and Harkleian (syr^{h}) translations. According to one version, they are the Peshitta's revisions. First, in 508 Philoxenus, Bishop of Manbij on the Euphrates River, was said to have revised the Peshitta (Philoxenian), while in 616 Thomas of Harkel (Harkelian) revised the Philoxenian translation. According to the second version, these are two separate translations. About 35 manuscripts representing the Harkel translation have survived; they date from the seventh century upward and show some similarity to the Western text-type represented by the Codex Bezae. The Philoxenian translation is known only from the markings of Thomas' "critical apparatus" in the Harkleian manuscripts. It already contained the four small Universal Epistles and the Apocalypse, which Peshitta did not have. The most important Harkleian manuscript is kept at Trinity College in Dublin. Around 500, a translation was made into Syro-Palestinian (the Aramaic-Galilean dialect spoken by Jesus). It contains 2 Peter, 2 John, 3 John, Jude and Revelation, and represents the Caesarean text-type and is completely independent of other Syriac translations. It is preserved in the Lectionaries and other fragmentary manuscripts. The three most important manuscripts date from 1030, 1104 and 1118. It is designated by the symbol syr^{pal}.

=== Limitations of Syriac translations ===
Syriac, as a Semitic language, has no endings and could not afford to take as much liberty in changing the word order as Greek did. The verb is conjugated in a completely different way than in Greek. The Syriac language had the so-called "status emphaticus," the use of which does not always correspond to the Greek genitive.

In transcriptions of proper names, the consonant ξ is rendered with two Syriac consonants ܭܣ. The letter τ was transcribed by ܛ, while θ was transcribed by ܬ (e.g., the name Τιμοθεε, Timothy, ܛܡܬܐܘܣ). In the case of Semitisms, efforts were made to reproduce the original Semitic sound, but not all Semitic names were recognized (e.g., Aretas in 2 Corinthians 11:32). The Greek NT text-type renders the name of the city jirušalaim in two ways: Ιερουσαλημ/Ιεροσολυμα, Syriac translations revert to a unified form: Urišlem. Διαβολος is regularly rendered by satana. Σιμων/Πετρος/Κηφας. Σιμων Πετρος is almost always rendered by šem‛un kepa. Πετρος, however, is sometimes rendered by Ptrws. The differences in verb conjugation are the most difficult.

== Latin translations ==
=== Old Latin translations ===
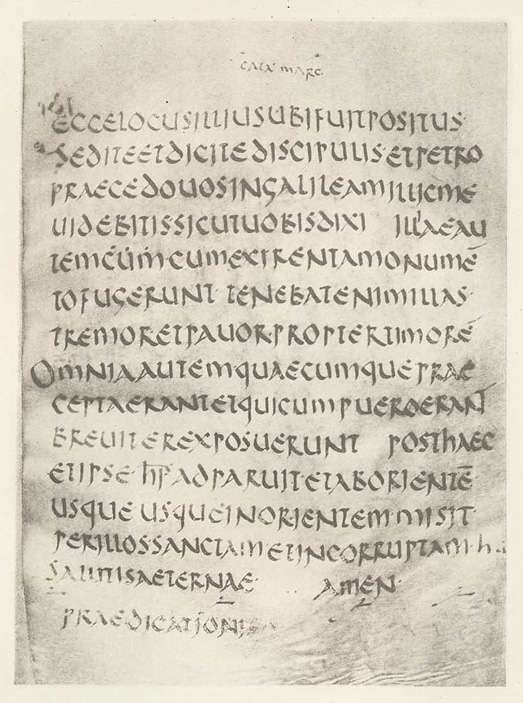
Codex Bobiensis – the last page of the "Gospel of Mark"

The Western Church originally used Greek, so the need to translate the Bible into Latin did not immediately arise. The first Latin translations appeared first in North Africa (around 170) and then in Rome (Note: In Rome, liturgy in Latin was introduced around 190.) and Gaul. Their number steadily increased and by the middle of the fourth century had reached forty. All these translations were based on the Septuagint and slavishly adhere to the Greek text. Translations produced before the Vulgate were called Old Latin translations – Vetus latina. The most important and respected were Aphra and Itala, but neither of them gained widespread recognition throughout the Church. Both translations represent the Western text-type. Aphra deviated more from the Greek text-type, while Itala had a bit of Byzantine influence, the number of which increased over time. The translations underwent constant transformations, and their textual variants multiplied. (Note: Among the surviving Old Latin manuscripts, there are 27 variants of the text of Luke 23:4-5. (B. Metzger, The Text of the New Testament: Its Transmission, Corruption, and Restoration, Oxford 1968, p. 72).)

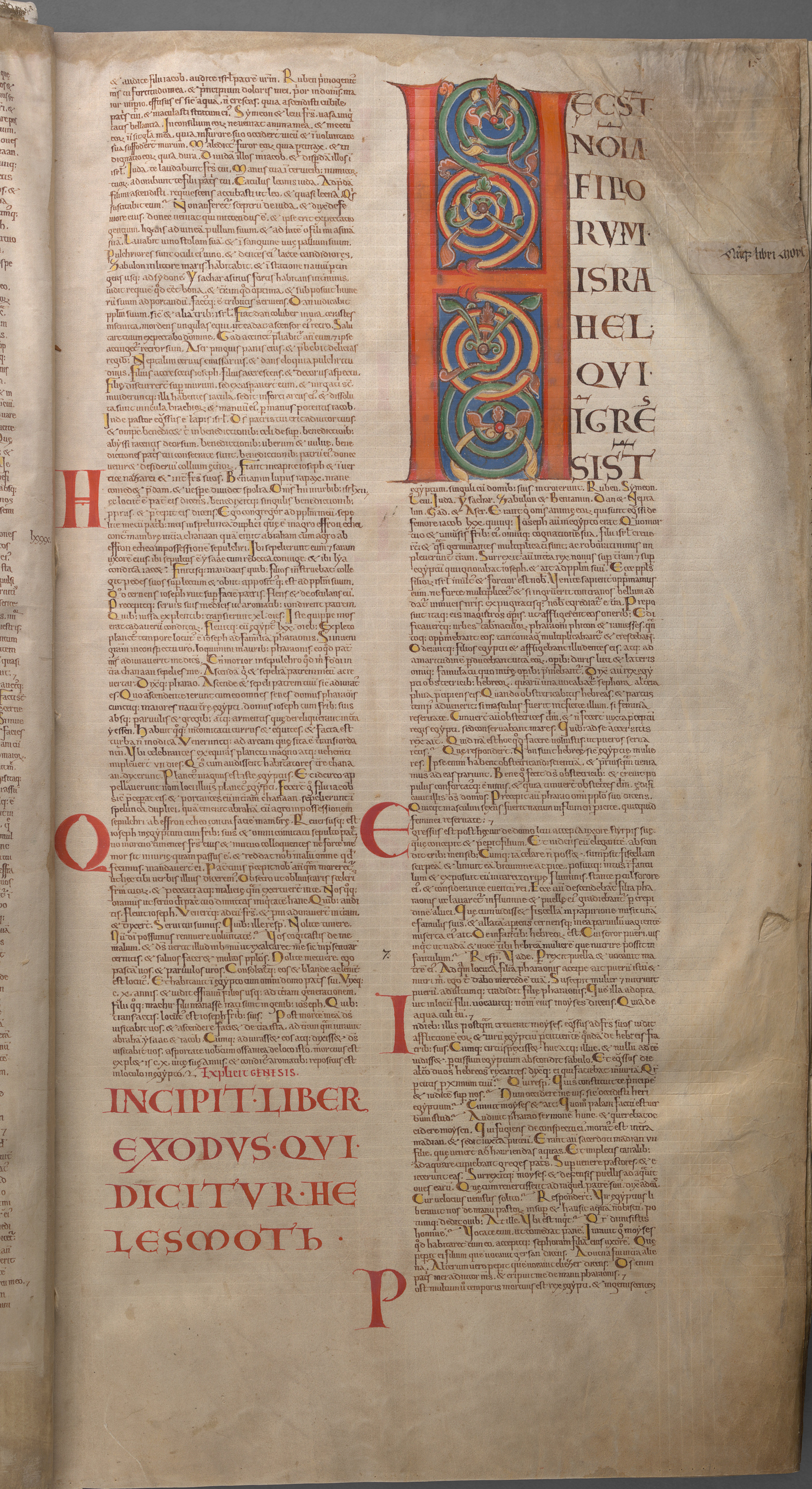
Codex Gigas

Not a single Old Latin manuscript transmitting the full text of the NT has survived to our day. However, 32 manuscripts containing the Gospels, 12 Acts, 4 Paul's epistles and 1 Revelation, plus a number of fragments have survived, making a total of 89 manuscripts. They date from the 4th to 13th centuries. Most of them represent Itala, while a small number of manuscripts of Aphra have survived. The most valuable manuscripts are:

- Codex Bobiensis 1 (k), contains Matthew 1-15 and Mark 8–16, and dates from around 400. It was transported to the Irish monastery of Bobbio, in northern Italy. It transmits the Versio Aphra and is the most important witness to the text-type, showing a high correspondence with Uncial 0171 and similarity to Cyprian's quotations. It is preserved in Turin.
- Codex Palatinus 2 (e), contains four Gospels, dated to the 4th century; written in silver ink. The text has features of a Europeanized Versio Aphra. Preserved in Trent.
- Codex Vercellensis 3 (a), Gospels, second half of the 4th century.
- Codex Veronensis 4 (b), Gospels; late 5th century; Verona. Burkitt believed that this text-type was used by Jerome as the basis for the Vulgate.
- Codex Bezae 5 (d), Gospels, Acts, 3 John. The Latin text-type is independent of the Greek text-type (left side), the Old Latin translations as well as the Vulgate. It was written around 400.
- Codex Colbertinus 6 (c), four Gospels, 11th century, mixed text-type, essentially Itala punctuated by parts of Aphra. Both of these texts have been tainted by the Vulgate.
- Codex Corbeiensis 8 (ff^{2}), Gospels; 5th century. Originally belonged to the monastery of Corbey near Amiens, now kept in Paris.
- Codex Brixianus 10 (f), Gospels; 6th century.
- Codex Claromontanus 12 (h); contains the Gospels; dated to the 5th century.
- Codex Vindobonensis 17 (i), Gospels; 5th century.
- Codex Ambrosianus 21 (s), Gospels; 5th century.
- Codex Gigas 51 (gig), completed in 1229; it contains 320 pages measuring 89 by 49 cm, is 22 cm thick and weighs 72 kg. The Codex transmits the Vulgate text-type, but Acts of the Apostles and Revelation transmit the Old Latin translation. In addition to the books of the Bible, it contains a whole series of works and treatises, among them are: Antiquitates and De bello Judaico by Josephus Flavius, Etymologies by Isidore of Seville, Chronica Boemorum by Cosmas of Prague (1045–1125). In 1648 the codex made its way to Sweden and has since been kept in Stockholm.
- Codex Bobiensis or Vindobonensis 53 (s), a palimpsest, contains the Acts and catholic epistles, 6th century, re-written in the 8th century.
- Codex Floriacensis 55 (h), contains ¼ of Acts, fragments of the catholic epistles and the Apocalypse. 5th/6th century; Versio Aphra. The manuscript text contains many errors; Paul's journey described in Acts 28:1-13 has been summarized.
- Codex Claromontanus 75 (d), Letters of Paul; 5th/VI century.
- Codex Boernerianus 77 (g), Letters of Paul; 9th century.
- Codex Augiensis 78 (f), Letters of Paul; 9th century.
- Codex Guelferbytanus 79 (gue), Letters of Paul; 6th century.

=== Vulgate ===
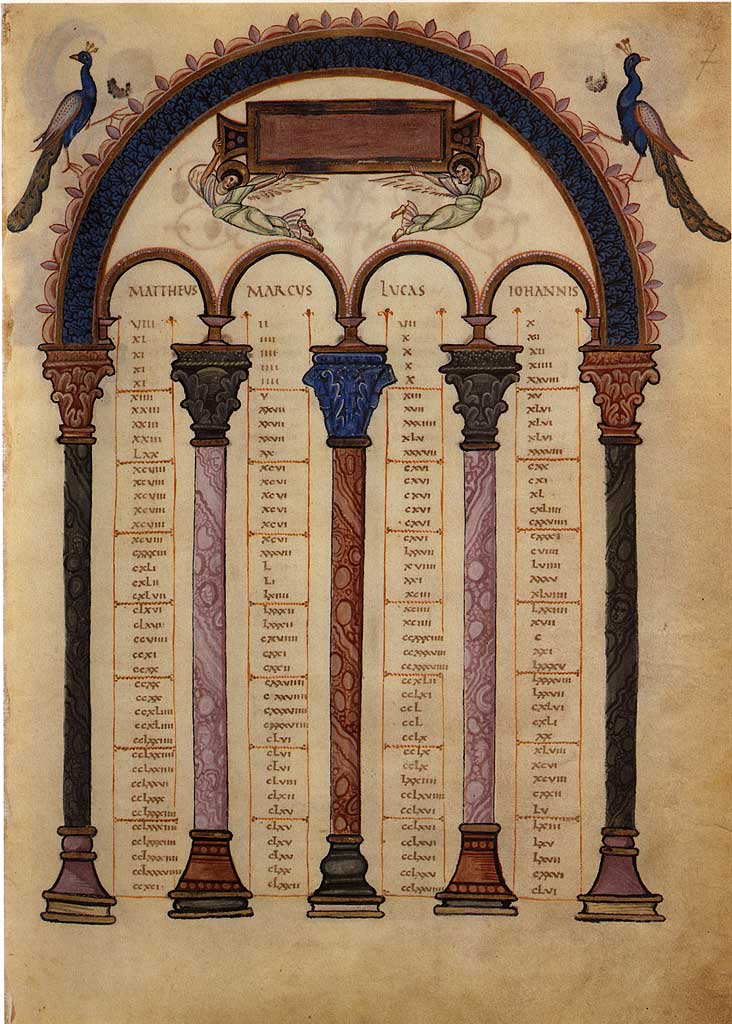
Codex Aureus of Lorsch

Itala was disordered, and the disorder increased as time passed. In this situation, Pope Damasus commissioned Jerome to make a new translation of the entire Scriptures into Latin. The work on the Gospels took about a year and was completed in 383. It was a revision of the Itala, which Jerome confronted with Greek manuscripts. He worked out the Gospels most thoroughly, and this translation was called the Vulgate (vulgus – common, ordinary); it met with criticism and was revised many times, but by the end of the 6th century it already enjoyed authority until it became the official Bible of the Western Church.

Since the Vulgate functioned alongside Old Latin translations for some time, this influenced Old Latin reminiscences in the Vulgate text-type and the correction of Old Latin text-types in the Vulgate fashion. In addition, due to the carelessness of copyists, the text-type was further distorted. In this situation, Alcuin (735–804) and Theodulf (750–821) attempted to revise and purify the Vulgate text-type, but their efforts contributed to the growth of mixed versions. Lanfrank of Bec (1005–1089) and Stephen Harding (d. 1134) later worked on revising the text of the Vulgate, also fruitlessly, so in the late Middle Ages correctoria were created, among them the Paris Bible. After the invention of printing in Europe, the Vulgate became the first printed book – the Gutenberg Bible (1452–1456) was created.

The first critical edition of the Vulgate text-type was the work of Robert Estienne in 1528. In 1546, the Council of Trent passed a resolution on the need to prepare a revised Vulgate. This was accomplished by Pope Sixtus V in 1590 (the Sixtine Vulgate), but was critically imperfect, so Sixtus' successor Clement VIII led to the publication of the revised Sixto-Clementine Vulgate, corrected in 4900 places (1592, 1593, 1598).

In 1907 Pope Pius X appointed a commission to revise the Vulgate. The premise was to correct the text-type in the spirit of the achievements of modern linguistics, to cleanse the spelling of medieval trappings and to translate anew what Jerome had departed too far from the original. The work took several decades, with the entire work published between 1926 and 1969.

The Vulgata Stuttgartiana is more similar to the Sixto-Clementine than to the editio nova, and represents an attempt to bring the text as close to Jerome's original Vulgate as possible. It is based mainly on the 8th century Codex Amiatinus.

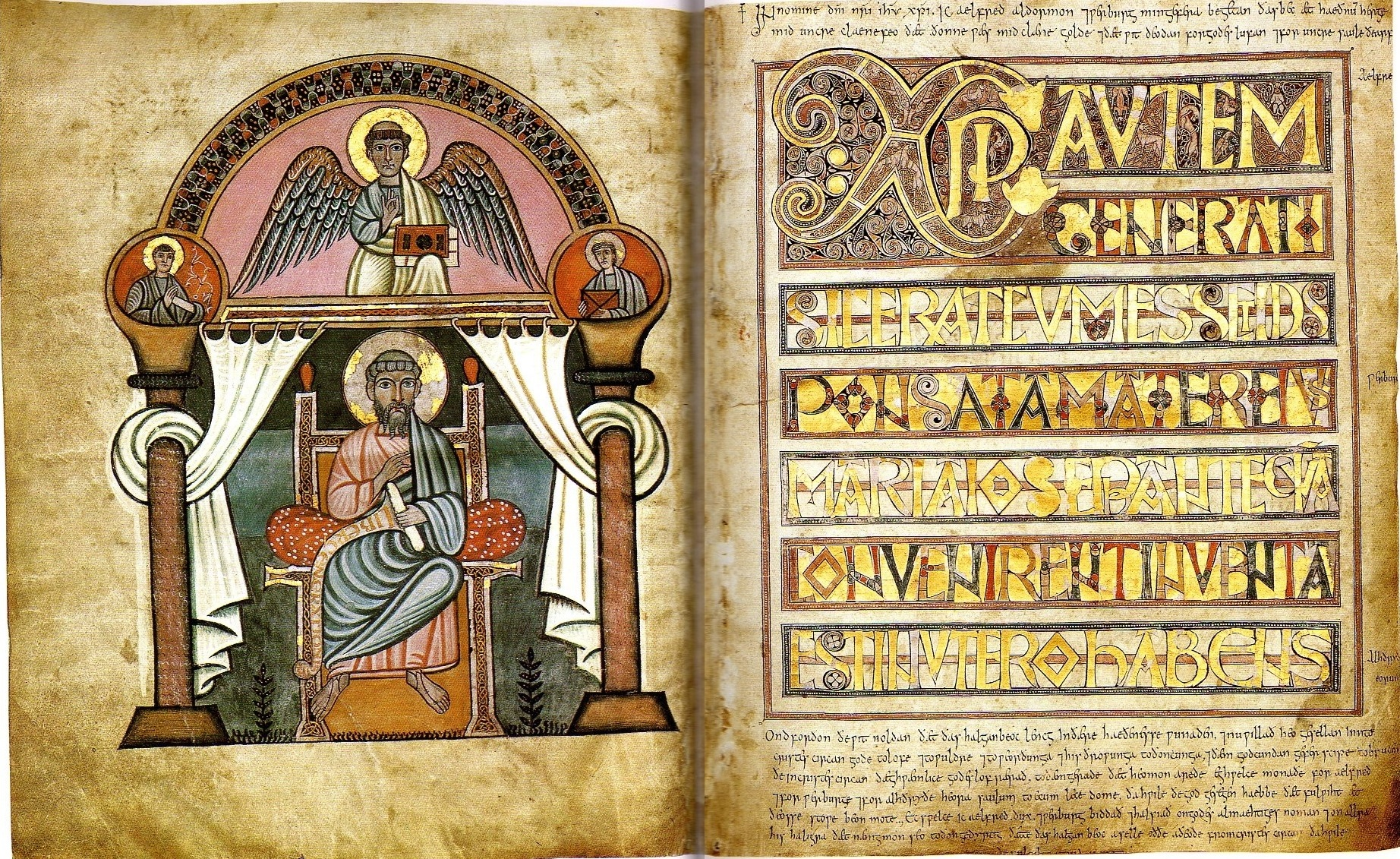
Codex Aureus, beginning of the Gospel of Matthew

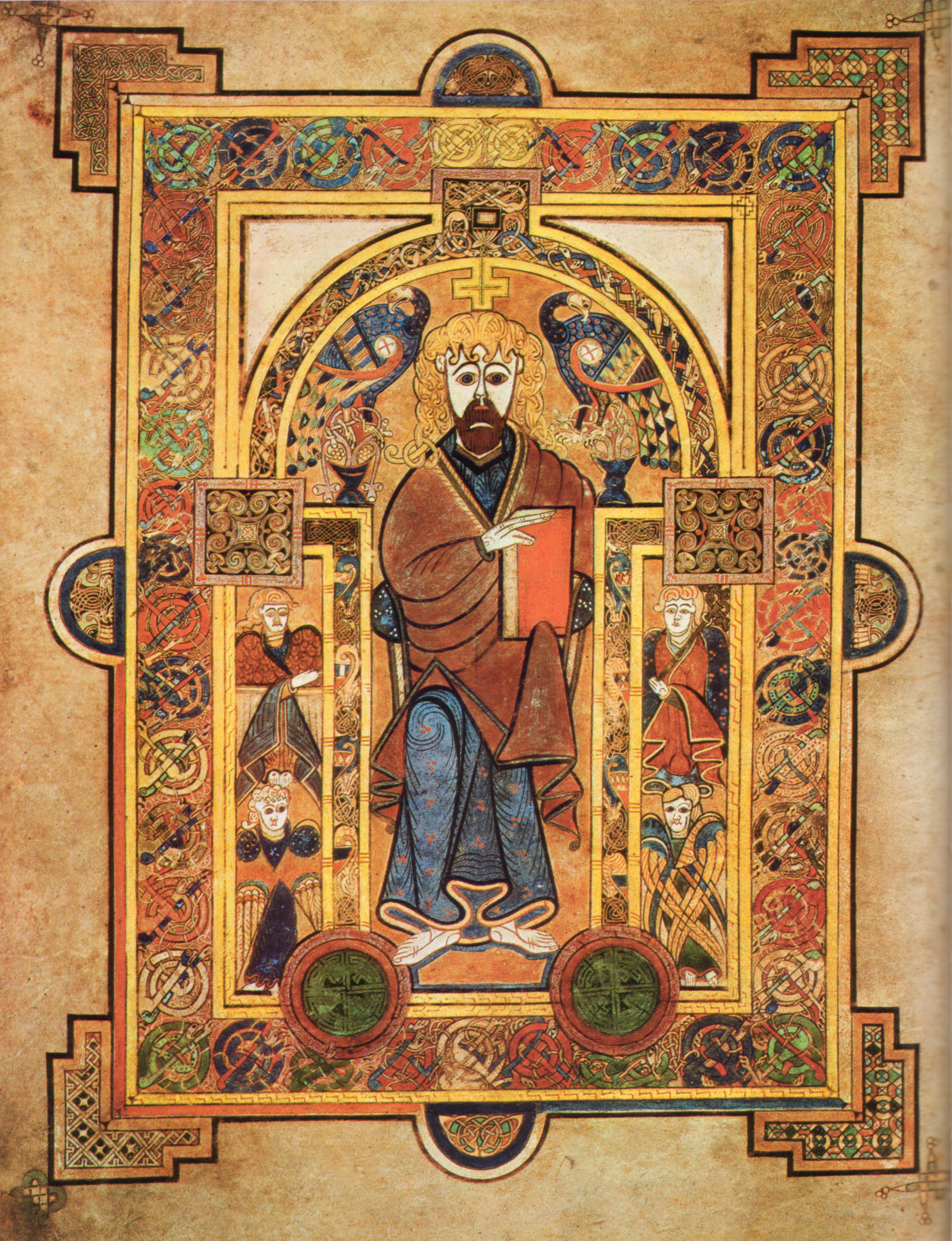
Book of Kells, illustration depicting Christ the King

More than 10,000 manuscripts of the Vulgate have survived to modern times. Their exact number is not known. Some of the more famous and valued manuscripts of the Vulgate include:

- Codex Amiatinus (A), the oldest manuscript with the complete text of the Old and New Testaments, consisting of 1029 pages measuring 50.5 by 34 cm and 15 cm thick. It is written in columns, in large, clear, regular, and beautiful uncial script. It was produced before the year 716 based on the Codex Grandior from the 6th century, in northern England. Since 1786, it has been preserved in the Laurentian Library. It is regarded as the best witness of St. Jerome's text-type. Tischendorf published the text in 1854.
- Codex Dublinensis (D), also known as the Book of Armagh, contains the complete text of the New Testament. It was produced in the year 807, with the Epistle to the Laodiceans following the Epistle to the Colossians, and the Acts placed after the Apocalypse. It presents an Irish type of Vulgate text, characterized by a certain number of additions. In some places, it can be observed that the manuscript's text-type follows that of a Greek manuscript representing the Ferrar Group (f^{13}). It is housed in Trinity College, Dublin.
- Codex Fuldensis (F), written between 541 and 546 in Capua, on the orders of Bishop Victor. It was personally checked and corrected by him. It contains the Gospels in the form of Tatian's Diatessaron, as well as the Epistle to the Laodiceans and Jerome's Prologue to the canonical Gospels. The text of the codex is close to that of the Amiatinus. It is preserved in the library in Fulda (Abb. 61).
- Codex Sangermanensis (G), New Testament, from the beginning of the 9th century is one of the most important representatives of the French Vulgate. It was used by Stephanus in his Biblia sacra (1538–1540, 1546). It is kept in Paris (BnF, fond lat. 11553).
- Codex Complutensis I, completed in the year 927. It contains the entire Bible, with the Epistle to the Laodiceans following Hebrews. It was used by Cardinal Jiménez in his Complutensian Polyglot Bible. During the Spanish Civil War (1936–1939), it was almost completely destroyed. The preserved remnants are kept in Madrid (Bibl. Univ. Cent. 31).
- Codex Mediolanensis (M), contains the four Gospels, dating back to the second half of the 6th century. The text is very good, compared to Amiatinus and Fuldensis. It is preserved in the Ambrosian Library.
- The Book of Kells (Q), contains the Gospels, dating from the 8th/9th century. The text presents an Irish text-type, with particular errors resulting from the scribe's misunderstanding of the text. It is renowned for its beautiful decorations.
- Codex N, the Gospels, from the 5th century; a palimpsest. It was created in Italy and is kept in Paris (BnF, lat. 1628) and Autun (Bibl. mun. 21). One of the oldest manuscripts of the Vulgate.
- Codex Reginensis (R), Paul's Letters, from the 8th century, produced near Ravenna, kept in the Vatican Library.
- Codex Lindisfarnensis (Y), contains the Gospels, produced shortly after 687; richly illustrated, considered one of the most beautiful books in the world. The text shows close affinity to the Amiatinus. Later, between the lines of the Latin text-type, someone added text in Old English, which is a paraphrase of the Latin text-type. It is kept in the British Library.
- Codex Harleianus (Z), contains the Gospels, dated to the 6th/7th century. Initially housed in the Royal Library in Paris, but it was stolen by Jean Aymon in 1707 and sold to R. Harley, who donated it to the British Library.
- Codex Theodulphianus (Θ) – Old and New Testaments, Psalms and Gospels written in silver on purple, around the year 900, a revision by Theodulf; kept in Paris.
- Codex Sangallensis 1395 (Σ), the oldest known manuscript containing the Gospels of the Vulgate, although with numerous gaps; from the early 5th century; preserved in St. Gallen. There are few copies that separate it from Jerome's text.

=== Limitations of Latin translations ===
A limitation of the Latin translations are the transcriptions of Semitic names and terms: Caiphas/Caiaphas, Scarioth/Iscariotes, Istrahel/Israhel, Isac/Isaac. Another type of limitation is caused by Latinisms (e.g., ἑκατονταρχης/κεντυριων → centurio). Due to the limitations of Latin grammar, the aorist and perfectum tenses cannot be distinguished. Both ελαλησα and λελαληκα must be rendered by locutus sum. Sometimes the genitive is rendered by the demonstrative pronoun in the expressions hic mundus or hoc saeculum. Greek has many forms of the negation participle (οὐ, οὐκ, οὐχ, οὐχί, μή, οὐ μή, μὴ οὐ), however, Latin has far fewer of these and as a result they are translated either by non or nonne. (Note: οὐ, οὐκ, οὐχ are forms of the same negative article, οὐ occurs only before consonants, οὐκ before unaspirated vowels, and οὐχ before aspirated vowels.) The participle οὐδε/μηδε is translated as neque and the adjective οὐδεiς/μηδεις translated as nemo. Greek synonyms such as καταγγέλλω and ἁναγγγέλλω, οἰκέω and κατοικέω are not precisely distinguished in Latin. Sometimes there is a problem with the prepositions ἐκ and ἁπό, ἁπό and ὐπό, ἐν and ἐπί, rendered by the Latin a, de and ex. Also, the prepositions εἰς and ἐν in Hellenistic Greek may have been used interchangeably. This problem applies to all synonyms.

In general, Latin translations were very literal and tried to render the same Greek word with the same Latin word. But this was not always the case, especially with Versio Aphra, which rendered the same Greek words with different Latin terms. The term αὐτου is rendered by eius or illius, ην by erat or fuit. (Note: Proof that based on the Latin translation, the Greek text-type cannot be reproduced without error is provided by Erasmus' translation (in Rev. 17:4 – ακαθαρτητος, in Rev. 22:18 – συμμαρτυρουμαι γαρ).)

== Coptic translations ==
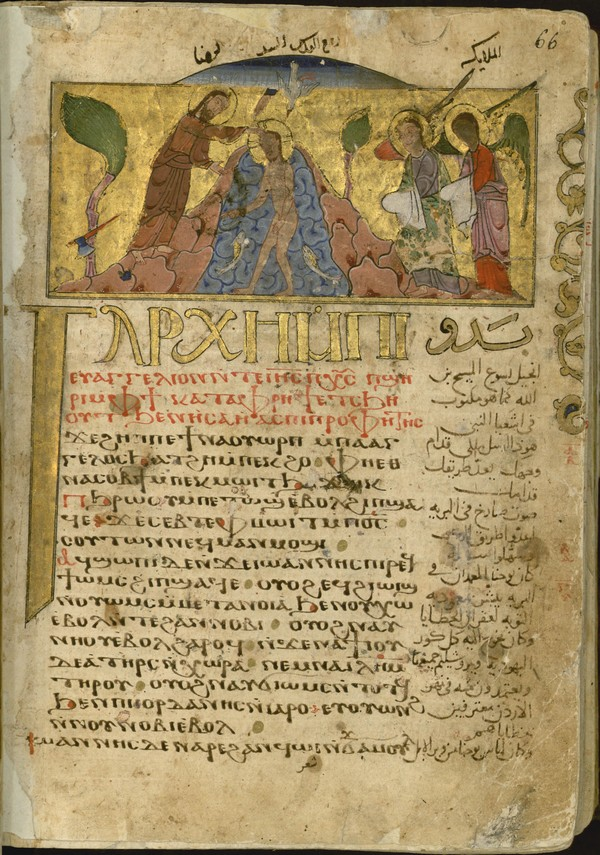
Gospel of Mark from 1249/1250 in Coptic and Arabic

Initially, the Church in Egypt used the Greek language. The transition to Coptic – the last form of the Egyptian language – took place between 180 and 200. However, the Coptic language functioned in as many as seven dialects. The New Testament was translated into five of them. The Coptic translations represent the Alexandrian text-type, while the Sahidic (cop^{sa}) and Bohairic (cop^{bo}) translations have traces of the Western text-type. The Sahidic translation was quite free, while the Bohairic translation was very slavish, tending to translate every word, even using grammatical borrowings. 52 manuscripts are bilingual and they contain – in addition to the Coptic text-type – the Greek text-type; 2 manuscripts are trilingual and they contain the following text-types: Greek, Coptic, Arabic.

=== Sahidic dialect ===
At first, a partial translation was made into the Sahidic (cop^{sa}) dialect spoken in upper Egypt (knowledge of Greek was not common here). Later it was supplemented with missing books. The exact date of the translation is unknown, with scholars giving dates from the mid-2nd century to the early 4th century. This translation generally represents the Alexandrian textual tradition. However, it contains quite a lot of Western impositions in the texts of the Gospel of John and Acts. These are accidental impositions and it is difficult to find any regularity in them. The text-type of the Sahidic dialect is located between the text of the Greek codices A and B, the closest for the $\mathfrak{P}^{75}$, it is also close for Codex T, which is a bilingual Greek-Sahidic codex. Based on later manuscripts, a slow process of text revision can be observed. In the 9th century, the Sahidic dialect began to give way to Bohairic. Manuscripts representing this translation were discovered in the 18th century. There are 560 known Sahidic manuscripts cataloged by the Münster institute, none of them complete.

In Acts, essentially the Alexandrian text-type passes on, with a small number of lessons from the Western text-type. In the "apostolic decree" of Acts 15:19 n there was a superimposition of Alexandrian and Western lessons. In Paul's Epistles, the text is Alexandrian with a Western tinge, close to the $\mathfrak{P}^{46}$ and the Vatican Codex. In the catholic epistles, the Sahidic translation represents the classical Alexandrian text-type and is distant for all other text-types, very often resonating with the Codex B. The Sahidic manuscripts omit the same verses as the Greek manuscripts representing the Alexandrian tradition. The order of the Gospels is John, Matthew, Mark, and Luke. The Letter to the Hebrews is placed after 2 Corinthians and before Galatians. In many manuscripts, the Book of Revelation is missing.

==== More important manuscripts ====
- The Crosby-Schøyen Codex, consists of 52 papyrus sheets. It contains the complete text of 1 Peter, as well as Jonah, 2 Maccabees, the Peri Pascha of Melito, and an anonymous Homily. It is dated to the 3rd/4th century and is housed at Duke University.
- MS. Or. 7594, contains Deuteronomy, Jonah, and Acts (in that order), dated to the late 3rd or early 4th century, kept in the British Library.
- Michigan MS. Inv. 3992, contains 1 Corinthians, Titus, and Psalms, dating back to the 4th century. Berlin MS. Or. 408 and British Museum Or. 3518 originally formed one manuscript, containing Revelation, 1 John, and Philemon (in that order), dated to the 4th century.
- The Chester Beatty Collection, presents three Sahidic NT manuscripts, dated to the 6th or 7th century. One contains Acts and the Gospel of John, the second contains Paul's Letters and the Gospels, and the third contains Psalms from I to L and the first chapter of Matthew. Some manuscripts include Mark 16 (Mk 16:9-10), while others do not. John 7:53–8:1 is omitted in all manuscripts.
- Berlin P. 15926, housed in Berlin, presents a strictly Western text-type of the New Testament.

George Horner prepared a critical edition of the Sahidic text between 1911 and 1924.

=== Bohairic dialect ===
The translation into the Bohairic dialect (cop^{bo}), used in the Nile Delta, was made in the 3rd century, or at the latest in the early 4th century. The history of the Bohairic translation is the most complicated among all Coptic dialects. It was previously assumed that the Bohairic translation was based on a Greek manuscript representing the late Alexandrian text-type. However, two fragments discovered in the 20th century, dating from the 4th to 5th centuries, changed scholars' views on the history of the Bohairic text-type. The text-type transmitted by them is so different from later known manuscripts that it has been designated as proto-Bohairic text (cop^{bo}). It even differs in language. The order of the books is: the Gospels (John, Matthew, Mark, and Luke), Paul's Letters (Hebrews placed after 2 Thessalonians and before 1 Timothy), Catholic Epistles, Acts, Revelation. Only a few manuscripts contain the Book of Revelation.

In this translation, the Sahidic translation was used, as evidenced in some parts of the text-type. Influences from the Western text-type are also visible, while the Byzantine text-type is difficult to discern. By the 11th century, when the patriarchate was moved from Alexandria to Cairo, the Bohairic dialect had already become the dominant language in the Coptic Church. Consequently, the translation of the New Testament into the Bohairic dialect (cop^{bo}) became the official text of the Coptic Church in Egypt. It is uncertain whether the Bohairic text-type was ever revised.

More than a hundred manuscripts of the Bohairic dialect have been preserved, but they are of late origin. The oldest complete set of the Gospels dates back to 1174, followed by one from 1178 to 1180, and another from 1192. The remaining manuscripts date from the 13th century onwards. Bodmer discovered a papyrus – Papyrus Bodmer III – containing the majority of the Gospel of John, dated to the 4th century (possibly also the 5th century). There is also a fragment of the Epistle to the Philippians, which presents the text in Sahidic form. All manuscripts contain Mark 16:9–20, while the texts of John 5:4 and John 7:53–8:11 have been omitted in all major manuscripts. George Horner prepared a critical edition of the Bohairic text between 1898 and 1905.

=== Other Coptic dialects ===
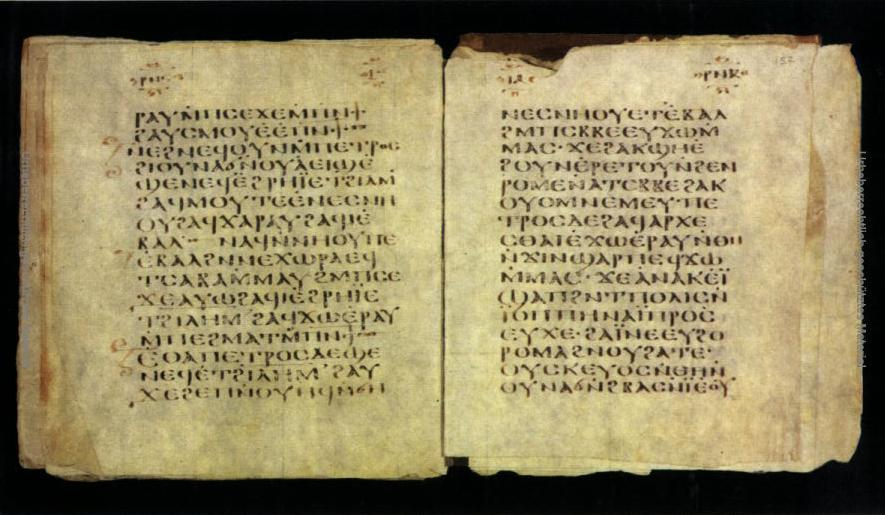
Codex Glazier, Acts in Middle Egyptian dialect

Later, the New Testament was translated into the dialects of Middle Egypt: Fayumic (cop^{fay}), Achmimic (cop^{ach}), and Subachmimic (cop^{ach2}). These translations were based partly on the Greek text-type and partly on earlier Coptic translations, primarily in the Sahidic dialect. The exact time of their creation is difficult to determine, but it is known that they existed in the 4th century. These translations, for the most part, represent the Alexandrian text-type, and their dependence on the Western text-type is noticeable, with occasional parallels to the Old Latin translations. The manuscripts that have survived to our times do not transmit the complete New Testament in the Middle Egyptian dialects. One of them, in the Fayumic dialect, contains only John 6:11–15:11 (with gaps). A manuscript with the text-type of the Gospel of John in the Subachmimic dialect is dated to the years 350–375. It is closer to the Sahidic translation than the Bohairic. The Schøyen Codex contains the Gospel of Matthew and is dated to the 4th century.

=== Limitations of the Coptic dialects ===
The Coptic alphabet was based on the Greek alphabet, of which 24 letters were used, along with 7 letters borrowed from the Demotic script (Ϣ, Ϥ, Ϧ, Ϩ, Ϫ, Ϭ, Ϯ). Five letters were used only in words of Greek origin. However, the Coptic language does not distinguish between d and t. This is evident in transcriptions of terms such as: σκανδαλον or ενδυμα. On the other hand, it distinguishes sounds that were not known to the Greeks. The Coptic language has only two genders, lacking an equivalent for the μεν particle, although it was sometimes transcribed (along with the δε particle). Many terms have been borrowed from the Greek language (e.g., αλλα, χαρις, σκανδαλον, δικαιοσυνη, κοινονεια, σωμα, ψυχη, αγαθος, πονηρος, προφητης, μαθητης, μαρτυρια, σταυρος, γραμμαρ, σοφος, χρονος, εξουσια, θαλασσα, Σατανας, and many others). Due to itacism, many words are written in two ways: αρχιερευς/αρχηερευς, μαθητης/μαθιτης, Ιταλια/Ηταλια, Δαειδ/Δαυιδ. Abbreviations for nomina sacra are made according to the same principle as in Greek texts (e.g., ΘΣ, ΙΗΣ, ΙΣΗΛ, ΠΝΑ). The Coptic translation, due to its literalness, is more useful than Syriac and Latin translations in reconstructing the Greek text.

== Gothic translation ==
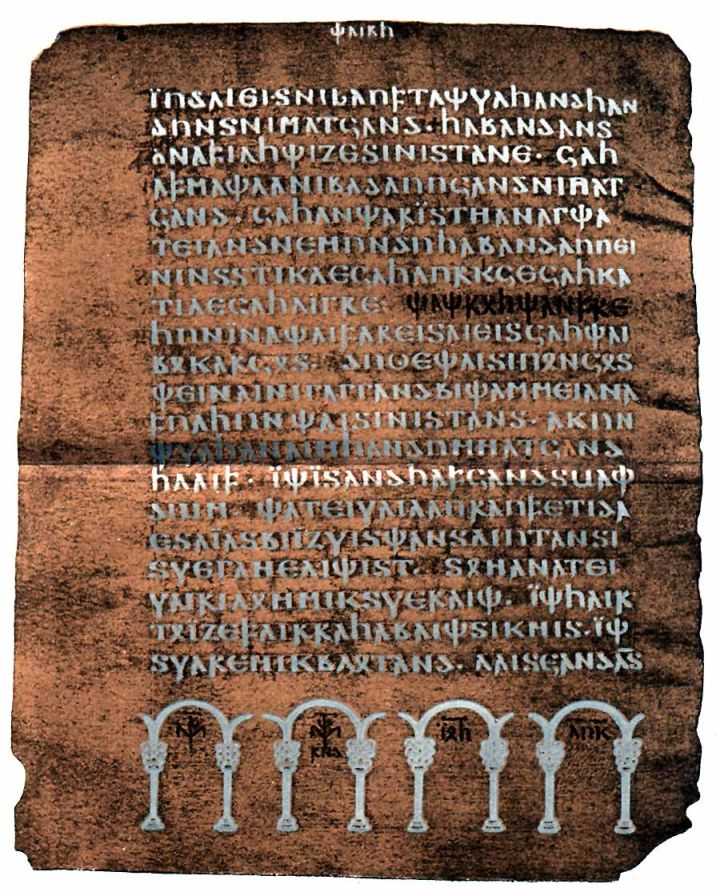
Codex Argenteus, Gospel of Mark

The Gothic translation stands out among ancient translations because its date, translator, and circumstances of its creation are known. Ulfilas, Urphilas, or Wulfila (310–383), the "Apostle of the Goths," worked in the regions of Dacia and the Bosphorus, converting the Ostrogoths to the Arian Christian faith. As the bishop of Taurida, he participated in the proceedings of the First Council of Nicaea (325). Before embarking on the translation work, he first created the Gothic alphabet, based on Greek, as he did not want to use Old Germanic runes. Another problem was the lack of terminology, so he expanded the vocabulary through borrowings from Greek and Latin. The sentence structure was based on Greek syntax. Ulfilas' translation was used in the Ostrogothic Kingdom in Italy, which lasted briefly (488–554). Shortly after their conversion to Catholicism, the Gothic language disappeared, and there was no one left interested in reading Ulfilas' translation.

The text of the New Testament represents the Byzantine textual tradition (Family E) and is close to the quotations of Chrysostom. The text of Paul's Letters is close to the Peshitta. The surviving manuscripts contain a considerable amount of Western textual elements, perhaps added later during the Ostrogothic Kingdom period.

The most important manuscript is the Codex Argenteus, also known as the "Silver Bible," written in silver and gold letters on parchment soaked in purple dye. It contains the four Gospels, in the order: Matthew, John, Luke, Mark. It consists of 188 pages today (originally there were 336). It was prepared for Theodoric the Great (455–526), the king of the Ostrogoths, shortly after his coronation in Ravenna or Brescia. After Theodoric's death, the codex was forgotten. It was not listed in any catalogs or book lists. It was discovered in the 16th century. During the Thirty Years' War, it was taken by the Swedes and has since been kept in Uppsala. In 1970, in Speyer, one of the missing pages of the codex, known as the Speyer Fragment, was discovered, which concludes the Gospel of Mark. Since then, the codex consists of 188 pages.

The remaining manuscripts of the Gothic New Testament, with one exception, are palimpsests and are fragmentary. The Codex Carolinus contains Romans 11–15, with a bilingual Latin-Gothic text; it is a palimpsest and is kept in Wolfenbüttel. The Codex Ambrosianus A and Codex Ambrosianus B contain fragments of all of Paul's Letters, but only 2 Corinthians has survived in its entirety. Codex Ambrosianus C contains fragments of Matthew 25–27. All three date from the 5th/6th century and are kept in Milan. Codex Taurinensis contains 4 pages with fragments of Galatians and Colossians. There are no manuscripts preserving Acts, the General Epistles, and the Apocalypse. These books have been completely lost.

In 1908, Wilhelm Streitberg prepared an edition of the Gothic Bible based on the manuscripts available to him. In 1919, the second revised edition was published. In 1965, E.A. Ebbinghaus released the fifth revised edition of the Gothic Bible.

== Armenian translation ==
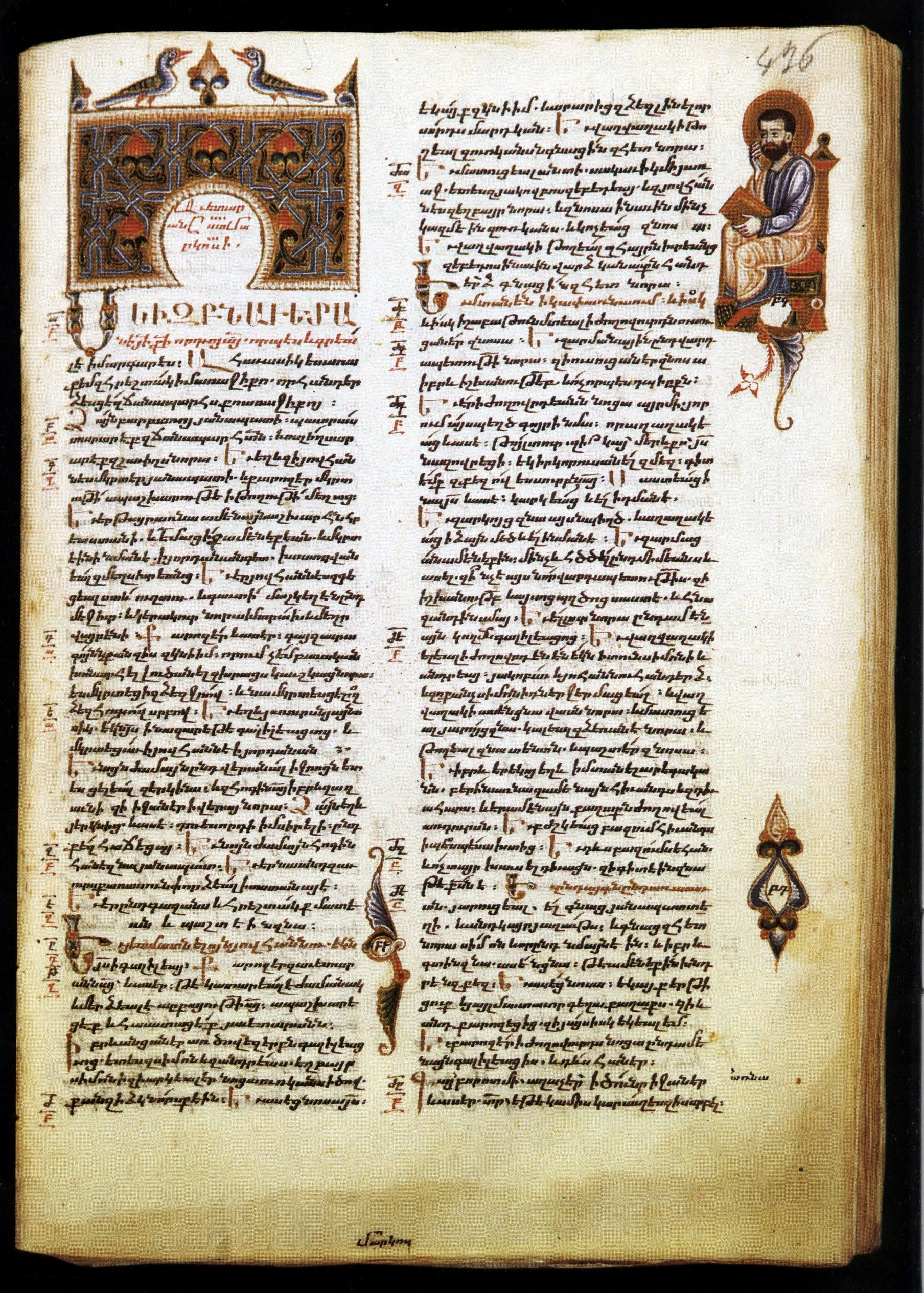
The Gospel of Mark in Armenian, Codex 2627, folio 436 recto (Matenadaran)

Between 410 and 414, Mesrop and Isaac translated the entire Bible into Armenian. The New Testament contained 22 books (influenced by the Peshitta). The translation was likely made from Greek, but the influence of the Syriac translation is noticeable. The translator consulted the Syriac translation. According to another explanation, the initial translation was made from Syriac and was later revised based on Greek manuscripts. The original Armenian translation has not survived.

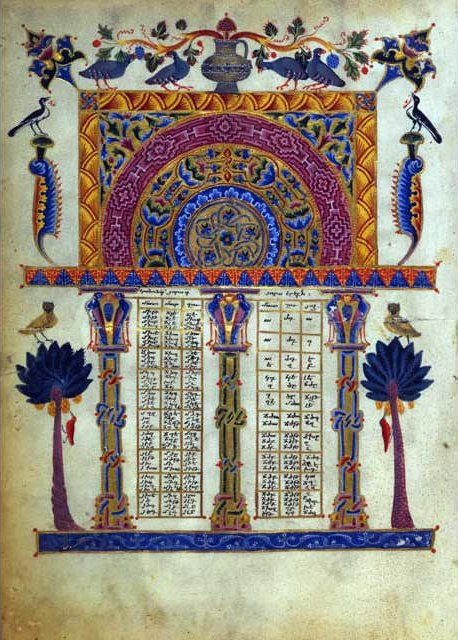
Armenian Gospel Book from 1256

Erroll F. Rhodes enumerated 1244 Armenian manuscripts in 1959. However, Rhodes did not take into account lectionaries and commentaries. The total number of manuscripts exceeds 1600, with 100 containing the entire Bible. This number is greater than any other ancient translation except for the Vulgate. A significant portion of these manuscripts is preserved in the Bodleian Library. The oldest manuscripts date from the 9th to 10th centuries. The oldest dated manuscript, MS. 991, dates back to 887 and contains the four Gospels written in majuscule. MS. 2374, from the year 989, contains an explanation that Mark 16:9–20 was written by the presbyter Aristion. The significance of this note is minimal because it does not come from the original scribe; it was added in the 14th century. The earliest manuscripts of Acts, the General Epistles, Paul's Letters, and the Apocalypse are bilingual Greek-Armenian codices (Arm. 27, Arm. 9, Gregory–Åland 301; Rhodes 151) and are preserved in the French National Library in Paris.

The Armenian translation includes Third Epistle to the Corinthians and Corinthians to Paul among the books of the New Testament. A characteristic of Armenian manuscripts is commenting on the longer ending of the Gospel of Mark. Out of 220 manuscripts examined by Colwell, only 88 contain the ending without commentary, 99 manuscripts end at Mark 16:8, and the remaining manuscripts include the ending along with a scholion questioning its authenticity.

The translation likely originally represented the Caesarean text-type. Still, by the 5th century, the translation had been revised based on the Byzantine standard, retaining only some remnants of the Caesarean text-type.

The Armenian translation was printed in 1666 in Amsterdam. In 1789, Zohrab published the first critical edition of the New Testament.

Proper names are usually transcribed, and only in a few cases are they rendered using traditional Armenian terms. Greek letters θ and τ are usually rendered differently (t' or t), double consonants ξ and ψ are rendered as k's and p's (never as ks and ps), and diacritics are usually ignored. Armenian nouns decline through seven cases but do not have a vocative case and are not gendered. Verbs have fewer participial forms and lack the subjunctive mood. Greek synonyms are usually not distinguished.

== Georgian translation ==
Georgian manuscript of the Gospel of Matthew from the Alaverdi Gospels, 1054

At the end of the 5th century, a translation into Georgian was made, likely from Armenian, before the creation of the Armenian Vulgate. Conybeare claimed that the translation was made directly from Greek; however, later, due to an indeterminate number of Syriacisms, he concluded that it was translated from Syriac. Nevertheless, Conybeare based his opinion only on two manuscripts (from 913 and 995). The text of the translation represents a mixed textual tradition, with the older manuscripts showing a Caesarean element predominance, while in later manuscripts, the Byzantine tradition is prevalent.

Among the oldest manuscripts containing the Gospels are: Adysh from 897, Opiza from 913, and Tbet from 995. In the critical apparatus of many editions, the manuscript Adysh is designated by the symbol geo^{1}, while the other two manuscripts are designated by the symbol geo^{2}. Adysh represents the Caesarean text-type close to Codices Θ, 565, and 700, while geo^{2} exhibits textual affinity with f^{1} and f^{13}. The oldest manuscripts do not contain the text of John 7:53–8:11. The oldest manuscripts containing Acts and the Letters date from the second half of the 10th century. Gregory counted 17 Georgian manuscripts of the New Testament in 1902.

According to the research of J. Molitor, who examined the Letter of James, the Georgian translation presents 53 variants that he identified as Syrian (i.e., Byzantine), 51 Armenian variants, and 59 Syrian-Armenian variants. There are 163 non-Greek variants, and 66 are unusual for Oriental translations. Based on these findings, Molitor concluded that the Letter of James was translated from a Syrian-Armenian translation.

The Georgian translation was revised in the 10th century by Euthymius. Euthymius used Greek manuscripts representing the Byzantine standard text-type. The Apocalypse, translated by Euthymius, was added. The Pericope de Adultera (John 7:51–8:11) was added to the Gospel of John.

The text of the Gospels was printed in 1709 in Tbilisi. The complete Bible was published in 1743 in Moscow.

== Ethiopian translation ==
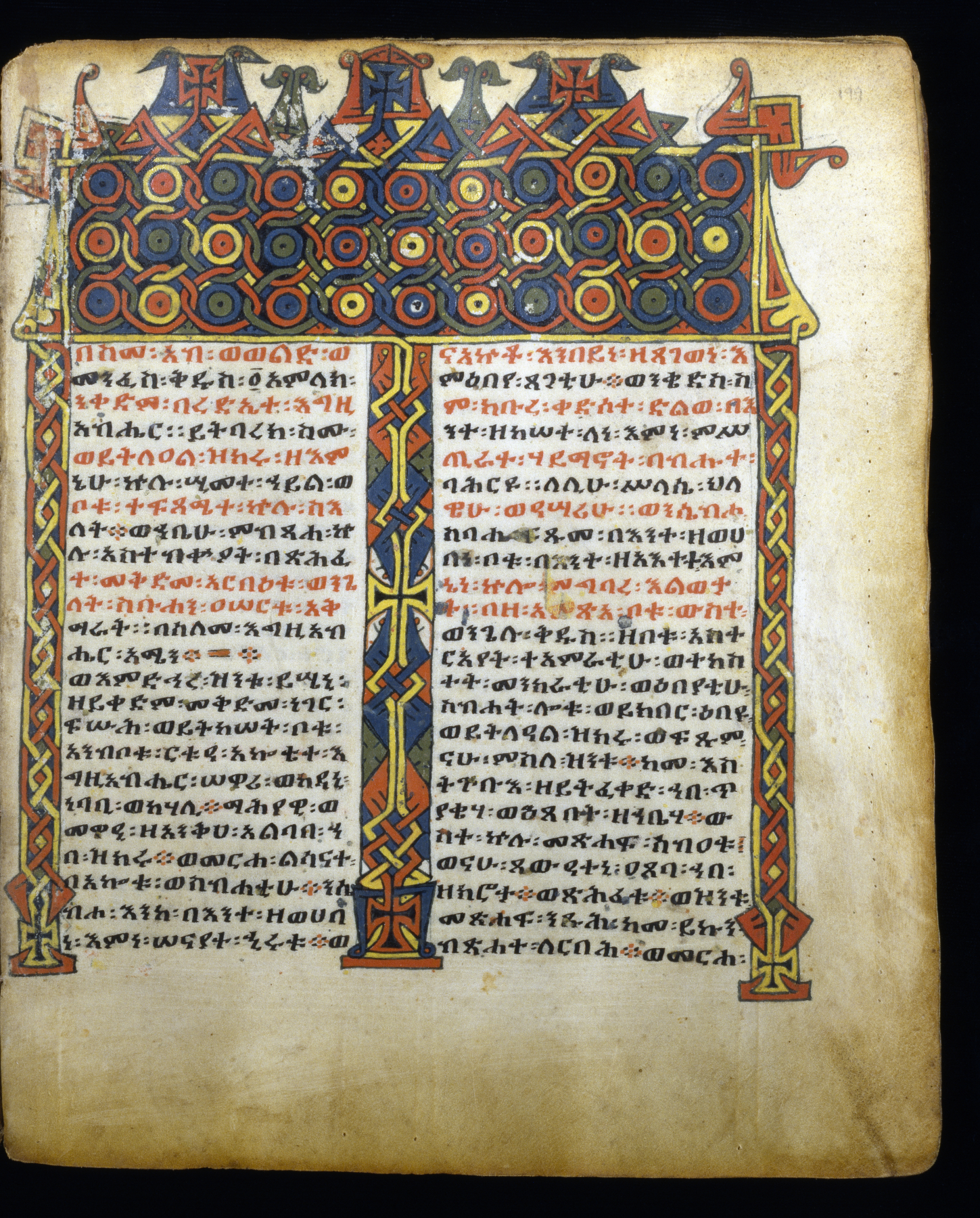
Gunda Gunde Gospels (Walters MS 850)

After the Council of Chalcedon in 451, the Monophysites were persecuted in Byzantium. A significant portion of them found refuge in Ethiopia. Among them were nine active Syrian monks who, due to their zeal and piety, attained saintly status. Besides founding monasteries and propagating Monophysite theology, they were also said to have translated the holy scriptures into the Ethiopian language. However, it is also possible that the translation was not completed until the 6th or 7th century. To this day, it has not been conclusively determined whether the Gospels were translated from Greek or Syriac. There is no doubt, however, that the other books were translated from Greek. Paul's Letters exhibit surprising statistical agreement with $\mathfrak{P}^{46}$ and the Codex Vaticanus, especially in those passages where these two manuscripts are not supported by any Greek manuscript. In other parts of the New Testament, the Ethiopian translation represents an early Byzantine text-type. In the 12th to 14th centuries, the Ethiopian translation was harmonized with the Arabic text-type.

Over three hundred manuscripts containing one or more books of the New Testament have been preserved. Twenty-six of them were created before the end of the 15th century, while the rest are from the 16th to 19th centuries. The oldest manuscript is Abba Garima I, which contains the Gospels of Mark and Matthew. Radiocarbon dating has shown that it dates from 330 to 540 (previously thought to be from the 9th or 10th century).Abba Garima II contains the Gospels of Luke and John and dates from 430 to 650 (previously thought to be from the 11th century). Other manuscripts are even older; for example, Abba Garima III, containing the Gospels, dates from the 11th century. Lalibela contains the four Gospels and dates from 1181 to 1221 AD. Abba Garima B. 20 from the 14th century contains Paul's Letters written in five languages (in columns from left to right): Ethiopian, Syriac, Coptic (Bohairic), Arabic, and Armenian, as well as the Catholic Epistles and Acts in four languages (without the Armenian column). The Ethiopian translation was printed in 1548 in Rome.

== Persian translation ==
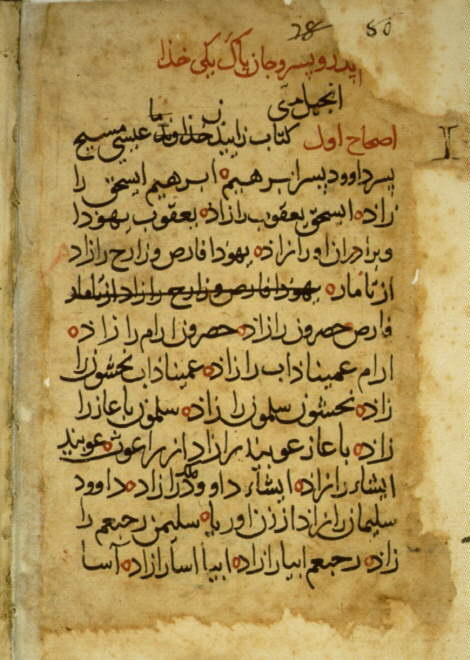
Gospel of Matthew in Persian from 1312

The origin, authorship, and initial parts of the New Testament translated into Persian remain uncertain. According to the testimony of John Chrysostom in the 4th century, there existed a translation into the Persian language. In the 5th century, Theodoret wrote that the Persians "venerate the writings of Peter, Paul, John, Matthew, Luke, and Mark as those that descended from heaven". The translation was probably made from the Peshitta. However, no fragment of the New Testament text-type from that translation has survived to our times. Several fragmentary pages with the text of the Book of Psalms in archaic Pahlavi have survived. Two translations of the Gospels into New Persian, although not strictly classified as early translations, are sometimes cited in critical apparatus. The first of these translations was made from the Peshitta, and its manuscript dates from 1341, while the second was made from Greek, with its manuscript probably dating from the 14th century. In the early 20th century, C.R. Gregory described 37 manuscripts of the Gospels from the 14th to 19th centuries. Kirsopp and Silva Lake suggested that the Persian translation contains traces of the Caesarean textual tradition. The Diatessaron in the Persian language has been preserved, translated from the Syriac language. The oldest manuscript dates from the 13th century.

== Arabic translation ==
The translator of the Arabic version remains unknown, with various traditions attributing it to different individuals. What is certain is that by the 7th century, the translation already existed. There were several translations, some from Greek, others from the Old Syriac translation, and still others from Coptic.

More than 75 manuscripts of the Arabic translation have survived. The oldest manuscript, Sinai Arabicus 151, dates back to 867 and contains Acts and the General Epistles. MS. Borg. Arab. 95, from the 9th century, contains the text of the four Gospels on 173 pages. Sinai Arabicus 72 contains the four Gospels and dates to 897. Several late copies of the Diatessaron in Arabic have also been preserved. 16 manuscripts present a bilingual Greek-Arabic text-type (including 0136, 0137, 211, 609). There are also trilingual manuscripts – two of them contain the text in Greek, Coptic, and Arabic, and one in Greek, Latin, and Arabic (minuscule 460).

The text of the four Gospels was printed in Rome in 1590–1591. The complete text of the New Testament was published in the Paris Polyglot and London Polyglot.

All printed editions of the text of the four Gospels represent the Alexandrian textual tradition. Robert Boyd thoroughly examined 63 textual variants from 1 Corinthians in the manuscript Sinai Arab. 155 and concluded that they represent the Alexandrian textual tradition with few Byzantine interpolations. Considering the quality of the text-type, Boyd concluded that the translation was made before the 7th century. Metzger noted that the matter is not settled because the translator could have used an old Greek manuscript, and the translation could have been made in the 7th century. In the Arabic translation, the Greek letter χ is often rendered as ﺵ, corresponding to "sh" (e.g., Tyshikus instead of Tychikus). Veria in Macedonia is called Aleppo (with the clarification "West").

== Sogdian translation ==
At the beginning of the Middle Ages in Central Asia, the most influential language was Sogdian. It is unknown who made the translation and when, and only small fragments of Matthew, Luke, John, 1 Corinthians, and Galatians have survived. Generally, these are interlinear Syriac-Sogdian text-types dating from the 10th to the 11th centuries. The text of these fragments shows close textual affinity with the Syriac Peshitta. The most important partially preserved manuscript is a lectionary with fragments of the mentioned three Gospels (no fragment of Mark has been found), which besides the influence of the Peshitta also contains elements indicating Old Syriac or Diatessaron sources. All Sogdian translation fragments come from one place and were discovered in 1905 in the ruins of the former Nestorian monastery in Bulayiq near Turpan by the expedition of Albert von Le Coq.

== Caucasian Albanian translation ==
One of the peoples living in the Caucasus were the Albanians. During the 5th to 11th centuries, they were followers of the Christian faith and had their own literature. Unfortunately, all literature in their own language has been lost. According to Armenian tradition, St. Mesrop, in addition to creating the Armenian and Georgian alphabets, also created the Albanian alphabet and is said to have evangelized the Albanians through his two disciples. Somewhat later, according to the same tradition, Bishop Jeremiah was supposed to have translated the Scriptures into the Caucasian Albanian language. It is unknown how much of the Bible was translated, as the translation has been entirely lost.

== Nubian translation ==
Between Egypt and Ethiopia, there were three Nubian kingdoms. The first Christians arrived in Nubia during the persecutions of Diocletian. However, Christianity spread in this country only in the 6th century. It is not known when the translation into the Nubian language was made; the oldest manuscript fragments date back to the 8th century. The textual character deviates from the classical division of Greek manuscripts. It has some features of the Byzantine text-type as well as all other text-types, including Family 1739.

The first manuscript in the Nubian language was discovered in 1906. It contains a fragment of a lectionary. In the 20th century, other fragments in this language were also discovered.

== Church Slavonic translation ==
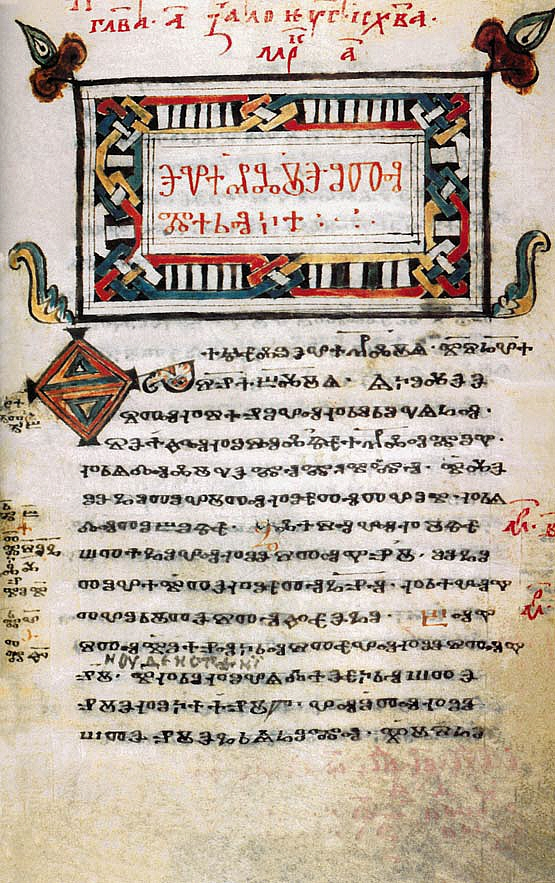
Codex Zographensis

The first translation into the Slavic language was initiated before the year 863 by St. Cyril (d. 869). The work was undertaken with the Balkan Slavs in mind and initially was limited only to the Gospels and liturgical passages (from Acts, the Epistles, and the Psalms). The translation was made based on an early form of the Byzantine text-type – the same one used in the Peshitta. However, significant differences exist between the manuscripts. Some of them contain a large number of Western readings, likely resulting from a revision based on the Vulgate in Moravia (after 863). After Cyril's death, his brother, St. Methodius, continued the work and completed the translation of the entire Bible except for the Books of Maccabees. However, his work has been lost.

In the critical editions of the Greek New Testament of Nestle-Åland, the following manuscripts are cited:

- Codex Zographensis, written in Glagolitic script, dated to the late 10th or early 11th century. It contains the text of the four Gospels on 287 out of 303 pages. The manuscript was discovered in 1843 in the Zograf Monastery on Mount Athos and is preserved in the National Library of Russia in St. Petersburg.
- Codex Marianus, written in Glagolitic script, dating from the late 10th or early 11th century. It contains the four Gospels. Discovered in 1845 on Mount Athos. Two pages of the codex are kept in the Austrian National Library, while the remaining 173 pages are in Moscow.
- Codex Assemanius, usually dated to the 11th century (although Vais advocated the 10th century), written in Glagolitic script. It contains a short selection of Gospel readings for Saturdays and Sundays throughout the year, as well as for all days from Easter to Pentecost. Discovered in 1736 in Jerusalem. 158 pages have survived (with a few at the end missing), currently preserved in the Vatican Library. The text has been published several times, first in 1865.
- Sava's book, Cyrillic script from the 11th century, consisting of 166 pages. Discovered in 1866 near Pskov and currently housed in Moscow. The text was published in 1903.
- The Apostolos of the Blind: Dating from the 12th century, with its text published in 1912.

Three manuscripts convey bilingual Greek-Slavonic text-type (manuscripts 525, 2136, 2137).

Church Slavonic manuscripts were first cited in the edition of the Greek New Testament by Franz Karl Alter in 1786–1787. Josef Vais prepared a critical edition of the text of the four Gospels in 1935–1936. The edition records approximately 2500 variants.

== Other translations ==
At the end of the first millennium, translations into: Old English (8th/9th century), Old Low German, Old High German, and Old French (Provençal) emerged. All four translations were made from the Vulgate, whose text-type had already been influenced by Itala, and therefore, for research on the Greek text-type of the New Testament, these translations are of lesser significance. However, the Old English translation is important for reconstructing the history of the Latin Bible.

== The significance for textual criticism ==
In contemporary critical editions of the Greek New Testament, the greatest importance is attributed to translations into Latin, Syriac, and Coptic dialects. Each of these translations was made directly from the Greek language in the early period and has been examined in great detail. For 19th-century textual criticism, these translations were important because they were from a period for which no known Greek manuscript existed (the oldest being from the 4th century). In the 20th century, many Greek manuscripts from the early period were discovered, reducing the significance of these translations. While Westcott and Hort attempted to reconstruct the Greek text-type of the 2nd century based on the Old Latin and Old Syriac translations (in conjunction with Codex Bezae), today it is no longer necessary due to the large number of Greek manuscripts from the 2nd century. Nevertheless, these translations are still important, primarily for linking Greek textual families to their region of origin and reconstructing local textual traditions, aided by patristic citations.

In the 27th edition of the Nestle-Åland's Greek New Testament (NA27), the critical apparatus also cites translations into Armenian, Georgian, Gothic, Ethiopian, and Church Slavonic languages. These translations are rarely cited and only when they have special significance for particular variants (e.g., Mk 16:8). A drawback of these translations is that over time they underwent certain modifications under the influence of other translations.

Translations into Arabic, Nubian, Sogdian, Old English, Old Low German, Old High German, and Old French are omitted in critical editions.

Only those variants attested by Greek manuscripts or independently attested by another translation are cited in the critical apparatus. There are a few exceptions, such as Jas 1:17, where besides the translation, only the patristic testimony is referenced. Before including any variant in the critical apparatus, the difference between the Greek language and the language of the translation is examined, and any variants resulting from limitations in the structure of the given language or stylistic differences are disregarded. In situations where translation variants are doubtful, they are not taken into account.

== See also ==
- Early Greek New Testament manuscripts

== Bibliography ==
=== Text editions ===
- B. et K. Aland; J. Karavidopoulos; C. M. Martini; B. M. Metzger (2006). "Introduction". Novum Testamentum Graece. Vol. 27. Stuttgart: Deutsche Bibelgesellschaft. pp. 63–72. ISBN 978-3-438-05100-4. [NA27]
- Horner, G. (1898–1905). The Coptic Version of the New Testament in the Northern Dialect, otherwise called Memphitic and Bohairic. OCLC 609214040. 4 vols. (repr. Osnabrück: 1969)
- Horner, G. (1911–1924). The Coptic Version of the New Testament in the Southern Dialect, otherwise called Sahidic and Thebaic. OCLC 612652771. 7 vols. (repr. Osnabrück: 1969)
- Tischendorf, K. v. (1854). Codex Amiatinus. Novum Testamentum Latine interpreter Hieronymo. Lipsiae: Avenaius et Mendelssohn.

=== Introductions ===
- Aland, Kurt; Aland, Barbara (1989). Der Text des Neuen Testaments: Einführung in die wissenschaftlichen Ausgaben sowie in Theorie und Praxis der modernen Textkritik (in German). Vol. 2. Stuttgart: Deutsche Bibelgesellschaft. pp. 191–221. ISBN 3-438-06011-6.
- M. Black; K. Aland (1972). Die alten Übersetzungen des Neuen Testaments, die Kirchenväterzitate und Lektionare: der gegenwärtige Stand ihrer Erforschung und ihre Bedeutung für die griechische Textgeschichte (in German). Vol. 2. Berlin: Walter de Gruyter. ISBN 3-11-004121-9.
- Gregory, Caspar René (1902). Textkritik des Neuen Testamentes (in German). Vol. 2. Leipzig: J.C. Hinrichs.
- Kenyon, Frederic George (1939). Our Bible and the Ancient Manuscripts. Vol. 4. London: Eyre & Spottiswoode.
- Metzger, B.M. (1977). The Early Versions of the New Testament: Their Origin, Transmission and Limitations. Vol. 3. Oxford: Clarendon Press. ISBN 0-19-826170-5.
- Metzger, Bruce M.; Brock, Sebastian P. (1977). "Limitations of Syriac in representing Greek". The Early Versions of the New Testament. pp. 83–98.
- Metzger, Bruce M.; Fischer, Bonifatius (1977). "Limitations of Latin in Representing Greek". The Early Versions of the New Testament. pp. 362–374.
- Metzger, Bruce M.; Plumley, J. Martin (1977). "Limitations of Coptic (Sahidic) in representing Greek". The Early Versions of the New Testament. pp. 141–152.
- Metzger, Bruce M.; Rhodes, Erroll F. (1977). "Limitations of Armenian in representing Greek". The Early Versions of the New Testament. pp. 171–181.
- Metzger, Bruce M.; Ehrman, Bart D. (2005). The Text of the New Testament: Its Transmission, Corruption, and Restoration. Vol. 4. New York, Oxford: Oxford University Press. pp. 94–126. ISBN 978-0-19-516122-9.
- Nestle, Eberhard (1901). Introduction to the Textual Criticism of the Greek New Testament. Translated by Edie, William. Oxford: Williams and Norgate.

=== Other works ===
- Conybeare, Frederick Cornwallis (1918). Catalogue of the Armenian Manuscripts in the Bodleian Library.
- Easton, Burton Scott. "Versions, Georgian, Gothic, Slavonic". International Standard Bible Encyclopedia Online.
- Kasser, R. (1958). Papyrus Bodmer III. Evangile de Jean et Genese I-IV, 2 en bohairique. Corpus Scriptorum Christianorum Orientalium, Scriptores Coptici, 25. Vol. 177 (1st ed.). Louvain: Peeters.
- Leśny, Jan (1987). Konstantyn i Metody – apostołowie Słowian, dzieło i jego losy. Poznań: Księgarnia Św. Wojciecha. p. 39. ISBN 8370150977.
- Metzger, Bruce M. (1991). Manuscripts of the Greek Bible. An Introduction to Greek Palaeography. New York, Oxford: Oxford University Press. ISBN 978-0-19-502924-6.
- Moszyński, Leszek (2006). Wstęp do filologii słowiańskiej. Vol. 2. Warsaw: Państwowe Wydawnictwo Naukowe. ISBN 8301147202.
- Munkhammar, Lars. "Codex Argenteus. From Ravenna to Uppsala. The wanderings of a Gothic manuscript from the early sixth century".
- Nicol, T. "Syriac Versions". International Standard Bible Encyclopedia Online.
- Rhodes, E.F. (1959). An Annotated List of Armenian New Testament Manuscripts. Tokyo: Department of Christian Studies, Rikkyo University.
- Sims-Williams, Nicholas (2014). "BIBLE v. Sogdian Translations". Encyclopædia Iranica.
- Tronina, Antoni (1986). "Tekst Pisma Świętego". Wstęp Ogólny do Pisma Świętego. Poznań: Pallottinum.
- Turner, C.H. (1931). The Oldest Manuscript of the Vulgate Gospels. Oxford: The Clarendon Press.
- Quentin, Henri (1922). Mémoire sur l'établissement du texte de la Vulgate (in French). Rome: Desclée.
- Thompson, H. (1912). The New Biblical Texts in the Dialect of Upper Egypt. London: Printed by order of the Trustees.
- Vööbus, A. (1951). Studies in the History of the Gospel Text in Syriac. Louvain: L. Durbecq.
- Wright, W. (2002). Catalogue of the Syriac Manuscripts in the British Museum. Gorgias Press LLC.
- "Armenian Institute of Ancient Manuscripts gets first-ever printed Armenian language Bible". Armenian News. 2013-05-08. Archived from the original on 2013-11-05.
- "The Coptic Bible translation". The Schøyen Collection. 2013-11-04. Archived from the original on 2007-03-02.
- "Manuscripts of the Gothic Bible and Minor Fragments". wulfila.be/Project Wulfila. University of Antwerp, Belgium. 2006-12-07.
