= Tremoli =

Village in Calabria, Italy

Coordinates: 39.835°N 15.881°E

Tremoli is a village in the Comune of Papasidero, in the province of Cosenza, Calabria, and is home to 70 inhabitants.

Located 350m above sea level, Tremoli is situated in the southern Apennine mountains on the Orsomarso massif within the Valle del Fiume Lao nature reserve, in the Pollino National Park. The village sits on the west bank of the river Lao and is home to the Church of San Michele Arcangelo.

The earliest known mention of Tremoli is the donation of the Byzantine cenobium of St. San Nicola (in Tremoli, since lost) to the La Trinità della Cava dated at the end of the 11th or early years of the 12th century. The record of which is kept in the Biblioteca statale del Monumento Nazionale Badia di Cava.
