= Codex Theodulphianus =

8th or 9th-century Latin manuscript of the Old and New Testament

The Codex Theodulphianus, designated Θ, is an 8th or 9th-century Latin manuscript of the Old and New Testament. The text, written on vellum, is a version of the Latin Vulgate Bible. It contains the whole Bible, with some parts written on purple vellum.

== Description ==
The Book of Psalms and the four Gospels are written on purple parchment in letters of silver (initial letters are in gold). The text is written in a minute minuscule hand. The Latin text of the Gospel is a representative of the Theodulphianus recension of the Vulgate, and is considered the most important witness of this recension (other manuscripts are Codex Annicensis and Codex Hubertatus). It bears a strong textual resemblance to the Codex Hubertanus, although it is written in a smaller hand. The text of the Gospel of Matthew is very close to the Codex Cavensis. The Books of Kings, Book of Chronicles, Book of Ezra, and Pauline epistles (partially) are close textually to the Spanish type of the Vulgate. In Book of Genesis, Book of Joshua, and Book of Judges, the text is close to the Codex Amiatinus.

The Codex contains the Comma Johanneum (1 John 5:7), a spurious text referring to the trinity, in its usual location (unlike the Codex Cavensis and Codex Toletanus).

== History ==
E. A. Lowe dated the manuscript to the eight or ninth century. Formerly it belonged to the Cathedral of Orleans, the family of the Mesmes, then to the National Library of France. The manuscript was examined and described by Samuel Berger. It was collated by John Wordsworth and H. J. White for their edition of the text of the Vulgate. Currently the manuscript is housed in the Bibliothèque nationale de France in Paris (Lat. 9380).

== See also ==
- List of New Testament Latin manuscripts
