= Correctory =

A correctory (plural correctories) is any of the text-forms of the Latin Vulgate resulting from the critical emendation as practised during the course of the thirteenth century.

== Antecedents ==
Owing to the carelessness of transcribers, the conjectural corrections of critics, the insertion of glosses and paraphrases, and especially to the preference for readings found in the earlier Latin versions, the text of Jerome was corrupted at an early date. Around 550 CE, Cassiodorus made an attempt at restoring the purity of the Latin text.

Charlemagne entrusted the same labour to Alcuin, who presented his royal patron with a corrected copy in 801. Similar attempts were repeated by Theodulphus, Bishop of Orléans [787(?) – 821], Lanfranc, Archbishop of Canterbury (1070–1089), Stephen Harding, Abbot of Cîteaux (1109–1134), and Nicolaus Maniacoria (about the beginning of the thirteenth century).

== Dominican ==
The general chapter of the Dominicans held in 1236 connects a corrected text of the Latin Bible with the members of the province of France; it ordained that all Bibles should be conformed to this. Little more is known of this work but the following correctories are more noted:

- The Biblia Senonensis, or the Bible of Sens, is not the Paris Bible as approved of by the Archbishop of Sens, nor is it a particular text adopted by the ecclesiastical authority of that city, but it is a correction of the Paris Bible prepared by the Dominican priests residing there. Whatever be the value of this correctory, it did not meet with the approval of the Dominican Order, as may be inferred from an ordination of the general chapter held in Paris, 1256. Quotations from it found in the Correctorium Sorbonicum resemble the readings of the Latin manuscript No. 17 in the National Library, Paris. The Dominicans of Sens failed to produce a satisfactory text because they were too sparing in their emendation of the Paris Bible.
- Hugues of Saint-Cher tried to restore the primitive text of the Latin Vulgate, which in his day was practically identical with the Paris Bible, by removing its glosses and all foreign accretions. But instead of having recourse to the manuscripts of Jerome's text he compared the Paris Bible with the original Hebrew and Greek readings, thus furnishing a new version rather than a correctory. Roger Bacon calls his work "the worst corruption, the destruction of the text of God". Eight manuscripts of Hugues' correctory are still extant.
- Theobald is the name of the Dominican priest who is usually connected with the next correction of the Latin Vulgate text, which appeared about 1248. The text of this too resembles that of the Latin manuscript No. 17 in the National Library, Paris, and is thus related to the Correctorium Senonense. It may be identical with the Correctio Parisiensis secunda, quoted in the Correctorium Sorbonicum.
- Another correctory was prepared about 1256 in the Dominican convent of Saint-Jacques, Paris. The manuscript thus corrected contains a text as bad as, if not worse than, the Bible of Paris, the readings of which were carried into the new correctory. The principles of Hugues of Saint-Cher were followed by the correctors, who marked in red the words to be omitted, and added marginal notes to explain changes and suggest variants. They are more copious in the Old Testament than in the New. The autograph is preserved in the National Library, Paris, Manuscripts lat. 16,719-16,722.

== Franciscan ==
The Franciscan writer Roger Bacon was the first to formulate the true principles which ought to guide the correction of the Latin Vulgate; his religious brethren endeavoured to apply them, though not always successfully.

- The Correctorium Sorbonicum, probably the work of William the Breton, was so-named because the thirteenth-century manuscript in which the emendations were made belonged to the Sorbonne Library, though at present it is kept in the Bibliothèque nationale de France, Manuscript lat. 15554, fol. 147-253. The marginal and interlinear glosses are derived from the Paris Bible and the correctory of the Dominican priest Theobald; the make-up of the work imitates the Dominican correctories.
- The Correctorium Vaticanum owes its name to the circumstance that its first known manuscript was the Cod. Vaticanus lat. 3466, though at present eight other copies are known, belonging to the thirteenth or the beginning of the fourteenth century. Its author is William de la Mare, of Oxford, a disciple of Roger Bacon, whose principles and methods he follows. Though acquainted with several Latin and Hebrew manuscripts, the Targum, the commentaries of Rashi, and the original texts, he relied more on the authority of the early manuscripts of Jerome's text. There are some faults in the correctory, resulting mainly from the author's limited knowledge of Greek.
- Gérard de Huy was a faithful follower of Roger Bacon's principles; the old Latin manuscripts and the readings of the Church Fathers are his first authority, and only when they disagree does he have recourse to the original texts. He knew no Latin manuscripts older than those of the ninth and tenth centuries containing a text of Alcuin's recension. But Gérard knew the history of the versions and the origin of the textual corruptions of the Sacred Scriptures. He corrected the Paris Bible and gave an account of his emendations in his marginal notes.
- Two more Franciscan correctories are Manuscript 61 (Toulouse), of the fifteenth century, which reproduces the correctory of Gérard de Buxo, of Avignon, a work rather exegetical than critical in character; and Manuscript 28 (Einsiedeln), of the beginning of the fourteenth century, containing the work of John of Cologne.

== Allied ==
Eugène Mangenot mentions six other groups of correctories which have not been fully investigated yet.

Two of them are allied to the Dominican correctory of the convent of Saint-Jacques; one is represented by the Manuscript lat. 15,554, fol. 1–146, National Library, Paris; the other by Cod. Laurent., Plut., XXV, sin., cod. 4, fol. 101–107 (Florence), and by Manuscript 131, fol. 1, Arsenal, Paris.

Two other groups are allied to the Franciscan correctories; one, represented by Cod. 141, lat. class. I, fol. 121-390, Marciana (Venice), depends on William de la Mare and Gérard de Huy; the other, found in Manuscript 82, Borges. (Rome), depends on Gérard de Huy.

Finally two very brief correctories are to be found in Manuscript 492, Antoniana, Padua, and in Manuscript Cent. I, 47, fol. 127, Nuremberg.
