= Uncial 0136 =

- New Testament manuscript
- Text: Gospel of Matthew 14; 25-26 †
- Date: 9th century
- Script: Greek-Arabic
- Found: Sinai, Rendel Harris
- Now at: Russian National Library
- Size: 33 x 27 cm
- Type: Byzantine text-type
- Category: V

Uncial 0136 (in the Gregory-Aland numbering), ε 91 (Soden), is a Greek-Arabic diglot uncial manuscript of the New Testament, dated palaeographically to the 9th century. Formerly it was labelled by Θ^{h}.

== Description ==
The codex contains a small part of the Gospel of Matthew 14:6-13; 25:9-16; 25:41-26:1, on 3 parchment leaves (33 cm by 27 cm). It is written in two columns per page, 16 lines per page, in large uncial letters.

It has breathings and accents.

The codex was taken from Sinai and now is located in the National Library of Russia (Gr. 281) in Saint Petersburg.

The manuscript 0136 was part of the same codex to which Uncial 0137 belonged. They were divided in the 19th century and catalogued under different numbers. Uncial 0137 contains Matt. 13:46-52. It is Greek-Arabic diglot. It was found by Rendel Harris at Sinai.

Currently it is dated by the INTF to the 9th century.

Uncial 0137 is still located in Sinai Harris 9 in the Saint Catherine's Monastery in Mount Sinai in Egypt.

The Greek text of this codex is a representative of the Byzantine text-type. Aland placed it in Category V.

== See also ==
- List of New Testament uncials
- Textual criticism
