= Biblioteca statale del Monumento Nazionale Badia di Cava =

State Library of the National Monument of the Abbey of Cava de Tirreni
- Biblioteca statale del Monumento Nazionale Badia di Cava
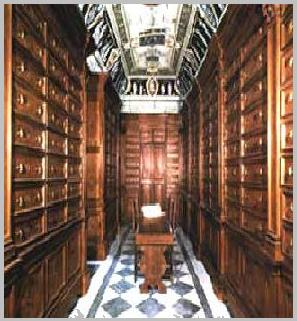
- Hall of the library
- 40.682296281154045°N 14.691180284671596°E
- Location: Italy
- Type: national library

Collection
- Size: 97,784 item (2019), 103,693 item (2022), 100,026 volume, 120 item, 439 item (2019), 439 item (2022), 98,017 item (2020), 98,017 item (2021)

Other information
- Website: https://www.bibliotecabadiadicava.it/

The Biblioteca statale del Monumento Nazionale Badia di Cava or the State Library of the National Monument of the Abbey of Cava de' Tirreni, is a national library whose collection originated with works from the Benedictine abbey of La Trinità della Cava, located on Via Michele Morcaldi 6, Cava de' Tirreni, province of Salerno, region of Campania, Italy.

The library's origins come from the foundation of the abbey in the 11th century, when the abbey founded a scriptorium. The library lost much of its original collection during the 15th century. However, later abbots protected the integrity of the library, going as far as obtaining in 1595 a papal bull from Pope Clement VIII banning the extraction of books from the library. A further loss however occurred during a rock fall occurring on Christmas' eve in 1796. After the 19th-century suppression of the monasteries, the abbey had some degree of protection since monks were employed as custodians of the abbey.

The library contains 15,000 parchment pages including 65 codices; 430 manuscript volumes; 25,000 loose manuscript documents; 120 incunabolae; 1,663 16th century books; 77,500 printed books; and 197 journals, of which 86 are current.

Among the treasures of the collection are a 9th-century Visigothic Bible (La Cava Bible), the 9th-century Codex legum Langobardorum (a compendium of the Ancient Germanic law of the Lombards; the 8th-century Etymologiae by Isidore of Seville, an 11th-century De Temporibus by Bede, and a 12th-century De septem sigillis by Benedetto da Bari.

== Sources ==
- Mattei-Cerasoli, Leone (1932). Guida storica e bibliografica degli archivi e delle biblioteche d'Italia, Volume 4: Badia della SS. Trinità di Cava (in Italian), Roma 1932.

=== The Mss. ===
- Codex Diplomaticus Cavensis (in Latin), ed. M. Morcaldi, M. Schiani, S. De Stefano. Vols. I-VIII. Naples: Pietro Piazzi; Milan: Hoepli 1876-1893.
- Codex Diplomaticus Cavensis (in Latin), ed. S. Leone, G. Vitolo. Vols. IX-X. Badia di Cava 1894, 1890.
- Codex Diplomaticus Cavensis (in Latin), ed. C. Carlone, L. Morinelli, G. Vitolo Vols. XI-XII. Badia di Cava 2015.
