= Codex Toletanus =

10th-century Latin manuscript of the Old and New Testament

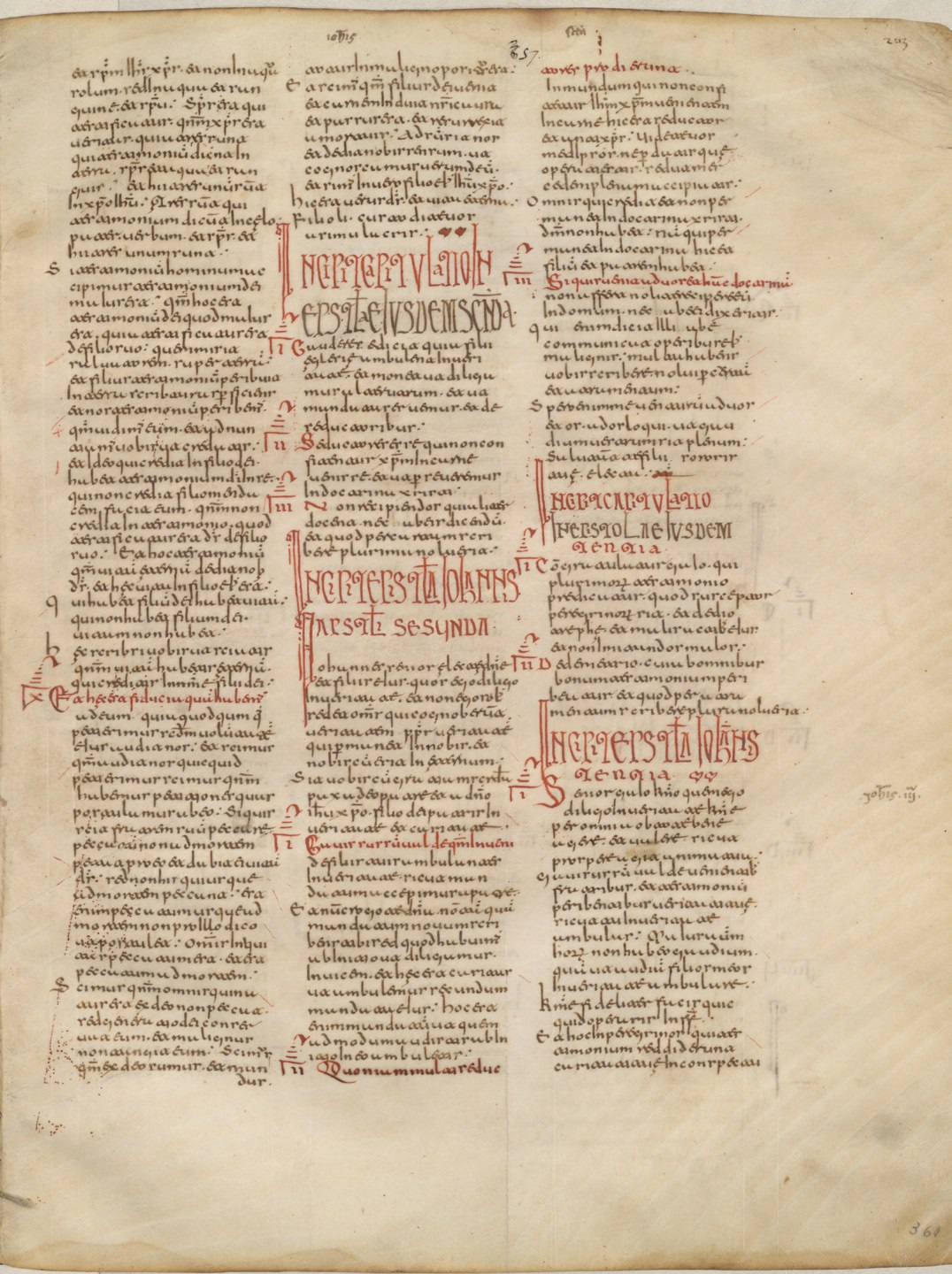
Codex Toletanus

The Codex Toletanus, designated by T, also called Biblia hispalense or Seville Bible, is a 10th-century Latin manuscript of the Old and New Testament. The text, written on vellum, is a version of the Latin Vulgate Bible, which contains the entire Bible, including the trinity reference Comma Johanneum.

== Description ==
The text is written in three columns, 63-65 lines in a single column, in Visigothic characters, on 375 parchment leaves (43,8 by 33 cm). The Latin text of the four Gospels is a representative of the Spanish type of the Vulgate. It is the second important manuscript of the Spanish type (after Codex Cavensis). It contains the controverted text of the Comma Johanneum (1 John 5:7) in the same location as the Codex Cavensis (after v. 8). And it also contains the Prologue to the Canonical Epistles affirming the verse.

== History ==
According to the note, Servandus of Seville gave the manuscript to his friend John, Bishop of Cordova, who in turn offered it in 988 CE to the see of Servandus. The note was examined by A. Lowe, L. F. Smith, and A. C. Millares. The year 988 is usually regarded by scholars as a date of the completion of the codex. The manuscript was collated by Chr. Palomares for the Sixtine Vulgate, whose work written in 1569 is now presented in the Vatican Library (Lat. 9508). It was not used in the Vulgata Clementina, as the manuscript was reached by Cardinal Antonio Carafa too late. The text was published by Giuseppe Bianchini in 1740. It was collated by John Wordsworth for his edition of the New Testament of Vulgate. Wordsworth designated the manuscript by siglum T. Currently the manuscript is housed in the National Library of Spain in Madrid (MS. Tol. 2. 1).

== See also ==
- List of New Testament Latin manuscripts
- Codex Legionensis
