= Nicolaus Maniacoria =

Christian monk, philologist and Italian writer (12th century)

Nicolaus Maniacoria (c. 1100 – c. 1160) was a Roman churchman, Hebraist, biblical commentator and textual critic. He is known today for his knowledge of languages and his theoretical sophistication.

His first name may be anglicized Nicholas or italianized Nicolò. His surname is spelled many ways: Maniacoria, Maniacutia, Magnacutius, Magnacoze, Manicoria and Maniacocia.

== Life ==
What little is known of Nicolaus' life has been pieced together from his writings. He was probably born shortly after 1100 in Rome. Around 1145, he was a deacon of San Lorenzo in Damaso. During this period, he wrote his Suffraganeus bibliothecae and several saints' lives. He copied a complete Bible for a woman named Constantia, who died in 1144 or 1145. She may have been his mother. He also copied the Psalms for a nun and noblewoman named Scotta, including marginal notes on variations in the Hebrew text.

Nicolaus later joined the Cistercians. He may have entered Tre Fontane Abbey, but this is not certain. A proposed connection with Santa Pudenziana is also uncertain. He may have later served as a canon at the Lateran Basilica, but his too is uncertain. There is no basis for the claims that Nicolaus was a cardinal or a papal librarian.

Nicolaus probably died around 1160.

== Works ==
Nicolaus' magnum opus, the Suffraganeus bibliothecae (meaning 'aid to the Bible'), is a commentary on the literal sense of the Old Testament. He wrote it shortly after the election of Pope Eugene III in February 1145. It is most famous for its theoretical introduction, in which outlines the three ways in which a text can become corrupted in copying (addition, substitution, omission) with examples of each. In the commentary itself, Nicolaus cites Jerome, Pseudo-Jerome, the Glossae biblicae vaticanae, Rashi, Abraham ibn Ezra and Hugh of Saint Victor's De sacramentis.

During his Cistercian period, Nicolaus wrote the Libellus de corruptione et correptione Psalmorum, a critical study of the text of the Latin Psalter.

== Bibliography ==
- Champagne, Marie Thérèse (2011). "Both Text and Subtext: The Circulation and Preservation of Two Manuscripts of Nicolaus Maniacutius in Twelfth-Century Europe". Textual Cultures. 6 (1): 26–47. doi:10.2979/textcult.6.1.26.
- Champagne, Marie Thérèse (2017). "Christian Hebraism in Twelfth-Century Rome: A Philologist's Correction of the Latin Bible through Dialogue with Jewish Scholars and their Hebrew Texts". Studies in Church History. 53: 71–87. doi:10.1017/stc.2016.6.
- Chiesa, Paolo (2007). "Maniacutia, Nicolò". Dizionario Biografico degli Italiani (in Italian). Vol. 69: Mangiabotti–Marconi. Rome: Istituto dell'Enciclopedia Italiana. ISBN 978-88-12-00032-6.
- Monfasani, John (2008). "Criticism of Biblical Humanists in Quattrocento Italy". In Erika Rummel (ed.). A Companion to Biblical Humanism and Scholasticism in the Age of Erasmus. Brill. pp. 15–38. doi:10.1163/ej.9789004145733.I-335.6. ISBN 978-90-474-4204-2.
- Linde, J. Cornelia, ed. (2013a). Nicolaus Maniacoria, Suffraganeus Bibliothece. CCCM, 262. Brepols.
- Linde, J. Cornelia (2013b). "Basic Instruction and Hebrew Learning: Nicolaus Maniacoria's Suffraganeus bibliothece". Recherches de théologie et philosophie médiévales. 80 (1): 1–16. JSTOR 26485541.
- van Liere, Frans (2015). "Review of Linde 2013a". The Journal of Medieval Latin. 25: 270–272. doi:10.1484/j.jml.5.110218.
