= La Cava Bible =

Vidigoda Manustric Bible from the 9th century

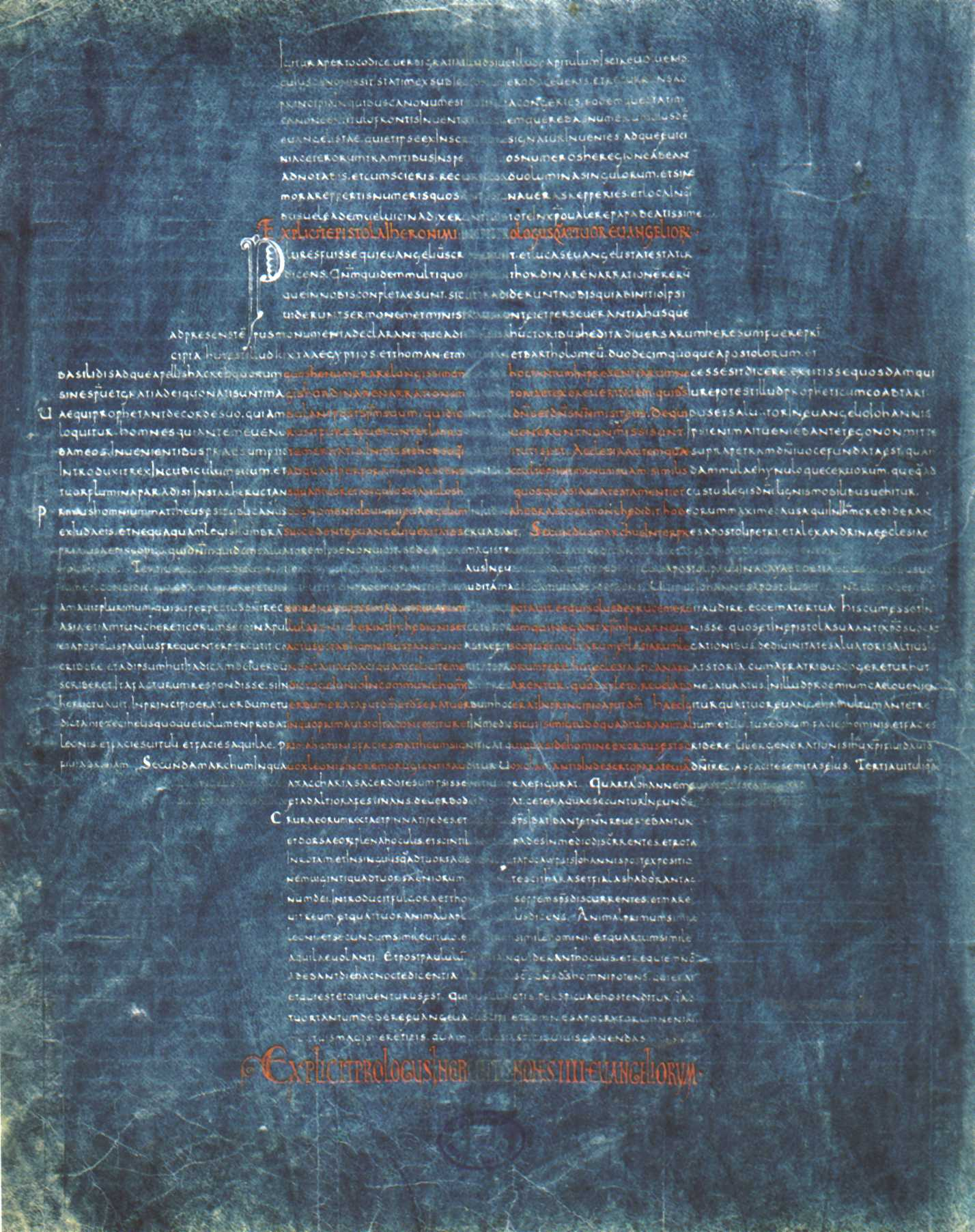
Folio 220v of the La Cava Bible

The La Cava Bible or Codex Cavensis (Cava de' Tirreni, Biblioteca statale del Monumento Nazionale Badia di Cava, Ms. memb. I) is a 9th-century Latin illuminated Bible, which was produced in Spain, probably in the Kingdom of Asturias during the reign of Alfonso II. The manuscript is preserved at the abbey of La Trinità della Cava, near Cava de' Tirreni in Campania, Italy, and contains 330 vellum folios which measure 320 by 260 mm.

== Origin ==
The Bible was signed on folio 166v by a scribe named Danila. The location of the scriptorium where Danila worked is not known. However the hand, textual variations, and orthography indicate that the manuscript was produced in Spain, during the early 9th century. This makes Asturias, which was the largest Christian kingdom of the time, the most probable origin of the codex. Additional evidence of an Asturian origin is provided by the decoration of the manuscript. The Cross which appears in four locations in the La Cava Bible, is the only explicitly Christian decoration in the manuscript. Although the form of the Crosses in the La Cava Bible do not appear in other surviving Asturian art, the Cross was emphasized in Asturian devotional art. For example, both Alfonso II and Alfonso III commissioned gold crosses, like the Victory Cross and the Cross of the Angels. "Cross of the Resurrection" was a prominent feature of murals at San Julián de los Prados, near Oviedo, Asturias.

== Decoration ==
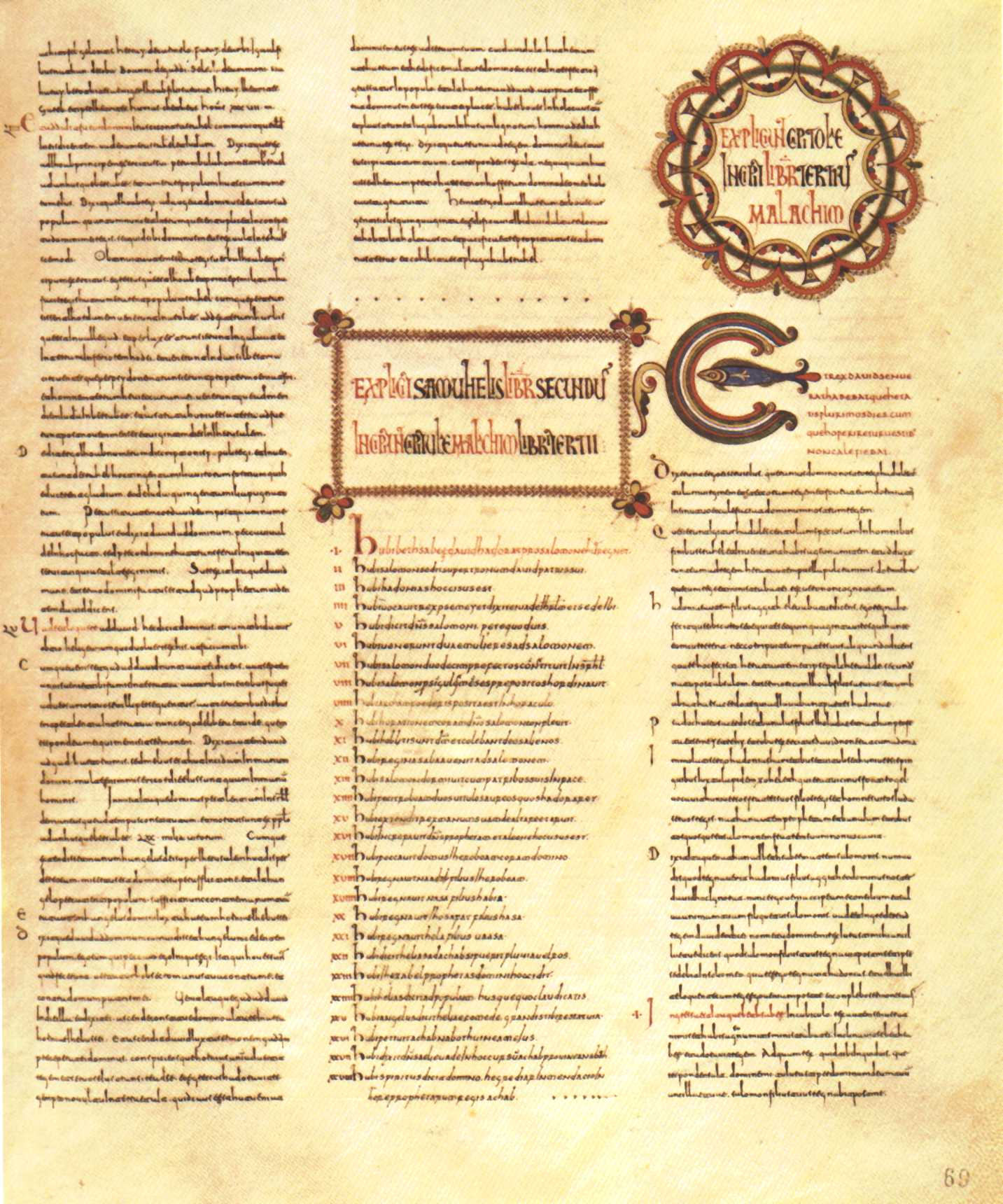
Folio 69r of the La Cava Bible

The decoration of the La Cava Bible is limited to the four crosses mentioned above, frames surrounding explicits and titles, and decorated initials. There are two linear, compass drawn Crosses, one serving as frontispiece on folio 1 verso, and the other in the introduction to the prophetical books on folio 143 recto. On folio 100 verso the title frame for the Psalms is in the form of a cross. The text on folio 220 verso, which contains the prefaces by Jerome used to introduce the New Testament, is written in the form of a cross. This text is written in red, white and yellow inks on a blue-stained folio. There is one other folio stained blue and three folios stained purple in this manuscript. The frames surrounding the explicits and titles are similar in form to frames found in the earliest medieval illuminated books. However, Danila exploited brilliant and contrasting hues of color not found in earlier manuscripts. The decorated initials include initial types commonly associated with Merovingian illumination. However similar initials also occurred in Visigothic manuscripts.

It is likely that Danila copied this manuscript from an earlier, now-lost, Visigothic manuscript. The title and explicit frames are similar to those found in early manuscripts and the pages written in coloured inks are related to Late Antique manuscripts written in gold and silver on purple-dyed parchment. (For example, see Rossano Gospels). However Danila's use of colour was probably not present in the original manuscript and anticipates the use of colour in later Spanish manuscripts.

Although Danila may have been aware of Merovingian initials, it is also equally likely that his initials share in common the models for Merovingian initials. The manuscript gives no indication that Danila was influenced by contemporary Carolingian illumination. However, Carolingian Bibles produced under the patronage of Theodulph of Orleans, who had Visigothic parentage, do have similar text and organization to that found in the La Cava Bible, something not found in other similar Carolingian manuscripts.

== Text ==
It is one of the two most important representatives of the Spanish type of Vulgate text, and in the Old Testament presents a text believed to be derived from very old Italian exemplars. In the Stuttgart Vulgate the La Cava Bible stands alongside the Codex Amiatinus as primary witnesses for almost all the books of the Old Testament. The text of the Gospels shows signs of being a revision, being mingled with Old Latin elements. The manuscript contains the Comma Johanneum with the earthly witnesses preceding the heavenly witnesses.

== See also ==
- List of New Testament Latin manuscripts
