= Theodulf of Orléans =

Writer, poet and the Bishop of Orléans

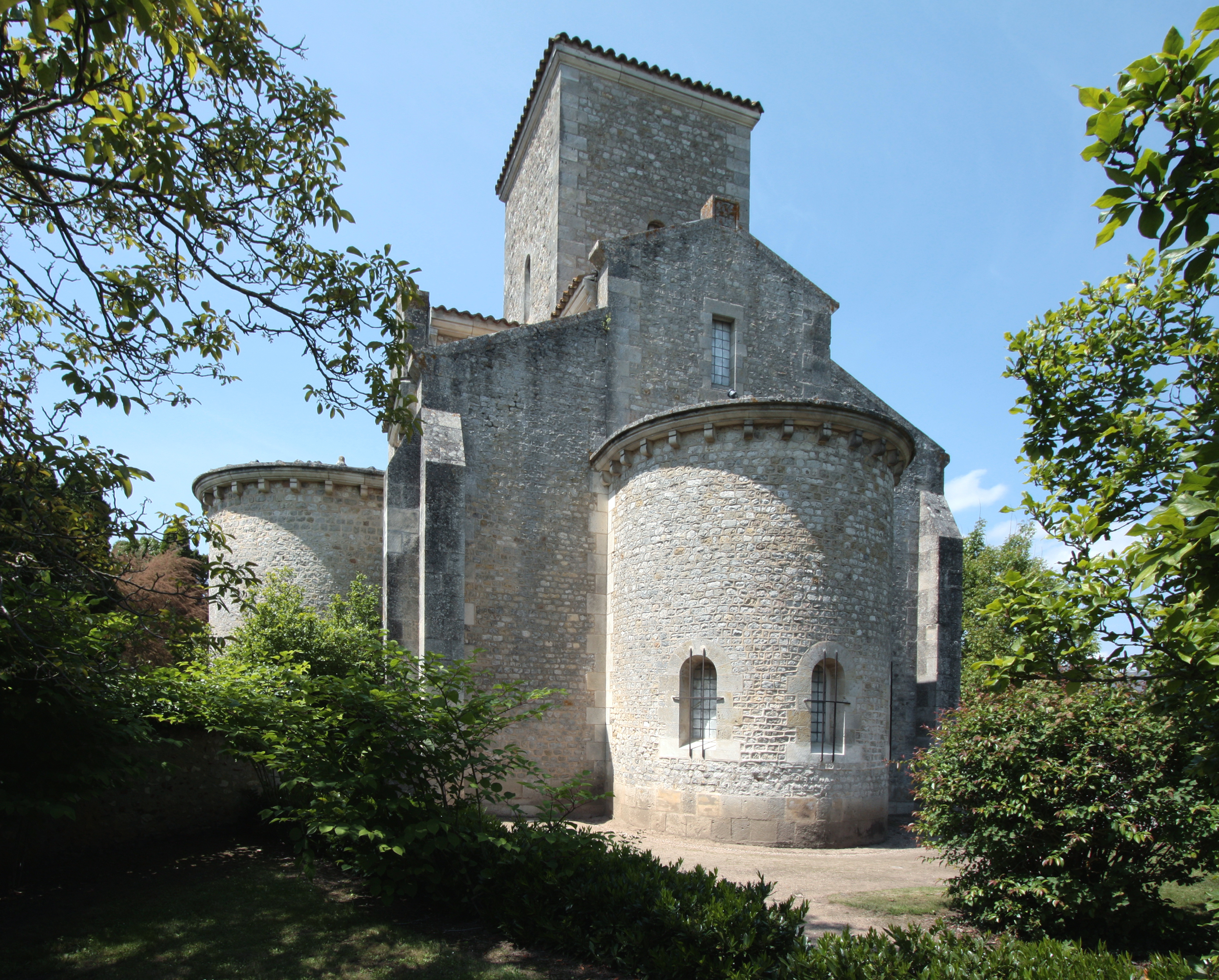
The oratory at Germigny-des-Prés, after a restoration in the 19th century.

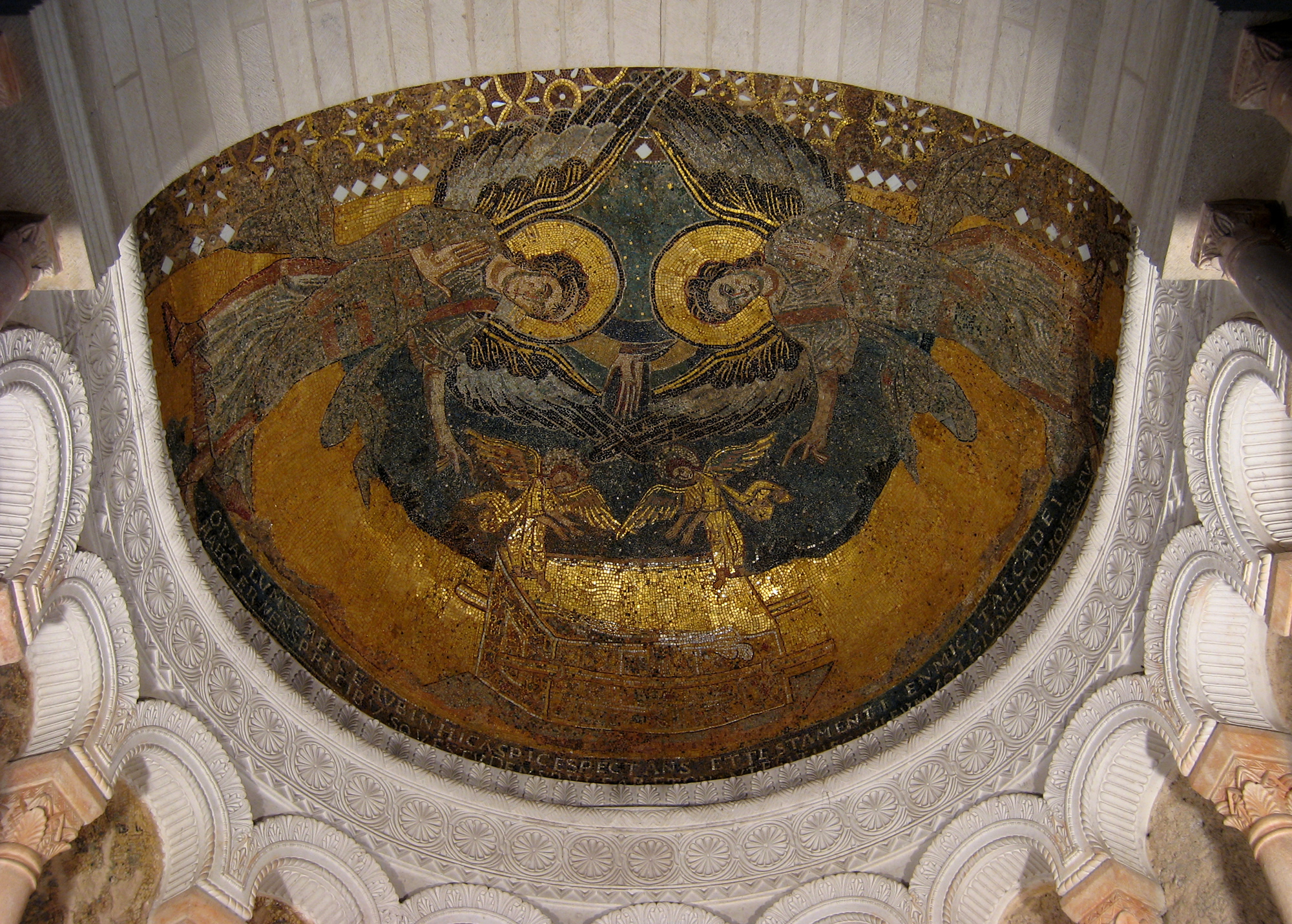
Mosaic of the Ark of the Covenant, c. 806

Theodulf of Orléans (c. 750(/60) – 18 December 821) was a writer, poet and the Bishop of Orléans (c. 798–818) during the reign of Charlemagne and Louis the Pious. He was a key member of the Carolingian Renaissance and an important figure during the many reforms of the church under Charlemagne, as well as almost certainly the author of the Libri Carolini, "much the fullest statement of the Western attitude to representational art that has been left to us by the Middle Ages". He is mainly remembered for this and the survival of the private oratory or chapel made for his villa at Germigny-des-Prés, with a mosaic probably from about 806. In Bible manuscripts produced under his influence, the Book of Baruch and the Letter of Jeremiah (as Chapter 6 of the Book of Baruch) became part of the Western (Vulgate) Bible canon.

== Life ==
Theodulf was born in Spain, probably in Zaragoza, between 750 and 760, and was of Visigothic descent. He fled Spain because of the Moorish invasion of the region and traveled to the South-Western province of Gaul called Aquitaine, where he received an education. He went on to join the monastery near Maguelonne in Southern Gaul led by the abbot Benedict of Aniane. During his trip to Rome in 786, Theodulf was inspired by the centres of learning there, and sent letters to a large number of abbots and bishops of the Frankish empire, encouraging them to establish public schools.

Charlemagne recognized Theodulf's importance within his court and simultaneously named him Bishop of Orléans (c. 798) and abbot of many monasteries, most notably the Benedictine abbey of Fleury-sur-Loire. He then went on to establish public schools outside the monastic areas which he oversaw, following through on this idea that had impressed him so much during his trip to Rome. Theodulf quickly became one of Charlemagne's favoured theologians alongside Alcuin of Northumbria and was deeply involved in many facets of Charlemagne’s desire to reform the church, for example by editing numerous translated texts that Charlemagne believed to be inaccurate and translating sacred texts directly from the classical Greek and Hebrew languages. He was a witness to the emperor's will in 811.

Charlemagne died in 814 and was succeeded by his son Louis the Pious. Louis' nephew, King Bernard of Italy, sought independence from the Frankish empire and raised his army against the latter. Bernard was talked into surrendering, but was punished by Louis severely, sentencing him to have his sight removed. The procedure of blinding Bernard went wrong and he died as a result of the operation. Louis believed that numerous people in his court were conspiring against him with Bernard, and Theodulf was one of many who were accused of treason. He was forced to abandon his position of Bishop of Orléans in 817 and was exiled to a monastery in Angers in 818 where he spent the next two years of his life. After he was released in 820, he tried to reclaim his bishopric in Orléans but was never able to reach the city because it is believed that he died during the trip or some time after that. Theodulf of Orléans died on January 18, 821, and his body was brought back to Angers where it was buried.

According to some sources Theodulf may have been married at the beginning of his career and had a daughter named Gisla.

== Villa at Germigny-des-Prés ==
The oratory at Germigny-des-Prés (Loiret, Orléanais), an example of Carolingian architecture, was built by Bishop Theodulf in 806 as part of his Gallo-Roman villa in Germaniacus. Theodulf was also abbot of the neighboring monastery of Saint-Benoît-sur-Loire. His complex at Germigny-des-Prés was in a general sense modelled on Charlemagne's Palace of Aachen, the center of the Carolingian Empire at that time.

All except the oratory was destroyed by the Normans (then just emerging from the Vikings) within a century of construction. The villa had frescos of the Seven liberal arts, the Four Seasons, and the Mappa Mundi, and the mosaic in the oratory is virtually the only Carolingian mosaic to survive, though over-restored in the 1860s, when the oratory was given what is generally agreed to have been a disastrous over-restoration and reconstruction. The subject of the mosaic, the Ark of the Covenant with attendant angels, is otherwise only found in early Jewish bibles (usually as the sole illustration), and probably relates to the Libri Carolini, where the Ark, with its golden cherubim, is mentioned as a significant proof of divine approval of religious images.

== Writings ==
=== Capitularies ===
As Bishop of Orléans (798–818), Theodulf wrote two important capitularies.

Capitula ad presbyteros parochiae

The first capitulary was a reminder to the priests of his diocese of the importance of manual labour, studying, prayer and chastity.

Capitula altera Theodulpho episcopo Aurelianensi adscripta

The second capitulary focused on his code of penance where he lists the consequences of murder, adultery, fornication, incest, thievery, usury and other infractions. It is divided in ten main parts:

- De ammonitione sacerdotum
- De adulteriis et incestis et fornicationibus
- De confessionibus laicorum
- De homicidio
- De mulierum delictis
- De furto et falso testimonio
- De inrationabili fornicatione
- De adultero presbytero publice et occulte
- De usurariis
- De inquisition octo vitiorium ad confessionem

=== Hymns and poems ===
Theodulf composed hymns and poems as well, of which 80 are preserved. Gloria, laus et honor is the most famous one of them.

=== Libri Carolini ===
Theodulf was also almost certainly responsible for composing the Libri Carolini (c. 793) which served as a rebuttal to a faulty translation of the acts of the Second Council of Nicaea of 787 which was mistakenly interpreted as saying that the worship ("adoration") of images was acceptable in the church. According to it, the Council suggested that an end was to be put to the iconoclastic period which had led to the destruction of many sacred images in the church, especially in Constantinople, which was only partially true. This translation made its way from Rome to the court of Charlemagne where it infuriated the Frankish emperor and his loyal theologians, including Theodulf, who was ordered to write the Libri Carolini in Charlemagne's name in a way that portrayed him as the sole representative of the Western world and defender of the church against a supposed idolatry.

According to the Libri Carolini, images may be used as ecclesiastical ornaments, for purposes of instruction, and in memory of past events. It would be foolish, however, to burn incense before them and to use lights, though it would be quite wrong to cast them out of the churches and destroy them. Strong opposition is voiced in it to "adoration" of images, wrongly believing that the Council in Nicaea used this word, taken to mean the absolute adoration reserved for God alone, while only an appropriate veneration is to be given to the saints, and reverential honour to the Cross of Christ, Scripture, sacred vessels, and relics of the saints. The Greek word προσκύνησις that the Council in fact used means no more than reverence in a prostrate attitude.

== Key values ==
=== Hospitality ===
Theodulf brought fresh ideas and an open mind to the period known as the Carolingian Renaissance. He believed in always keeping the door open and never refusing pilgrims, travelers or the poor if they needed a meal or a place to stay for the night. He believed that you had to offer the less fortunate a seat at your dinner table if you one day wished to have a seat at the banquet of God. These ideas were highly influenced by his readings of Augustine. He often referred to himself as the poor traveler or stranger, being born in Spain and of Visigothic descent, and being accepted with open arms by the royal court of Charlemagne.

=== Literature and the liberal arts ===
Theodulf was an avid reader of Christian literature, and some of his favorite writers are listed in one of his letters to the Pope Leo III which include mentions of texts by Gregory the Great, St. Augustine, St. Jerome, and St. Isidore. He also mentions in his letters that he enjoyed reading pagan literature including poems by Virgil and Ovid which he thought may seem filled with heresy at first, but underneath the surface had useful morals which could be applied to Christian morality. He was also very fond of the Seven Liberal Arts and they were depicted in fresco in his dining room so that his spirit and body could be fed simultaneously.

== See also ==
- Correctory
- Codex Theodulphianus

== Bibliography ==
- Chisholm, Hugh, ed. (1911). "Theodulf" . Encyclopædia Britannica. Vol. 26 (11th ed.). Cambridge University Press.
- Löffler, Klemens (1912). "Theodulf" . In Herbermann, Charles (ed.). Catholic Encyclopedia. Vol. 14. New York: Robert Appleton Company.
- Smith, William & Wace, Henry, A Dictionary of Christian Biography, vol. 4., London, 1887, p. 985
- Monsignor Louis Baunard, Théodulfe, évêque d'Orléans et Abbé de Fleury-sur-Loire. Orléans, 1860.
- C. de Clercy, Quelques Status Diocésains de L'époque de Charlemagne. Anvers, 1930.
- A. Freeman, "Theodulf of Orleans and the Libri Carolini," Speculum Vol. 32, No. 4 (Oct., 1957), pp. 663–705.
- Ann Freeman and Paul Meyvaert (2001). "The Meaning of Theodulf's Apse Mosaic at Germigny-des-Prés". Gesta. 40 (2): 125–139. doi:10.2307/767242. JSTOR 767242. S2CID 193384276.
- A. Freeman, Theodulf of Orléans: Charlemagne's Spokesman Against the Second Council of Nicaea (Aldershot, Ashgate, 2003).
- N. Staubach, "Zwischen Mythenallegorese und Idolatriekritik. Bischof Theodulf von Orléans und die heidnischen Götter," in Christine Schmitz und Anja Bettenworth (hg.), Menschen – Heros – Gott: Weltentwürfe und Lebensmodelle im Mythos der Vormoderne (Stuttgart, Franz Steiner Verlag, 2009), 149–166.
- Garipzanov, Ildar H. (2008). The Symbolic Language of Royal Authority in the Carolingian World (c.751-877). Brill.
