= Critical edition of the Vulgate =

Critical edition of the Vulgate may refer to the following critical editions of the Vulgate text:

- Oxford Vulgate, a critical edition of the Vulgate New Testament
- Benedictine Vulgate, a critical edition of the Vulgate Old Testament, Catholic deuterocanonicals included
- Stuttgart Vulgate, a critical edition of the Vulgate Old and New Testaments

== See also ==
- Vulgate (disambiguation)
