= Scripturarum thesaurus =

Apostolic constitution

Scripturarum thesaurus Latin for 'The Treasure of the Scriptures' Apostolic constitution of Pope John Paul II
- Signature date: 25 April 1979
- Subject: promulgation of the Nova Vulgata
- Text: In Latin; In English

Scripturarum thesaurus (English: The Treasure of the Scriptures), is an apostolic constitution signed by John Paul II on 25 April 1979, the first year of the pontificate of this Pope; the document promulgates the Nova Vulgata as the official Bible of the Catholic Church.

In Scripturarum thesaurus, the Pope declares "the New Vulgate edition of the Holy Bible as 'typical'", and promulgates it "to be used especially in the sacred Liturgy but also as suitable for other things".

== Historical context ==
On 8 April 1546 with the Council of Trent, the Catholic Church had approved the 4th century Vulgate of Jerome as its official Bible. When this decree came into effect there did not exist a single authoritative copy of this text. Rather a great variety of manuscript copies (up to 10,000) and editions. Over time different authors had attempted to improve the Vulgate with no regard for Jerome's wording, while others had attempted to restore the text to a more original version, since the 13th century this task had taken a more professional shape in the form of correctories dedicated to identifying textual variants to help scribes avoid the reproduction of common errors. By 1528 these undertakings had even led to the first critical edition of the Vulgate by Robert Estienne comparing textual variants found in different correctories, which by 1540 was already in its 4th revision.

Pius V had attempted to solve the problem created by decreeing a single text to be the Church's official Bible, but not providing a copy, by appointing a commission to oversee the creation of a single authoritative Vulgate edition. His successor Gregory XIII however did not continue appointments to this commission. This led to a 44-year gap between the decree and the first authorized version of the Vulgate, the 1590 Sixtine Vulgate. This version was short lived however due to Jesuit objections to it. It was succeeded by the 1592 Sixto-Clementine Vulgate, which remained in liturgical use until this apostolic constitution was issued. The Abbey of St Jerome in Rome was founded by Pius XI to prepare the revision of the Vulgate.

== See also ==
- Vulgate
- Benedictine Vulgate
- Nova Vulgata
- Liturgiam authenticam
