= Vulgate (disambiguation) =

The Vulgate is a fourth-century translation of the Gospels and of most of the Old Testament into Latin produced by St. Jerome.

Vulgate may also refer to:

== Christianity ==
=== Official Catholic Latin editions ===
- Sixtine Vulgate, an edition of the Vulgate prepared and promulgated by Pope Sixtus V in 1590
- Sixto-Clementine Vulgate, a revision of Sixtus V's edition of the Vulgate; promulgated by Pope Clement VII in 1592
- Nova Vulgata, edition of the Vulgate promulgated in 1979 by Pope John Paul II

=== Other editions ===
- One of the critical editions of the Vulgate

=== Miscellaneous ===
- Vetus Latina, Latin translation of the Septuagint pre-dating the fourth-century translation of St. Jerome
- Greek Vulgate, an expression with various meanings

== Literature ==
=== Antiquity ===
- Vulgate, in Homeric scholarship, the precedent texts to the current versions of the Iliad and the Odyssey
- Vulgate, accounts of the life and times of Alexander the Great based on the Cleitarchus' lost History of Alexander; parts of it are found in:
  - Quintus Curtius Rufus' "Histories of Alexander the Great"
  - Plutarch, "Life of Alexander"
  - Diodorus Siculus, Book 17
  - Gnaeus Pompeius Trogus, "Philippic History", Books 11-12
  - Justin (historian), Historia Philippicae et Totius Mundi Origines et Terrae Situs, Books 11-12

=== Arthurian legend ===
- Vulgate Cycle, also known as the Lancelot-Grail, a major source of Arthurian legend written in French
- Post-Vulgate Cycle, a rewriting of the Lancelot-Grail

== See also ==
- Book of Kells
- Textus Receptus
