= Roman edition of the Vulgate =

May refer to:

- Sixtine Vulgate, first published in 1590
- Sixto-Clementine Vulgate, first published in 1592
- Benedictine Vulgate, also called Roman Vulgate, published between 1926 and 1995
- Nova Vulgata, first published in 1979
