= Bible of Navarra =

Bible version

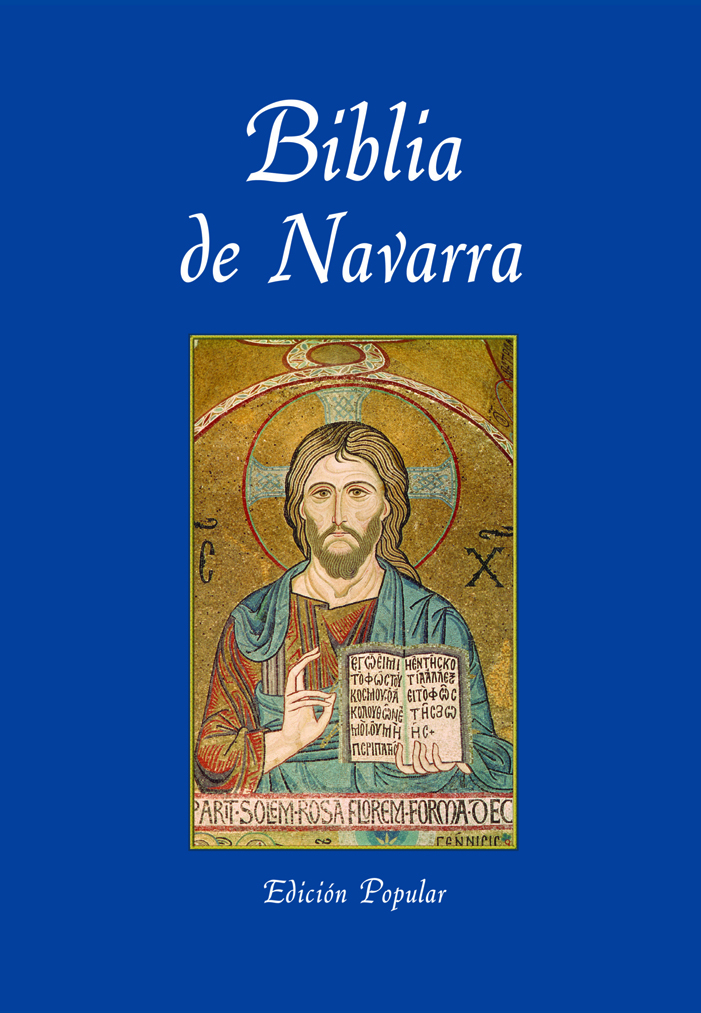
Cover of the Biblia de Navarra

The Sagrada Biblia (Holy Bible), known as Biblia de Navarra, is a translation of and commentary on the Catholic version of the Bible made by professors of the Faculty of Theology of the University of Navarra.

== History ==
This new translation and its accompanying commentary was commissioned by Josemaría Escrivá de Balaguer, founder of the Opus Dei, who was also first Great Chancellor of the University of Navarra. The faculty at the University of Navarra first created a New Testament translation into Spanish that was released in 1983, with Old Testament translations being published in separate volumes as they were completed, first in Spanish and then into additional languages, including English. The complete new Bible translation was completed in 2004. It's published by Ediciones Universidad de Navarra (EUNSA).

== Characteristics of the work ==
In the first iteration, the biblical text is written in Latin and Spanish. The text in Spanish was done from the original texts in the Hebrew and Greek languages. The text in Latin is the same of the Nova Vulgata, an updated version of the Bible in Latin published in 1979 by the Holy See. The margins of the text in Spanish have references to other biblical passages. In the explicative notes, located in middle of the Latin and Castilian texts, usually cite comments of the Fathers of the Church, of others catholic authors and the Magisterium of the Church.

== Editions ==
The Bible of Navarra has had the following editions:

- Holy Bible (5 volumes)
- New Testament (pocket edition)
- New Testament (12 volumes)

There are editions of the Bible of Navarra in French, English, Italian and Portuguese, for which the comments and introductions have been translated, making use the biblical text de from already existing versions in these languages. Since 2016, there has been a digital edition.

There is also a free digital edition that contains only the four gospels.
