= Martyrology of Usuard =

9th-century martyrology

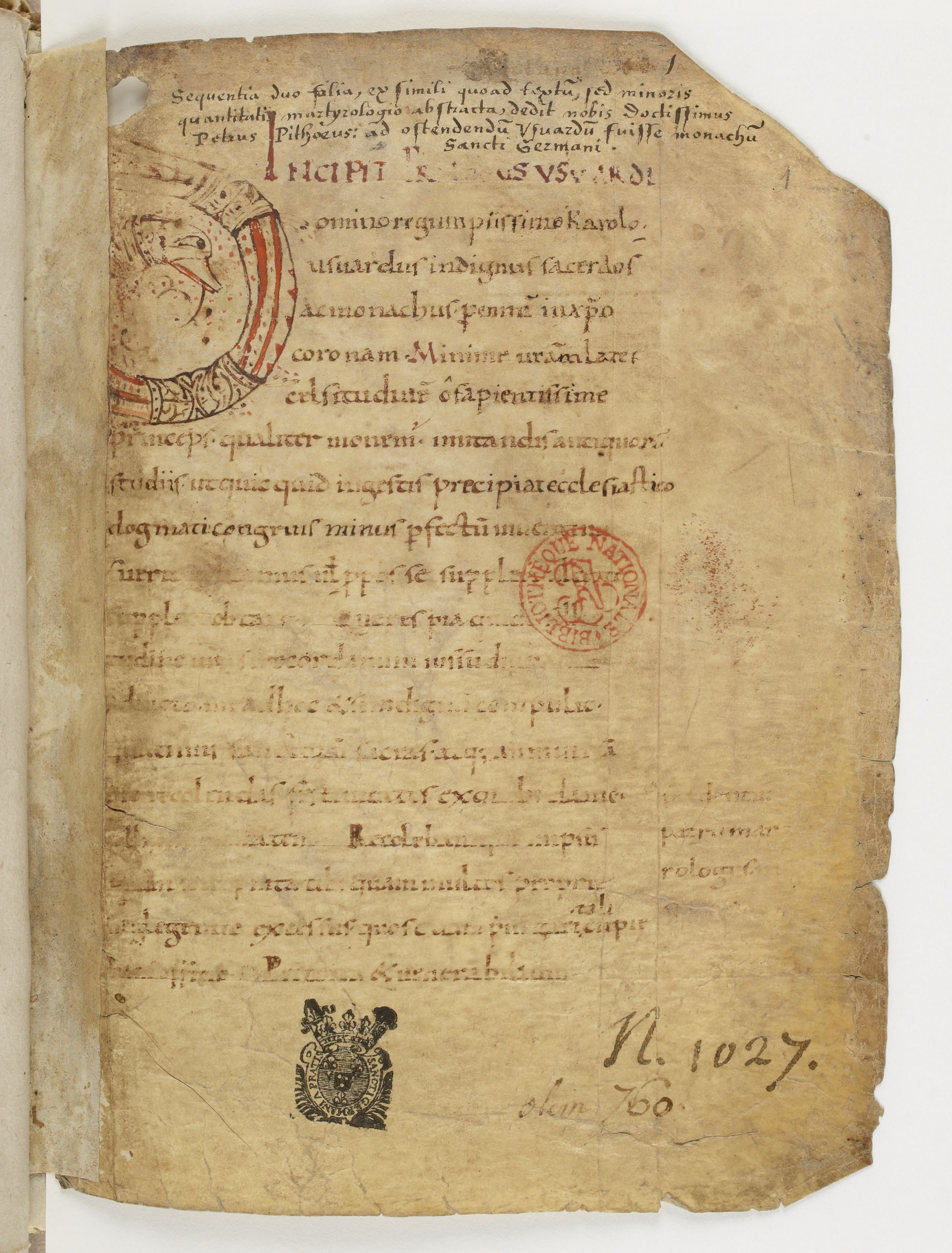
Beginning of the Martyrology

The Martyrology of Usuard is a work by Usuard, a monk of the Benedictine abbey of Saint-Germain-des-Prés. The prologue is dedicated to Charles the Bald indicating that it was undertaken at that monarch's instigation. It was apparently written shortly before the author's death in 875. The martyrology enjoyed consistent success throughout the Middle Ages, as evidenced by numerous surviving manuscripts. This martyrology synthesizes elements of the old Martyrologium Hieronymianum, the martyrology of Ado of Vienne, and an enhanced version of that of Bede, attributed to the archdeacon Florus of Lyon. It contains eleven hundred saints' lives. The martyrology is a compilation upon which the later Roman Martyrology depended closely until the twentieth century; it remained throughout the Middle Ages the most famous document of its kind. It is preserved to us in innumerable manuscripts, of which Henri Quentin gives a partial list (Martyrologes historiques, 1908, pp. 675–7).

The full story of the relation of the texts was unravelled for the first time by Quentin, and the evolution of the early medieval martyrologia culminating in Usuard's work was told by Quentin in the book just cited. Usuard provided what was substantially an abridgement of Ado's Martyrology in a form better adapted for practical liturgical use. In certain points, however, Usuard reverted to a Lyonese recension of Bede's augmented Martyrology, which was attributed to the archdeacon Florus of Lyon.

The text of Usuard's Martyrologium was edited by Jacques Bouillart (Paris, 1718) from manuscript Latini 13745 at Paris, which, if not the autograph of the author, dates at any rate from his time. A still more elaborate edition was brought out by the Bollandist Father Jean-Baptiste Du Sollier.

In the thirteenth century the Dominican Order adopted Usuard's as the basis for their own martyrology.

== Usuard ==
Usuard (died 23 January 875) was a Benedictine monk at the Abbey of Saint-Germain-des-Prés and a Carolingian scholar.

His name appears in a list of monks of Saint-Germain-des-Prés written around 841/847 (a declaration of spiritual association with the monks of the Abbey of Saint-Remi). In 858, he went to Spain with his colleague Odilard monk to collect relics; they returned with those martyrs George, Aurelius and Nathalie, Christians executed in Córdoba, Andalusia on 27 July 852. The account of this voyage, accompanied by miracles, was told by their colleague Aimoin.

Usuard also composed an obituary of the abbey of Saint-Germain-des-Prés, the oldest of its kind (edited by Auguste Molinier, The French obituaries in the Middle Ages, 1890).

== Sources ==
- Martyrology of Usuard
- Henri Quentin, Les martyrologes historiques du Moyen Âge, Paris, 1908.
- Dubois, Jean (1957). "Un témoin de la vie intellectuelle à Saint-Germain-des-Prés au IXe siècle: Le martyrologe d'Usuard". Revue d'histoire de l'Église de France. 43 (140): 35–48. doi:10.3406/rhef.1957.3214. ISSN 0300-9505.
- Overgaauw, E.A. (1988–1989). "Les deux recensions de la lettre-préface d'Usuard à Charles le Chauve et les trois recensions de son martyrologe". ALMA, Bulletin du Cange. 48–49: 85–101. doi:10.3406/alma.1988.1618. hdl:2042/3414.
