= Pontifical Institute of Sacred Music =

Coordinates: 41.89364°N 12.42941°E

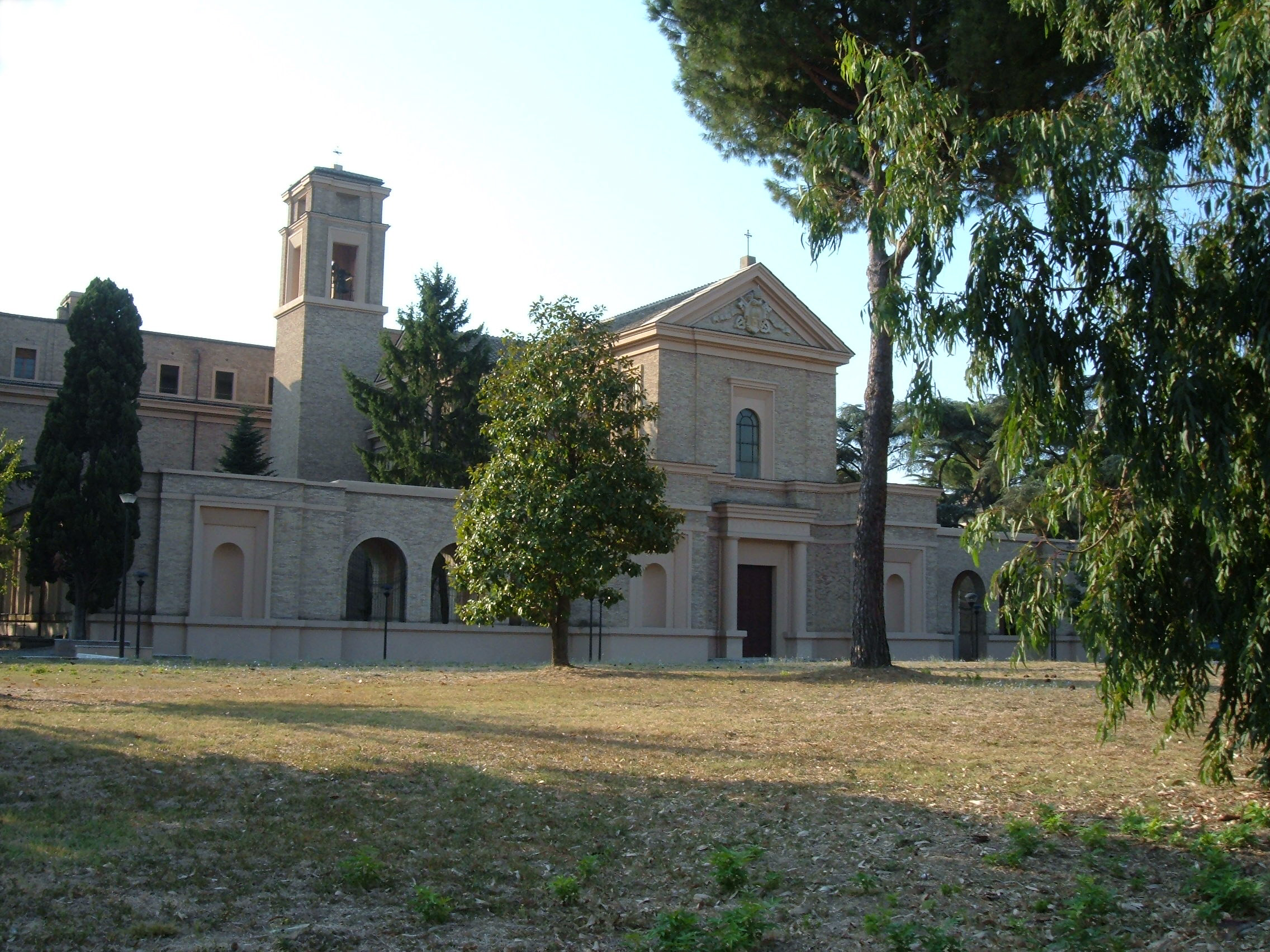
Site of the institute

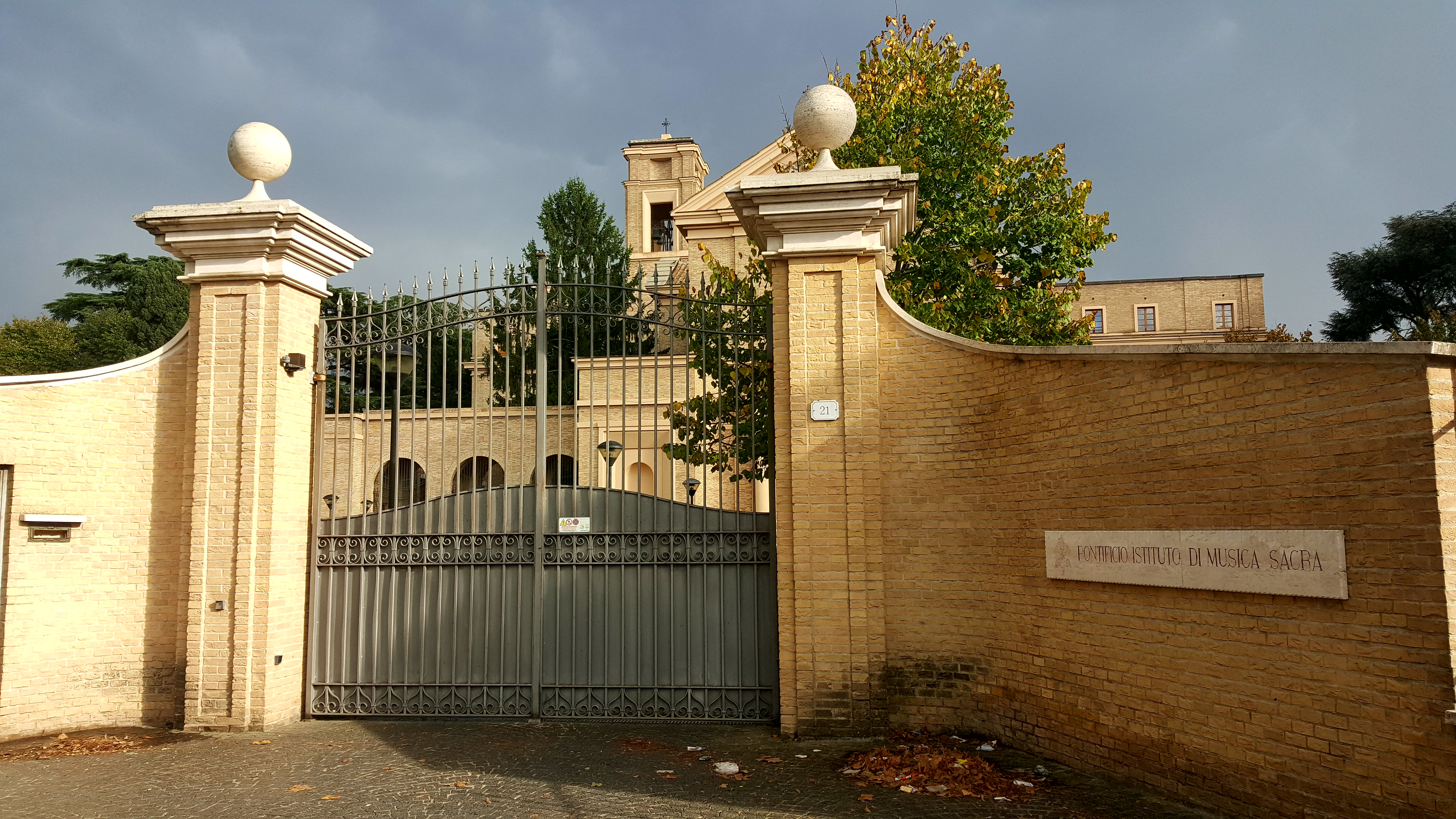
Front gate of the Pontifical Institute of Sacred Music

The Pontifical Institute of Sacred Music (Italian: Pontificio istituto di musica sacra; Latin: Pontificium institutum musicae sacrae) is an institution of higher education of the Roman Catholic Church specifically dedicated to the study of church music. It is based in Rome, Italy, located in the former Pontifical Abbey of St Jerome-in-the-City. Its preside (president) is Dominican priest Robert Mehlhart OP, an expert in Gregorian chant.

== History ==
Pope Pius X established the Institute in 1910 as the "School of Sacred Music". He intended it as a body dedicated to teaching and performing "sacred music". The school opened in 1911. In July 1914, Pope Pius X declared it a Pontifical Institute and granted the power to confer academic degrees. On 23 September 1914, newly elected Pope Benedict XV referred to the institute as part of the legacy left to him by his predecessor, saying he would support and promote it in the best way possible. The following month, he assigned the Palazzo di Sant'Apollinare as its residence, relocating it from via del Mascherone. The next pontiff, Pope Pius XI, confirmed a connection between the institute and the Apostolic See in Motu proprio, Ad musicae sacrae (22 November 1922).

With the apostolic constitution Deus scientiarum Dominus of 1931, the institute took its present name and was included among the pontifical academic institutes. In 1983, it moved to the former Pontifical Abbey of St Jerome-in-the-City. In 2001, Pope John Paul II celebrated its 90th anniversary, honoring its previous president, Bishop Higini Angles, who was president from 1947 to 1969.

For several years in the first two decades of the 21st century, the administrator of the Pontifical Institute was the Spanish priest Alfonso Luna Sánchez, who died in Rome on 3 April 2020 at the residence of the De La Salle Brothers. The goals of the Pontifical Institute of Sacred Music are to teach music in practical, theoretical, and historical terms, to promote the spread of traditional sacred music and encourage artistic expressions of music in the current day, and to render services of music to the Catholic churches throughout the world.

== Courses offered ==
The Institute grants the following degrees in sacred music: Bachelor (3 years), Licentiate (2 years) and a Doctorate. The degrees are offered with one of the following foci: Gregorian chant, composition, choral direction, musicology, pipe organ and pianoforte. Instruction in Italian is offered in harmony, counterpoint, fugue, composition, acoustics, music history and analysis, musicology, bibliography, research methods, ethno-musicology, editing of music, notation, Gregorian chant, liturgics, piano, pipe organ, score reading, continuo (figured bass), keyboard improvisation, choral conducting and Latin.

== See also ==
- Pontifical universities in Rome
