= John Anderson (classicist) =

British classical scholar

John George Clark Anderson (6 December 1870 – 31 March 1952) was a classical scholar, who was Camden Professor of Ancient History at the University of Oxford from 1927 to 1936.

== Personal life and career ==
J. G. C. Anderson, the son of a Scottish clergyman, was born on 6 December 1870, and was educated at Aberdeen University and Christ Church, Oxford. He was a fellow of Lincoln College, Oxford, from 1897 to 1900, during which time he carried out archaeological explorations in Asia Minor. He returned to Christ Church on his appointment as a senior student (the equivalent at Christ Church of fellows at other colleges) in 1900, and won the university's Conington Prize in 1903. He served successively as University Lecturer, then Reader, in Roman Epigraphy between 1919 and 1927, when (in the same year as his appointment as Reader) he became Camden Professor of Ancient History. The chair was attached to Brasenose College, Oxford, where he became a fellow. He stepped down from the professorship and the fellowship in 1936, and died on 31 March 1952.

In late 1931, Anderson opposed the appointment of Albert Einstein as a student (fellow) at Christ Church on nationalistic and xenophobic grounds, protesting to Henry Julian White, the dean of Christ Church, that "Oxford emoluments were never meant to be used for the benefit of foreigners, however eminent" and that it was unpatriotic to "subsidize a German" during the Great Depression.

== Works ==
- Asia Minor (London: John Murray, 1903)
