= Jerome's first epistle to Paulinus =

Letter number 53 of Jerome, addressed to bishop Paulinus of Nola

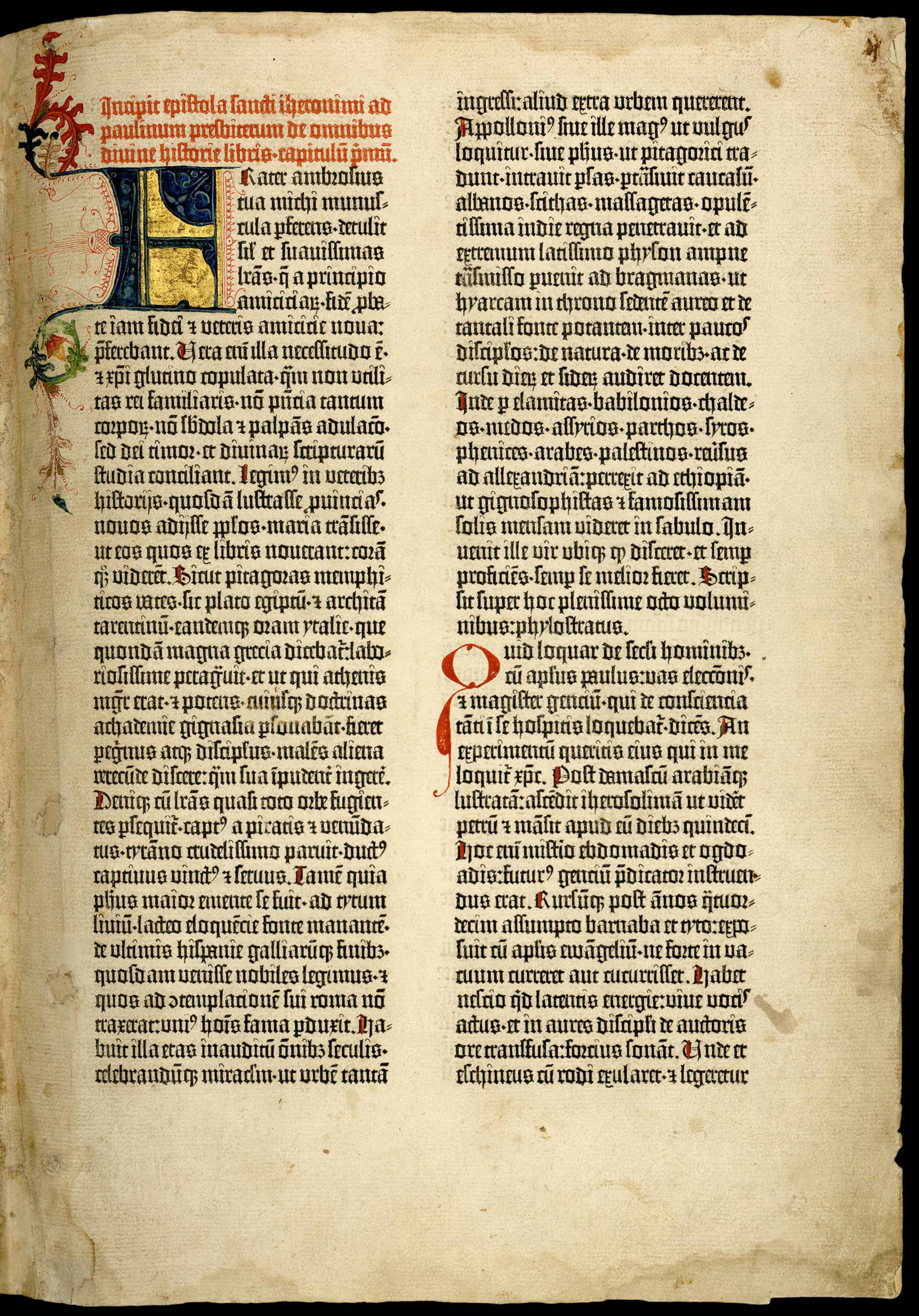
The epistle in the Ransom Center copy of the Gutenberg Bible; there are two columns of text on the page surrounded by a hand-painted border made up of green foliage, colourful flowers and various birds. The first three lines of the first column have been added by hand in red. After the headlines, the first capital letter of the main text starts with a large green and brown hand painted 'F' which forms part of the border. A hand painted rubric letter 'Q' has been included halfway down the second column. Capital letters throughout the text have been highlighted in red and yellow.

Jerome's first epistle to Paulinus is a letter written by Jerome, addressed to Paulinus of Nola, which was used as the preface for the Gutenberg Bible. This Bible was published by Johannes Gutenberg and Johann Fust in Mainz, Germany in 1454. The Gutenberg Bible is an edition of a 4th-century Latin translation of the Bible known as the Vulgate or common text. It is cited as Letter 53. Jerome wrote two further letters to Paulinus.

== Content and date of the epistle ==
In this letter, Jerome urges Paulinus, bishop of Nola, "to make a diligent study of the Scriptures and to this end reminds him of the zeal for learning displayed not only by the wisest of the pagans but also by the apostle Paul. Then going through the two Testaments in detail he describes the contents of the several books and the lessons which may be learned from them. He concludes with an appeal to Paulinus to divest himself wholly of his earthly wealth and to devote himself altogether to God."

This epistle was written in 394 A.D.

== In the Gutenberg Vulgate ==
=== Creation ===
The Gutenberg Bible was created using a pioneering invention that allowed sheets of paper to be printed in large quantities resulting in the same quality as manuscripts.
