= Bonifatius Fischer =

Bonifatius Fischer (1915 – 1997) was a German biblical scholar, textual critic of the Vulgate, and Benedictine.

Fischer questioned Jerome's authorship of some parts of the Vulgate New Testament.

From 1951 to 1954 Fischer prepared the Old-Latin text of the Book of Genesis:

- Genesis 1:1 – 9:14 (1951)
- Genesis 9:14 – 27:23 (1952)
- Genesis 27:23 – 43:22 (1953)
- Genesis 43:22 – 50:26 (1954).

Fischer examined all known Latin manuscripts of the Gospels written before the 10th century. Fischer participated in preparation of Vulgata Stuttgartiana.

== Works ==
- Novae Concordantiae Bibliorum Sacrorum Iuxta Vulgatam Versionem Critice Editam, 1977, ISBN 3-7728-0638-4
- Beiträge Zur Geschichte Der Lateinischen Bibeltexte
- Lateinische Bibelhandschriften Im Frühen Mittelalter
