= Stuttgart Vulgate =

Manual critical edition of the Vulgate

Biblia Sacra iuxta vulgatam versionem
- 5th edition
- Editors: Robert Weber; later Roger Gryson
- Published: 1969; 2nd ed. in 1975; 3rd ed. in 1983; 4th ed. in 1994; 5th ed. in 2007
- Website: The Biblia Sacra Vulgata and its history

The Stuttgart Vulgate or Weber-Gryson Vulgate (full title: Biblia Sacra iuxta vulgatam versionem) is a critical edition of the Vulgate first published in 1969.

The most recent edition of the work is the fifth edition, from 2007.

== History ==
Based on the edition of Oxford and the edition of Rome of the Vulgate, but with independent examination of manuscript evidence, the Württembergische Bibelanstalt, later the Deutsche Bibelgesellschaft (German Bible Society), based in Stuttgart, first published a critical edition of the complete Vulgate in 1969. The work has since continued to be updated, with a fifth edition appearing in 2007. The project was originally directed by Robert Weber, OSB (a monk of the same Benedictine abbey responsible for the Rome edition), with collaborators Bonifatius Fischer, Jean Gribomont, Hedley Frederick Davis Sparks (also responsible for the completion of the Oxford edition), and Walter Thiele. Roger Gryson has been responsible for the most recent editions. It is thus marketed by its publisher as the "Weber-Gryson" edition, but is also frequently referred to as the Stuttgart edition.

== Characteristics ==
The Stuttgart Vulgate is based on the Oxford Vulgate and the Benedictine Vulgate.

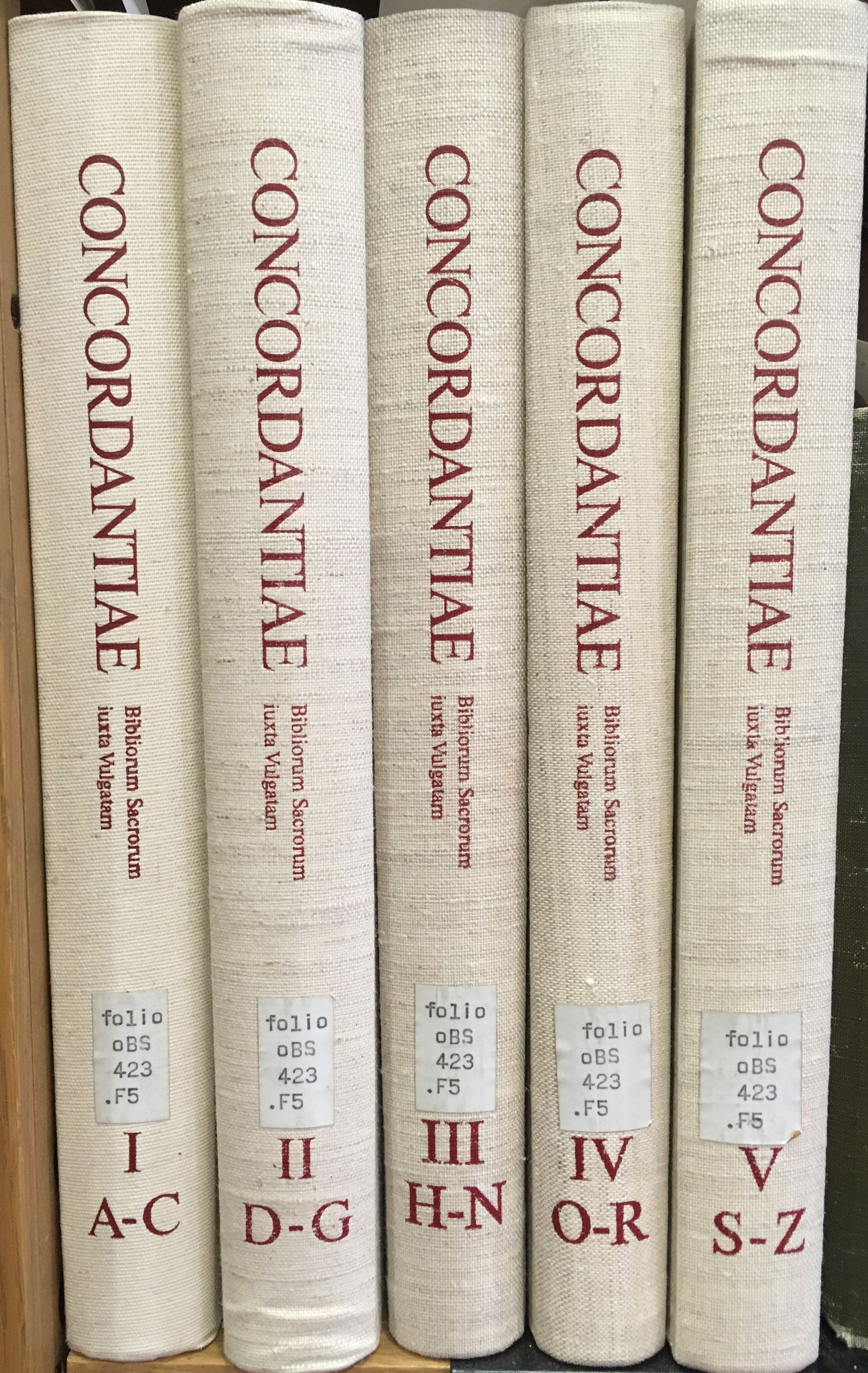
Concordance to the Vulgate Bible for the Stuttgart Vulgate

The Weber-Gryson edition includes Jerome's prologues and the Eusebian Canons. It does not, however, provide any of the other prefatory material often found in medieval Bible manuscripts, such as chapter headings, some of which are included in the large editions of Oxford and Rome.

In its spelling, it retains medieval Latin orthography, sometimes using oe rather than ae, and having more proper nouns beginning with H (e.g., Helimelech instead of Elimelech). It also uses line breaks, rather than the modern system of punctuation marks, to indicate the structure of each verse, following the practice of the Oxford and Rome editions.

It contains two Latin Psalters, both the traditional Gallicanum and the juxta Hebraicum, which are printed on facing pages to allow easy comparison and contrast between the two versions. It has an expanded Apocrypha, containing Psalm 151 and the Epistle to the Laodiceans in addition to 3 and 4 Esdras and the Prayer of Manasseh. In addition, its modern prefaces (in Latin, German, French, and English) are a source of information about the history of the Vulgate.

== Sigla ==
The following sigla are used in the Stuttgart Vulgate to designate previous editions of texts of the Vulgate:

Edition sigla of the Stuttgart Vulgate
Sigla	Dates	Contents	Editor	Location
𝔟	1951–1954	Genesis	Bonifatius Fischer	Freiburg
𝔟	1977–1985	Wisdom; Cath	Walter Thiele	Freiburg
𝔟	1962–1991	Paul; Hebrews	Hermann Josef Frede	Freiburg
𝔟	1895	4 Esdras	Robert Lubbock Bensly	Cambridge
𝔠	1592–1598	Bible (Clementine Vulgate)	Pope Clement VIII	Rome
𝔡	1932	Maccabees	Donatien de Bruyne	Maredsous
𝔥	1922	Psalms	John M. Harden	London
𝔥	1931	Laodiceans	Adolf von Harnack	Berlin
𝔯	1926–1995	Old Testament (Benedictine Vulgate)	Benedictines of Jerome	Rome
𝔰	1954	Psalms	Henri de Sainte-Marie	Rome
𝔬	1889–1954	New Testament (Oxford Vulgate)	Wordsworth & White	Oxford
𝔳	1910	4 Esdras (DGCS, 18th vol.)	Bruno Violet	Leipzig
𝔴	1911	1 Cor–Eph	Henry Julian White	Oxford

== Miscellaneous ==
This edition's early popularity can in part be attributed to a 1977 concordance based on the second edition of the book by Bonifatius Fischer (Novae concordantiae Biblorum Sacrorum iuxta vulgatam versionem critice editam), which was a key reference tool before the availability of personal computers.

A translation of the text of the Stuttgart Vulgate into German was completed in 2018.

== See also ==
- Oxford Vulgate
- Benedictine Vulgate
- Biblia Hebraica (Kittel)
- Novum Testamentum Graece
