= Jacques Bouillart =

Jacques Bouillart (1669 – 11 December 1726) was a Benedictine monk of the Congregation of St.-Maur.

Bouillart was born in the Diocese of Chartres. He professed at the Monastery of St. Faron de Meaux in 1687. He was the author of Histoire de l'abbaye royale de Saint-Germain-des-Prés (Paris, 1724). This history of the Benedictine monastery contains biographies of the abbots that ruled over it, since its foundation by Childeric I in 543, along with historical events related to the abbey. It also contains many illustrations and detailed descriptions of architecture, art and historical documents. Bouillart also edited a martyrology of Usuard. In this publication he attempted to establish the genuineness and authenticity of the manuscript preserved at Saint-Germain-des-Prés, against Jean Baptiste du Sollier, a Jesuit hagiographer, who in his revised edition of Usuard's martyrology had paid no attention to this manuscript.
