= Henry Julian White =

English biblical scholar

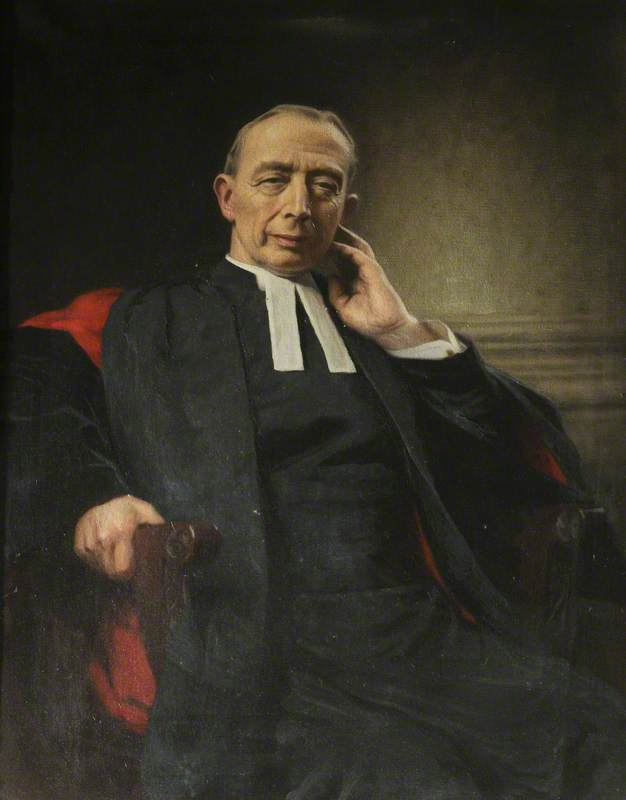
Julian White

Henry Julian White (27 August 1859 – 16 July 1934) was an English biblical scholar.

White was born in Islington, north London, the second son of Henry John White. He was educated at Christ Church, Oxford, matriculating on 11 October 1878, graduating B.A. in 1882 (M.A. 1885). He was ordained in 1886, becoming the domestic chaplain of John Wordsworth in the same year. He was Chaplain and a Fellow of Merton College, Oxford, where he taught theology, from 1895 to 1905; and a Fellow of King's College London from 1905 to 1920. He assisted Wordsworth in producing an edition of the Vulgate Bible. He was also co-author of A Grammar of the Vulgate. He was Dean of Christ Church in Oxford from 1920 to 1934.

White supported the appointment of Albert Einstein as a student (fellow) at Christ Church in 1931, facing protests from classical scholar J. G. C. Anderson on nationalistic and xenophobic grounds.
