= Oxford Vulgate =

Critical edition of the Vulgate New Testament

Nouum Testamentum Domini nostri Jesu Christi latine, secundum editionem Sancti Hieronymi
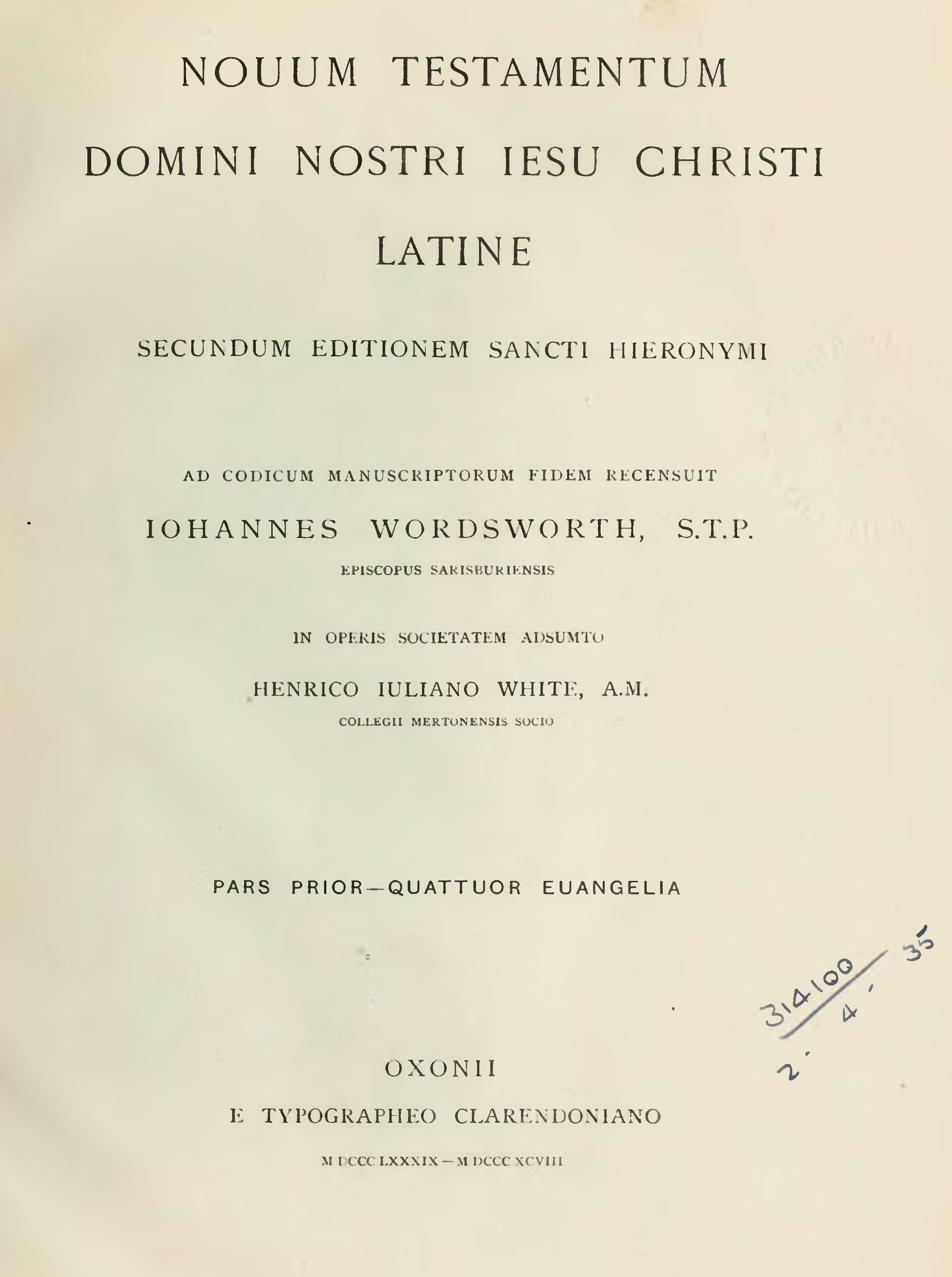
- Title page of the first volume (1889)
- Language: Latin
- Published: 1889–1954

The Oxford Vulgate (full title: Nouum Testamentum Domini nostri Jesu Christi latine, secundum editionem Sancti Hieronymi, tr.: Latin New Testament of our Lord Jesus Christ, according to the edition of Saint Jerome) is a critical edition of the Vulgate version of the New Testament produced by scholars of the University of Oxford, and published progressively between 1889 and 1954 in 3 volumes.

== History ==
As a result of the inaccuracy of existing editions of the Vulgate, the delegates of Oxford University Press accepted in 1878 a proposal from classicist John Wordsworth to produce a critical edition of the New Testament. This was eventually published as Nouum Testamentum Domini nostri Iesu Christi Latine, secundum editionem sancti Hieronymi in three volumes between 1889 and 1954. Along with Wordsworth and Henry Julian White, the completed work lists on its title pages Alexander Ramsbotham.

As preliminary work to the full edition, Wordsworth published the text of certain important manuscripts in the series Old-Latin Biblical Texts, with the help of William Sanday, H. J. White (professor of New Testament studies at King's College, London), and other scholars. Wordsworth was consecrated Bishop of Salisbury in 1885, and White (who became Dean of Christ Church, Oxford in 1920) assumed co-editorship of the edition, which was published in fascicles beginning with the Gospel of Matthew in 1889; the first volume, with an extensive epilogue discussing the history of the manuscripts and the text, was completed in 1898.

Acts, forming the beginning of the third volume, was published in 1905. In 1911, Wordsworth and White produced a smaller editio minor with the complete text of the New Testament and a limited apparatus, but using modern punctuation.

Wordsworth died in 1911. Even with the death of some of those involved in the project during the First World War, the second volume (containing the Pauline epistles) had been published as far as the Second Epistle to the Corinthians by 1926. In 1933, White enlisted Sparks to assist him in the work, who after White's death in 1934 assumed primary responsibility for the edition. After its completion, he served on the editorial board for the Stuttgart edition of the Vulgate, beginning in 1959.

== Manuscripts used ==
The edition, commonly known as Oxford Vulgate, relies primarily on the texts of the Codex Amiatinus, Codex Fuldensis (Codex Harleianus in the Gospels), Codex Sangermanensis and Codex Mediolanensis; but also consistently cites readings in the so-called DELQR group of manuscripts, named after the sigla it uses for them: Book of Armagh (D), Egerton Gospels (E), Lichfield Gospels (L), Book of Kells (Q), and Rushworth Gospels (R).

== See also ==
- Stuttgart Vulgate
- Benedictine Vulgate
- Oxford Hebrew Bible
