= Nova Vulgata =

Ecclesiastical Latin translation of the Bible

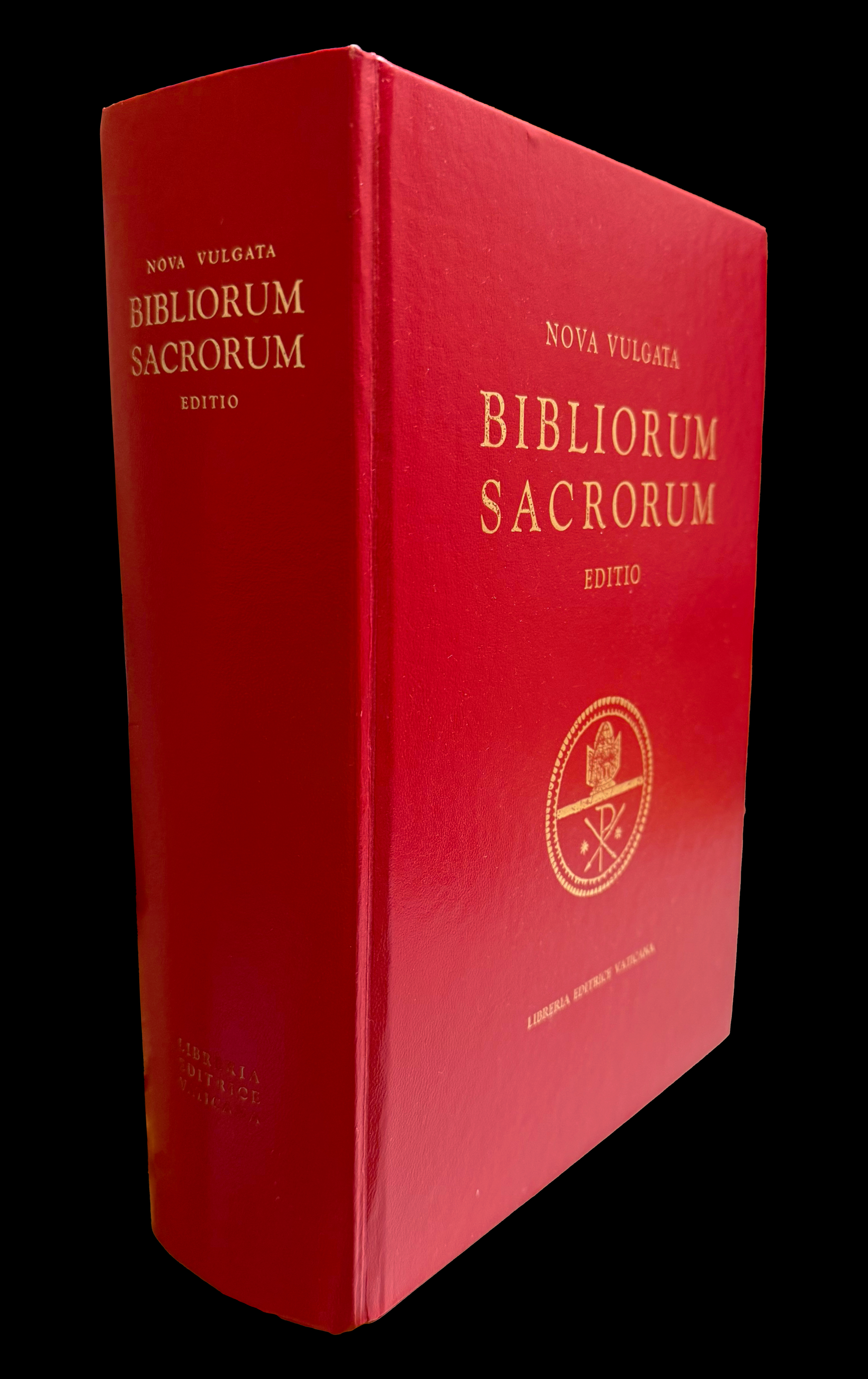
- Nova Vulgata 1986 edition
- Other names: Neo-Vulgate, New Latin Vulgate, New Vulgate
- Language: Latin
- Complete Bible published: 1979 (2nd revised edition in 1986)
- Textual basis: Vulgate
- Religious affiliation: Catholic Church
- Website: Nova Vulgata- Bibliorum Sacrorum Editio (vatican.va)
- Genesis 1:1–3 In principio creavit Deus caelum et terram. Terra autem erat inanis et vacua, et tenebrae super faciem abyssi, et spiritus Dei ferebatur super aquas. Dixitque Deus: “Fiat lux”. Et facta est lux. John 3:16 Sic enim dilexit Deus mundum, ut Filium suum unigenitum daret, ut omnis, qui credit in eum, non pereat, sed habeat vitam aeternam.

The Nova Vulgata (complete title: Nova Vulgata Bibliorum Sacrorum Editio, transl. The New Vulgate Edition of the Holy Bible; abr. NV), also called the Neo-Vulgate, is the Catholic Church's official Latin translation of the original-language texts of the Catholic canon of the Bible published by the Holy See. It was completed in 1979, and was promulgated the same year by John Paul II in Scripturarum thesaurus. A second, revised edition was published in 1986. It is the official Latin text of the Bible of the Catholic Church. The Nova Vulgata is also called the New Latin Vulgate or the New Vulgate.

Before the Nova Vulgata, the Clementine Vulgate was the standard Bible of the Catholic Church. The Clementine version continues to be employed in liturgical celebrations using the pre–Vatican II liturgical books, including the 1961 Roman Breviary.

== History ==
=== Elaboration of the text ===
The Second Vatican Council in Sacrosanctum Concilium mandated a revision of the Latin Psalter, to bring it in line with modern textual and linguistic studies while preserving its Christian Latin style. In 1965, Pope Paul VI appointed a commission to revise the rest of the Vulgate following the same principles. The Commission published its work in eight annotated sections and invited criticism from Catholic scholars as the sections were published. The Latin Psalter was published in 1969, the New Testament was completed by 1971, and the entire Nova Vulgata was published as a single-volume edition for the first time in 1979.

The foundational text of most of the Old Testament is the critical edition commissioned by Pope Pius X and produced by the monks of the Benedictine Abbey of St. Jerome. The foundational text of the Books of Tobit and Judith is from manuscripts of the Vetus Latina, rather than the Vulgate. The New Testament was based on the 1969 edition of the Stuttgart Vulgate, and hence on the Oxford Vulgate. All of these base texts were revised to accord with the modern critical editions in Greek, Hebrew, and Aramaic. A number of changes were also made where modern scholars felt that Jerome had failed to grasp the meaning of the original languages, or had rendered it obscurely.

== First publication ==
The NV was first published in different fascicles between 1969 and 1977.

== Promulgation and publication ==
After this lengthy preparation, the Nova Vulgata was published and declared the official Latin version of the Bible of the Catholic Church by means of the apostolic constitution Scripturarum thesaurus, promulgated by Pope John Paul II on April 25, 1979. The NV was published the same year.

A second edition, published in 1986, added a Preface to the reader, an Introduction to the principles used in producing the Nova Vulgata, and an appendix containing three historical documents from the Council of Trent and the Clementine Vulgate.

== Liturgiam authenticam ==
In 2001, the Congregation for Divine Worship and the Discipline of the Sacraments released the instruction Liturgiam authenticam. This text stated the Nova Vulgata was "the point of reference as regards the delineation of the canonical text". Concerning the translation of liturgical texts, the instruction states:

Furthermore, in the preparation of these translations for liturgical use, the Nova Vulgata Editio, promulgated by the Apostolic See, is normally to be consulted as an auxiliary tool, in a manner described elsewhere in this Instruction, in order to maintain the tradition of interpretation that is proper to the Latin Liturgy. [...] [I]t is advantageous to be guided by the Nova Vulgata wherever there is a need to choose, from among various possibilities [of translation], that one which is most suited for expressing the manner in which a text has traditionally been read and received within the Latin liturgical tradition.

This recommendation is qualified, however: the instruction specifies that translations should not be made from the Nova Vulgata only, but rather "must be made directly from the original texts, namely the Latin, as regards the texts of ecclesiastical composition, or the Hebrew, Aramaic, or Greek, as the case may be, as regards the texts of Sacred Scripture". The instruction does not recommend translation of the Bible, or of the liturgy, based solely upon the Latin Nova Vulgata; the NV must instead simply be used as an "auxiliary tool".

When translating the Tetragrammaton, Liturgiam authenticam says that "[i]n accordance with immemorial tradition, which indeed is already evident in the above-mentioned Septuagint version, the name of almighty God expressed by the Hebrew tetragrammaton and rendered in Latin by the word Dominus, is to be rendered into any given vernacular by a word equivalent in meaning."

== Textual characteristics ==
Most of the approximately 2,000 changes made by the Nova Vulgata to the Stuttgart Vulgate text of Jerome's version of the Gospels are minor and stylistic in nature.

In addition, in the New Testament the Nova Vulgata introduced corrections to align the Latin with the Greek text in order to represent Jerome's text, as well as its Greek base, accurately. This alignment had not been achieved earlier, either in the edition of 1590 or in the 1592 edition of the Vulgate.

The NV contains only the Biblical canon of the Catholic Church, and not other pseudepigraphical books "often associated with the Vulgate tradition".

== Use of the Nova Vulgata ==
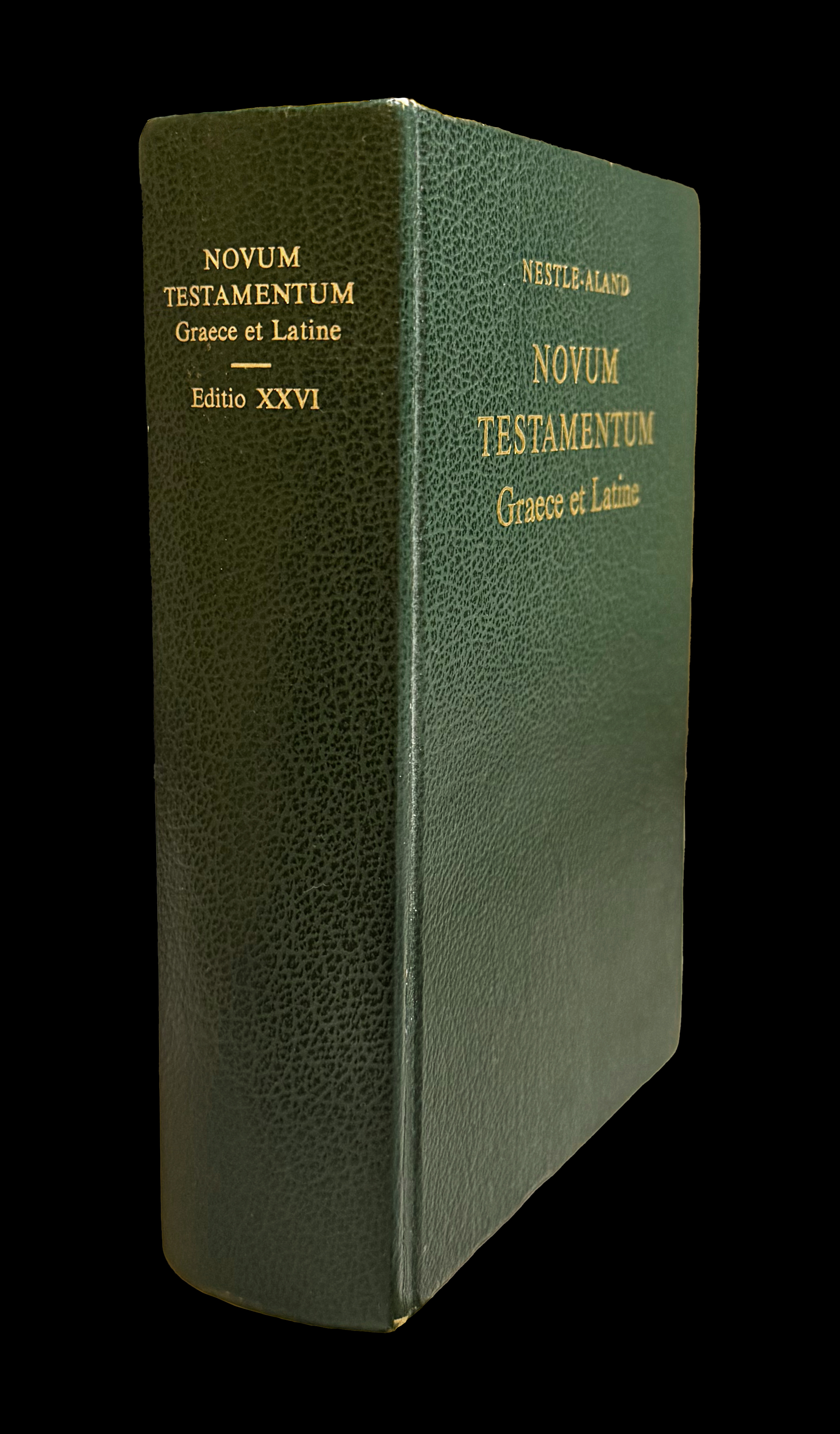
Novum Testamentum Graece et Latine

William Griffin used the Nova Vulgata for his Latin-to-English translation of the Books of Tobit, Judith, 1 and 2 Maccabees, Baruch, Wisdom, Sirach, and the additions to Esther and to Daniel for the Catholic/Ecumenical Edition of The Message Bible.

The Nova Vulgata provides the Latin text of Kurt and Barbara Aland's bilingual Novum Testamentum Graece et Latine; the latter was first released in 1984. Also, since the Alands' 1984 revision of the Novum Testamentum Latine, the Novum Testamentum Latine has also used the Nova Vulgata as its reference text.

== See also ==
- Benedictine Vulgate
- Douay–Rheims Bible
- Divino afflante Spiritu
