= Pontifical Abbey of St Jerome-in-the-City =

Benedictine former abbey in Rome

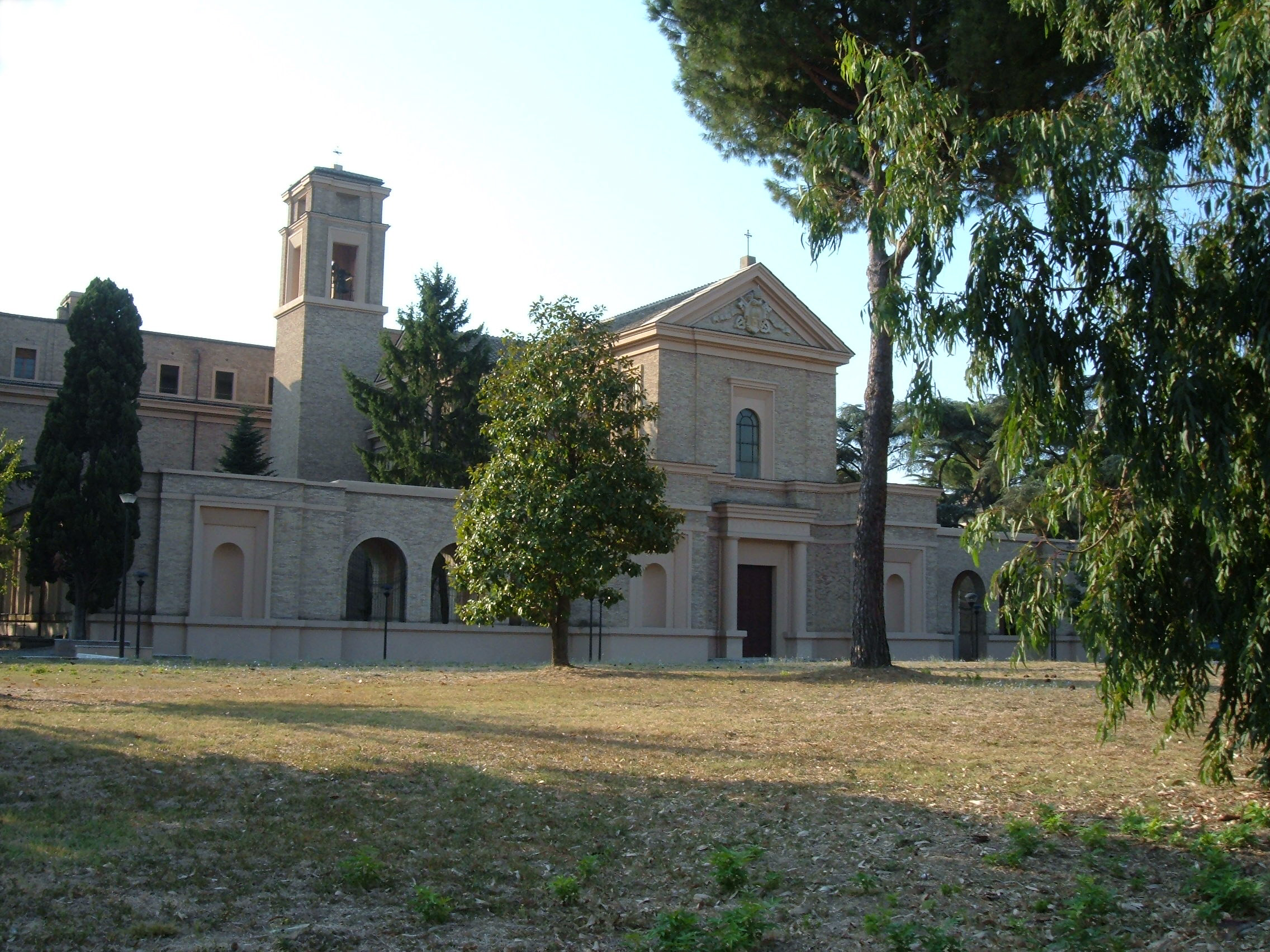
Church of Santa Maria della Visitazione, part of the former Pontifical Abbey of St Jerome-in-the-City

The Pontifical Abbey of St Jerome-in-the-City (Latin: Abbatia pontificia sancti Hieronymi in urbe; Italian: San Girolamo in urbe) was a Benedictine monastery in Rome founded in 1933 for the purpose of creating a critical edition of the Vulgate. The abbey was dissolved in 1984; their critical edition of the Vulgate is only that of the Old Testament, Catholic deuterocanonicals included, and is known as the Benedictine Vulgate.

== History ==
In 1907, the Vatican announced that the Benedictines had been assigned the task of creating a corrected edition of the Vulgate. In addition to the critical edition of the Vulgate, a series called Collectanea Biblica Latina was created to publish subsidiary findings from research on the Latin Bible. A motu proprio of 1914, Consilium a Decessore, established a pontifical commission to oversee this work, which in 1926 was credited on the title page of the first published volume of the resulting edition, Biblia Sacra iuxta latinam vulgatam versionem ad codicum fidem. The project was originally based at the Pontifical Atheneum of St. Anselm, and later the Palazzo San Callisto. On 15 June 1933, an apostolic constitution, Inter praecipuas, established an abbey to complete the work; a further motu proprio was issued in 1934 to clarify its status. Its community was largely drawn from Clervaux Abbey; its first abbot was Henri Quentin.

The methodology of the edition which was the main focus of the abbey proved to be controversial among scholars, but it was nonetheless a great improvement over any materials previously available. In 1959, the abbey completed a critical edition of the Sixto-Clementine Vulgate. In 1969, while individual volumes of the large edition had only been published up to Isaiah, Robert Weber, OSB, a member of the abbey, directed a separate project to create a smaller edition of the full Vulgate, published as Biblia Sacra iuxta vulgatam versionem; this continued to be revised to take the most current findings into account.

The abbey library housed the collection of the library of Monte Cassino while that monastery was undergoing reconstruction.

As a result of liturgical changes that had spurred the Vatican to produce a new translation of the Latin Bible, the Nova Vulgata, the Benedictine edition was no longer required for official purposes, and the abbey was suppressed in 1984. Its property was assigned to the Pontifical Institute of Sacred Music. Five monks were nonetheless allowed to complete the final two volumes of the Old Testament through the Pontifical Commission for the Revision and Emendation of the Vulgate, which were published under the abbey's name in 1987 and 1995.
