= Henri Quentin =

French Catholic abbot and philologist

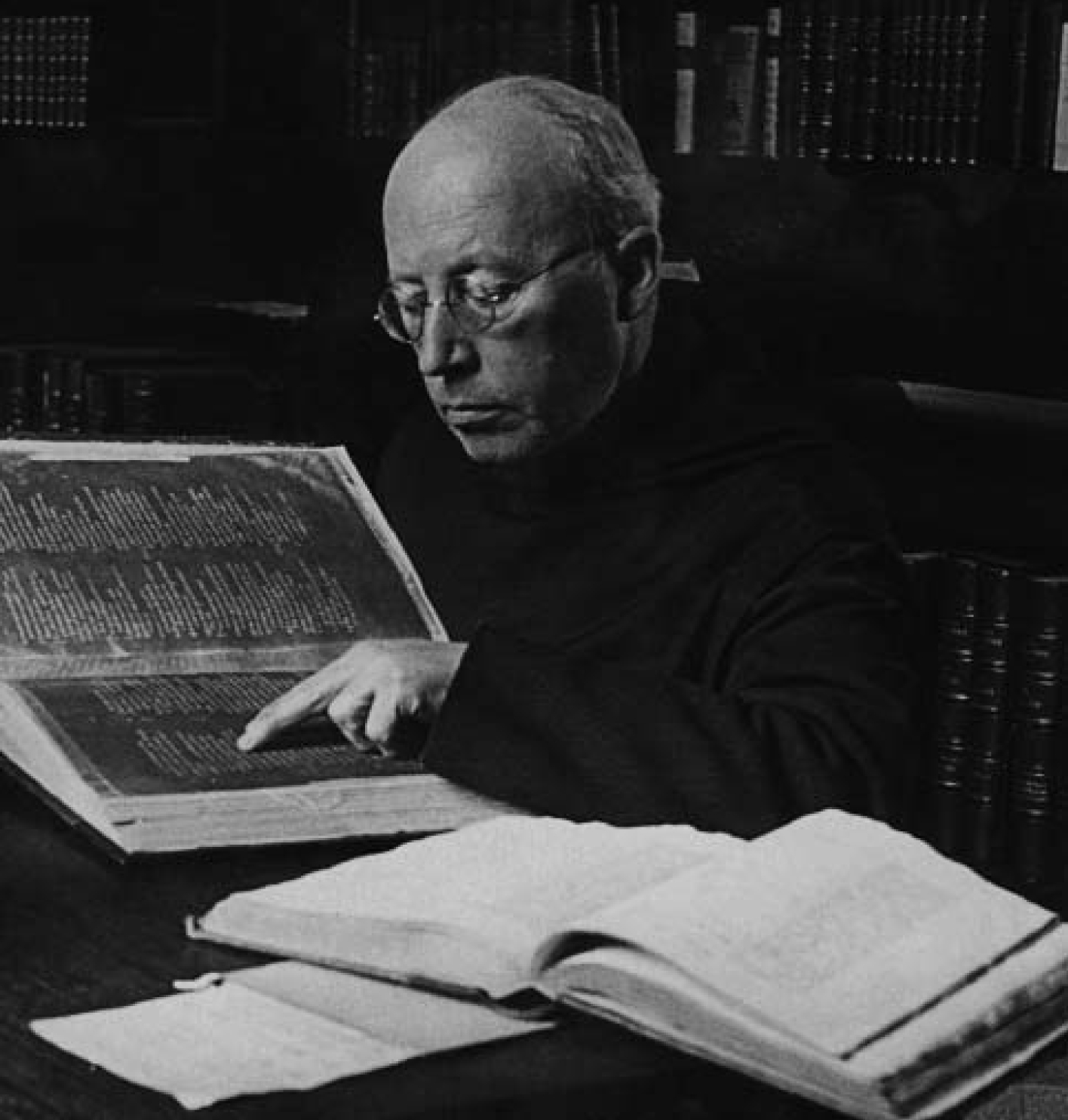

Dom Henri Quentin (7 October 1872, Saint-Thierry - 4 February 1935, Rome) was a French Benedictine abbot. A philologist specializing in biblical texts and martyrologies, he was the creator of an original method of textual criticism (sometimes called the neo-Lachmannian method). He pioneered techniques to compare texts and produce trees of relationships between version and editions in order to study their origins and variations.

== Life ==
After studying theology at the seminary of Rheims, he joined in 1892 Maredsous Abbey and in 1897 Solesmes Abbey. He was ordained priest in 1902. In 1907, he was called to Rome to direct the work of the Pontifical Commission for the Revision of the Vulgate, newly created by Pope Pius X and entrusted to the Order of St Benedict. It was during this time that he was faced with a wide range of versions of texts with differences. This forced him to explore the editions systematically using quantitative approaches. In March 1914, he was appointed consultant to the liturgical section of the Sacred Congregation of Rites. The Commission for the Revision of the Vulgate was transformed in 1933 into the Pontifical Abbey of St Jerome-in-the-City, where he became the first abbot.

== Method ==
Faced with the enormous mass of manuscripts of the Bible, and the special relationship of copyists with this text, Dom Quentin was obliged to change the approach he had adopted for martyrologies and criticize the methods traditionally applied in the establishment of a stemma codicum. The method of Dom Quentin has been much discussed and often criticized, but has attracted interest because of its arithmetical character and its capacity for automation. Quentin's method is identical to what is used in phylogenetic analysis for the study of evolution to produce unrooted trees.

== Publications ==
- Jean-Dominique Mansi et les grandes collections conciliaires, Paris, Ernest Leroux, 1900.
- Les martyrologes historiques du Moyen Âge : étude sur la formation du Martyrologe romain, Paris, 1908.
- Mémoire sur l'établissement du texte de la Vulgate. 1^{ère} partie : Octateuque, Paris, Gabalda, 1922 (Collectanea biblica latina VI).
- Essais de critique textuelle (Ecdotique), Paris, Picard, 1926.
- Hippolyte Delehaye (S.J.) et Henri Quentin (O.S.B.), Acta sanctorum novembris, tomi II pars posterior, qua continetur Hippolyti Delehaye commentarius perpetuus in Martyrologium Hieronymianum ad recensionem Henrici Quentin, Bruxelles, Société des Bollandistes, 1931.
