= Benedictine Vulgate =

Critical edition of the Vulgate Old Testament with Catholic deuterocanonical books

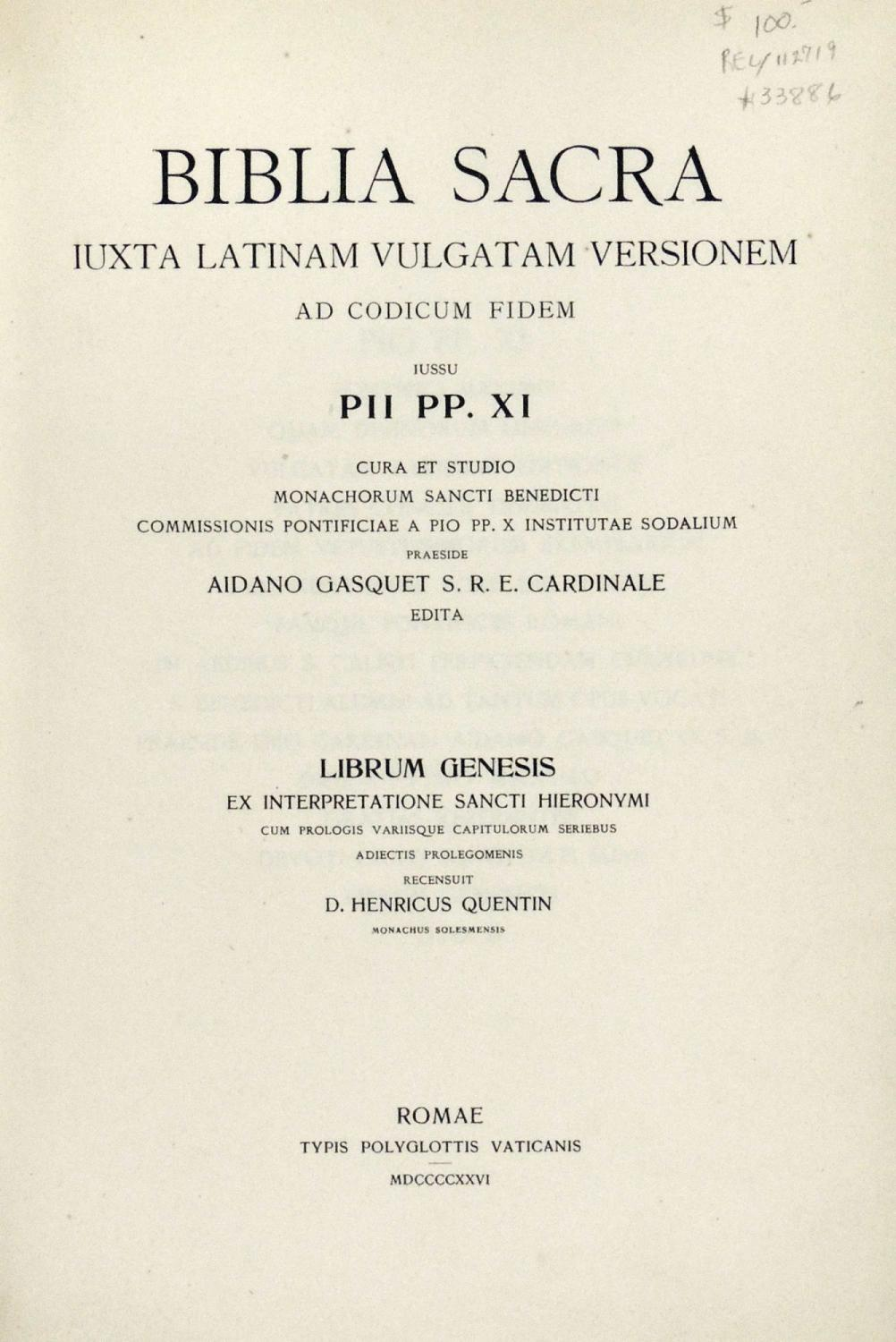
- Full name: Biblia sacra iuxta Latinam vulgatam versionem ad codicum fidem
- Other names: Vatican Vulgate; Roman Vulgate
- Complete Bible published: 1926–1995
- Authorship: Benedictine monks of the pontifical Abbey of St Jerome-in-the-City
- Textual basis: Vulgate

The Benedictine Vulgate, also called Vatican Vulgate or Roman Vulgate (full title: Biblia Sacra iuxta latinam vulgatam versionem ad codicum fidem, tr. Holy Bible following the Latin vulgate version faithfully to the manuscripts), is a critical edition of the Vulgate version of the Old Testament, Catholic deuterocanonical books included.

The edition was supported by and begun at the instigation of the Catholic Church, and was done by the Benedictine monks of the pontifical Abbey of St Jerome-in-the-City. The edition was published progressively from 1926 to 1995, in 18 volumes.

== History ==
In 1907, Pope Pius X commissioned the Benedictine Order to produce as pure a version as possible of Jerome's original text after conducting an extensive search for as-yet-unstudied manuscripts, particularly in Spain. This text was originally planned as the basis of a revised complete official Bible for the Catholic church to replace the Clementine edition.

The first volume, the Pentateuch, completed in 1926, lists as primary editor Henri Quentin, whose editorial methods, described in his book Mémoire sur l'établissement du texte de la Vulgate, proved to be somewhat controversial.

The Roman Vulgate reunited the Book of Ezra and the Book of Nehemiah into a single book, reversing the decisions of the Sixto-Clementine Vulgate.

In 1933, Pope Pius XI established the Pontifical Abbey of St Jerome-in-the-City to complete the work.

By the 1970s, as a result of liturgical changes that had spurred the Vatican to produce a new translation of the Latin Bible, the Nova Vulgata, the Benedictine edition was no longer required for official purposes, and the abbey was suppressed in 1984. Five monks were nonetheless allowed to complete the final two volumes of the Old Testament, which were published under the abbey's name in 1987 and 1995.

== See also ==
- Stuttgart Vulgate
- Oxford Vulgate
- Roman Septuagint

== Editions ==
- Biblia Sacra iuxta latinam vulgatam versionem ad codicum fidem. Pontifical Abbey of St Jerome-in-the-City (ed.). Rome: Libreria Editrice Vaticana. 1926–95. ISBN 8820921286. 18 vols.
