= Jean Gribomont =

Jean Gribomont (1920–1986) was a Benedictine scholar who professed as monk of the Abbey of Clervaux (Luxemburg) in 1939. He is noted for a vast range of publications in French (and some Latin) covering the origins and history of ascetic currents and monasticism, including the Syriac-speaking and eastern Asia Minor context of the fourth and fifth centuries of the common era. His publications include a major work and article on St. Basil, three encyclopaedia entries on Eustathius of Sebaste, studies of Messalianism, work in the Syriac domain and also of later Latin monasticism.

He was also involved in co-ordinating the first Colloquium Biblicum Lovaniense conference in 1949.

== Selected works ==
- Histoire du texte des Ascétiques de S. Basile, Louvain, 1953.
- Le monasticisme au IVè s., de Gangres au Messalianisme, 1957 (Texte u. Untersuchungen 64).
- Eustathe de Sébaste, Dictionnaire de Spiritualité, 1961; Dictionnaire d' Histoire et Géographie Ecclésiastiques, 1964, Dictionnaire,1990.
- Le dossier des origines du Messalianisme, in Epektasis, Mélanges patristiques offerts au Cardinal Jean Daniélou, Paris, 1972.
- Documents sur l' origine de l'Eglise Maronite, in Paroles d' Orient 1, Kaslik, 1974.
- La catéchèse de Sévère d'Antioche et le Credo, in Paroles d'Orient 6-7, Kaslik, 1975-76.
- Saint Basile, Evangile et Eglise, Abbaye de Bellefontaine, 1984.
- Introductions etc. to Rupert de Deutz, Les Oeuvres du Saint - Esprit, Sources Chrétiennes, Textes Monastiques, 1967, 1970.
- Contributions to J. Fontaine & Ch. Pietri, Le Monde Latin et la Bible, Beauchesne, 1985 and to Biblia sacra iuxta Vulgatam versionem (R. Weber), 1975.
- Le symbole de la foi de Séleucie-Ctésiphon(410) in Fischer, R.H. ed. A tribute to Arthur Vööbus: studies in early Christian literature and environment, primarily in the Syrian East, Chicago, 1977.
