= Sixtine Vulgate =

Catholic edition of the Vulgate published in 1590

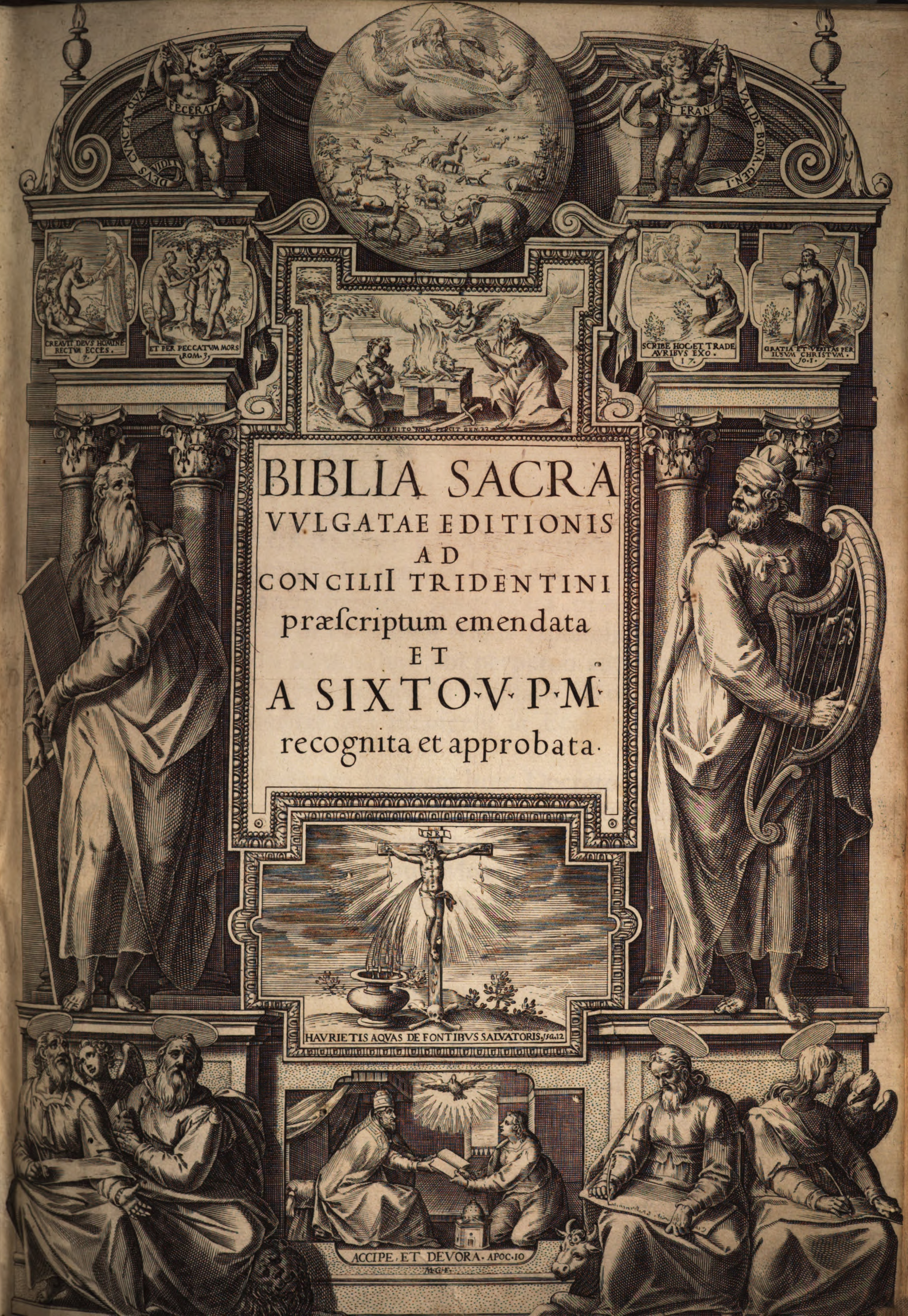
- Frontispiece of the Sixtine Vulgate
- Other names: Sistine Vulgate; Vulgata Sixtina
- Language: Late Latin
- Complete Bible published: 1590
- Online as: Sixtine Vulgate at Wikisource
- Textual basis: Vulgate
- Religious affiliation: Catholic Church
- Genesis 1:1–3 In principio creavit Deus cælum, et terram. Terra autem erat inanis et vacua, et tenebræ erant super faciem abyssi: et Spiritus Domini ferebatur super aquas. Dixitque Deus: Fiat lux. Et facta est lux. John 3:16 Sic enim Deus dilexit mundum, ut Filium suum unigenitum daret: ut omnis, qui credit in eum, non pereat, sed habeat vitam aeternam.

The Sixtine Vulgate or Sistine Vulgate (Latin: Vulgata Sixtina) is the edition of the Vulgate—a 4th-century Latin translation of the Bible that was written largely by Jerome—which was published in 1590, prepared by a commission on the orders of Pope Sixtus V and edited by himself. It was the first edition of the Vulgate authorised by a pope. Its official recognition was short-lived; the edition was replaced in 1592 by the Sixto-Clementine Vulgate.

In 1546, the Council of Trent had decreed that the Vulgate was authoritative and authentic, and ordered that it be printed as correctly as possible. No edition of the Vulgate officially approved by the Catholic Church existed at the time. Twenty years later, work to produce an official edition of the Vulgate began: Pius V appointed a commission to produce an official edition of the Vulgate. However, his successor, Gregory XIII, did not continue the work.

In 1586, Sixtus V appointed a commission to produce an official edition of the Vulgate. However, he was dissatisfied with the work of the commission. Considering himself a very competent editor, he edited the Vulgate with the help of a few people he trusted. In 1590, this edition was published and was preceded by a bull of Sixtus V saying this edition was the authentic edition recommended by the Council of Trent, that it should be taken as the standard of all future reprints, and that all copies should be corrected by it.

Three months later, in August, Sixtus V died. Nine days after the death of Sixtus V, the College of Cardinals suspended the sale of the Sixtine Vulgate and later ordered the destruction of the copies. In 1592, Clement VIII, arguing printing errors in the Sixtine Vulgate, recalled all copies of the Sixtine Vulgate still in circulation; some suspect his decision was in fact due to the influence of the Jesuits. In November of the same year, a revised version of the Sixtine, known as the Sixto-Clementine Vulgate or Clementine Vulgate, was issued by Clement VIII to replace the Sixtine Vulgate.

== History ==
=== Council of Trent ===
The Council of Trent decreed the Vulgate authoritative and "authentic" on 8 April 1546, and ordered it to be printed "quam emendatissime" (Note: Literally "in the most correct manner possible") ("with the fewest possible faults"). (Note: See the decree here: Fourth session – Decree concerning the editing and use of the sacred books) There was no authoritative edition of the Vulgate in the Catholic Church at that time; that would come in May (or April) 1590.

=== Elaboration of the text ===
==== Three pontifical commissions ====
Three pontifical commissions were successively charged to elaborate the text of the edition of the Vulgate for which the Council of Trent had requested publication. Up until the commissions of Pius V and Sixtus V, the work was done without any coordination.

After Sixtus V's death in 1590, two other commissions were organised, one after the other, under Gregory XIV in 1591.

===== Pius IV's commission =====
In 1561, Pius IV created a commission at Rome composed of four cardinals: Amulio, Morone, Scotti and Vitelli. This committee had only a very general role: to correct and print the ecclesiastical books which the Holy See had decided to reform or publish.

===== Pius V's commission =====
In 1566 or 1569, another commission was appointed by Pope Pius V (Congregatio pro emendatione Bibliorum) to produce an official edition of the Vulgate. This commission was composed of five cardinals (M. A. Colonna, G. Sirleto, C. Madruzzo, J. Souchier, and Antonio Carafa) and twelve advisors.

Gregory XIII did not appoint a commission for the Vulgate, and soon Gugliemo Sirleto "was the only one remaining to take care of the revision" of the Vulgate in Rome. Gregory XIII issued a commission for the emendation of the LXX after being convinced to do so by Cardinal Montalto (the future Sixtus V). Thomson states that the commission working on the Vulgate had to stop its work to instead work on the edition of the Septuagint. The work on this edition was finished in 1586 and the edition, known as the Roman Septuagint, was published the next year. This edition of the Septuagint was done to assist the revisers of the Latin Vulgate.

===== Sixtus V's commission =====
At the time Sixtus V became pope, in 1585, work on the edition of the Vulgate had barely begun.

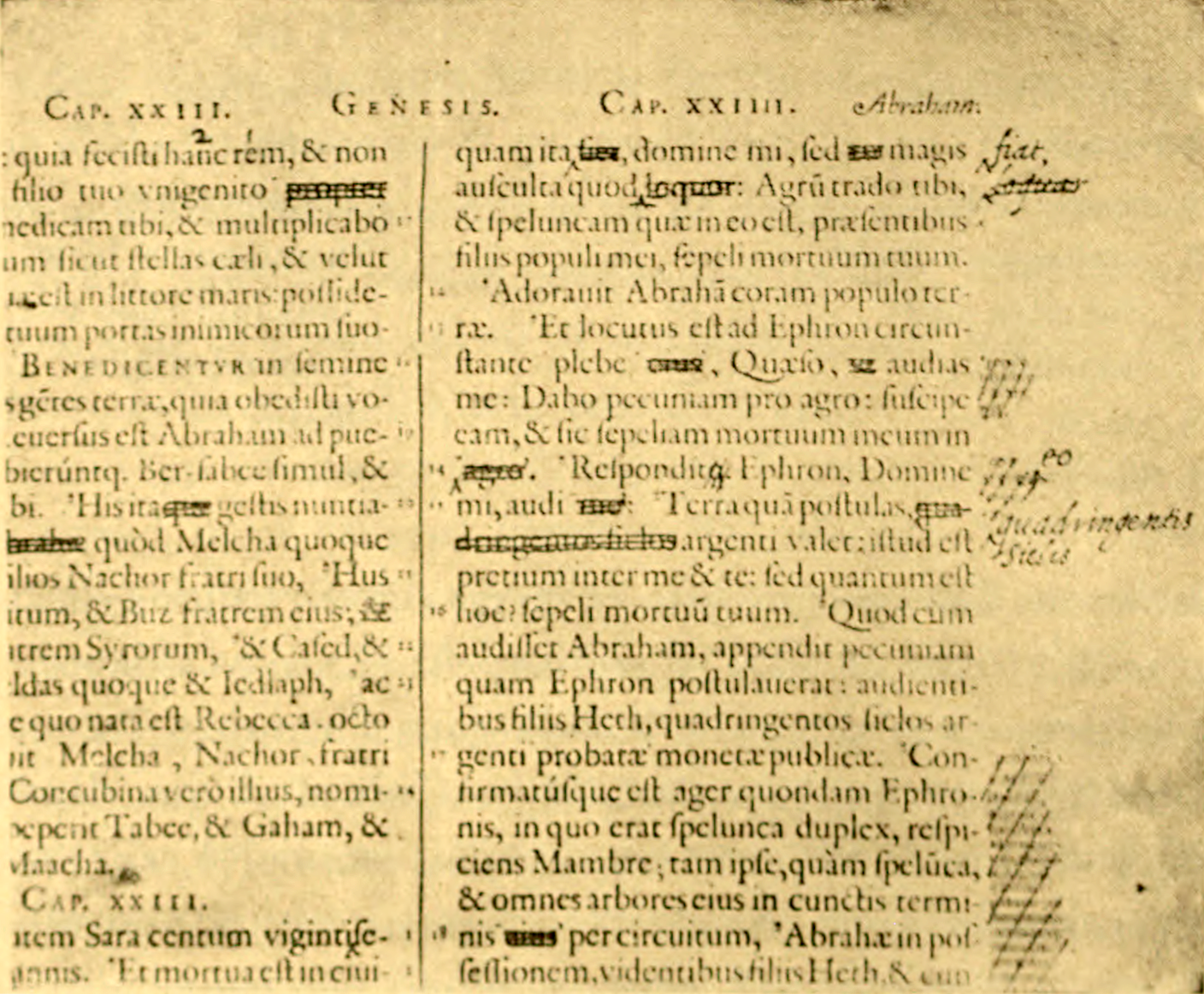
Facsimile of part of a page of the Codex Carafianus

In 1586, Sixtus V appointed a commission. The commission was under the presidency of Cardinal Carafa, and was composed of Flaminius Nobilius, Antonius Agellius, Lelio Landi, Bartholomew Valverde, and Petrus Morinus. They were helped by Fulvio Orsini.

The commission worked on the basis of the 1583 edition by Franciscus Lucas Brugensis of the Leuven Vulgate and "[g]ood manuscripts were used as authorities, including notably the Codex Amiatinus". The commission wrote annotations and corrected directly on an exemplar of the 1583 edition of the Leuven Vulgate; this Bible corrected by the commission is known as the Codex Carafianus.

==== Sixtus V's own editing work ====
At one point, Sixtus began to lose patience due to the slow progress of the commission. Nevertheless, "in view of the work which had already been carried out" the work of the commission was finished in 1588. However, Sixtus was dissatisfied with the work produced by the commission, and on 17 November 1588 told Carafa that the latter had to either give him a completed revised edition of the Vulgate or give him the Bible he was working on (the Codex Carafianus); Sixtus said it was because he wanted to revise everything himself. The same day, Carafa handed Sixtus the Bible annoted with corrections (the Codex Carafianus). (Note: In contrast to what is written here, Scrivener says that the commission presented the result of their work to Sixtus at the beginning of 1589.) According to Quentin, the corrections of the Codex Carafianus were "excellent", but they were "not presented in a convincing way. It is merely a list of readings without anything to indicate their value. Those readings, when put against the mainstream readings found in the Leuven Bible [Vulgate], seem[ed] to Sixtus V like some alternatives which should only be used instead of the mainstream text if they contain a real progress concerning the meaning or the literary quality of the passage".

Sixtus V worked by himself on the edition of the Vulgate. From 17 November 1588 until June 1589, he revised the text; until the end of November 1589, he corrected the proofs. Sixtus made the corrections using simple conjectures and working quickly. He used the Codex Carafianus. Sixtus was helped in his editing work by a few people he trusted, including Toledo and Rocca but excluding the members of the commission and Carafa.

Sixtus V took pride in being a very competent text editor. When he was only a minor friar, he had started editing the complete work of St. Ambrose, the sixth and last volume of which was published after he became pope. This edition of the complete work of St. Ambrose produced by Sixtus is regarded as the worst ever published; it "replaced the readings of the manuscripts by the least justified conjectures".

By the end of November, the text of the Vulgate was finished. Sixtus' editing work on the Vulgate was sent on 25 November 1589 to the Congregation of the Index. The aim of his work was less for the text to be satisfactory from the point of view of textual criticism, and way more to strengthen the faithfuls. The publication of the text was delayed for five months at the Congregation of the Index since most of its members, three out of five, were opposed to the publication of the text; those were Ascanio Colonna, William Allen and Girolamo Della Rovere. The members of the commission of Carafa were also opposed to the publication.

=== Publication ===
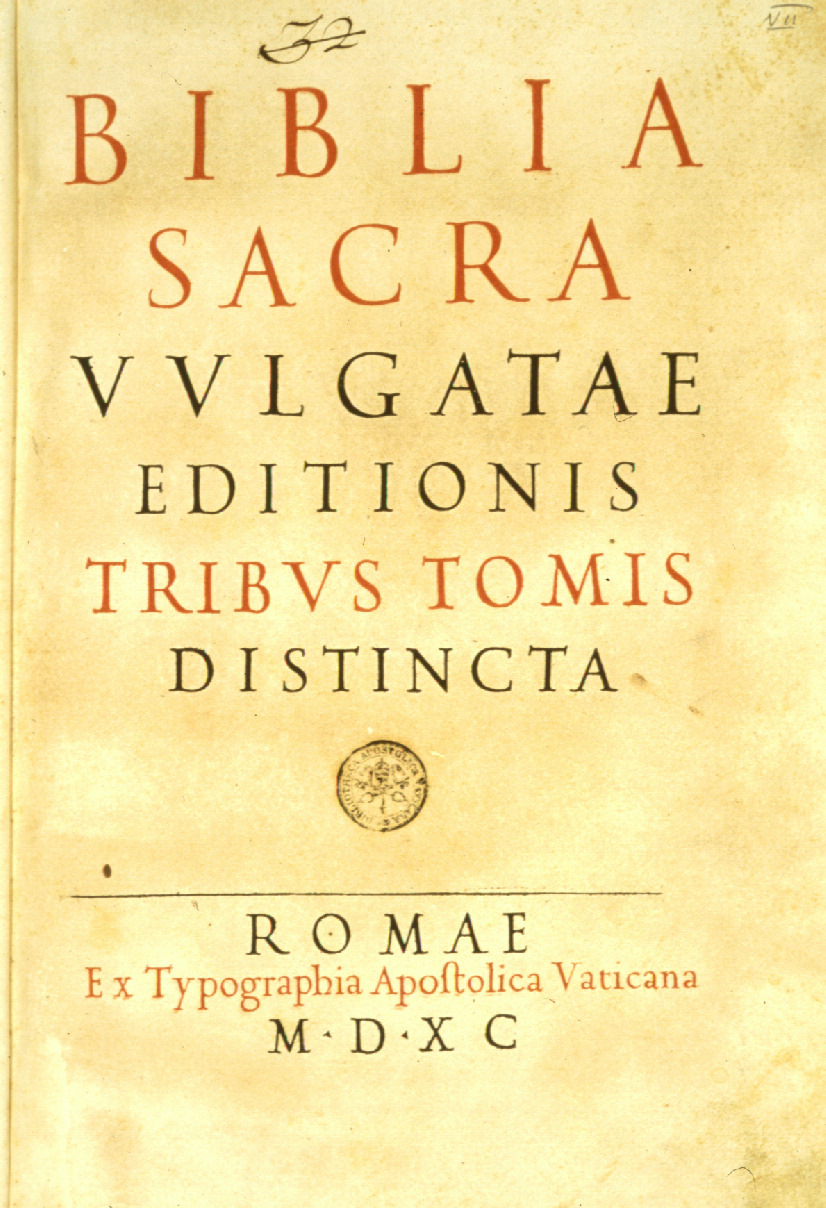
Title page of the Sixtine Vulgate

In May (or April) 1590 the completed work was issued in one volume, in a folio edition, containing three distinct parts, (Note: The title page bears the indication "three distinct volumes/sections" (tribus tomis distincta)) with the page numbering continuous throughout the entire volume. The Sixtine Vulgate was mostly free of typographical errors. Regardless, even after the printed edition was issued, Sixtus continued to tinker with the text, revising it either by hand or by pasting strips of paper on the text.

This edition is known as the Vulgata Sixtina, Sixtine Vulgate, or Sistine Vulgate. The full title of the Sixtine Vulgate is: Biblia sacra Vulgatae Editionis ad Concilii Tridentini praescriptum emendata et a Sixto V P. M. recognita et approbata.

The edition was preceded by the bull Aeternus Ille, in which the Pope declared the authenticity of the new Bible. The bull stipulated "that it was to be considered as the authentic edition recommended by the Council of Trent, that it should be taken as the standard of all future reprints, and that all copies should be corrected by it". The bull also stated that "[t]his edition was not to be reprinted for 10 years except at the Vatican, and after that any edition must be compared with the Vatican edition, so that 'not even the smallest particle should be altered, added or removed' under pain of the 'greater excommunication'". Furthermore, the bull demanded that all missals and breviaries be revised to use the text of the Sixtine Vulgate, and that the Sixtine Vulgate replace all other Bibles within four months in Italy and within eight months elsewhere. This was the first time the Vulgate was recognized as the official authoritative text.

Based on his study of testimonies by those who surrounded the pope during the making of the Sixtine Vulgate, and the fact that the bull Aeternus Ille is not present in the bullarium, Jesuit Xavier-Marie Le Bachalet claims the publication of this Bible does not have papal infallibility because the bull establishing this edition as the standard was never promulgated by Sixtus V. Le Bachalet says that the bull was only printed within the edition of the Bible at the order of Sixtus V so as not to delay the printing and that the published edition of the Bible was not the final one; that Sixtus was still revising the text of this edition of the Bible, and his death prevented him from completing a final edition and promulgating an official bull. (Note: For a critique of this work of Le Bachalet, see The Journal of Theological Studies, Vol. 14, No. 55 (April, 1913), pp. 472–474.)

==== Textual characteristics ====
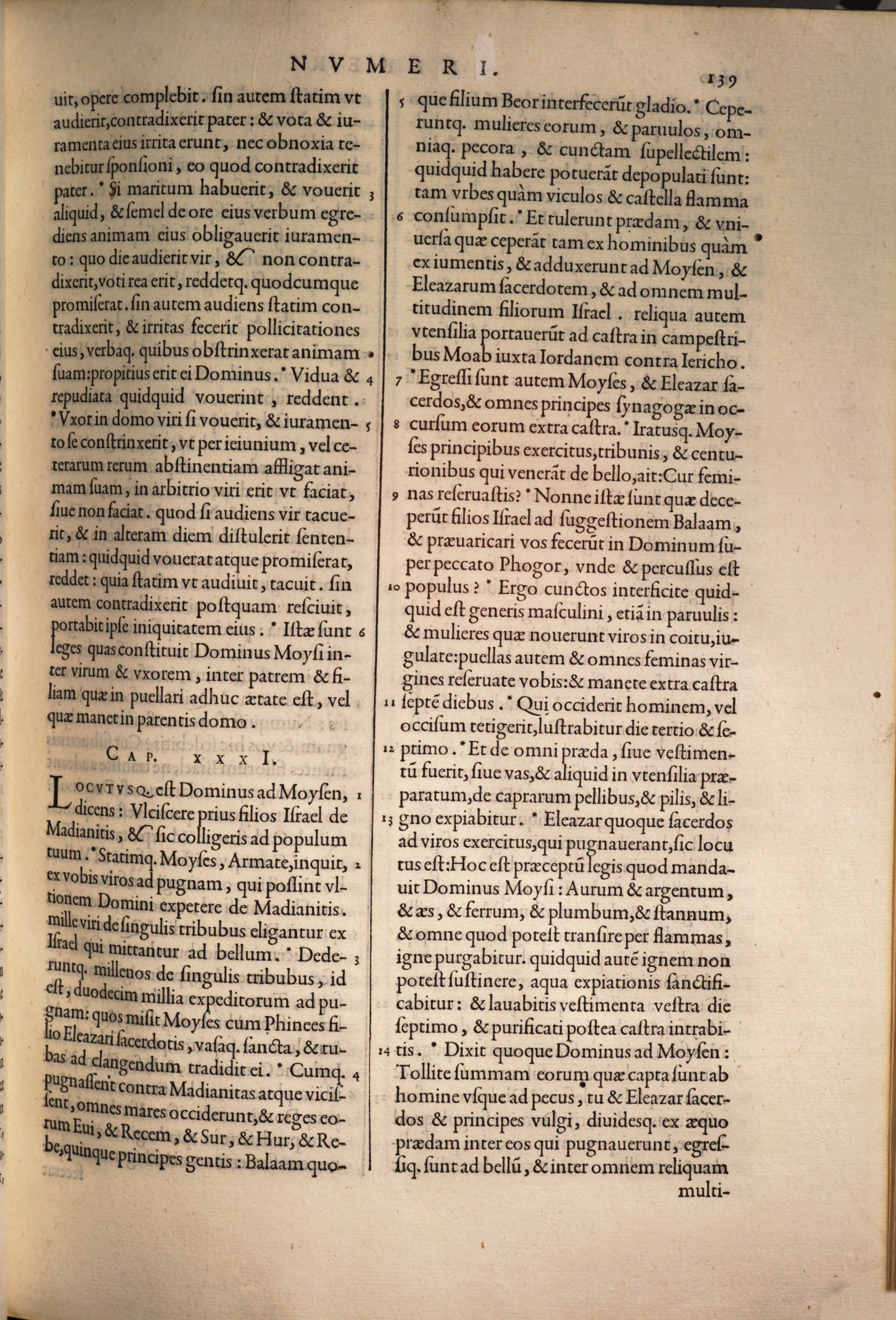
Page of the original Sixtine Vulgate, Numbers ch. 30–31. Note the unusual verse numbering. The end of 30:11 and the whole verses 30:12 & 13, which should be within the verse number 5, are missing.

Two whole verses and the end of one were dropped from the Book of Numbers: the end of Numbers 30:11 and the whole verses 12 and 13 ("has bound herself by a vow or an oath, if her husband heard it and remained silent, and he did not contradict the promise, she shall repay what she had promised. But if he promptly contradicts it, she shall not be held liable to the promise. For her husband has contradicted it. And the Lord will be favorable to her". Catholic Public Domain Version). However, it is unclear whether this was a printing error or an editorial choice, "as the passage was cited by moral theologians to substantiate the view that husbands may annul vows of chastity taken by their wives without their consent".

According to Eberhard Nestle, the Sixtine Vulgate edition had a text more nearly akin to that of Robertus Stephanus than of John Hentenius, an analysis also shared by Scrivener and Hastings; Hastings claims that the text of the Sixtine Vulgate resembled the 1540 edition of Stephanus. Kenyon also thinks the Sixtine Vulgate resembles the text of Stephanus and argues that it was "evidently based" on that text. The Sixtine Vulgate used a new system of verse enumeration, different to that of the Stephanus edition. According to Antonio Gerace, the Sixtine Vulgate "was even closer to the Leuven Vulgate". Thomson states that in many cases Sixtus V merely restored the reading of the 1583 Leuven Vulgate compared to the Codex Carafianus. He adds that the reason Sixtus V did so was because his goal was "to oppose heresy, not to arouse suspicions that the hitherto generally accepted text was corrupt".

=== Death of Sixtus V ===
On 27 August 1590 Sixtus V died. After his death, many alleged that the text of the Sixtine Vulgate was "too error-ridden for general use". On 5 September of the same year, the College of Cardinals stopped all further sales of the Sixtine Vulgate and bought and destroyed as many copies as possible (Note: "However, this work [the Sixtine Vulgate] was not appreciated by the Congregation of the Cardinals and a week [sic, 9 days] after the death of Pope Sixtus V (27 August 1590) they ordered, first, the suspension of the selling of this edition and the destruction of the printed copies shortly thereafter.") by burning them; the reason invoked for this action was printing inaccuracies in Sixtus V's edition of the Vulgate. Metzger believes that the inaccuracies may have been a pretext and that the attack against this edition had been instigated by the Jesuits, "whom Sixtus had offended by putting one of Bellarmine's books on the 'Index', (Note: "Bellarmine's intellectual efforts gained him a more central position within the Roman Curia but he also encountered dangerous setbacks. In 1587 he became a member of the Congregation of the Index and in 1598 became one of the consultores of the Inquisition. Meanwhile, the implications of the doctrine of potestas indirecta angered Pope Sixtus V, who often opposed the Society of Jesus because he thought the Society's doctrines diminished the authority of the bishop of Rome. In 1589–90 Sixtus moved to put Volume 1 of Controversiae on the Index of Prohibited Books while Bellarmine was in France on a diplomatic mission. However, the Congregation of the Index and, later, the Society of Jesus resisted this. In 1590 Sixtus died, and with him the project of the Sistine Index also died.") and took this method of revenging themselves". Quentin suggests that this decision was due to the fact that the heretics could have used against the Catholic Church the passages of the Bible which Sixtus V had either removed or modified. Bellarmine did not take part in the ban on the Sixtine Vulgate as he was in Paris when Sixtus published the Sixtine Vulgate, and only came back in Rome in November 1590.

After Sixtus V's death, Robert Bellarmine wrote a letter in 1602 to Clement VIII trying to dissuade him from resolving the question of the auxiliis divinae gratiae by himself. In his letter Bellarmine wrote concerning the Sixtine Vulgate: "Your Holiness also knows in what danger Sixtus V put himself and put the whole Church, by trying to correct the Bible according to his own judgment: and for me I really do not know if there has ever been greater danger".

=== Recall of the Sixtine Vulgate ===
In January 1592, almost immediately after his election, Clement VIII recalled all copies of the Sixtine Vulgate as one of his first acts. The reason invoked for recalling Sixtus V's edition was printing errors, although the Sixtine Vulgate was mostly free of them.

According to James Hastings, Clement VIII's "personal hostility" toward Sixtus and his belief that the Sixtine Vulgate was not "a worthy representative of the Vulgate text" were the reasons behind the recall. Eberhard Nestle suggests that the revocation was really due to the influence of the Jesuits, whom Sixtus had offended by putting one of Bellarmine's books on the Index Librorum prohibitorum. Kenyon writes that the Sixtine Vulgate was "full of errors", but that Clement VIII was also motivated in his decision to recall the edition by the Jesuits, "whom Sixtus had offended". Sixtus regarded the Jesuits with disfavour and suspicion. He considered making radical changes to their constitution, but his death prevented this from being carried out. Sixtus V objected to some of the Jesuits' rules and especially to the title "Society of Jesus". He was at the point of changing these when he died. Sixtus V "had some conflict with the Society of Jesus more generally, especially regarding the Society's concept of blind obedience to the General, which for Sixtus and other important figures of the Roman Curia jeopardized the preeminence of the role of the pope within the Church". Jaroslav Pelikan, without giving any more details, says that the Sixtine Vulgate "proved to be so defective that it was withdrawn".

Few copies of the Sixtine Vulgate were saved from destruction.

== Some differences from the Leuven edition ==
The text of the Sixtine Vulgate has some differences with the text of the Leuven Vulgate. For example, in the Sixtine Vulgate, in the Book of Genesis chapters 40–50, there were 43 changes made compared to the editions of the Leuven Vulgate. Of these 43 corrections, 31 are of purely orthographic significance; and of those 31, six concern proper nouns.

== In critical editions of the Bible text ==
The Sixtine Vulgate is cited in the Novum Testamentum Graece, or "Nestle-Aland", only when it differs from the Sixto-Clementine Vulgate, and is designated in said Nestle-Aland by the siglum vg^{s}. It is also cited in the Oxford Vulgate New Testament, where it is designated by the siglum S. It is not cited in the Stuttgart Vulgate.

== Sixto-Clementine Vulgate ==
After Clement VIII had recalled all the copies of the Sixtine Vulgate in 1592, in November of that year he published a new official version of the Vulgate known as the Clementine Vulgate, also called the Sixto-Clementine Vulgate. Faced with about six thousand corrections on matters of detail, and a hundred that were important, and wishing to save the honour of Sixtus V, Bellarmine undertook the writing of the preface of this edition. He ascribed all the imperfections of Sixtus' Vulgate to press errors. (Note: See also Bellarmine's testimony in his autobiography: In 1591, Gregory XIV wondered what to do about the Bible published by Sixtus V, where so many things had been wrongly corrected. There was no lack of serious men who were in favor of a public condemnation. But, in the presence of the Sovereign Pontiff, I demonstrated that this edition should not be prohibited, but only corrected in such a way that, in order to save the honor of Sixtus V, it be republished amended: this would be accomplished by making disappear as soon as possible the unfortunate modifications, and by reprinting under the name of this Pontiff this new version with a preface where it would be explained that, in the first edition, because of the haste that had been brought, some errors were made through the fault either of printers or of other people. This is how I returned good for evil to Pope Sixtus. Sixtus, indeed, because of my thesis on the direct power of the Pope, had put my Controversies on the Index of Prohibited Books until after correction; but as soon as he died, the Sacred Congregation of Rites ordered my name to be removed from the Index. My advice pleased Pope Gregory. He created a Congregation to quickly revise the Sistine version and to bring it closer to the vulgates in circulation, in particular that of Leuven. [...] After the death of Gregory (XIV) and Innocent (V), Clement VIII edited this revised Bible, under the name of Sixtus (V), with the Preface of which I am the author. Bellarmino, Roberto Francesco Romolo (1999). "Memorie autobiografiche (1613)". In Giustiniani, Pasquale (ed.). Autobiografia (1613) (in Italian). Translated by Galeota, Gustavo. Brescia: Morcelliana. pp. 59–60. ISBN 88-372-1732-3. (in original Latin: Vita ven. Roberti cardinalis Bellarmini, pp. 30–31); (in French here, pp. 106–107)) According to Quentin, "a slight possibility remains that Sixtus V, whom we know worked until the last day of his life to purge his Bible of the printing mistakes it contained, had let slip a few words which were heard by his familiars, one of whom was Angelo Rocca, giving the impression that he was planning a new edition".

Scrivener notes that to avoid the appearance of a conflict between the two popes, the Clementine Bible was published under the name of Sixtus, with a preface by Bellarmine. This preface asserted that Sixtus had intended to publish a new edition due to errors that had occurred in the printing of the first, but had been prevented from doing this by his death, and that now, in accordance with his desire, the work was completed by his successor.

The full name of the Clementine Vulgate was: Biblia sacra Vulgatae Editionis, Sixti Quinti Pont. Max. iussu recognita atque edita (translation: "The Holy Bible of the Common/Vulgate Edition identified and published by the order of Pope Sixtus V".) The fact that the Clementine edition retained the name of Sixtus on its title page is the reason the Clementine Vulgate is sometimes known as the Sixto-Clementine Vulgate.

Nestle notes: "It may be added that the first edition to contain the names of both the Popes [Sixtus V and Clement VIII] upon the title page is that of 1604. The title runs: 'Sixti V. Pont. Max. iussu recognita et Clementis VIII. auctoritate edita'". Scrivener and Hastings share the same analysis. Hastings points out that "[t]he regular form of title in a modern Vulgate Bible — 'Biblia Sacra Vulgatae Editionis Sixti V. Pont. Max. jussu recognita et Clementis VIII. auctoritate edita' — cannot be traced at present earlier than 1604". Up to that time, Sixtus seems to have appeared alone on the title page; after this date, Clement occasionally figures by himself.

== See also ==
- Bible translations into Latin
- Latin Psalters
- Vulgate
- Sixto-Clementine Vulgate
- Nova Vulgata
