= Cornelis Reineri =

Dutch Catholic theologian

Cornelis Reineri or Reyneri, Latinized Cornelius Goudanus (1525–1609) was a Dutch Catholic theologian who spent his entire adult life at the University of Leuven.

== Life ==
Reineri was born in Gouda in 1525. He matriculated at Pig College, Leuven, and graduated Bachelor of Arts in 1549, the first of the 163 students in his year. From 1550 to 1554 he was professor of philosophy. On 1 June 1568 he graduated Doctor of Sacred Theology, and was appointed to a professorship in theology and a canonry in St. Peter's Church, Leuven. Together with Joannes Molanus and Augustinus Hunnaeus he was a member of the committee of theologians who oversaw Franciscus Lucas Brugensis's revision of the Leuven Vulgate (published at the Plantin Press in 1574). From 1566 to 1572 he was involved in running Holy Ghost College, and in 1572 became president of Arras College. In 1576 he advised on the licitness of the Pacification of Ghent. The Dutch Revolt made his tenure as president extraordinarily difficult, with soldiers billeted in the college in 1578. In 1604 he established a scholarship for students at Pope's College. He died on 16 December 1609 and was buried in the choir of St Peter's Church.
