= Sixto-Clementine Vulgate =

Catholic edition of Vulgate published in 1592

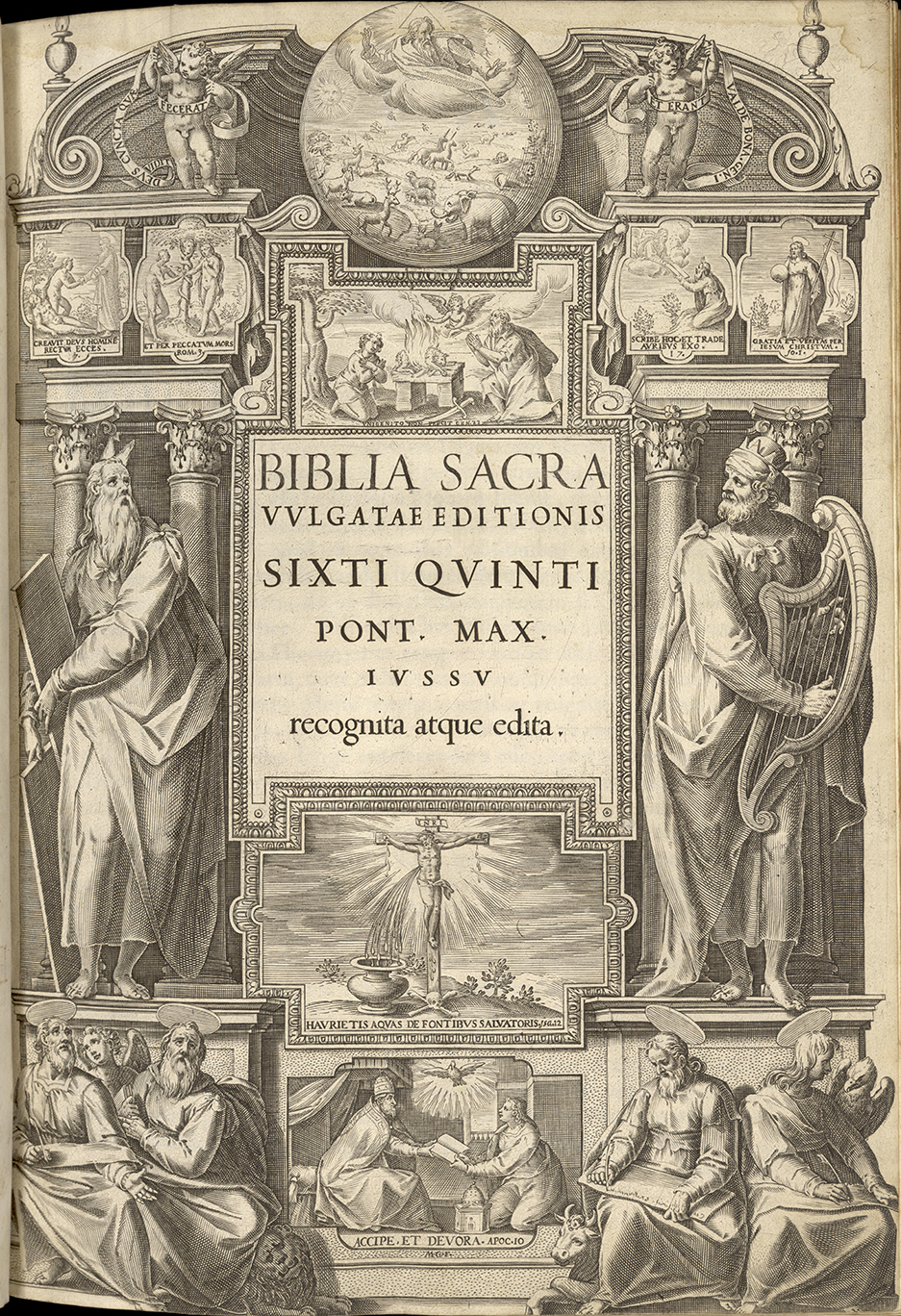
- Frontispiece of the Sixto-Clementine Vulgate (1592).
- Other names: Clementine Vulgate; Latin: Vulgata Clementina
- Language: Late Latin
- Complete Bible published: 1592
- Online as: Sixto-Clementine Vulgate at Wikisource
- Textual basis: Vulgate
- Religious affiliation: Catholic Church
- Genesis 1:1–3 In principio creavit Deus cælum et terram. Terra autem erat inanis et vacua, et tenebræ erant super faciem abyssi : et spiritus Dei ferebatur super aquas. Dixitque Deus : Fiat lux. Et facta est lux. John 3:16 Sic enim Deus dilexit mundum, ut Filium suum unigenitum daret : ut omnis qui credit in eum, non pereat, sed habeat vitam æternam.

The Sixto-Clementine Vulgate or Clementine Vulgate (Latin: Vulgata Clementina) is an edition of the Latin Vulgate, the official Bible of the Roman Catholic Church. It was the second edition of the Vulgate to be formally authorized by the Catholic Church, the first being the Sixtine Vulgate. The Clementine Vulgate was promulgated in 1592 by Pope Clement VIII, hence its name. The Sixto-Clementine Vulgate was used officially in the Catholic Church until 1979, when the Nova Vulgata was promulgated by Pope John Paul II. Texts from the Clementine Vulgate can also be found in the 1962 breviary of the Catholic Church, although the Tridentine Mass retains many Vetus Latina passages.

The Sixto-Clementine Vulgate is a revision of the Sixtine Vulgate; the latter had been published two years earlier under Sixtus V. Nine days after the death of Sixtus V, who had issued the Sixtine Vulgate, the College of Cardinals suspended the sale of the Sixtine Vulgate and later ordered the destruction of the copies. Thereafter, two commissions under Gregory XIV were in charge of the revision of the Sixtine Vulgate. In 1592, Clement VIII, arguing printing errors in the Sixtine Vulgate, recalled all copies of the Sixtine Vulgate still in circulation; some suspect his decision was in fact due to the influence of the Jesuits. In the same year, a revised edition of the Sixtine Vulgate was published and promulgated by Clement VIII; this edition is known as the Sixto-Clementine Vulgate, or Clementine Vulgate.

== History ==
=== Sixtine Vulgate ===
The Sixtine Vulgate prepared under Pope Sixtus V was published in 1590; it was "accompanied by a Bull [Aeternus Ille], in which [...] Sixtus V declared it was to be considered the authentic edition recommended by the Council of Trent, that it should be taken as the standard of all future reprints, and that all copies should be corrected by it". The College of Cardinals was dissatisfied with the Sixtine Vulgate; on 5 September 1590, nine days after Pope Sixtus V's death, they ordered the suspension of its sales, withdrew as many copies as possible, and shortly afterwards ordered the destruction of the printed copies.

=== Gregory XIV's two pontifical commissions ===
An official version of the Vulgate was still needed. Therefore, Pope Gregory XIV in 1591 created a fourth commission to revise the Sixtine Vulgate, (Note: Three commissions had been created by Pius IV, Pius V and Sixtus V. See Sixtine Vulgate#Three pontifical commissions.) which was subsequently reorganised as the fifth and final commission later the same year. The fourth commission was created by Gregory XIV on 7 February 1591. It was presided over by M. A. Colonna and comprised six other cardinals working on the revision. Ten other people were part of the commission as advisors, including Robert Bellarmine. These last commissions decided to make only the changes which were really necessary: to do so, the commission would consult ancient manuscripts in Latin, Greek, and Hebrew. It was also decided to restore the passages unduly removed by Sixtus V, remove the additions, examine the other passages and correct them if needed, and revise the punctuation.

The fourth commission worked slightly more than one month; during this time the revision of the Book of Genesis was completed and on 18 March the revision of Exodus began. However, the commission was progressing slowly, and the revision was expected to take a year. Due to this slowness, the size of the commission was reduced, its mode of operation changed, and its workplace moved to the villa of M. A. Colonna in Zagarolo. Two people were members of this commission: M. A. Colonna, its president, and William Allen. This commission also comprised eight other people as advisors: Bartholomew Miranda, Andrea Salvener, Antonius Agellius, Robert Bellarmine, Bartholomew Valverde, Lelio Landi, Petrus Morinus, and Angelo Rocca.

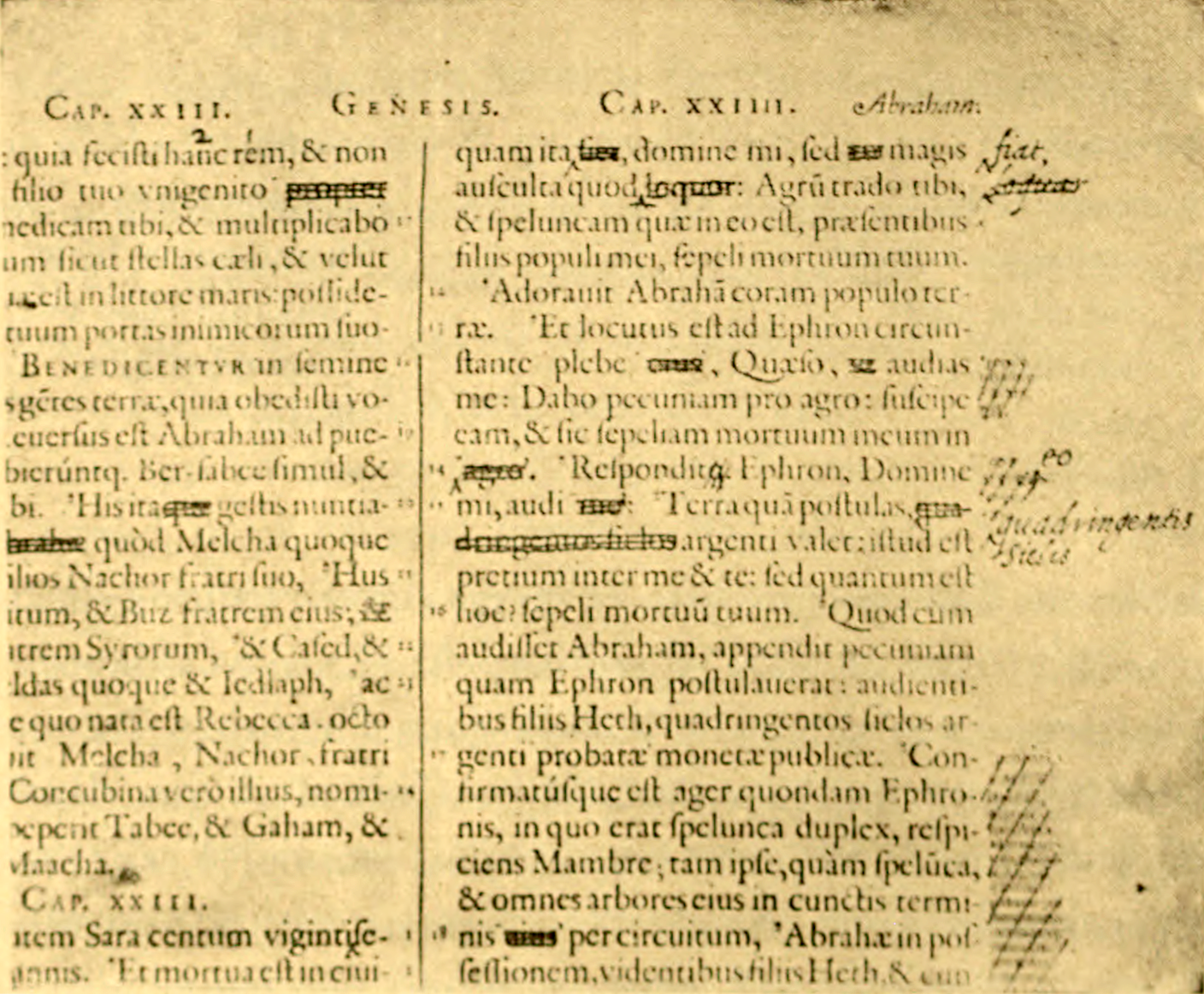
Facsimile of part of a page of the Codex Carafianus

Supposedly, the work of revision was finished in nineteen days thanks to the guidance of the Codex Carafianus – the codex which contained the propositions made to Sixtus V by the commission presided over by Cardinal Carafa, which is a 1583 edition of the Leuven Vulgate that had been emended by the third commission under Carafa – and the experience of four members of the commission who had previously taken part in the work to produce the Sixtine edition (Landi, Valverde, Agellius, and Rocca). The work was completed either after 19 days on 23 June, or on 5 July or before, or in early October, 1591. Brooke Foss Westcott notes that "even if it can be shown that the work extended over six months, it is obvious that there was no time for the examination of new authorities, but only for making a rapid revision with the help of the materials already collected". The basis of the commission's work was the Codex Carafianus.

Francis J. Thomson considers that the work of revision was rather entrusted to the Congregations for the Index under the leadership of M. A. Colonna. Thomson adds that the Congregation included among others the cardinals Girolamo Della Rovere, Ascanio Colonna, William Allen, Frederico Borromeo as well as Robert Bellarmine and Francisco de Toledo. Thomson states that the "old idea that a special commission was entrusted with the work of revision [of the Sixtine Vulgate] is incorrect".

Gregory XIV died on 15 October 1591; his direct successor, Innocent IX, died on 30 December the same year, less than two months after his election. In January 1592, Clement VIII became pope. Clement VIII resumed work on the revision to produce a final edition; he appointed Francisco de Toledo, Agostino Valier and Federico Borromeo as editors, with Robert Bellarmine, Antonius Agellius, Petrus Morinus and two others to assist them. "Under Clement VIII's leadership, the commission's work was continued and drastically revised, with the Jesuist scholar Cardinal Robert Bellarmine (1542–1624) bringing to the task his lifelong research on the Vulgate text".

=== Clement VIII's recall of the Sixtine Vulgate ===
In January 1592, Clement VIII became pope and immediately recalled all copies of the Sixtine Vulgate as one of his first acts. The reason stated for the recall was printing errors, although the Sixtine Vulgate was mostly free of those.

According to James Hastings, "[t]he real reasons for the recall of the editions must have been partly personal hostility to Sixtus, and partly a conviction that the book was not quite a worthy representative of the Vulgate text". Eberhard Nestle suggests that the revocation was really due to the influence of the Jesuits, whom Sixtus had offended by putting one of Bellarmine's books on the Index Librorum Prohibitorum (list of banned books). Frederic G. Kenyon writes that the Sixtine Vulgate was "full of errors" but that Clement VIII was also motivated in his decision to recall the edition by the Jesuits, "whom Sixtus had offended". Metzger believes that the inaccuracies may have been a pretext and that the attack against this edition had been instigated by the Jesuits, "whom Sixtus had offended by putting one of Bellarmine's books on the 'Index', (Note: "Bellarmine's intellectual efforts gained him a more central position within the Roman Curia but he also encountered dangerous setbacks. In 1587 he became a member of the Congregation of the Index and in 1598 became one of the consultores of the Inquisition. Meanwhile, the implications of the doctrine of potestas indirecta angered Pope Sixtus V, who often opposed the Society of Jesus because he thought the Society's doctrines diminished the authority of the bishop of Rome. In 1589–90 Sixtus moved to put Volume 1 of Controversiae on the Index of Prohibited Books while Bellarmine was in France on a diplomatic mission. However, the Congregation of the Index and, later, the Society of Jesus resisted this. In 1590 Sixtus died, and with him the project of the Sistine Index also died.") and took this method of revenging themselves". Sixtus regarded the Jesuits with disfavour and suspicion. He considered making radical changes to their constitution, but his death prevented this from being carried out. Sixtus V objected to some of the Jesuits' rules and especially to the title "Society of Jesus", and was on the point of changing them when he died. Sixtus V "had some conflict with the Society of Jesus more generally, especially regarding the Society’s concept of blind obedience to the General, which for Sixtus and other important figures of the Roman Curia jeopardized the preeminence of the role of the pope within the Church".

According to Jaroslav Pelikan, the Sixtine Vulgate "proved to be so defective that it was withdrawn".

=== Publication ===
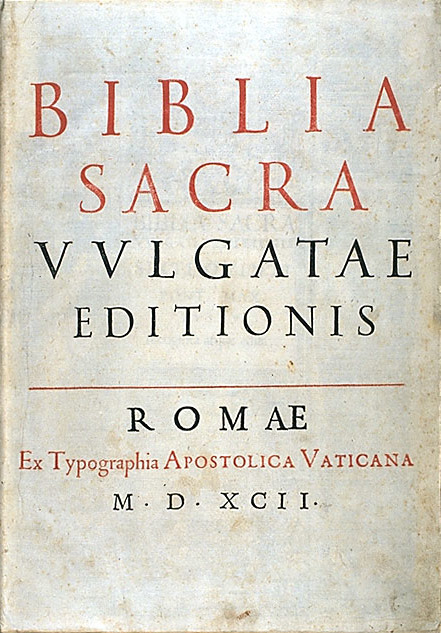
Title page of the Sixto-Clementine Vulgate (1592)

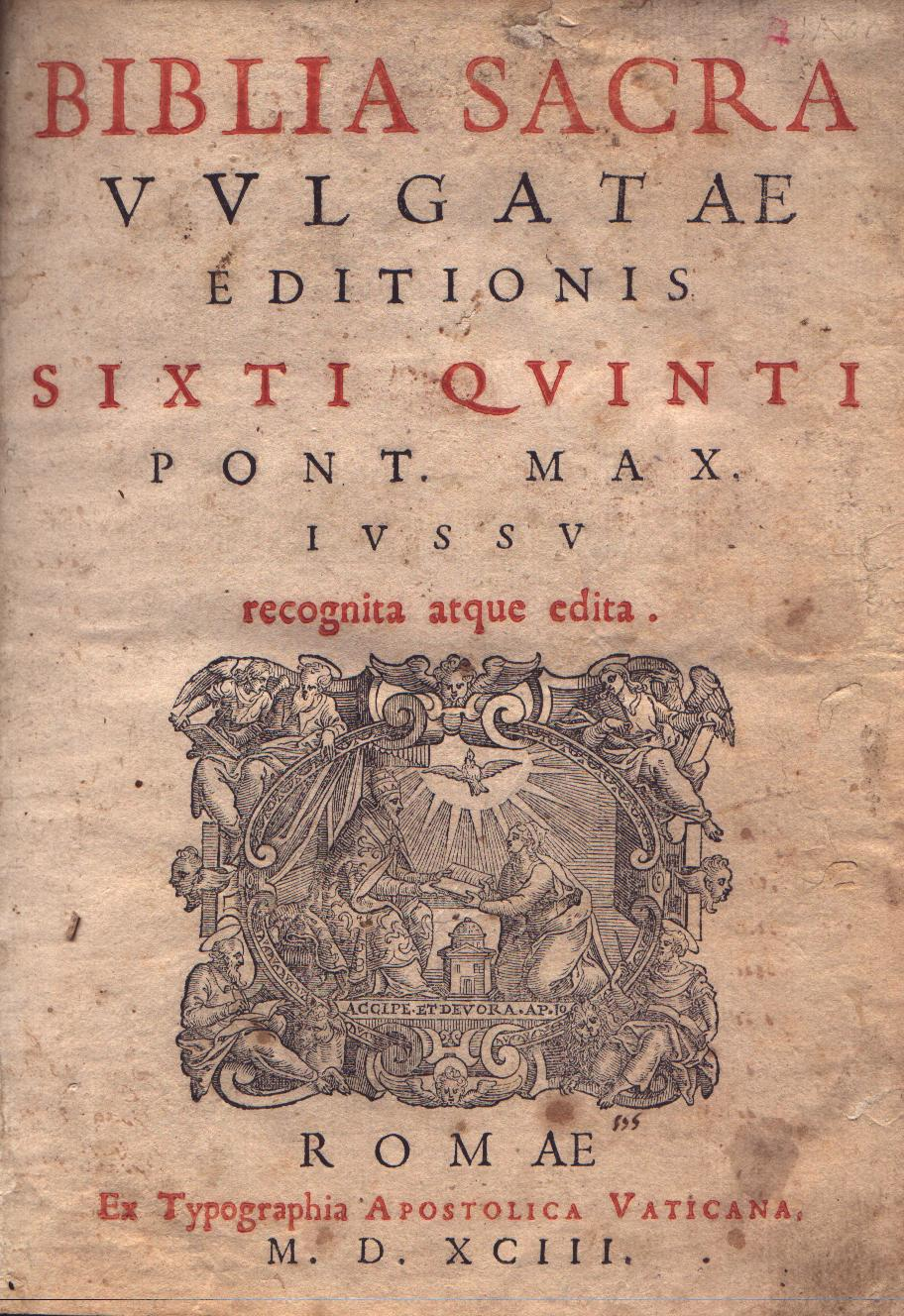
Title page of the 1593 edition

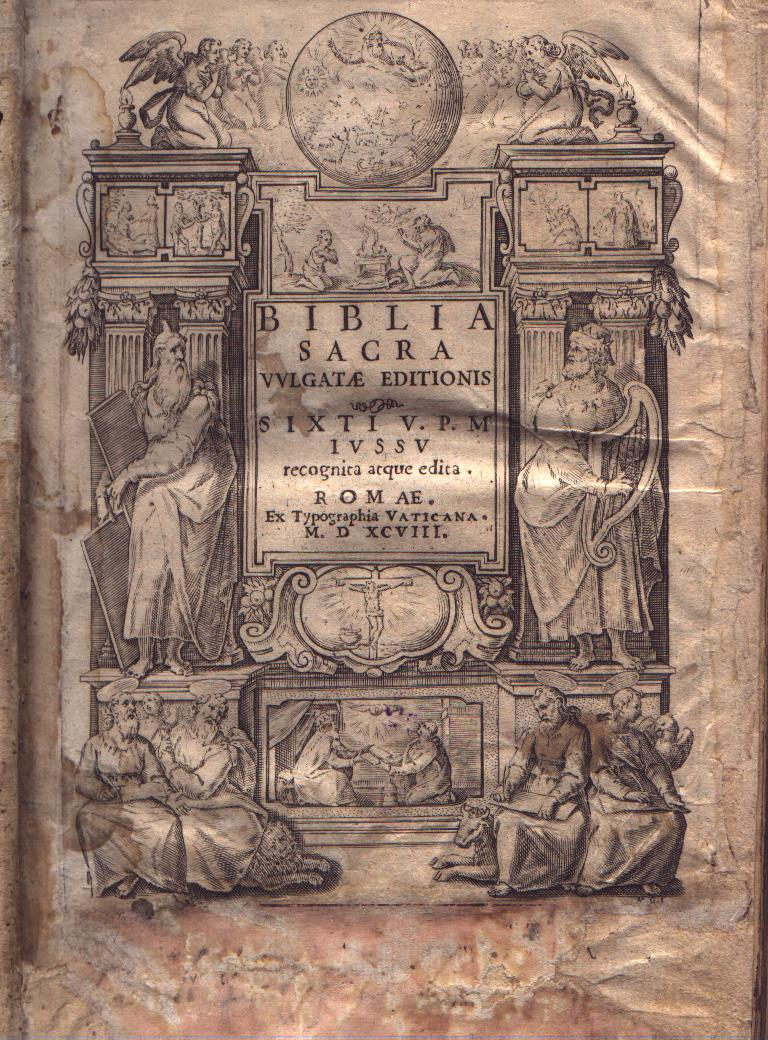
Frontispiece of the 1598 edition

The Clementine Vulgate was printed on 9 November 1592, in folio format, with an anonymous preface written by Cardinal Robert Bellarmine. (Note: See also Bellarmine's testimony in his autobiography: In 1591, Gregory XIV wondered what to do about the Bible published by Sixtus V, where so many things had been wrongly corrected. There was no lack of serious men who were in favor of a public condemnation. But, in the presence of the Sovereign Pontiff, I demonstrated that this edition should not be prohibited, but only corrected in such a way that, in order to save the honor of Sixtus V, it be republished amended: this would be accomplished by making disappear as soon as possible the unfortunate modifications, and by reprinting under the name of this Pontiff this new version with a preface where it would be explained that, in the first edition, because of the haste that had been brought, some errors were made through the fault either of printers or of other people. This is how I returned good for evil to Pope Sixtus. Sixtus, indeed, because of my thesis on the direct power of the Pope, had put my Controversies on the Index of Prohibited Books until after correction; but as soon as he died, the Sacred Congregation of Rites ordered my name to be removed from the Index. My advice pleased Pope Gregory. He created a Congregation to quickly revise the Sistine version and to bring it closer to the vulgates in circulation, in particular that of Leuven. [...] After the death of Gregory (XIV) and Innocent (V), Clement VIII edited this revised Bible, under the name of Sixtus (V), with the Preface of which I am the author. (in original Latin: Vita ven. Roberti cardinalis Bellarmini, pp. 30–31); (in French here, pp. 106–107)) It was issued containing the Papal bull Cum Sacrorum of 9 November 1592, which asserted that every subsequent edition must be assimilated to this one, that no word of the text may be changed and that variant readings may not be printed in the margin. Most of the misprints of this edition were removed in a second (1593) and a third (1598) edition.

The 1593 and 1598 editions were in quarto. The 1592 edition contained a list of quotations, an interpretation of names, and a Biblical concordance; those were not present in the 1593 and 1598 editions. The 1593 and 1598 editions contained references in the margin, and "various prefaces"; the 1592 edition did not.

This new official version of the Vulgate, known as the Clementine Vulgate, or Sixto-Clementine Vulgate, became the official Bible of the Catholic Church.

==== Textual characteristics ====
The Appendix to the Clementine Vulgate contained additional apocryphal books: Prayer of Manasseh, 3 Esdras, and 4 Esdras. Its version of the Book of Psalms was the Psalterium Gallicanum and not the versio juxta Hebraicum. The 1592 edition did not contain Jerome's prologues, but those prologues were present at the beginning of the volume of the 1593 and 1598 editions. The Clementine Vulgate contains texts of Acts 15:34 and the Johannine Comma. The new system of verse enumeration introduced by the Sixtine Vulgate was replaced by the system of division of verses enumeration of the 1551 edition of the Bible of Robertus Stephanus.

The text of the Clementine Vulgate was close to the Hentenian edition of the Bible, which is the Leuven Vulgate; this is a difference from the Sixtine edition, which had "a text more nearly resembling that of Robertus Stephanus than that of John Hentenius". The Clementine Vulgate used the verse enumeration system of Stephanus and the Leuven Vulgate. The text of the Sixtine Vulgate left an "eternal mark" in the details of the Sixto-Clementine Vulgate: in the latter's "spelling, especially that of the proper nouns, and in its corrections of details, even the less justified ones". The situation concerning the deeper modification Sixtus had made to the Leuven Vulgate text is totally different. The editors tried to make the Clementine Vulgate as similar as possible to the Sixtine Vulgate: titles and frontispieces were similar, and the page numbering of the Sixtine and Clementine editions was identical.

==== Title ====
Scrivener notes that to avoid the appearance of a conflict between the two popes, the Clementine Bible was published under the name of Sixtus, with a preface by Bellarmine. This preface asserted that Sixtus had intended to publish a new edition due to errors that had occurred in the printing of the first, but had been prevented from doing this by his death, and that now, in accordance with his desire, the work was completed by his successor.

The full name of the Clementine Vulgate was Biblia sacra Vulgatae Editionis, Sixti Quinti Pont. Max. iussu recognita atque edita (translation: The Holy Bible of the Common/Vulgate Edition identified and published by the order of Pope Sixtus V). Because the Clementine edition retained the name of Sixtus on its title page, the Clementine Vulgate is sometimes known as the Sixto-Clementine Vulgate.

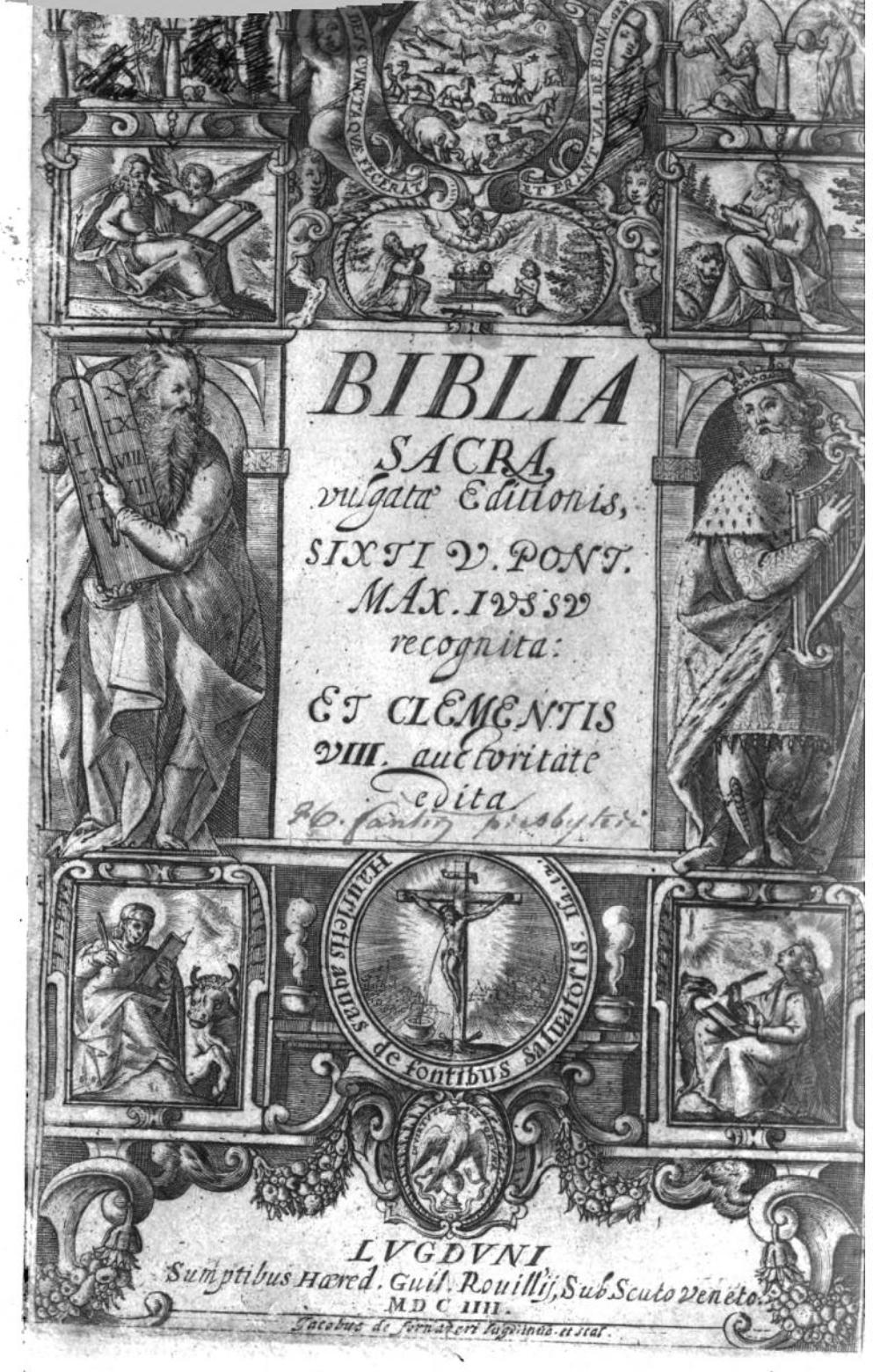
1604 edition of the Clementine Vulgate from Rouillé's press, with Clement VIII and Sixtus V named

E. Nestle notes that "the first edition to contain the names of both the Popes [Sixtus V and Clement VIII] upon the title page is that of 1604. The title runs: 'Sixti V. Pont. Max. iussu recognita et Clementis VIII. auctoritate edita.'" An analysis also shared by Scrivener and Hastings. Hastings adds that "[t]he regular form of title in a modern Vulgate Bible – 'Biblia Sacra Vulgatae Editionis Sixti V. Pont. Max. jussu recognita et Clementis VIII. auctoritate edita'" cannot be traced earlier than 1604. Up until that time Sixtus was the only one mentioned on the title page; after this date, "Clement occasionally figures by himself". This addition of Clement VIII on the title page in 1604 is due to the printing press of Guillaume Rouillé.

== Differences from the Sixtine Vulgate ==
The Clementine edition of the Vulgate differs from the Sixtine edition in about 3,000 places according to Carlo Vercellone, James Hastings, Eberhard Nestle, F. G. Kenyon, the Oxford Dictionary of the Christian Church, and Bruce M. Metzger; 4,900 according to Michael Hetzenauer, and Bruce M. Metzger & Bart D. Ehrman in their co-written book; and "roughly five thousand" according to Kurt and Barbara Aland.

Some examples of text changes include, for example in Exodus 2, where the text of the Sixtine Vulgate "constituit te" (2:14), "venerant" (2:16), "et eripuit" (2:22), and "liberavit" (2:25) is replaced in the Clementine Vulgate respectively by "te constituit", "venerunt", "eripuit", and "cognovit".

== Criticism ==
Research later made after the printing of the Clementine Vulgate "has shown that the Clementine edition departs at many points from Jerome's text [the Vulgate]".

=== Contemporary critiques ===
The differences between the Sixtine and Clementine editions of the Vulgate have been criticised by Protestants; Thomas James in his Bellum Papale sive Concordia discors (London, 1600) "upbraids the two Popes on their high pretensions and the palpable failure of at least one, possibly both of them". He gave a long list of about 2,000 differences between these two editions. In the preface to the first edition of the King James Version (1611), translators accused the pope of perversion of the Holy Scripture.

=== Modern critiques ===
James Hastings said he "willingly admit[s]" that "on the whole [...] the Clementine text is critically an improvement upon the Sixtine". According to Frederic G. Kenyon, "[i]t cannot be pretended that the Clementine text is satisfactory from the point of view of history or scholarship"; he also said the changes that differentiate the Clementine edition from the Sixtine edition "except where they simply remove an obvious blunder, are, for the most part, no improvement". Henri Quentin wrote: "Overall, the Clementine edition is a little better than the Sixtine, but it does not mark considerable progress".

On the contrary, G. Mallows Youngman says that "There is no doubt that the Clementine Vulgate is a great improvement on the Sixtine".

Kurt and Barbara Aland wrote that "neither the edition of 1590 nor that of 1592 [...] succeeded in representing either Jerome's original text [...] or its Greek base with any accuracy". Monsignor Roger Gryson, a patristics scholar at the Catholic University of Louvain, asserts in the preface to the 4th edition of the Stuttgart Vulgate (1994) that the Clementine edition "frequently deviates from the manuscript tradition for literary or doctrinal reasons, and offers only a faint reflection of the original Vulgate, as read in the pandecta of the first millennium". By the same token however, the great extent to which the Clementine edition preserves contaminated readings from the medieval period can itself be considered to have critical value; Frans Van Liere states: "for the medieval student interested in the text as it was read, for instance, in thirteenth century Paris, the Sixto-Clementine Vulgate might actually be a better representative of the scholastic biblical text than the modern critical editions of the text in its pre-Carolingian form". Houghton states that "[t]he Clementine Vulgate is often a better guide to the text of the mediaeval Vulgate than critical editions of the earliest attainable text".

== Later printings ==
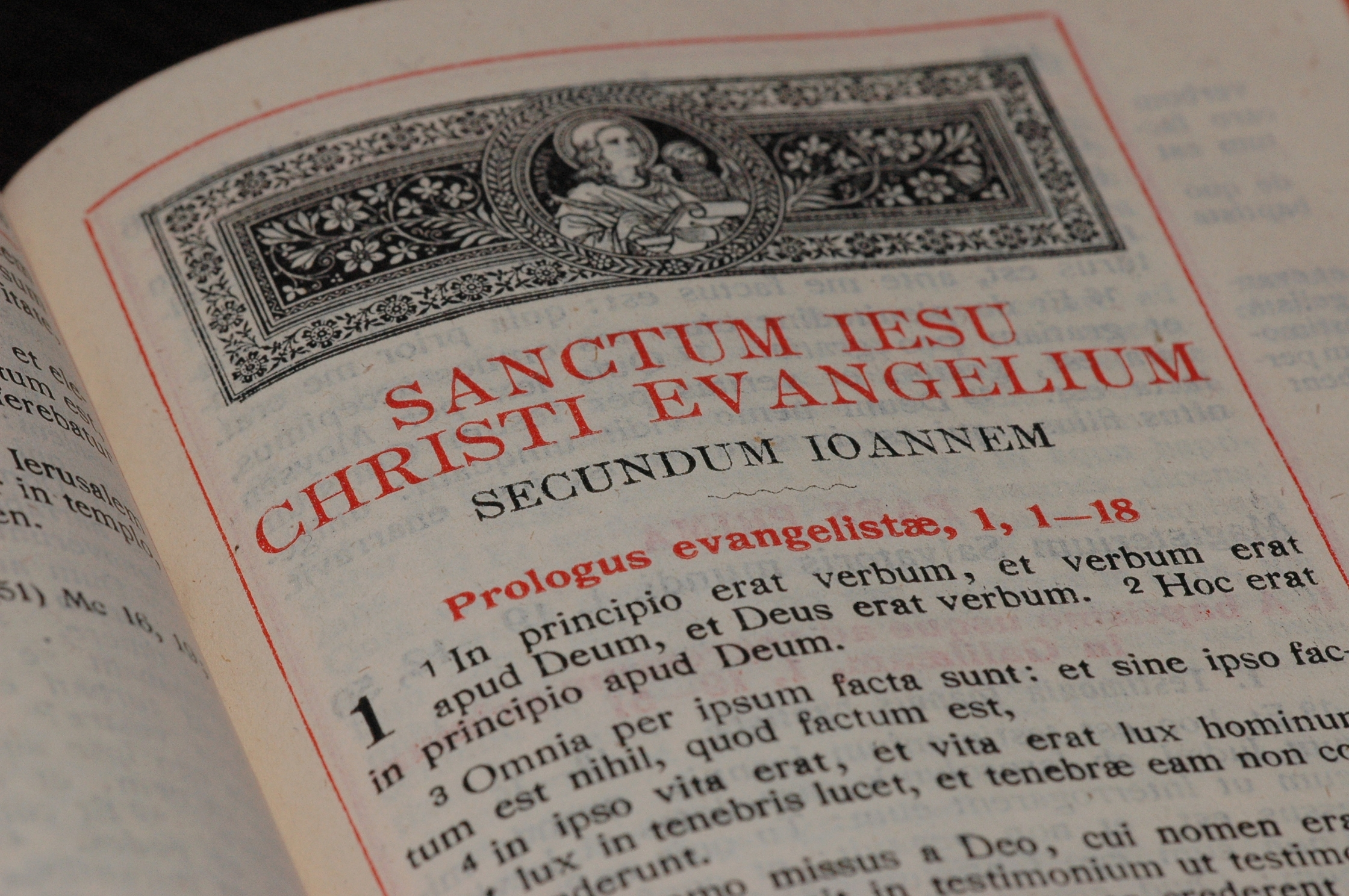
Prologue to the Gospel of John, Sixto-Clementine Vulgate, 1922 edition by Hetzenauer

There is not an accessible official version of the Vulgate that corresponds to the authorized Sixtine or Clementine edition of the Holy Scriptures. Although the Council of Trent ordered the publication of an authentic Vulgate text, and this directive was fulfilled by both Sixtus V and Clement VIII, copies of these editions are extremely rare. Since then, no officially authorized Jerome's Vulgate has been printed by the Vatican Press (not taking into consideration the Nova Vulgata).

The various Vulgate editions currently in circulation are produced by private editors with their bishops' approval, drawn from one or another of the three editions by Clement VIII. However, these versions are not free from errors and do not consistently follow the authorized text in terms of spelling or punctuation.

Dr. Michael Hetzenauer, professor of biblical exegesis in the Roman Seminary of St. Anollinaris, has edited in 1906 a new edition of the Clementine Vulgate (Biblia sacra vulgatae editionis: ex ipsis exemplaribus vaticanis inter se atque cum indice errorum corrigendorum collatis critice); his edition was based on the 1592, 1593, and 1598 printings of the Clementine Vulgate, and included authorized corrections.

The 1946 edition by Alberto Colunga Cueto and Turrado is the current standard reference edition of the Clementine Vulgate, and a version of it is available online. (Note: Here (reference given in the source by Houghton).)

== In critical editions of the Bible text ==
The 1592 edition of the Clementine Vulgate is cited in the Nestle-Aland, where it is designated by the siglum vg^{cl}, and in the Oxford Vulgate New Testament (also known as the Oxford Vulgate), where it is designated by the siglum C. The 1592, 1593 and 1598 editions are cited in the Stuttgart Vulgate, where they are collectively designated by the siglum 𝔠.

== Nova Vulgata ==
The Clementine Vulgate remained the standard Bible of the Roman Catholic Church until 1979, when the Nova Vulgata, a new translation of the Bible to Latin, was promulgated by Pope John Paul II.

== See also ==
- Bible translations into Latin
- Douay–Rheims Bible
- Latin Psalters
- Vulgate
- Sixtine Vulgate
- Nova Vulgata

== Works cited ==
- James, Thomas (1843) [1612]. Edmund Cox, John (ed.). A Treatise of the Corruptions of Scripture, Councils, and Fathers, by the Prelates, Pastors, and pillars of the Church of Rome for the maintenance of Popery. New York Public Library (3rd ed.). J. W. Parker.
- Scrivener, Frederick Henry Ambrose (1894). "Chapter III. Latin versions". In Miller, Edward (ed.). A Plain Introduction to the Criticism of the New Testament. Vol. 2 (4th ed.). London: George Bell & Sons.
- Quentin, Henri (1922). Mémoire sur l'établissement du texte de la Vulgate (in French). Kelly – University of Toronto. Rome: Desclée.
- Metzger, Bruce M. (1977). "VII The Latin Versions". The Early Versions of the New Testament. Oxford: Clarendon Press.
- Steinmeuller, John E. (December 1938). "The History of the Latin Vulgate". Homiletic & Pastoral Review. Joseph F. Wagner, Inc.: 252–257 – via CatholicCulture.
- Gerace, Antonio (2016). "Francis Lucas 'of Bruges' and Textual Criticism of the Vulgate before and after the Sixto-Clementine (1592)". Journal of Early Modern Christianity. 3 (2): 201–237. doi:10.1515/jemc-2016-0008. S2CID 193547960 – via KULeuven.
- Houghton, H. A. G. (2016). "Editions and Resources". The Latin New Testament: A Guide to Its Early History, Texts, and Manuscripts. Oxford University Press. ISBN 9780198744733.
