= Morinus =

Morinus may refer to:

- Jean-Baptiste Morin (mathematician), French mathematician and astrologer
- Jean Morin (theologian) (1591–1659), French theologian
- Petrus Morinus (1531–1608), French biblical scholar
