= Franciscus Lucas Brugensis =

Roman Catholic biblical exegete and textual critic from the Habsburg Netherlands

François Luc de Bruges
- Born: 1548/1549; Bruges, Habsburg Netherlands
- Died: 1619
- Resting place: Saint-Omer Cathedral, France
- Other names: Franciscus Lucas, François Lucas, Francis Lucas
- Occupations: Biblical exegete and textual critic
- Notable work: 1574 and 1583 editions of the Leuven Vulgate
- Parent(s): Josse Lucas and Ghislaine Vande Walle

Franciscus Lucas Brugensis or François Luc de Bruges (1548/49–1619) was a Roman Catholic biblical exegete and textual critic from the Habsburg Netherlands.

== Life ==
=== Early life ===
Franciscus Lucas was born in Bruges late in 1548 or early in 1549, the son of Josse Lucas and Ghislaine Vande Walle. He studied at Castle College, Leuven, for his B.A., graduating on 6 March 1568, placing fifth of the 155 students in his year. He went on to earn a Licentiate of Sacred Theology in 1575 or 1576. Alongside his academic studies, he applied himself to acquiring a knowledge of Middle Eastern languages under the guidance of the Jesuit scholar Johannes Harlemius. He also became a friend of William Damasus Lindanus and Robert Bellarmine, and of the family of Christopher Plantin.

=== Editions of the Leuven Vulgate ===
In 1570, Christopher Plantin obtained permission to print a new edition of the Leuven Vulgate, first edited by Hentenius, revised under the authority of the Leuven Faculty of Theology. A committee consisting of Joannes Molanus, Augustinus Hunnaeus and Cornelis Reineri appointed Franciscus Lucas to gather any variant readings that Hentenius had missed and to add explanatory marginal notes. Lucas spent three years on this task. Plantin published this second edition of the Leuven Vulgate in Antwerp in 1574 under the title Biblia sacra. Quid in hac editione a theologie Lovaniensibus praestitum sit, paulo post indicatur.

While working on a companion volume of notes providing fuller explanations of his choice of readings than had been possible in the biblical edition itself, Lucas twice travelled to his native Bruges, where Remi Drieux ordained him to the diaconate in June 1574 and to the priesthood in April 1577. His scholarly work was further delayed by the Dutch Revolt. On 2 February 1578 Scottish mercenaries in the service of William the Silent took control of Leuven and the university effectively ceased to function. Lucas returned to his parental home in Bruges, but on 20 March this town too fell to the rebels. In 1580, Plantin published Lucas's Notationes in sacra Biblia quibus variantia discrepantibus exemplaribus loca summo studio discutiuntur, with a dedication to Cardinal Sirleto, and in 1583 Plantin republished the 1574 Bible and the 1580 annotations together in a single folio volume. This edition bore the title: Biblia Sacra, quid in hac editione a theologis Lovaniensibus praestitum sit, eorum praefatio indicat.

=== Ecclesiastical career ===
Lucas had been appointed to a canonry of the collegiate church of St Salvator, Bruges, on 6 May 1579, but in July 1581, Jean Six, newly consecrated as bishop of Saint-Omer, took him into service as his private chaplain and secretary. Lucas held this position until Six's death on 11 October 1586, but from 2 October 1581 he also held an appointment from the cathedral chapter in Saint-Omer to provide lectures on Sacred Scripture, and from 2 April 1584 he held a prebend in the chapter reserved to theology graduates.

In September 1586, while travelling to a provincial synod in Mons, Bishop Six fell ill at Lille. Lucas took down his last requests, acted as one of his executors, and personally transported his heart back to Saint-Omer for burial there. His eulogy of the bishop was printed at the Plantin Press in 1587 as In obitum D. Joannis Six, episcopi audomaropoliiani, oratio funebris Francisci Lucae, S.T.L. canonici audomaropolitani.

On 5 March 1593, Lucas was appointed canon penitentiary, and on 31 July 1602 he was elected dean of the chapter (taking possession of the office on 6 August). His name was put forward to succeed Petrus Simons as bishop of Ypres, but Charles Maes was appointed to the see.

=== Later works ===
In 1603 Plantin's successor, Jan Moretus, published Lucas's overview of the corrections of the Sixto-Clementine Vulgate as Romanae correctionis in latinis Bibliis editionis vulgata, jussu Sixti V pont. max. recognitis, loca insigniora, with a dedication to Jacques Blaseus, bishop of Saint-Omer and laudatory approbations by Professor Estius, Cardinal Baronius and Cardinal Bellarmine.

In 1606 a two-volume exegetical commentary on the Gospels on which he had long been engaged was finally published, again by Moretus, as In sacrosancta quatuor Jesu Christi Evangelia commentarii, with a dedication to the Sovereign Archdukes Albert and Isabella.

The Concordantiae Bibliorum Sacrorum Vulgatae Editionis is an important biblical concordance compiled by Franciscus Lucas Brugensis. The work was first published in 1617 by the Officina Plantiniana in Antwerp. Its purpose was to improve and correct earlier concordances based on the Latin Vulgate.

=== Death ===
After the death of Bishop Blaseus on 22 March 1618, Lucas was appointed capitular vicar during the ensuing vacancy, but he himself died on 19 February 1619. Among other bequests, he left instructions to his executors to present forty parishes each with one copy of the folio Plantin edition of the Roman Missal with copper plate engravings. He was buried next to his sister, Denise, in the nave of Saint-Omer Cathedral, opposite the chapel of St Denis where he had frequently said Mass.
