= Johannes Harlemius =

Johan Willemsz, latinized Johannes Harlemius (1538–1578), was a Dutch Jesuit and Hebraist from Haarlem who taught at the Jesuit house of studies in Leuven. He briefly taught Hebrew at the Collegium Trilingue (1567–1568). An expert on the Old Testament, he advised on both the Plantin Polyglot (1573) and Lucas Brugensis's revision of the Leuven Vulgate (1574).
