= François Lucas =

François Lucas is the name of:

- François Lucas de Bruges (1548/9–1619), Roman Catholic biblical exegete and textual critic from the Habsburg Netherlands.
- François Édouard Anatole Lucas (4 April 1842 – 3 October 1891), a French mathematician.
