= Francisco de Toledo (Jesuit) =

Catholic cardinal (1532–1596)

His Eminence Francisco de Toledo S.J.
- Cardinal-Priest of Santa Maria in Traspontina
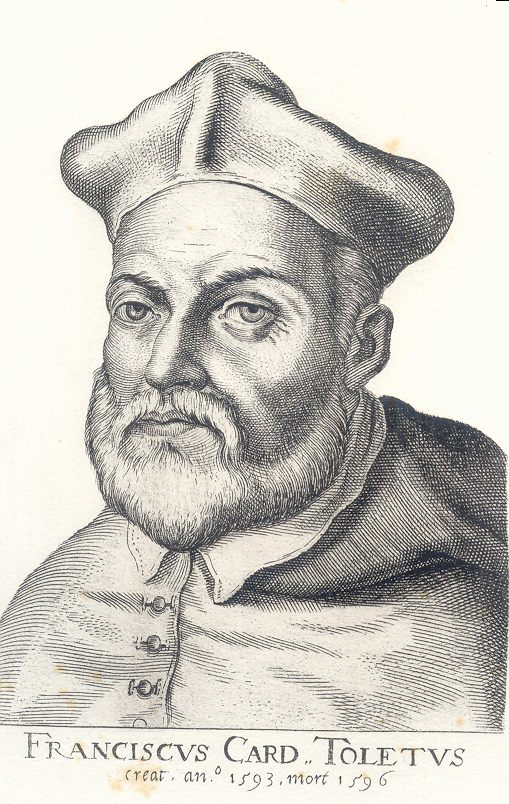

Orders
- Created cardinal: 17 September 1593 by Clement VIII

Personal details
- Born: 4 October 1532 Cordoba, Castille
- Died: 14 September 1596 (aged 63) Rome, Papal States
- Coat of arms

Francisco de Toledo (4 October 1532 in Cordoba (Castille) – 14 September 1596 in Rome) was a Spanish Jesuit priest and theologian, Biblical exegete and professor at the Roman College. He is the first Jesuit to have been made a cardinal (in 1593).

== Biography ==
After studying under Domingo de Soto, Toledo became a professor of philosophy at the University of Salamanca from 1555 to 1559.

He was ordained priest at Salamanca in 1556 and two years later, in 1558, entered the Jesuit order. After a brief period of spiritual formation he was called to Rome by the Superior General, Diego Láynez, where the budding Roman College was in great need of professors. Toledo successively (and successfully) taught Philosophy (1559-1562), Scholastic and Moral Theology (1562-1569), and was prefect of studies of the fast-growing university.

In the 1570s he published a number of commentaries on Aristotle's works.

He directed the work on the Clementine Vulgate, the revision of the Latin Vulgate that was published in 1598; this built on the Sistine Vulgate (the 1590 text), approved by Pope Sixtus V.

He died in 1596 and was buried in the Santa Maria Maggiore. The tomb monument was created in 1598 by the Flemish sculptor Gillis van den Vliete after a design by Giacomo della Porta.

== Works ==
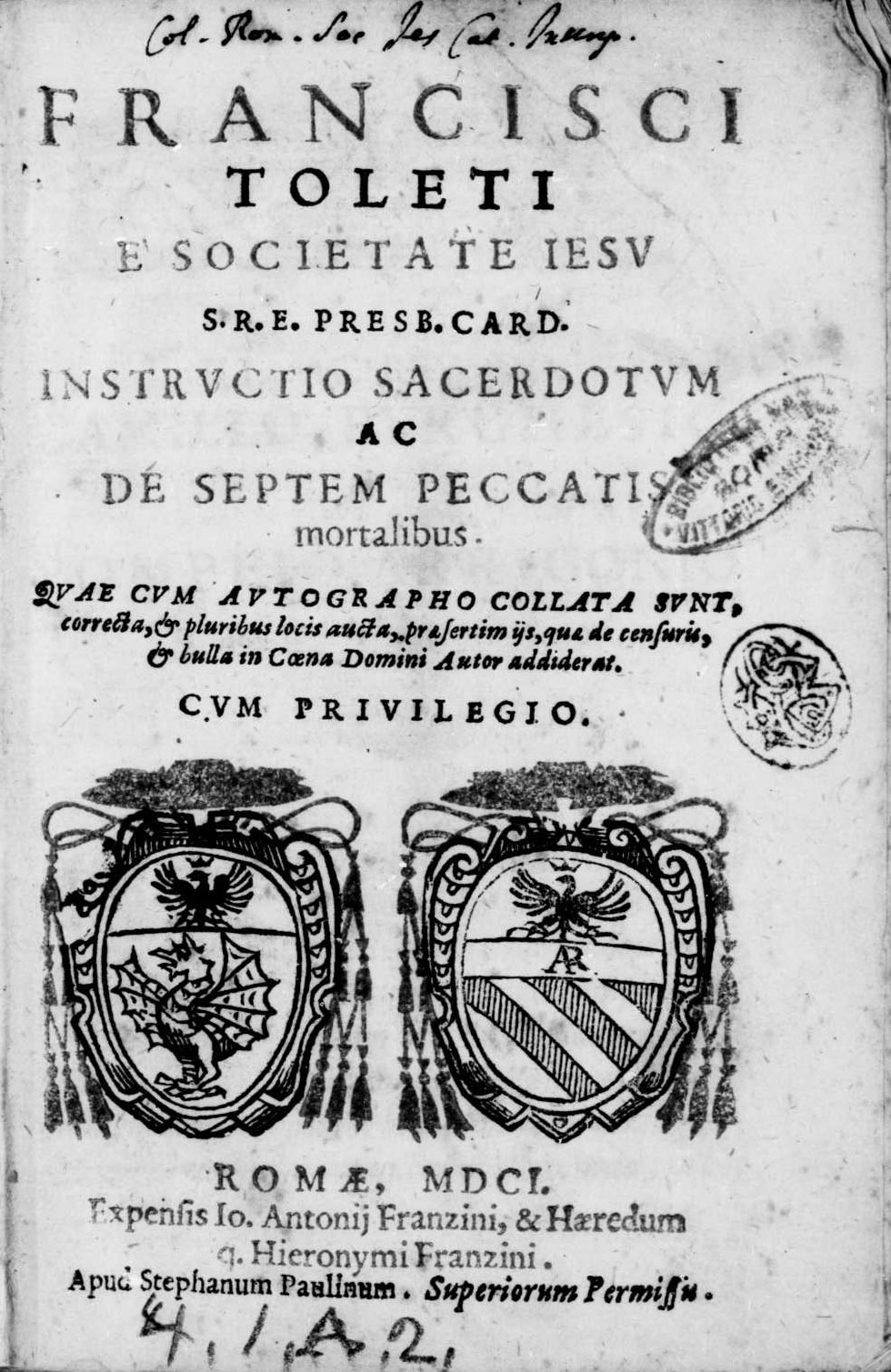
Instructio sacerdotum ac poenitentium, 1601

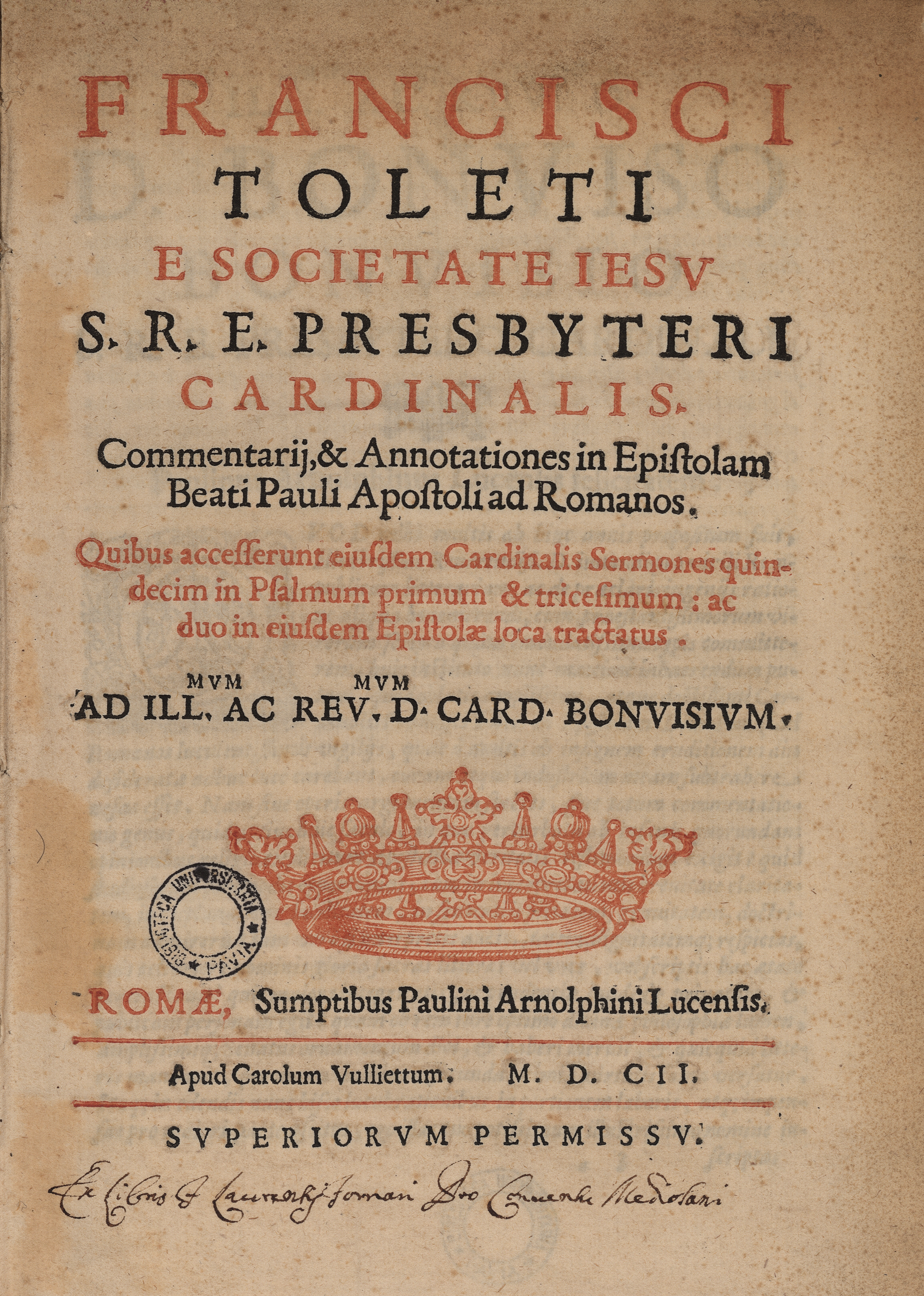
Commentarii et annotationes in Epistolam Beati Pauli apostoli ad Romanos, 1602

The 1913 Catholic Encyclopedia organizes Toledo's works into three classes: the philosophical, the theological, and the exegetical.

=== Philosophical works ===
- Introductio in dialecticam Aristotelis (Rome, 1561), thirteen editions, apparently the first work of a Jesuit to be printed in Mexico
- Commentaria una cum quæstionibus in universam Aristotelis logicam (Rome, 1572), seventeen editions
- Commentaria de physica auscultatione (Venice, 1573), fifteen editions
- De generatione et corruptione (Venice, 1575), seven editions
- De anima (Venice, 1574), twenty editions
- Opera omnia. Opera philosophica (Lyons, 1586–92), only one volume issued

=== Theological works ===
- In Summam theologiæ S. Thomæ Aquinatis enarratio (4 vols., Rome, 1869), published by José Paría, S.J.
- Summa casuum sive instructio sacerdotum (Lyons, 1599), forty-six editions (Spanish tr., Juan de Salas; Italian, Andreo Verna; French, Goffar; summaries in Latin, Spanish, French, and Italian)

=== Exegetical works ===
- In sacrosanctum Joannis Evangelium commentarium (Rome, 1592), nine editions
- Commentarii in prima XII capita sacrosancti Iesu Christi D.N. Evangelii secundum Lucam (in Latin). Romae: Giovanni Antonio Franzini, Girolamo eredi Franzini, Luigi Zanetti. 1600.
- Commentarii et annotationes in Epistolam Beati Pauli apostoli ad Romanos (in Latin). Romae: Paolino Arnolfini. 1602.

=== Other works ===
- Emmendationes in Sacra Biblia vulgata, manuscript, corrected by direction of Clement VIII
- Regulæ hebraicæ pro lingua sancta intelligenda, manuscript
- Motivós y advertencias de casas dignas de refomación cerca del Breviario, sermons
