= Bible translations into Latin =

The Bible translations into Latin date back to classical antiquity.

Latin translations of the Bible were used in the Western part of the former Roman Empire until the Reformation. Those translations are still used along with translations from Latin into the vernacular within the Roman Catholic Church.

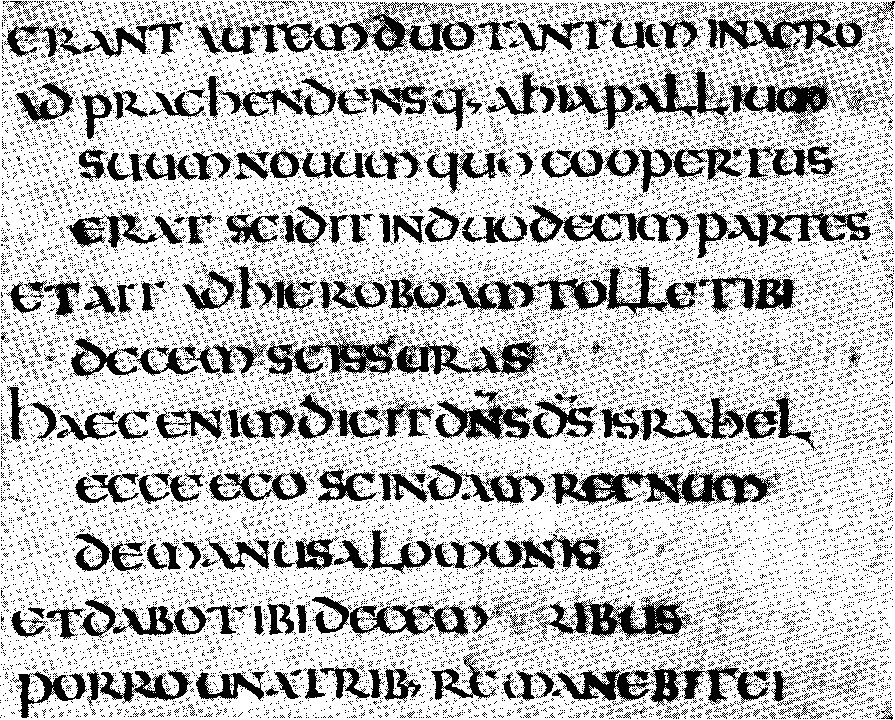
Part of a page of a 9th-century Biblia Vulgata, British Library, Add. Ms. 37777

== Pre-Christian Latin translations ==
The large Jewish diaspora in the Second Temple period made use of vernacular translations of the Hebrew Bible, including the Aramaic Targum and Greek Septuagint. Though there is no certain evidence of a pre-Christian Latin translation of the Hebrew Bible, some scholars have suggested that Jewish congregations in Rome and the Western part of the Roman Empire may have used Latin translations of fragments of the Hebrew Bible.

== Early Christian and medieval Latin translations ==
Unlike the Vulgate, the Vetus Latina tradition reflects numerous distinct, similar, and not entirely independent translations of various New Testament texts, extending back to the time of the original Greek autographs.

In 382 CE, Jerome began a revision of the existing Vetus Latina Gospels into contemporary Latin, corrected against manuscripts in the original Greek. Acts, Pauline epistles, Catholic epistles and the Apocalypse are Vetus Latina considered as being made by Pelagian groups or by Rufinus the Syrian. Those texts and others are known as the Vulgate, a compound text that is not entirely Jerome's work.

=== The Vetus Latina, "Old Latin" ===
The earliest known translations into Latin consist of a number of piecework translations during the early Church period. Collectively, these versions are known as the Vetus Latina and closely follow the Greek Septuagint. The Septuagint was the usual source for these anonymous translators, and they reproduce its variations from the Hebrew Masoretic Text. They were never rendered independently from the Hebrew or Greek; they vary widely in readability and quality, and contain many solecisms in idiom, some by the translators themselves, others from literally translating Greek language idioms into Latin.

=== The Biblia Vulgata, "Common Bible" ===
Earlier translations were progressively replaced by Jerome's Vulgate version of the Bible.

Apart from full Old Testaments, there are more versions of the Psalms only, three of them by Jerome, one from the Hexapla, and one from the Hebrew. Other main versions include the Versio ambrosiana ("Ambrosian version") and the Versio Piana ("version of Pius" ). See this article for a comparison of Psalm 94.

== Early modern Latin versions ==
Some printed Latin translations were produced by early 16th-century scholars such as Erasmus, derived from his Greek printed version, the Novum Instrumentum omne, the first published example of the Textus Receptus. The Complutensian Polyglot Bible followed shortly after.

In 1527, Xanthus Pagninus produced his Veteris et Novi Testamenti nova translatio, notable for its literal rendering of the Hebrew. This version was also the first to introduce verse numbers in the New Testament, although the system used here did not become widely adopted; the system used in Robertus Stephanus's Vulgate would later become the standard for dividing the New Testament.

Together with John Hesronita and Victor Sciala, Gabriel Sionita published a Latin translation of the (Arabic) Psalter in 1614. (Liber Psalmorum Dauidis Regis et Prophetae ex Arabico idiomate in Latinum translatus, 1614).

=== Reformation-era Protestant Latin translations ===
During the Protestant Reformation, several new Latin translations were produced:

- Sebastian Münster produced a new Latin version of the Old Testament, and gave an impetus to Old Testament study at the time.
- Theodore Beza prepared a Latin translation for his new edition of the Greek New Testament.
- Sebastian Castellio produced a version in elegant Ciceronian Latin. It was published in 1551.
- Immanuel Tremellius, together with Franciscus Junius (the elder), published a Latin version of the Old Testament (complete with the deuterocanonical books), which became famous among Protestants. Later editions of their version were accompanied by the Latin version of the Greek New Testament by Beza, and influenced the KJV translators.
- Sebastian Schmidt, a Lutheran Pastor, translated the whole Bible from Hebrew and Greek into Latin. (Biblia sacra, sive Testamentum Vetus et Novum ex linguis originalibus in linguam Latinam translatum, additis capitum summariis et partitionibus, a Sebastiano Schmidt).

=== Sixto-Clementine Vulgate ===
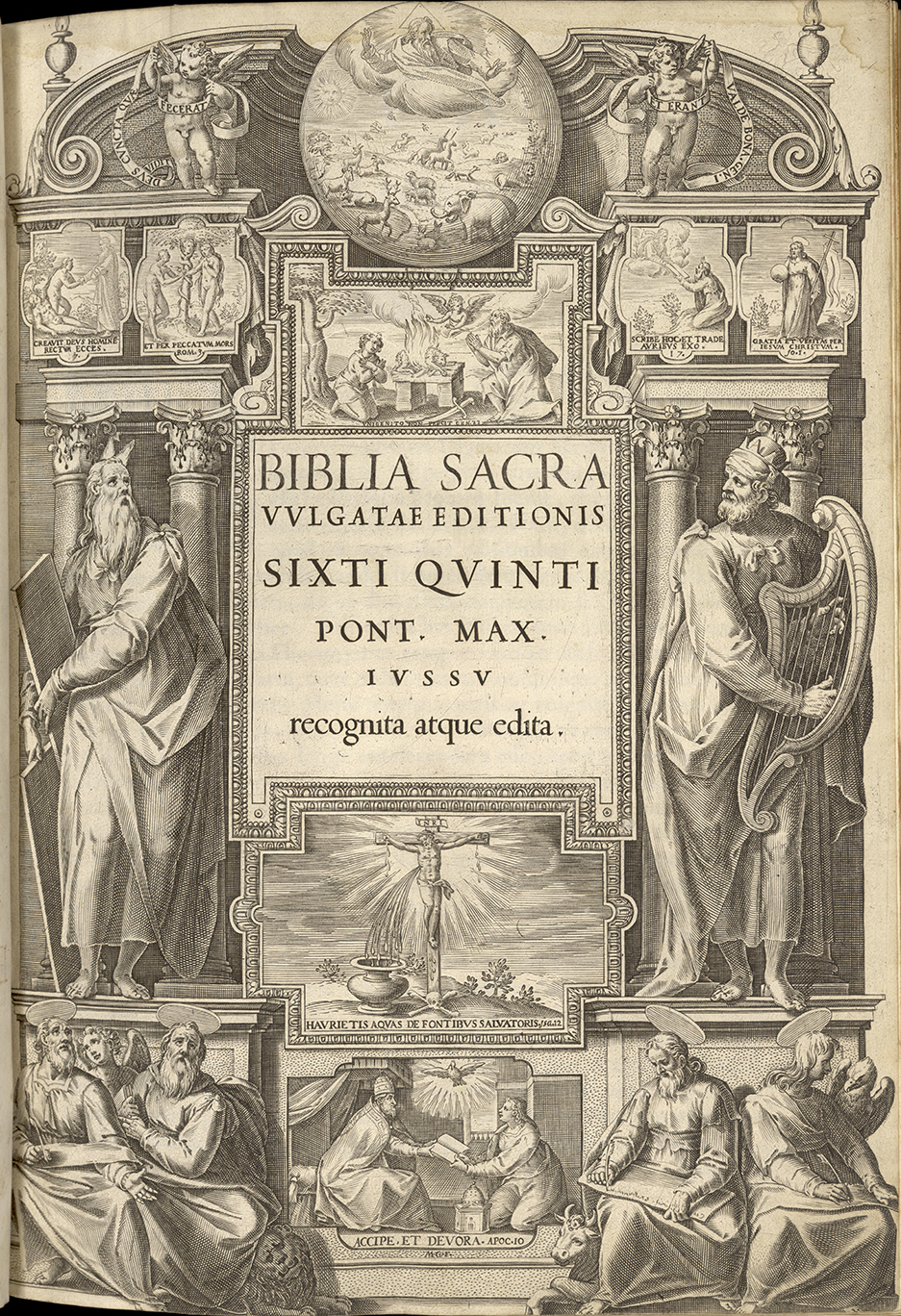
Frontispiece of the Sixto-Clementine Vulgate (1592).

The Sixto-Clementine Vulgate or Clementine Vulgate (Latin: Vulgata Clementina) is an edition of the Latin Vulgate, the official Bible of the Roman Catholic Church. It was the second edition of the Vulgate to be formally authorized by the Catholic Church, the first being the Sixtine Vulgate. The Clementine Vulgate was promulgated in 1592 by Pope Clement VIII, hence its name. The Sixto-Clementine Vulgate was used officially in the Catholic Church until 1979, when the Nova Vulgata was promulgated by Pope John Paul II. The Clementine Vulgate is still in use in the 1962 missal and breviary of the Catholic Church.

The Sixto-Clementine Vulgate is a revision of the Sixtine Vulgate; the latter had been published two years earlier under Sixtus V. Nine days after the death of Sixtus V, who had issued the Sixtine Vulgate, the College of Cardinals suspended the sale of the Sixtine Vulgate and later ordered the destruction of the copies. Thereafter, two commissions under Gregory XIV were in charge of the revision of the Sixtine Vulgate. In 1592, Clement VIII, arguing printing errors in the Sixtine Vulgate, recalled all copies of the Sixtine Vulgate still in circulation; some suspect his decision was in fact due to the influence of the Jesuits. In the same year, a revised edition of the Sixtine Vulgate was published and promulgated by Clement VIII; this edition is known as the Sixto-Clementine Vulgate, or Clementine Vulgate.

=== Metrical translations of the Psalms (16th cen.) ===
Metrical Latin Bible translations are primarily Psalm paraphrases, or paraphrases of Song of Songs, Lamentations, in Latin verse which appeared in the 16th century, then abruptly disappeared.

== Nova Vulgata ==
In 1907 Pope Pius X proposed that the Latin text of the Vulgate be recovered using the principles of textual criticism as a basis for a new official translation of the Bible into Latin. This revision ultimately led to the Nova Vulgata issued by Pope John Paul II in 1979.
