= Joannes Molanus =

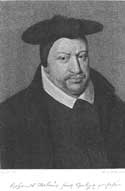
Molanus, a portrait destroyed by German military action in 1915

Joannes Molanus (1533–1585), often cited simply as Molanus, is the Latinized name of Jan Vermeulen or Van der Meulen, an influential Counter Reformation Catholic theologian of Louvain University, where he was Professor of Theology, and Rector from 1578. Born at Lille (a city in the County of Flanders, then under Habsburg rule), he was a priest and canon of St. Peter's Church, Leuven, where he died.

He wrote numerous books, several only published posthumously. He is best known for his De Picturis et Imaginibus Sacris, pro vero earum usu contra abusus ("Treatise on Sacred Images"). This was published in 1570, four years after the Iconoclastic Fury had swept through the Low Countries, and it defended the production and use of devotional images, but enforcing the restrictions of the Council of Trent, as he interpreted them, in a brutally polemical fashion, which was very influential. Five further, enlarged, editions of this appeared between 1594 and 1771, and a modern French translation was published in 1996. He was also lead editor of an edition of the works of Saint Augustine (Antwerp, Plantin Press, 1566–1577), and wrote a manuscript history of Louvain that was printed in two volumes in 1861, edited by P. F. X. de Ram.

== Life ==
Molanus was born in Lille, in Walloon Flanders, in 1533, the son of Hendrik Vermeulen and Anna Peters. His father was from Holland and his mother from Brabant.

He matriculated at Louvain University on 27 February 1554, graduating in the Liberal Arts in 1558 and as Doctor of Theology in 1570. He sat on the committee of theologians overseeing Lucas Brugensis's revision of the Leuven Vulgate, published in 1574. He became a canon of St. Peter's Church, Leuven, and a professor of Theology, serving both as dean of the Faculty of Theology and as rector of the university. In 1579 he was appointed president of King's College.

Molanus died in Louvain on 18 September 1585, having made bequests in favour of the college over which he had presided.

== Molanus and art ==
Molanus is today mainly remembered by art historians for being one of the first authorities to turn the Council of Trent's short and inexplicit decrees on sacred images (1563) into minutely detailed instructions for artists, which were then widely enforced in Catholic countries mostly. His views on the older, originally Byzantine, depiction of the Nativity of Jesus in art are typical:

The Virgin is shown pale with pains, the midwives prepare a small (narcotic) drought for the childbirth. Why this? Is it because the Virgin Mary would have held back from any pain of childbirth, when in fact she brought forth her divine son without pain? And what pertains to the midwives who are mentioned in the apocryphal Book of the Infancy? Jerome says: There was no midwife! No obtrusiveness of women intervened! She, the Virgin, was both mother and midwife! I saw in not a few places the picture of the blessed Virgin lying on a bed, depicting childbirth, and she was suffering pains from this birth, but that is not true. How stupid! Those artists ought to be laughed at who paint Mary in the very act of childbirth pains, accompanied with pain, midwife, bed, little knives (to cut the umbilical cord), with hot compresses, and many other appurtenances. ... Rather, those pictures should be promoted which show the birth of Christ in which the Blessed Virgin Mary with arms folded and on bended knee before her little son, as though he was just now brought forth into the light.

He objected on similar grounds to the Death of the Virgin, or depictions of her as swooning in scenes of Christ carrying the Cross, or at the foot of the Cross during the Crucifixion itself. He also opposed her being shown supplicating Christ for mankind in Last Judgement scenes. She would, he said, in fact be sitting alongside Christ in stern judgement:

Many painters show Mary and John the Baptist kneeling beside Our lord at the Last Judgment ... But we may not think that at that day the Virgin Mary will kneel for us before the Judge, baring her breast to intercede for sinners. Nor may we think that John the Baptist will fall upon his knees to beg mercy for mankind in the way the painters show. Rather, the blessed Virgin and St. John shall sit beside the supreme Judge as assessors. The mercy which is extended now will have no place then. There will only be strict justice at that day.

Also condemned were Saint Christopher as a giant carrying Christ (and as the protector of travellers), Saint George and the Dragon, the Holy Kinship, the unicorn hunt in the Hortus Conclusus and many other depictions not verifiable from reliable sources – the Golden Legend was, he said, in fact of "lead".

Nudity, even of the infant Jesus, was to be avoided as much as possible, and drapes must cover the genitals where it could not be. Whilst condemning older depictions without a scriptural basis, he was not hesitant in creating new ones based on his own interpretation. Saint Joseph should not be shown as the old, semi-comical figure of the Middle Ages, but as young, vigorous and firmly in control of the Holy Family. Mary Magdalene should not be shown as an over-dressed prostitute, and generally dress should be simple.

== Publications ==
- Usuardi martyrologium (Leuven, 1568) Available on Google Books
- De Picturis et Imaginibus Sacris (Leuven, 1570) Available on Google Books
  - Reworked as the posthumously published Historia Sanctarum Imaginum (Leuven, 1594) Available on Google Books
- Indiculus Sanctorum Belgii (Leuven, 1573) Available on Google Books
- De fide haereticis servanda libri tres (Cologne, 1584) Available on Google Books
- Theologiae Practicae Compendium (Cologne, 1585) Available on Google Books
- Liber de piis testamentis (Cologne, 1585) Available on Google Books
- De Canonicis libri tres (Cologne, 1587) Available on Google Books
- Militia sacra ducum et principum Brabantiae (Antwerp, 1592), edited by Henricus van Cuyck for posthumous publication; available on Google Books
- Natales sanctorum Belgii (Antwerp, 1595), edited by Henricus van Cuyck for posthumous publication; available on Google Books
- Idea togatæ constantiæ sive Francisci Tailleri Dvbliniensis prætoris in persecutione congressus, & religionis catholicae defensione interitus... Authore Ioanne Molano (Paris, 1629) Available on KU Leuven Special Collections
- Historiae Lovaniensium Libri XIV, edited from an unpublished autograph manuscript by P.F.X de Ram and published as Les Quatorze Livres sur l'Histoire de la Ville de Louvain, 2 vols. (Brussels, 1861) Available on Google Books: vol. 1, vol. 2
