= Nicolaus van Winghe =

Nicolaus van Winghe (c. 1495–1552) was a Catholic Bible translator from the Habsburg Netherlands.

== Life ==
Winghe was born to a prominent family in Leuven around 1495 and matriculated at the university there in 1511. In 1518 he entered Sint-Maartensdal Priory, the Leuven house of the Brethren of the Common Life, as a Master of Arts. He served as librarian, procurator, and subprior of the house. He was known for opposing the views of Erasmus, and had many friends in the Leuven Faculty of Theology, including Ruard Tapper. In 1548 he transferred to the cloister of Mishagen in Antwerp, to serve as rector and confessor, dying there on 28 December 1552.

== Works ==
Winghe translated the Bible into Dutch, on the basis of the Leuven Vulgate, as well as Thomas à Kempis's The Imitation of Christ (both published 1548). At the time of his death he was working on a translation of Josephus. He also translated some sermons of Richard of St Victor and produced an anthology from Hildegard of Bingen.
