= Augustinus Hunnaeus =

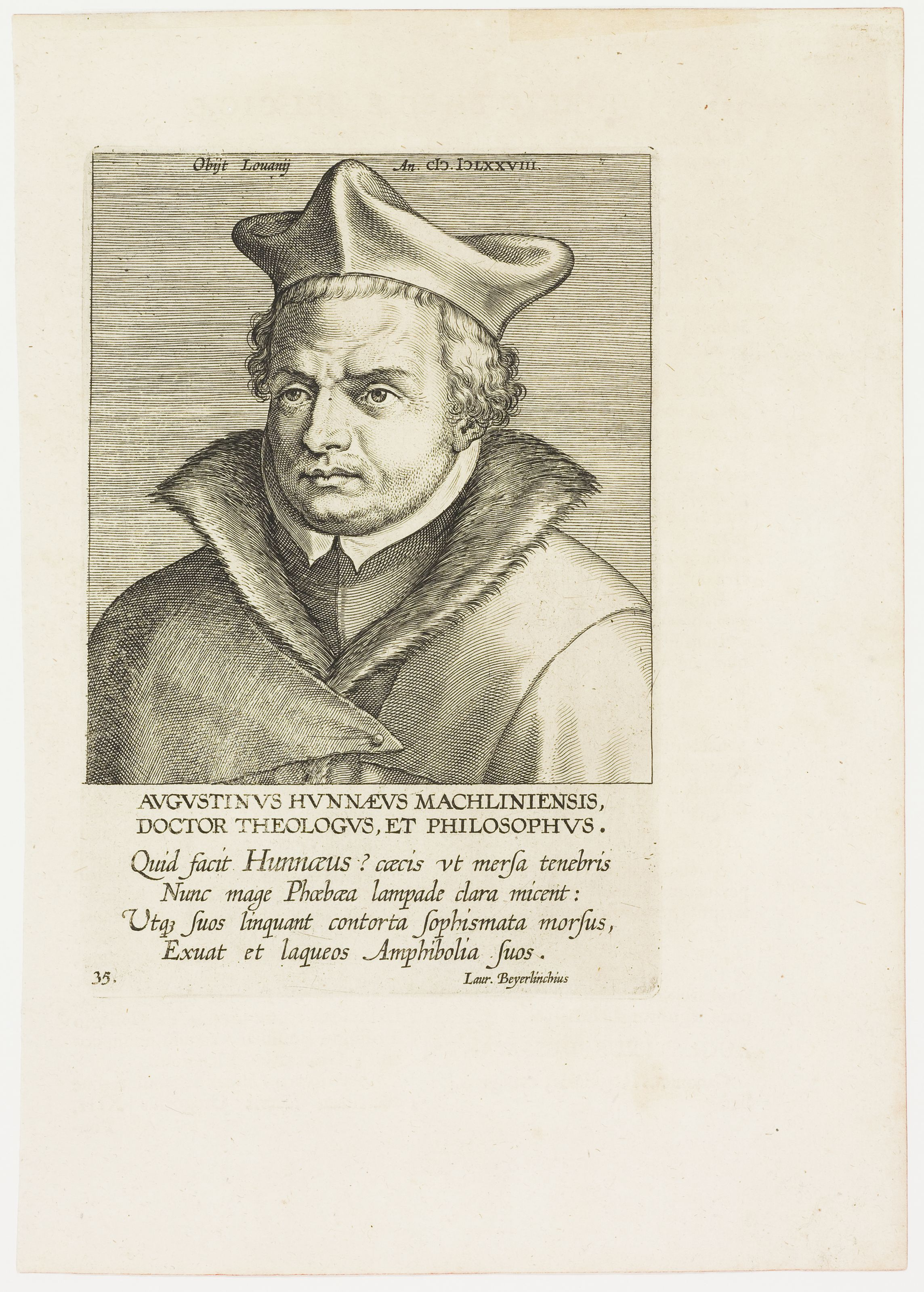
Augustinus Hunnaeus

Augustinus Hunnaeus (1521 – 1577 or 1578) was a Flemish Catholic theologian.

== Life ==
Hunnaeus was born in Mechelen in 1521. After attending school in his home city, Hunnaeus studied theology at University of Leuven, where he became Doctor of Philosophy. He taught Greek and Hebrew at the Gymnasium castrense of Leuven. He later became professor of theology at the local University.

Hunnaeus is one of the Syncretists of his time, whose work is based on Aristotle and Petrus Hispanus. He contributed to the Plantin Polyglot, a polyglot Bible printed by Christopher Plantin in Antwerp.

== Works ==
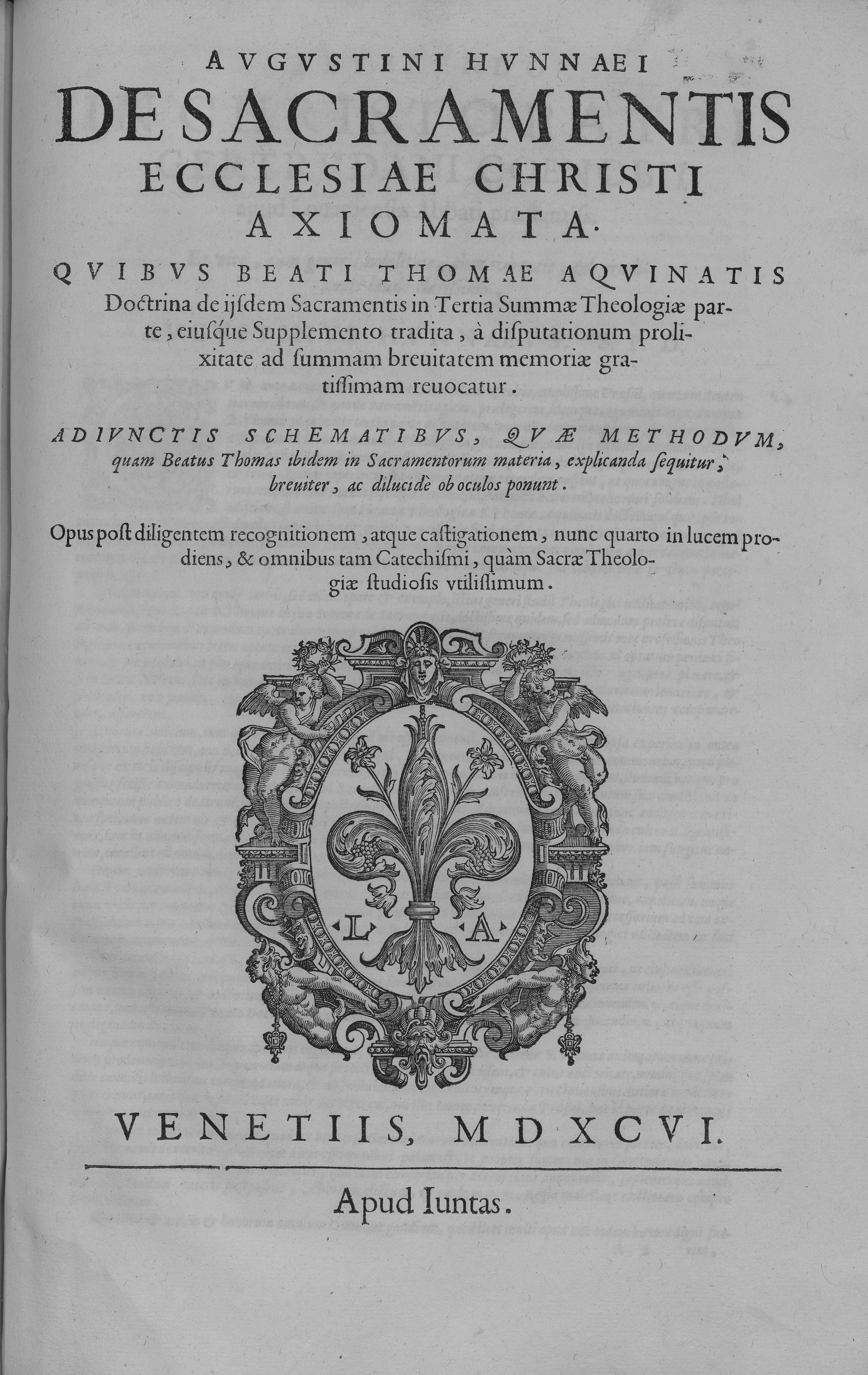
De sacramentis ecclesiae Christi axiomata, 1596

- De disputatione inter disceptantes, dialectice instituenda, libellus. Praeterea fundamentum logices, 1551
- Avgvstini Hvnaei Dialectica Sev, Generalia Logices praecepta omnia, quaecunq[ue] praecipuè ex toto Aristotelis organo, ad ediscendum proponi consueuerunt: Priùs quidem iuxta ueterem translationem impressa, nunc uerò ad Ioachimi Perionij & Nicolai Grouchij uersionem accomodata ..., 1552 and Antwerpen, Joachim Trognesius, 1608 available at KU Leuven Special Collections
- Ordo ac series quinque nouorum indicum generalium diu multum que hactenus a studiosis desideratorum et nunc magna accesione in singulis suis partibus locupletatorum, 1582
- Avg. Hvnnæi Catechismvs catholicvs, nvper vnico schemate comprehensus, atque ita in lucem editus: nvnc autem diligenter recognitus, & in libelli formam ad commodiorem iuuentutis vsum auctore eodem redactus. Antwerpen, Christoffel Plantijn, 1570 available at KU Leuven Special Collections.
- Hunnaeus, Augustinus (1596). De sacramentis ecclesiae Christi axiomata (in Latin). Venetiis: Francesco senese De Franceschi.
