= Disputationes de Controversiis =

16th-century work by Robert Bellarmine

Disputationes de Controversiis Christianae Fidei adversus hujus temporis Haereticos
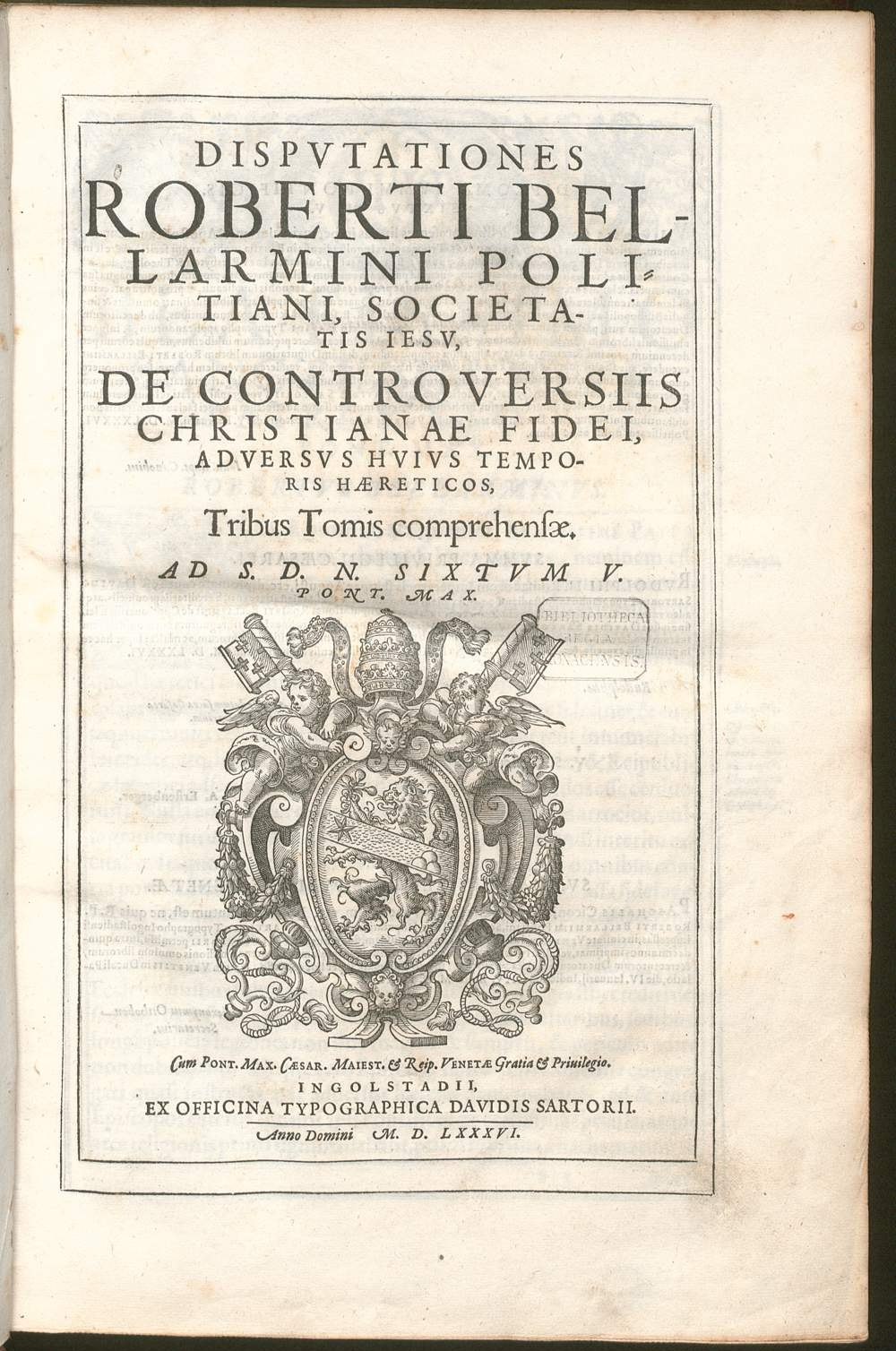
- Title page of the first volume, 1586
- Author: Robert Bellarmine
- Language: Latin
- Publication place: Ingolstadt, Duchy of Bavaria, Holy Roman Empire

Disputationes de Controversiis Christianae Fidei adversus hujus temporis Haereticos ('Disputations on the Controversies of the Christian Faith against the Heretics of this Time'), usually referred to as Disputationes, De Controversiis or Controversiae, is a work on dogmatics in three volumes by Robert Bellarmine.

The Disputationes has been described as "the definitive defence of papal power". After its publication, Bellarmine's Disputationes was regarded as the Catholic Church's foremost defence of its doctrine, and especially the papal power.

It was written while Bellarmine was lecturing at the Roman College, and was first published at Ingolstadt in three volumes (1586, 1588, 1593). This work was the earliest attempt to systematize the various controversies of the time, and made an immense impression throughout Europe, the strength of its arguments against Protestantism so acutely felt in Germany and England that special chairs were founded to provide replies to it. Thomas Hobbes, Theodore Beza, Conrad Vorstius and John Rainolds were among those who wrote counter-arguments against the work.

"The complete edition, reviewed and corrected by the author, which became the standard for all further editions, appeared in Venice in 1596."

== Content ==
The final edition of 1596 of the Controversiae contains a total of 17 controversies:

1. The Word of God
2. Christ
3. The Pope
4. Councils
5. The Members of the Church
6. The Church Suffering
7. The Church Triumphant
8. The Sacraments in General
9. Baptism and Confirmation
10. The Sacrament of Eucharist
11. Penance
12. Extreme Unction, Orders, and Matrimony
13. The Grace of the First Man
14. The Loss of Grace
15. Grace and Free Choice
16. Justification
17. Good Works

=== Content of the original three volumes ===
==== Volume I ====
The first volume treats of the Holy Scriptures and the Pope.

The third section discusses the Antichrist. Bellarmine gives in full the theory set forth by the Church Fathers, of a personal Antichrist to come just before the end of the world and to be accepted by the Jews and enthroned in the temple at Jerusalem—thus endeavoring to dispose of the Protestant exposition which saw in the pope the Antichrist.

The most important part of the work is contained in the five books regarding the pope. In these, after a speculative introduction on forms of government in general, holding monarchy to be relatively the best, Bellarmine says that a monarchical government and the related temporal power are necessary for the Church to preserve unity and order.

Such power, Bellarmine was considered to have been established by the commission of Christ to Saint Peter. He then proceeds to demonstrate that this power has been transmitted to the successors of Peter, admitting that a heretical pope may be freely judged and deposed by the Church since, by the very fact of his heresy, he would cease to be pope, or even a member of the Church. The fourth section sets forth the Pope as the supreme judge in matters of faith and morals, though making the concessions that the Pope may err in questions of fact known by ordinary human knowledge and when he speaks as a mere unofficial theologian.

==== Volume II ====
The second volume is about the authority of councils and the Church, whether militant, expectant, or triumphant.

==== Volume III ====
This volume treats of the sacraments.

==== Volume IV ====
This volume is about divine grace, free will, justification, and good works.

== Almost in the Index ==
In 1590, Pope Sixtus V had, of his own initiative, placed the first volume on a new edition of the Index Librorum Prohibitorum for denying that the pope had direct temporal authority over the whole world. The entry concerning Bellarmine reads: "Roberti Bellarmini Disputationes de Controversiis Christianae fidei adversus huius temporis haereticos. Nisi prius ex superioribus regulis recognitae fuerint." However, Sixtus V died before he could promulgate the bull which would have made this new edition of the Index come into force. The successor of Sixtus V, Urban VII, asked for an examination and after it was done, Bellarmine was exonerated and the book was removed from the Index. Bellarmine reasoned that though the pope is the vicar of Christ, since Christ did not exercise his temporal power, nor may the pope.

== Translation into English ==
Though several books of this work have been translated into English in the past, only recently has it seen its first complete translation project in full, in an English translation made by Ryan Grant. Several parts of the work have been translated, and the whole project will be resumed after the translation project of Theologia Moralis by Saint Alphonsus Liguori is completed.

In 2016, Kenneth Baker's translation of the first three controversies was published as Controversies of the Christian Faith.

== Editions ==
- Bellarmine, Robert (2015). De Controversiis - On the Roman Pontiff. Vol. 1: Books 1-2. Translated by Grant, Ryan. Mediatrix Press. Extract of Book II, Chapter 30 (published online with permission)
- Bellarmine, Robert (2016). De Controversiis - On the Roman Pontiff. Vol. 2: Books 3-5. Translated by Grant, Ryan. Mediatrix Press. Extract of Book IV, Chapters 6 & 7 (published online with permission).
- Bellarmine, Robert (2016). De Controversiis: Tomus I - On the Roman Pontiff: In Five Books. Translated by Grant, Ryan. Mediatrix Press.
- Bellarmine, Robert (2016). De Controversiis - On the Church Militant. Translated by Grant, Ryan. Mediatrix Press.
- Bellarmine, Robert (2017). De Controversiis: Tomus II - On the Church: On Councils, The Church Militant, On the Marks of the Church. Vol. 1. Translated by Grant, Ryan. Mediatrix Press.
- Bellarmine, Robert (2017). De Controversiis - On Purgatory: The Members of the Church Suffering. Translated by Grant, Ryan. Mediatrix Press.
