= Petrus Morinus =

French biblical scholar

Petrus Morinus, also known as Pierre Morin (1531–1608) was a French biblical scholar.

== Life and career ==
Born in Paris, he moved to Italy, where he worked for a time with Paulus Manutius in Venice. He later taught Greek in Vicenza and Ferrara. By 1575, he was in Rome, working on editions of the Bible in the Vatican. He was also an editor of the Septuagint and the Vulgate.

== Death ==
Morinus died in Rome in 1608.
