= Johannes Hentenius =

Flemish Catholic biblical scholar

Johannes Hentenius (John Henten, (Note: Johannes, Jan, Jean, etc.; John Henton or Henten.) born 1499 at Nalinnes, now in Belgium; died 10 October 1566, at Leuven) was a Flemish Dominican Biblical exegete. He is well known for his edition of the Vulgate in 1547.

== Life ==
When quite young he took the vows of religion in the Hieronymite Order in Spain, but left it about 1548 to enter the Dominican Order at Leuven (French: Louvain), where he had gained a name at the university for scholarship. In 1550 he began to teach in the Dominican convent of that city, in which he became Regent of Studies three years later. He was made Defender of the Faith and inquisitor in 1556.

While prior of the Leuven convent he was chosen by the theological faculty of the university to take the place of John Hessel, Regius Professor of Sentences, who had been sent by the king to the Council of Trent, and was teaching at the university in 1565. Quétif and Jacques Échard say that he was praised by the writers of his century, especially by William Seguier in "Laur. Beig.", pt. I, 5 Dec., no. I, p. 57.

== Works ==
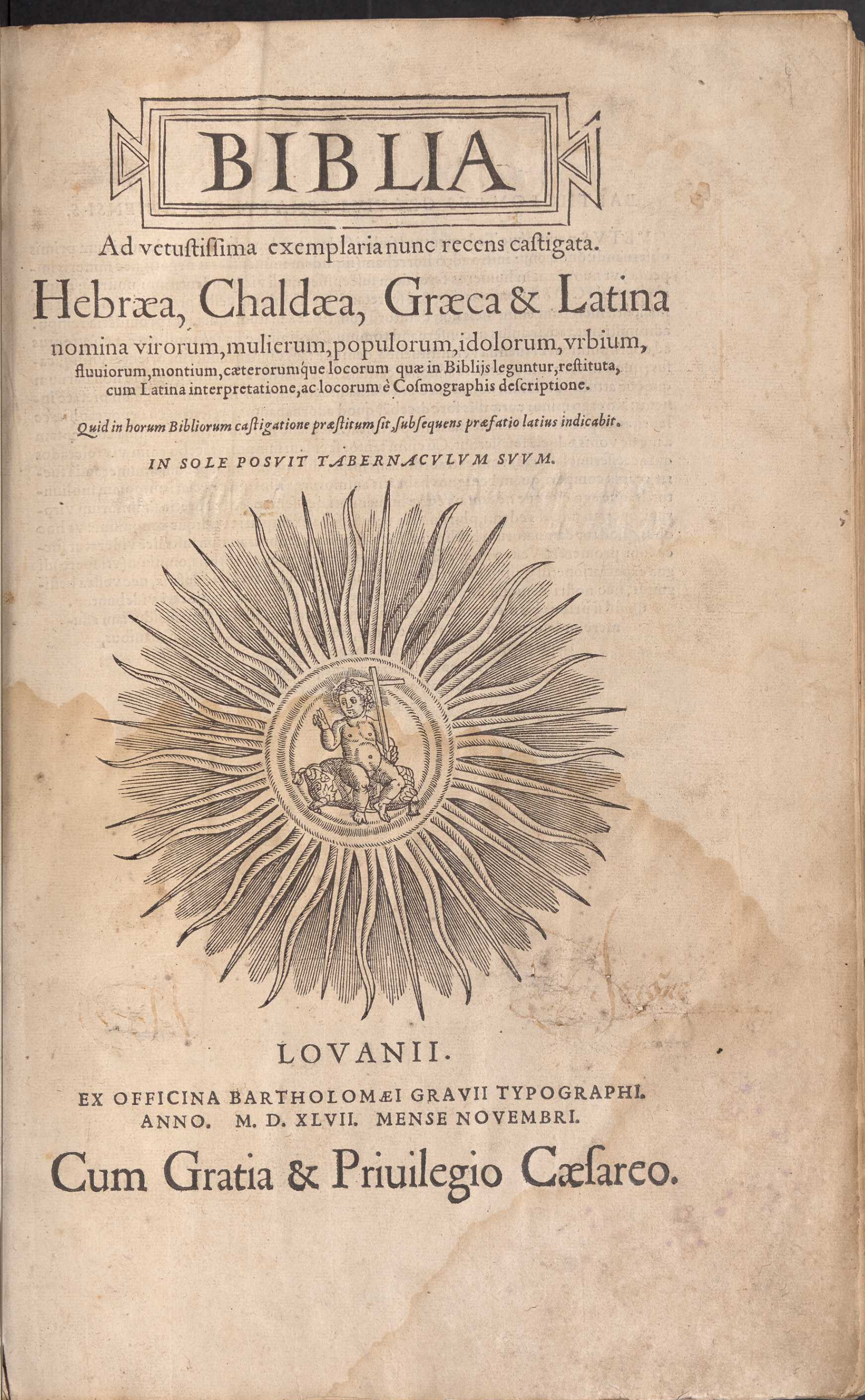
1547 edition of the Leuven Vulgate

His principal writings are:

- Hentenius, Joannes, ed. (1547). Biblia. Ad vetustissima exemplaria nunc recens castigata. Leuven: Bartholomaeus Gravius. (a.k.a. Leuven Vulgate) (republished many times elsewhere);
- Commentaria in quatuor Evangelia, consisting of commentaries by John Chrysostom and other early writers collected by Euthymius Zigabenus and interpreted by Hentenius (Louvain, 1544);
- Enarrationes in Acta Apost. et in Apocalypsin (Louvain, 1845, and repeatedly elsewhere);
- the same work, together with commentaries on the Epistles, as Œcumenii commentaria in Acta Apost. etc. (Paris, 1631).

== See also ==
- Leuven Vulgate
- Leuvense Bijbel
- Bible de Louvain
