= Leuven Vulgate =

1547 edition of the Vulgate made by Hentenius

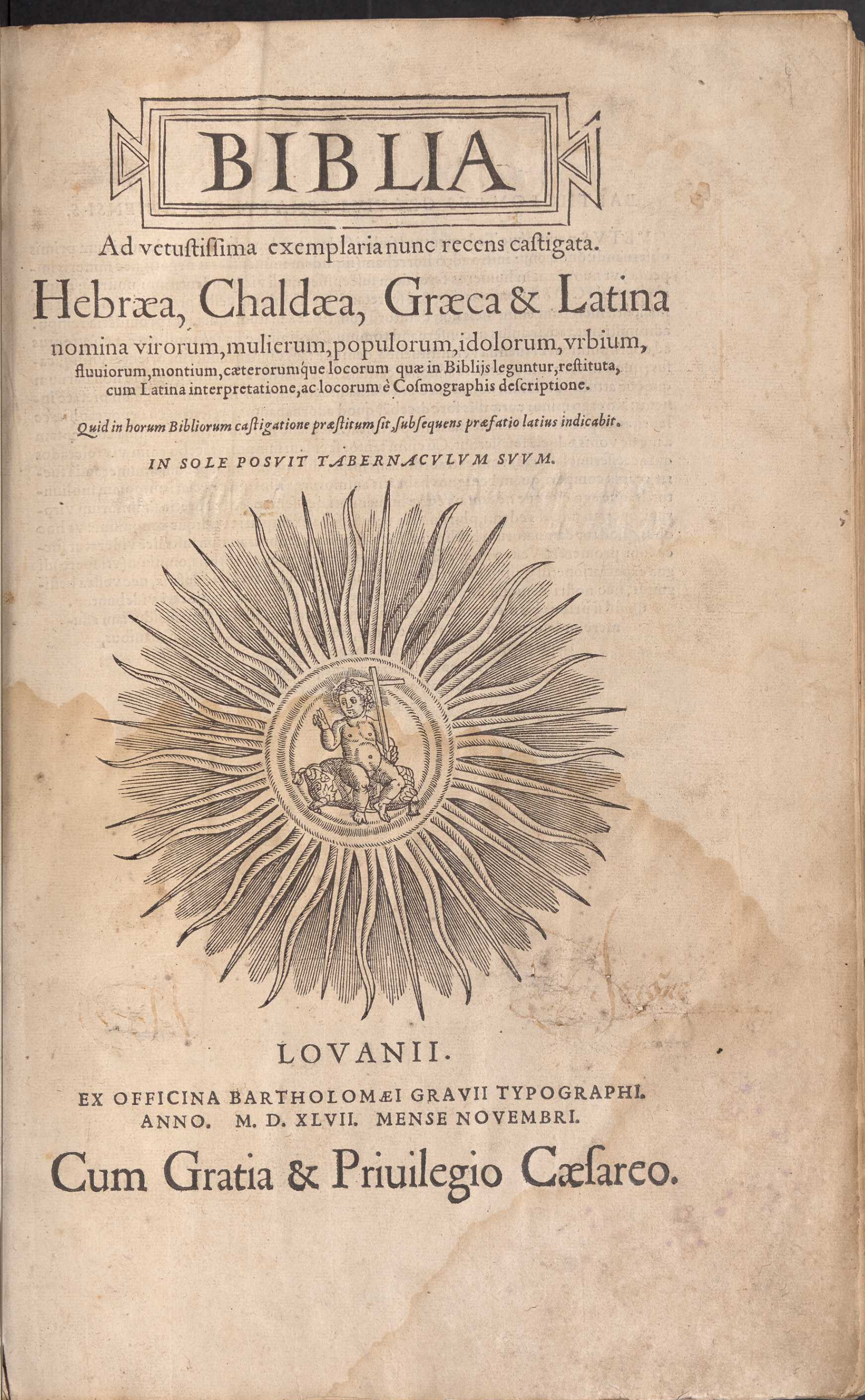
- Biblia Vulgata lovaniensis (1547)
- Other names: Hentenian Bible
- Language: Late Latin
- Complete Bible published: 1547; revision published in 1574; appendix added in the 1583 edition
- Textual basis: Vulgate
- Religious affiliation: Catholic Church

The Leuven Vulgate or Hentenian Bible (French: Louvain Vulgate, Latin: Biblia Vulgata lovaniensis) was the first standardized edition of the Latin Vulgate. The Leuven Vulgate essentially served as the standard text of the Catholic Church from its publication in 1547 until the Sixtine Vulgate was published in 1590. The 1583 edition of the Leuven Vulgate is cited in the Oxford Vulgate New Testament, where it is designated by the siglum H (H for Hentenian).

In 1546, partly in response to the Protestant Reformation, the Council of Trent declared the Vulgate the official Bible of the Catholic church. However, there were different versions of the Vulgate in use, and no edition was accepted as standard. In response, Biblical scholar Johannes Hentenius (John Henten) sought to produce a more reliable edition by comparing thirty different manuscripts of the Vulgate and drawing from the work of earlier scholars, such as Robert Estienne. This standardized Vulgate was edited by Hentenius and published in 1547 in Leuven, Belgium, hence the name "Leuven Vulgate". This edition was republished several times, and in 1574, a revised edition was published.

== History ==
=== Publications ===
On 8 April 1546, at the Council of Trent, a decision was made to prepare an authorized version of the Vulgate. No direct action was taken for the next forty years, and many scholars continued to publish their own editions. Among these editions, the edition prepared by Hentenius served almost as the standard text of the Catholic Church.

The first edition of Hentenius was entitled Biblia ad vetustissima exemplaria nunc recens castigata and was published by the printer Bartholomaeus Gravius in November 1547. Hentenius used over thirty Vulgate manuscripts to make his edition. Hentenius' edition is similar to the 1532 and 1540 editions of the Vulgate produced by Robert Estienne.

=== Lucas Brugensis editions ===
After the death of Hentenius in 1566, Franciscus Lucas Brugensis continued his critical work and prepared his own edition; the edition was published in 1574 in Antwerp by Plantin, under the title: Biblia Sacra: Qui in hac editione, a Theologis Lovanienibus prestitum sit, paulo post indicatur. This revision has the same text as the original edition. However the punctuation was modified, and supplementary variants were added in the margin; few variants from the original edition were removed.

In 1583, a new edition of the Leuven Vulgate was published by the Plantin Press. This edition was a reprint of the 1574 edition with as a supplement in appendix a critical apparatus made by Lucas Brugensis: his Notationes in sacra Biblia previously published independently in 1580. This edition was published under the title: Biblia Sacra, quid in hac editione a theologis Lovaniensibus praestitum sit, eorum praefatio indicat. (Note: A. Gerace previously stated that this 1583 edition containing the Notationes was the one published under the title Theologis Lovanienibus prestitum sit, paulo post indicator [sic, indicatur]. However, he later amended his opinion to state that the edition containing the Notationes is the edition titled Biblia Sacra, quid in hac editione a theologis Lovaniensibus praestitum sit, eorum praefatio indicat.)

== Importance ==
The 1583 edition of the Leuven Vulgate served as the basis for the elaboration of the Sixtine and Clementine editions of the Vulgate.

Using the Leuven Vulgate as basis, Nicolaus van Winghe translated the Bible into Dutch (1548), and Nicolas de Leuze translated the Bible into French (1550). Both translations were published in Leuven. Jakub Wujek based his translation, the Wujek Bible, on the 1574 edition of the Leuven Vulgate. Because the Douay-Rheims Bible was translated in 1582, it is a virtual certainty that the Leuven Vulgate, presumably the 1574 revision, was the translation basis for the Douay-Rheims Bible.
