= Vetus Latina manuscripts =

Manuscripts of Vetus Latina versions of the Bible

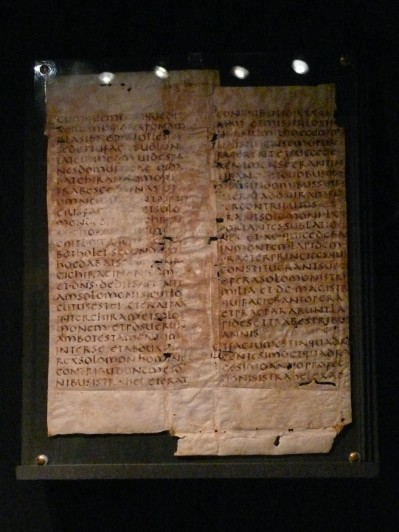
Part of the 5th-century Quedlinburg Itala fragment, the oldest surviving Old Testament Vetus Latina manuscript

Vetus Latina manuscripts are handwritten copies of the earliest Latin translations of the Bible (including the Hebrew Bible/Old Testament, the Deuterocanonical books, and the New Testament), known as the "Vetus Latina" or "Old Latin". They originated prior to Jerome from multiple translators, and differ from Vulgate manuscripts which follow the late-4th-century Latin translation mainly done by Jerome.

Vetus Latina and Vulgate manuscripts continued to be copied alongside each other until the Late Middle Ages; many copies of the Bible or parts of it have been found using a mixture of Vetus Latina and Vulgate readings.

== Studies ==
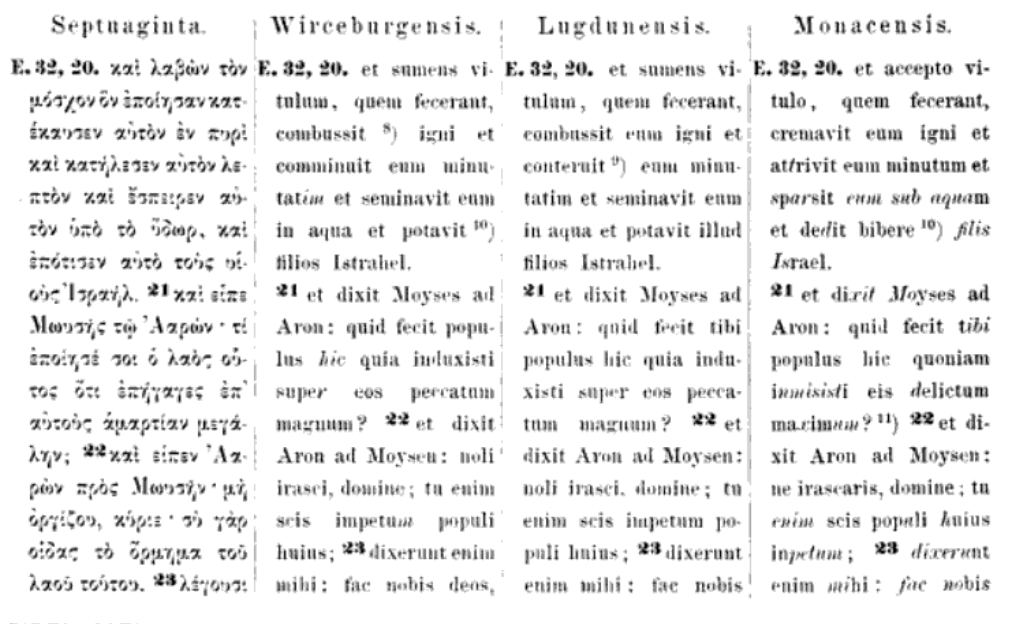
Ziegler (1883) comparing three different Vetus Latina manuscripts (W, L, M) of Exodus 32 with the Septuagint (LXX)

Textual critics such as the Cambridge scholars Alan Brooke, Norman McLean and Henry S. J. Thackeray (1906–1935, 8 volumes) have used the blackletter (𝕷) as a sign (known as a siglum) for categorising Vetus Latina manuscripts. David L. Everson (2014) used "OL" (an abbreviation of "Old Latin") as siglum instead.

In 1949, the Vetus-Latina-Institut of Beuron Archabbey introduced a new numerical system for Vetus Latina manuscripts, of which there are several hundreds altogether. These Beuron numbers are designed to provide unambiguous identification of witnesses in academic usage, yet they are not used very widely in general literature, as they may cause confusion with the Greek minuscule manuscripts.

The Vetus-Latina-Institut allocated numbers up to 99 to all existing Vetus Latina manuscripts of the New Testament, depending on what parts of NT they include, and how old their text is. The lowest numbers are allocated to the gospels, and to the most complete manuscripts. For example, Codex Sangermanensis (g^{1}) is a witness for the Gospel of Matthew and sparingly in the remaining gospels (Gosp), and four Old Testament Books, and as it is a full manuscript of the Bible is allocated number 7.

- Manuscripts 1-49 are witnesses to one or more Gospels.
- Manuscripts 50-74 are witnesses to Acts, General epistles or the Book of Revelation (Rev).
- Manuscripts 75-89 are witnesses to Pauline epistles (Paul).
- Manuscripts 91-96 are glosses in Spanish Bibles.

From Beuron no. #100 onwards, most Vetus Latina manuscripts are of the Old Testament, the Psalter, and the Apocrypha. There is occasional overlap between them, for example Old Testament glosses found in Spanish Bibles, or when a manuscript contains both Old and New Testament texts.

== Old Testament ==
- Dates are estimated to the nearest 50 year increment.
- Beu indicates the number of the manuscript according to the Beuron system of the Vetus-Latina-Institut.

Unless specified otherwise, details in the below taken from Fitzmyer, Tobit.

Beu	s.	Name	Date	Contents	Editor	Custodian	Location
7	G	Codex Sangermanensis 4 fonds lat. 11553	825	Tobit 1:1–13:2	Petrus Sabatier; Brooke et al.	Bibliothèque nationale de France	Paris, France
91; 133	L	Codex Gothicus; Legionensis glosses	960	Genesis (fragments); Tobit; Judith	Sancho (author); Alban Dold & J. Schildenberger	Basilica of San Isidoro	León, Spain
94		Valvanera Polyglot Bible glosses copy	772; 1561	Heptateuch Rg Par Jb Prv Ecl Sap; Is Mcc Cath Apc (fragments)	Hernando del Castillo; Dold & Schildenberger	Incunable Escorial; 54.V.35	Madrid, Spain
95		Madrid glosses	1150	Genesis (fragments)		Real Academia de la Historia 2–3	Madrid, Spain
96		Calahorra Codex 2 glosses	1183	Exodus–Chron., Job (fragm.)	–	Calahorra Cathedral	Calahorra, Spain
100	OL^{L} 𝔏^{r}	Codex Lugdunensis; Lyons Octateuch	650	Gen–Lev; Deut–Judges; Exodus (695 vv.)	Ulysse Robert	Bibliothèque municipale de Lyon	Lyon, France
101; 115	OL^{V} 𝔏^{b}	Vienna Palimpsest; Palimpsestus Vindobonensis	450	Gen–Lev (fragments); 1 Samuel 1–14 (partial); 2 Samuel 4–18 (partial)	Johannes Belsheim; Bonifatius Fischer	Biblioteca Nazionale	Naples, Italy
102	OL^{O}	Codex Ottobonianus lat. 66	700	Gen–Judges Vg/OL mixture	Carlo Vercellone	Vatican Library	Vatican City
103	OL^{W} 𝔏^{w}	Würzburg Palimpsest; Palimpsestus Wirceburgensis	450	Exodus (503 vv.)	Ernst Ranke	Universitätsbibliothek; Würzburg	Würzburg, Germany
104	OL^{M} 𝔏^{z}	Munich Palimpsest; Monacensis Clm 6225	550	Exodus–Deuteronomy (609 vv. of Exodus)	Leo Ziegler	Bavarian State Library	Munich, Germany
105	𝔓 Oxy. 1073	Oxyrhynchus Papyrus; VIII 1073	450	Genesis 5:4–13, 5:29–6:2		British Museum; Inv. 2052	London, UK
109	X	Codex Complutensis I	850	Tobit	F. Vattioni	Complutense University; Biblioteca Centr. 31	Madrid, Spain
111		Oxford pericopes	825	Gen, Exo, Deut, Songs, Psalm 41, Is, Minor Prophets		Bodleian Library; Auct. F.4.32	Oxford, UK
116	𝔏^{m}	Magdeburg fragment		2 Samuel 2:29–3:5	Wilhelm Weissbrodt		
116	𝔏^{q}	Quedlinburg Itala fragment	450	1 Samuel 5:9–6:12; 1 Samuel 9:1–8, 10:10–18	Adalbert Düning; Wilhelm Weissbrodt	Berlin State Library; Quedlinburg Abbey	Berlin, Germany; Quedlinburg, Germany
130	M	Codex Monacensis; Clm 6239	800	Tobit, Judith, Esther	Johannes Belsheim	Bavarian State Library	Munich, Germany
135	J	Codex Bobbiensis E.26	875	Tobit, Esther 1–2, 2 Macc.	Antonio Maria Ceriani	Biblioteca Ambrosiana	Milan, Italy
145	C	Codex Reginensis lat. 7	850	Tobit 1:1–6:12	Petrus Sabatier; Brooke et al.	Vatican Library	Vatican City
148	Q	Codex Regius fonds lat. 93 or Regius 3564	850	Tobit	Petrus Sabatier; Brooke et al.	Bibliothèque nationale de France	Paris, France
150	P	Codex Corbeiensis fonds lat. 11505	822	Tobit	Petrus Sabatier; Brooke et al.	Bibliothèque nationale de France	Paris, France
253	𝔏^{e}	Einsiedeln fragment	1420	1 Samuel 2:3–10	S. Berger (1893)	Einsiedeln Abbey	Einsiedeln, Switzerland
	𝔏^{h}	Haupt fragments		2 Samuel 10:18–11:17, 14:17–30	Joseph Haupt		
	𝔏^{j}	Julius Toletanus fragment		2 Samuel 24:11–16	Carlo Vercellone		

=== Editions ===
s.	Name	Date	Contents	Editor	Location
OL^{Sb} 𝔏^{s}	Bibliorum sacrorum latinae versiones antiquae	1750	Entire Bible	Petrus Sabatier	Paris
𝔏^{v}	Variae lectiones Vulgatae Latinae bibliorum editionis	1860–64	Volume 1: Genesis-Deuteronomium; Volume 2: Josue-IV Regum	Carlo Vercellone	Rome
	Vetus Latina: die Reste der altlateinischen Bibel	1945–present	Entire Bible (half completed, in progress): Genesis 1951–1954; Ruth 2005; Esra I 2008–2016; Judith 2001–2020; Hester 2003–2008; Canticum Canticorum 1992; Sapientia Salomonis 1977–1985; Sirach (Ecclesiasticus) 1987–2005; Esaias 1987–1997; Danihel 2021–2022	Vetus-Latina-Institut	Beuron

== New Testament ==
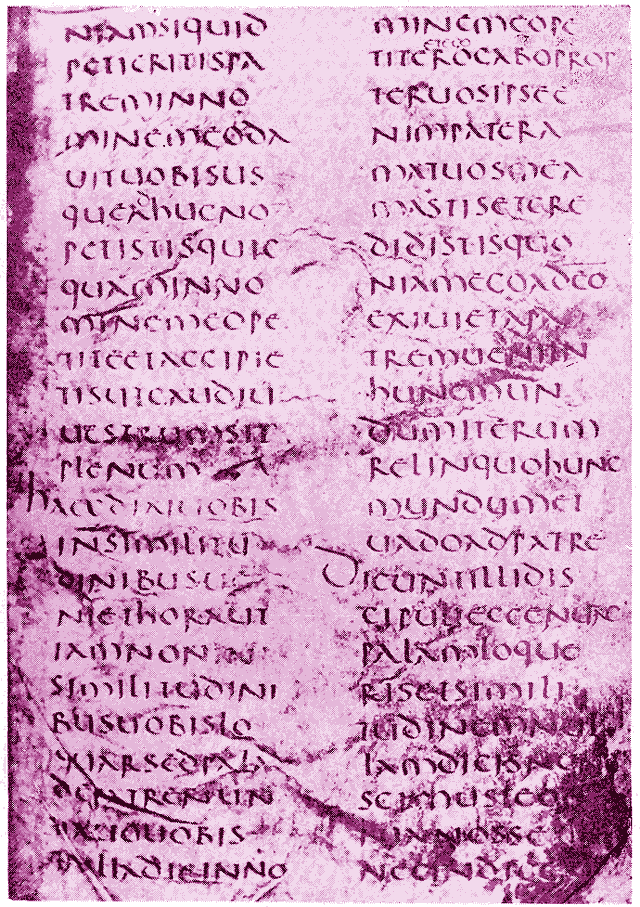
Codex Vercellensis

The table below employs the following conventions.

- Dates are estimated to the nearest 50-year increment (but 'first half of 5th century' = '425', 'second half of 5th century' = '475').
- Content is given to the nearest book (or sometimes chapter); verses and lacunae are not listed.
- Editions are those consulted by UBS4; in many cases, better editions are also available.
- Locations are given in anglicised form, unless linked to sources in other languages.
- Manuscripts will sometimes be referred to as "it" followed by the siglum.
- Beu indicates the number of the manuscript according to the Beuron system of the Vetus-Latina-Institut.

Unless specified otherwise, details taken from Piggin, The Original Beuron Numbers of 1949.

Beu	s.	Name	Date	Contents	Editor	Custodian	City, State	Country
1	k	Codex Bobiensis	350	Matthew; Mark	Jülicher	Turin National University Library	Turin	Italy
2	e	Codex Palatinus	350	Gospels	Jülicher	Buonconsiglio Castle (Ms 1589); Trinity College Dublin (MS 1709); British Library (Add. MS 40107)	Trento; Dublin; London	Italy; Ireland; United Kingdom
3	a	Codex Vercellensis	375	Gospels	Jülicher	Vercelli Cathedral Library	Vercelli	Italy
4	b	Codex Veronensis	500	Gospels	Jülicher	Verona Cathedral Library	Verona	Italy
5	d	Codex Bezae	400	Gosp; Acts; 3J	Jülicher	Cambridge University Library	Cambridge	United Kingdom
6	c	Codex Colbertinus	1200	Gosp; Acts; 3J	Jülicher	National Library of France (lat. 254)	Paris	France
7	g^{1}	Codex Sangermanensis I	800	Matthew, OT parts	Sabatier	National Library of France (lat. 11553)	Paris	France
8	ff^{2}	Codex Corbeiensis II	450	Gospels	Jülicher	National Library of France (lat. 17225)	Paris	France
9	ff^{1}	Codex Corbeiensis I	950	Matthew	Jülicher	Russian National Library	Saint Petersburg	Russia
10	f	Codex Brixianus	525	Gospels	Jülicher	Biblioteca Queriniana	Brescia	Italy
11	l	Codex Rehdigeranus	700	Gospels	Jülicher	Berlin State Library (Depot Breslau 3)	Berlin	Germany
12	h	Codex Claromontanus V	500	Matthew; Rev	Jülicher	Vatican Library	Vatican City	Vatican City
13	q	Frisingensia Fragmenta 24; Frisingensis/Monacensis	650	Gospels	Jülicher	Bavarian State Library (clm 6224); Frising. 24	Munich	Germany
14	r^{1}	Codex Usserianus Primus	600	Gospels	Jülicher	Trinity College Dublin	Dublin	Ireland
15	aur	Stockholm Codex Aureus; Aureus Holmiensis	650	Gospels	Jülicher	National Library of Sweden	Stockholm	Sweden
16	n	Codex Curiensis; Fragmenta Curiensa a^{2}	450	Luke 11; 13	Jülicher	Rätisches Museum	Chur	Switzerland
16	n	Codex Sangallensis 1394 II	450	Gospels	Jülicher	Abbey library of Saint Gall; Cod. Sang. 1394 II p. 50–89	St. Gallen	Switzerland
16	n	Codex Sangallensis 1394 III; Fragmentum Sangallense	450	Mark 16:14–20	Jülicher	Abbey library of Saint Gall; Cod. Sang. 1394 III p. 91–92	St. Gallen	Switzerland
17	i	Vindobonensis Lat. 1235	600	Mark; Luke	Jülicher	National Library of Naples	Naples	Italy
18	w π	Fragmenta Stuttgartensia; Fragmenta Weingartensia; Fragmenta Constantiensia	650	Gospel pericope fragments	Jülicher		Stuttgart; Darmstadt; Donaueschingen	Germany
19	t	Fragmenta Bernensia	550	Mark 1–3	Jülicher	Bern University Library	Bern	Switzerland
20	p	Codex Sangallensis 1395 VII	750	John 11	Jülicher	Abbey library of Saint Gall	St. Gallen	Switzerland
21	s	Codex Ambrosianus; O. 210 sup.	600	Luke 17–21	Jülicher	Ambrose Library	Milan	Italy
22	j z	Codex Sarzanensis	500	Luke 24, John	Jülicher		Sarezzano	Italy
23		Papyrus 2aE.	450	John 7		Aberdeen University Library	Aberdeen	United Kingdom
24	ρ	Codex Ambrosianus; M. 12 sup., Palimpsest	700	John 13	Jülicher	Ambrose Library	Milan	Italy
25	v	Vindobonensis Lat. 502	650	John 19–20	Jülicher	Austrian National Library	Vienna	Austria
26		Codex Carinthianus	650	Luke 1–2	Jülicher	Saint Paul's Abbey, Lavanttal	Sankt Paul	Austria
27	δ	Codex Sangallensis 48	850	Four Gospels	Jülicher	Abbey library of Saint Gall	St. Gallen	Switzerland
28	r^{2}	Codex Usserianus II	800	Gospels	Jülicher	Trinity College Dublin	Dublin	Ireland
29	g^{2}	Codex Sangermanensis II fond lat. 13169	950	Gospels	Sabatier	National Library of France	Paris	France
30	gat	Codex Gatianum	750	Gospels		National Library of France	Paris	France
32		Lectionary	500	OT/NT Vg/VL mix	—	Duke Augustus Library	Wolfenbüttel	Germany
34		Pericope		John 1	—	Grottaferrata Abbey	Grottaferrata	Germany
35	μ	Book of Mulling	800	Gospels	—	Trinity College Dublin	Dublin	Ireland
47	Hu	Codex Sangallensis 60	800	John	Jülicher	Abbey library of Saint Gall	St. Gallen	Switzerland
48	Hs	Codex Sangallensis 51	800	Matthew	Jülicher	Abbey library of Saint Gall	St. Gallen	Switzerland
50	e	Codex Laudianus	550	Acts	Tischendorf	Bodleian Library	Oxford	United Kingdom
51	gig	Codex Gigas	1250	Acts; Rev	Wordsworth	National Library of Sweden	Stockholm	Sweden
52	g^{2}	Codex Mediolanensis	775	Acts 6-7		Biblioteca Ambrosiana	Milan	Italy
53	s	Codex Bobiensis	550	Acts; Cath	White	National Library of Naples	Naples	Italy
54	p		1250	Acts; Cath	Wordsworth	National Library of France	Paris	France
55	h	Codex Floriacensis; Palimpsestus Floriacensis	450	Acts; Cath; Rev	Buchanan	National Library of France	Paris	France
56	t	Liber Comicus	1050	Acts; Paul; Cath; Rev	Morin	National Library of France	Paris	France
57	r	Codex Schlettstadtensis	700	Acts	Morin	Humanist Library of Sélestat	Sélestat	France
58	w	—	1450	Acts	—	Bibliothek Stolberg	Wernigerode	Germany
59	dem	Codex Demidovianus	1250	Acts; Paul; Cath	Matthaei	lost		Russia
61	D	Book of Armagh	800	Acts	Gwynn	Trinity College Dublin	Dublin	Ireland
62	r	Biblia de Rosas latin 6, 1–4	950	Acts	-	National Library of France	Paris	France
63		Ms. 146	1150	Acts	Sanders	University of Michigan Library	Ann Arbor, Michigan	United States
64	q	Codex Monacensis	700	Cath	Bruyne	Bavarian State Library clm 6220, 6230,6277,6317,28135	Munich	Germany
64	r	Frisingensia Fragmenta; 236	700	Cath	—	Bavarian State Library clm 6436 (Frising. 236)	Munich	Germany
64	r^{3}	Codex Monacensis	700	Paul	Bruyne	Bavarian State Library clm 6220, 6230,6277,6317,28135	Munich	Germany
65	z	Harley 1772	750	Cath, Paul, Rev	Buchanan	British Library	London	United Kingdom
66	ff	Codex Corbiensis	1000	James	Wordsworth	Russian National Library	Saint Petersburg	Russia
67	l	León palimpsest	650	Cath, 1–{2 Mcc	Fischer	León Cathedral Archive	León	Spain
74	sin	Fragmentum Sinaiticum	900	Acts	__	Saint Catherine's Monastery	Mount Sinai	Egypt
75	d	Codex Claromontanus	500	Paul	Tischendorf	National Library of France	Paris	France
76	e	Codex Sangermanensis	850	Paul	Tischendorf	Russian National Library	Saint Petersburg	Russia
77	g	Codex Boernerianus	850	Paul	Matthaei	Saxon State Library	Dresden	Germany
78	f	Codex Augiensis	850	Paul	Scrivener	Trinity College, Cambridge	Cambridge	United Kingdom
79	w gue	Codex Carolinus; Guelferbytanus 64 palimp.	550	Romans†	Tischendorf	Duke Augustus Library	Wolfenbüttel	Germany
80	p	—	550	Romans 5–6†	—	University Library Heidelberg	Heidelberg	Germany
81	v	Codex Parisiensis fond lat. 653	800	Heb	Souter	National Library of France	Paris	France
82		—	850	Hebrews	—	Bavarian State Library	Munich	Germany
83	w	Codex Waldeccensis	1050	Paul	Schultze	City archives Mengeringhausen	Mengeringhausen	Germany

=== Editions ===
by editor

For precision, publication data is given in the language of the title page of the edition. To make this information comprehensible to the English language reader, links are provided to English language article titles, where necessary and possible.

When a single editor is responsible for more than one edition, these are listed in alphabetical order of the sigla of the relevant manuscripts. In such cases, if the manuscript is not readily identifiable from the title, its name (siglum and number) are appended after the citation.

- Buchanan, Edgar S. The Epistles and Apocalypse from the Codex Harleianus. Sacred Latin Texts 1. London, 1912.
- Buchanan, Edgar S. The Four Gospels from the Codex Corbeiensis, together with fragments of the Catholic Epistles, of the Acts and of the Apocalypse from the Fleury Palimpsest. Old Latin Biblical Texts 5. Oxford, 1907. [Codex Floriacensis (h 55)]
- Bruyne, Donatien de. Les Fragments de Freising— épitres de S. Paul et épttres catholiques. Collectanea Biblica Latina 5. Rome, 1921. (in French)
- Fischer, Bonifatius. Ein neuer Zeuge zum westlichen Text der Apostelgeschichte. Pages 33–63 in J. Neville Birdsall and R.W. Thomson (eds). Biblical and Patristic Studies in Memory of Robert Pierce Casey. Freiburg im Breisgau: Verlag Herder, 1963. (in German)
- Frede, HJ. Altlateinische Paulus-Handschriften. Freiburg im Breisgau: Verlag Herder, 1964. (in German)
- Gwynn, John. Liber Ardmachanus: The Book of Armagh. Dublin, 1913.
- Jülicher, Adolf, Walter Matzkow and Kurt Aland (eds). Itala: Das Neue Testament in altlateinischer Überliefung. 4 volumes [Matthew–John]. Berlin: Walter de Gruyter and Company, 1938–1972. (in German)
- Matthaei, C. F., Novum Testamentum, XII, tomis distinctum Graece et Latine. Textum denuo recensuit, varias lectiones nunquam antea vulgatas ex centum codicibus MSS.... 12 volumes. Rigae, 1782-1788. (in Latin)
- Matthaei, C. F., Novum Testamentum, XIII. Epistolarum Pauli Codex Graecus cum versione Latino veteri vulgo Antehieronymiana olim Buernerianus nunc Bibliothecae Electoralis Dresdeiisis ... Lipsiae, 1791. (in Latin)
- Morin, Germain. Études, textes, découvertes. Contributions a la littérature et a l'histoire des douze premiers siècles. Anecdota Maredsolana, 2e Série 1. Paris: Abbaye de Maredsous, 1913. (in French) [Codex Schlettstadtensis (r 57)]
- Morin, Germain. Liber Comicus sive Lectionarius missae quo Toletana Ecclesia ante annos mille et ducentos utebatur. Anecdota Maredsolana 1. Marodsoli, 1893. (in French)
- Sanders, HA. 'The Text of Acts in Ms. 146 of the University of Michigan'. Proceedings of the American Philosophical Society 77 (1937): –.
- de:Schultze, Victor. Codex Waldeccensis. München, 1904.
- Scrivener, FHA. An Exact Transcript of the Codex Augiensis. Cambridge and London, 1859.
- Souter, Alexander. Miscellanea Ehrle 1. Studi e Testi 137. Roma, 1924.
- Tischendorf, Constantin von. Codex Claromontanus. Lipsiae, 1852.
- Tischendorf, Constantin von. Codex Laudianus, sive Actus apostolorum Graeces et Latine. Monumenta sacra inedita, nova collectio 9. Lipsiae, 1870.
- Tischendorf, Constantin von. Anecdota Sacra et Profana. Editio repetita, emendata, aucta. Lipsiae, 1861. [Codex Guelferbytanus (gue 79)]
- White, Henry Julian. Portions of the Acts of the Apostles, of the Epistles of St. James, and of the First Epistle of St. Peter from the Bobbio Palimpsest. Old Latin Biblical Texts 4. Oxford: The Clarendon Press, 1897.

== See also ==
- Lists of New Testament manuscripts
- Septuagint manuscripts
- Vulgate manuscripts
- List of Hebrew Bible manuscripts
