= Codex Monacensis =

Codex Monacensis (plural Monacenses) is the designation of several codices housed at the Bavarian State Library in Munich (German: München Latin: Monacum). These include:

- Codex Latinus Monacensis (clm), several related Vetus Latina manuscripts
  - Frisingensia Fragmenta (Frising.) 24 and 236, also known as Codex Frisingensis or Codex Latinus Monacensis (clm) 6436, Gospels and Catholic Epistles
  - Codex latinus monacensis (clm) 6220, 6230, 6277, 6317, 28135, Pauline and Catholic Epistles
  - Fragmentum Monacense, Matthew 9–10; see Vetus Latina manuscripts § Old Testament
  - Munich Palimpsest (clm 6225), Exodus–Deuteronomy; see Vetus Latina manuscripts § Old Testament
  - Codex latinus monacensis (clm 6239), Tobit, Judith, Esther
- Codex Monacensis (X 033), a Greek uncial manuscript of the Gospels, dated palaeographically to the 9th or 10th century
- Munich Serbian Psalter, also known as Codex Monacensis Slavicus 4, a 14th-century illuminated psalter written in Church Slavonic of the Serbian recension
- Cgm 558 (Codex germanicus monacensis 558), a convolution of two 15th-century manuscripts

== See also ==
- Bavarian State Library § Inventory
- CGM (disambiguation)
