= Amherst papyri =

Ancient papyrus collection

Hieroglyphic papyrus from the Twenty-sixth Dynasty (664–525 BC), containing the Book of the Dead, now Amherst Egyptian Papyrus 22.4

The Amherst papyri are a collection of ancient papyri now mostly kept in the Pierpont Morgan Library in New York. They were acquired by John Pierpont Morgan in 1912. They are named for Lord Amherst of Hackney, who began assembling the collection in the 1860s through purchases from R. T. Lieder and John Lee. He kept them at Didlington Hall in Norfolk.

The collection includes or included 42 papyri in Egyptian written in hieroglyphic or hieratic script; 84 in Coptic, of which only 37 were ever catalogued, the rest being described as "very decayed, powdery and worthless"; and 237 mainly in Demotic Egyptian and Greek, but including a few in Coptic, Arabic and Latin.

== List ==
- Astarte and the Insatiable Sea
- Papyrus 12
- Papyrus Amherst 3a
- Papyrus Amherst 63
- Papyrus Leopold II
- Philinna Papyrus
- Uncial 076

== Bibliography ==
- Grenfell, Bernard P.; Hunt, Arthur S. (1900). The Amherst Papyri: Being an Account of the Greek Papyri in the Collection of the Right Hon. Lord Amherst of Hackney, F.S.A. at Didlington Hall, Norfolk. Vol. 1: The Ascension of Isaiah, and Other Theological Fragments. Bernard Quaritch.
- Grenfell, Bernard P.; Hunt, Arthur S. (1901). The Amherst Papyri: Being an Account of the Greek Papyri in the Collection of the Right Hon. Lord Amherst of Hackney, F.S.A. at Didlington Hall, Norfolk. Vol. 2: Classical Fragments and Documents of the Ptolemaic, Roman and Byzantine Periods. Bernard Quaritch.
- Jellicoe, Sidney (1993). The Septuagint and Modern Study. Eisenbrauns.
- Newberry, Percy E. (1899). The Amherst Papyri: Being an Account of the Egyptian Papyri in the Collection of the Right Hon. Lord Amherst of Hackney, F.S.A. at Didlington Hall, Norfolk. Bernard Quaritch.
- Steiner, Richard C. (2017). "Lord Amherst's Demotic Papyri and Lady Amherst's Mummy". Bernard Revel Graduate School of Jewish Studies Faculty Publications. Yeshiva University.
