= Codex Carinthianus =

The Codex Curinthianus, designated by β or 26 (in Beuron system), is a 6th or 7th century Latin manuscript of the New Testament. The text, written on vellum, is a version of the old Latin. The manuscript contains the fragments of the Gospel of Luke, on only 2 parchment leaves.

It contains a fragments of the Gospel of Luke 1:64-2:50 on two folios. It was published by Donatien de Bruyne.

The Latin text of the codex is a representative of the Western text-type in itala recension.

It is housed at the St. Paul's Abbey in the Lavanttal (Stiftsbibliothek, 25.3.19) in Carinthia.

== See also ==
- List of New Testament Latin manuscripts
- Codex Frisingensis
