= Giuseppe Cozza-Luzi =

Italian scholar and abbot

Giuseppe Cozza-Luzi (24 December 1837 – 1 June 1905) was an Italian scholar and abbot of the Basilian monastery of Grottaferrata near Rome.

== Biography ==
Cozza-Luzi was born in 1837 at Bolsena in the Province of Rome. In early youth he entered the ancient monastery of which he became abbot in 1882. Pius IX was attracted by his scholarship, as was later Leo XIII.

In 1898 he retired from his official duties and devoted himself to his studies. He won distinction by his edition of several ancient Vatican manuscripts and was also learned in the history of art and in archaeology. The Catholic Encyclopedia describes him as intelligent and cultured, but lacking in scientific accuracy and disorganized in his research.

He died in Rome on 1 June 1905.

== Works ==
Under his direction the phototype edition of the Codex Vaticanus Graecus 1209 was executed, (Vetus et Novum Testamentum e Cod. Vaticano 1209 phototyp., 5 volumes fol., Rome, 1889), also a Vatican codex of the prophets (ibid., 1889), and from a Vatican manuscript the miniatures of Giulio Clovio to Dante's Paradiso. Nearly all the copies of these artistic publications perished at the burning of the Danesi establishment in Rome.

Together with the well-known scriptural scholar Carlo Vercellone, he supervised the printing of the Greek text of the Codex Vaticanus, in five volumes (Rome, 1868–81); he also edited other scriptural manuscripts, e.g. the Greek codex of Daniel in the Chigi Library at Rome. His most important scientific work was the publication of some fragments of the Geography of Strabo (Rome, 1884), originally discovered by Cardinal Mai, who was unaware of their importance. Cozza-Luzi also published of the eighth and ninth volumes of Mai's Nova Bibliotheca Patrum, and a part of the cardinal's correspondence.

Among the theological treatises of Cozza-Luzi is a study on the evidence of the Greek liturgies to the papal supremacy (De Rom. Pont. auctorit. doctrinali testim. liturg. ecclesiæ græcæ, Rome, 1870).

He wrote also on the antiquities of his native Bolsena, on the cathedral of Orvieto, the Vatican collection of Assyrian antiquities, etc. Among his publications is an edition of the Greek version of St. Gregory the Great's account of St. Benedict (Historia S. P. N. Benedicti a Pontif. Gregorio I descripta et a Zacharia græce reddita, Tivoli, 1880).

He edited the text of Codex Marchalianus (Prophetarum codex Graecus Vaticanus 2125 (Romae, 1890)).

Many of his writings are scattered in various Italian periodicals, ecclesiastical and historical.

In addition, he is noted as the author of some falsifications of Giacomo Leopardi (edited in Rome in 1898). The falsity of the sketches was revealed by Sebastiano Timpanaro in 1966.

- Cozza-Luzi, Giuseppe (1893). Codices manuscripti graeci ottoboniani Bibliothecae Vaticanae descripti praeside Alphonso cardinali Capecelatro archiepiscopo Capuano. London: Ex Typographeo Vaticano.
