= Papyrus 12 =

Papyrus 𝔓^{12}
- New Testament manuscript
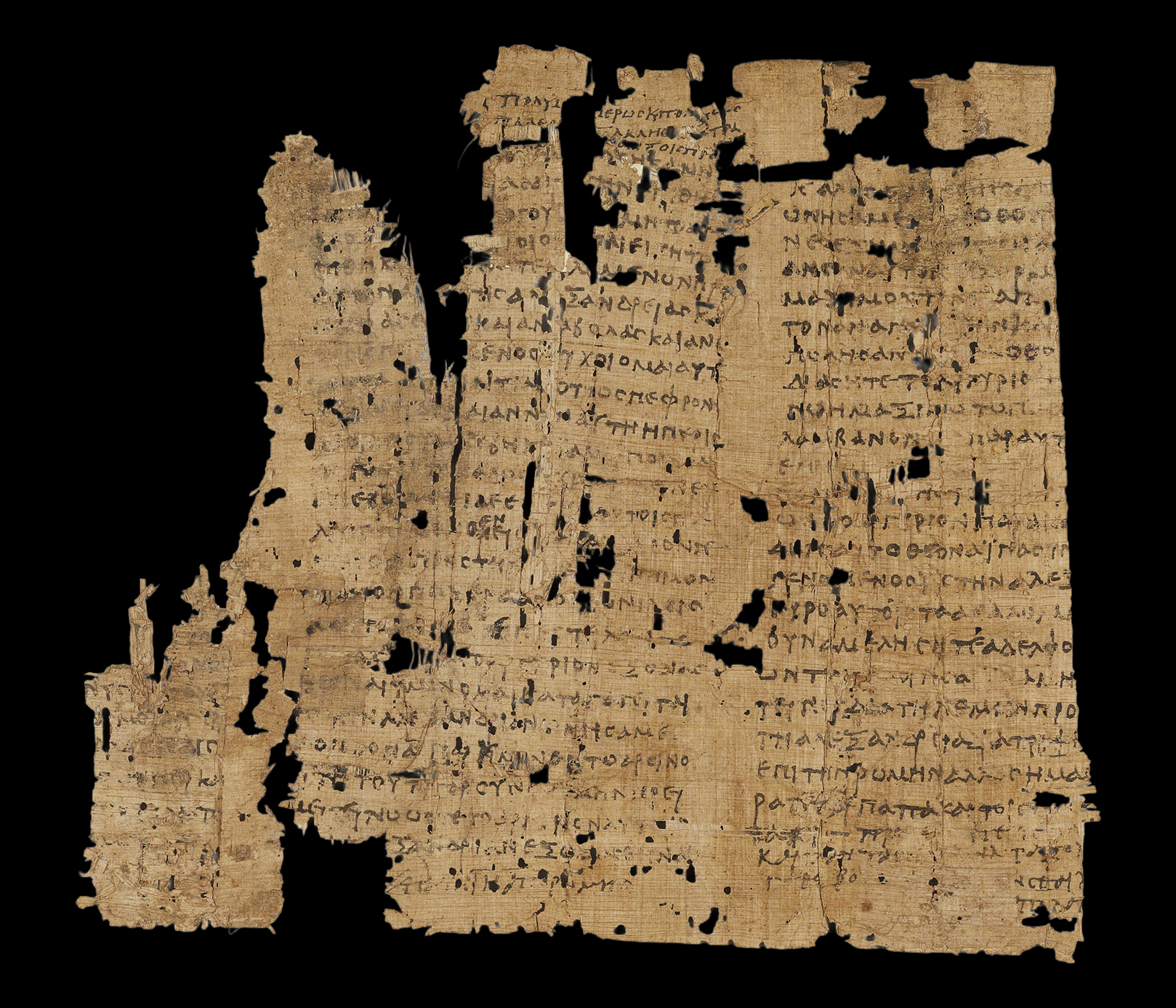
- Papyrus 12 recto - Hebrews 1, 1 and Christian letter from Rome
- Name: P. Amherst 3b
- Text: Epistle to the Hebrews 1 †
- Date: 3rd century
- Script: Greek
- Found: Egypt 1897
- Now at: The Morgan Library & Museum
- Cite: B. P. Grenfell & A. S. Hunt, The Amherst Papyri I, (London 1900), pp. 28-31 (P. Amherst 3 b)
- Size: 20,8 cm x 23 cm
- Type: Alexandrian text-type ?
- Category: I

Papyrus 12 is an early papyrus manuscript copy of the New Testament Epistle to the Hebrews verse 1:1 in Greek. It is designated by the siglum 𝔓^{12} in the Gregory-Aland numbering of New Testament manuscripts, and α 1033 in the von Soden numbering of New Testament manuscripts. Using the study of comparative writing styles (palaeography), it has been assigned to ca. 285. It may have been a writing exercise or an amulet.

== Description ==
The verse has been written at the top of the second column by another (likely later) writer in three lines. It has been written in a small uncial hand. On the reverse side (known as the verso) of this manuscript another writer has penned Genesis 1:1–5 according to the Greek Septuagint.

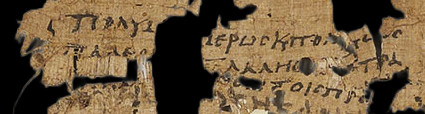
Hebrews 1,1 on Papyrus 12

Text
Greek Text Transcription	Transliteration	English Translation
πολυμερως κ(αι) πολυ[τρο]πως	polymenōs k(ai) poly[tro]pōs	In many parts and in many ways
παλε ο Θ̅Σ̅ λαλήσ[α]ς το[ις π]ατρα	pale ho Theos lalēs[a]s to[is p]atra	long ago God spoke to the fathe-
σ[ιν] ημ[ω]ν εν τοις προ[φ]ητα[ις]	s[in] hēm[ō]n en tois pro[ph]ēta[is]	rs our by the prophets

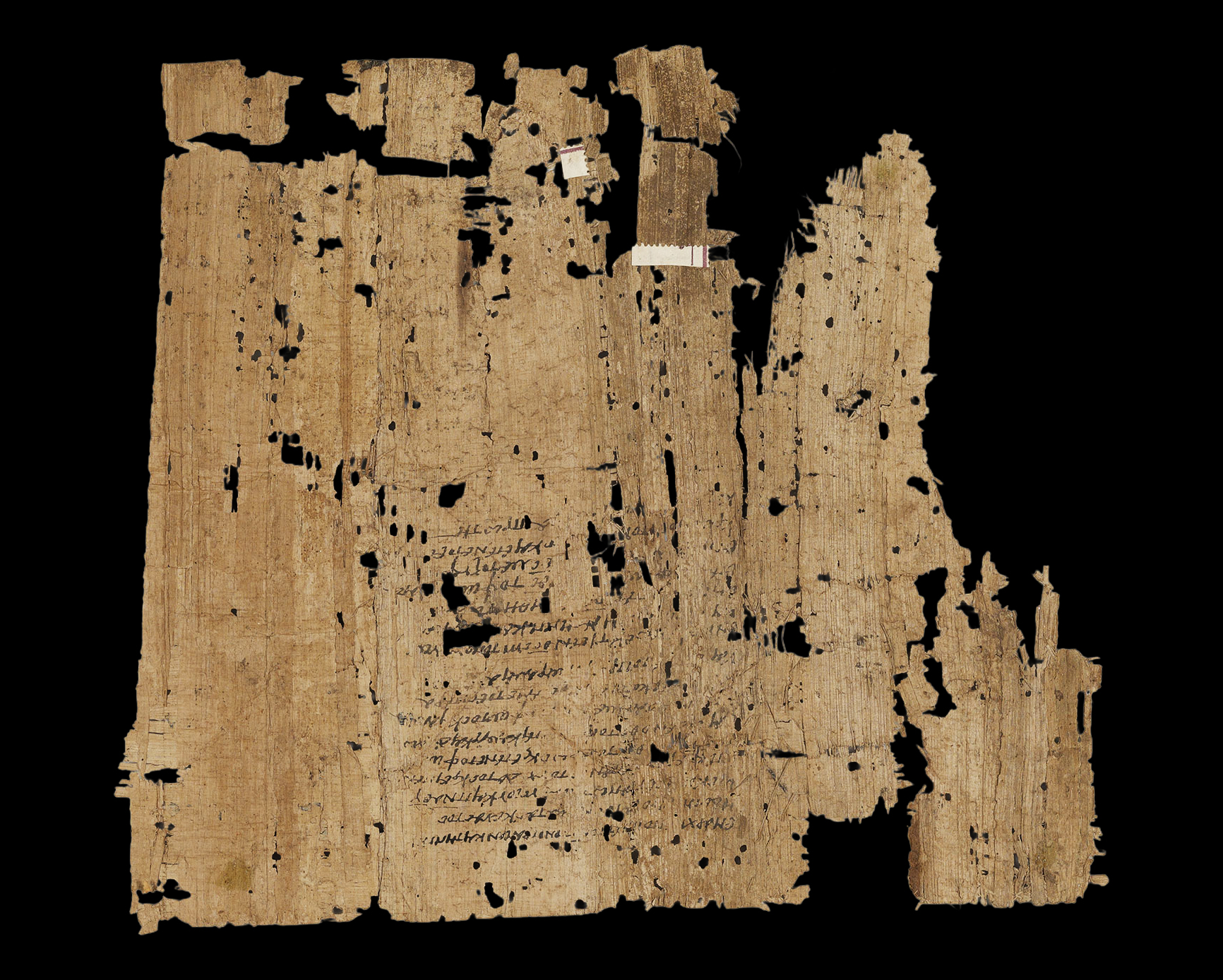
Papyrus 12 verso containing the Septuagint text of Genesis 1, 1–5

It has an error of itacism (παλε instead of παλαι, palai, meaning "long ago, formerly"), and includes the nomen sacrum Θ̅Σ̅ for Theos, "God". The Greek text of this small portion of Hebrews is probably a representative of the Alexandrian text-type, but its text is too brief for certainty. Biblical scholar Kurt Aland placed it in Category I of his New Testament manuscript classification system. It supports the textual variant ημων (hēmōn, "our") as in codices 𝔓^{46}^{c} a t v vg^{mss} syr^{p}.

== History ==
The manuscript was discovered in 1897 by papyrologists Bernard Grenfell and Arthur Hunt in the Fayum, Egypt. It is currently housed at the Morgan Library & Museum (Pap. Gr. 3; P. Amherst 3b) in New York City.

== See also ==
- List of New Testament papyri
- Papyrus Amherst 3a
