= Christian Frederick Boerner =

German theologist (1683–1753)

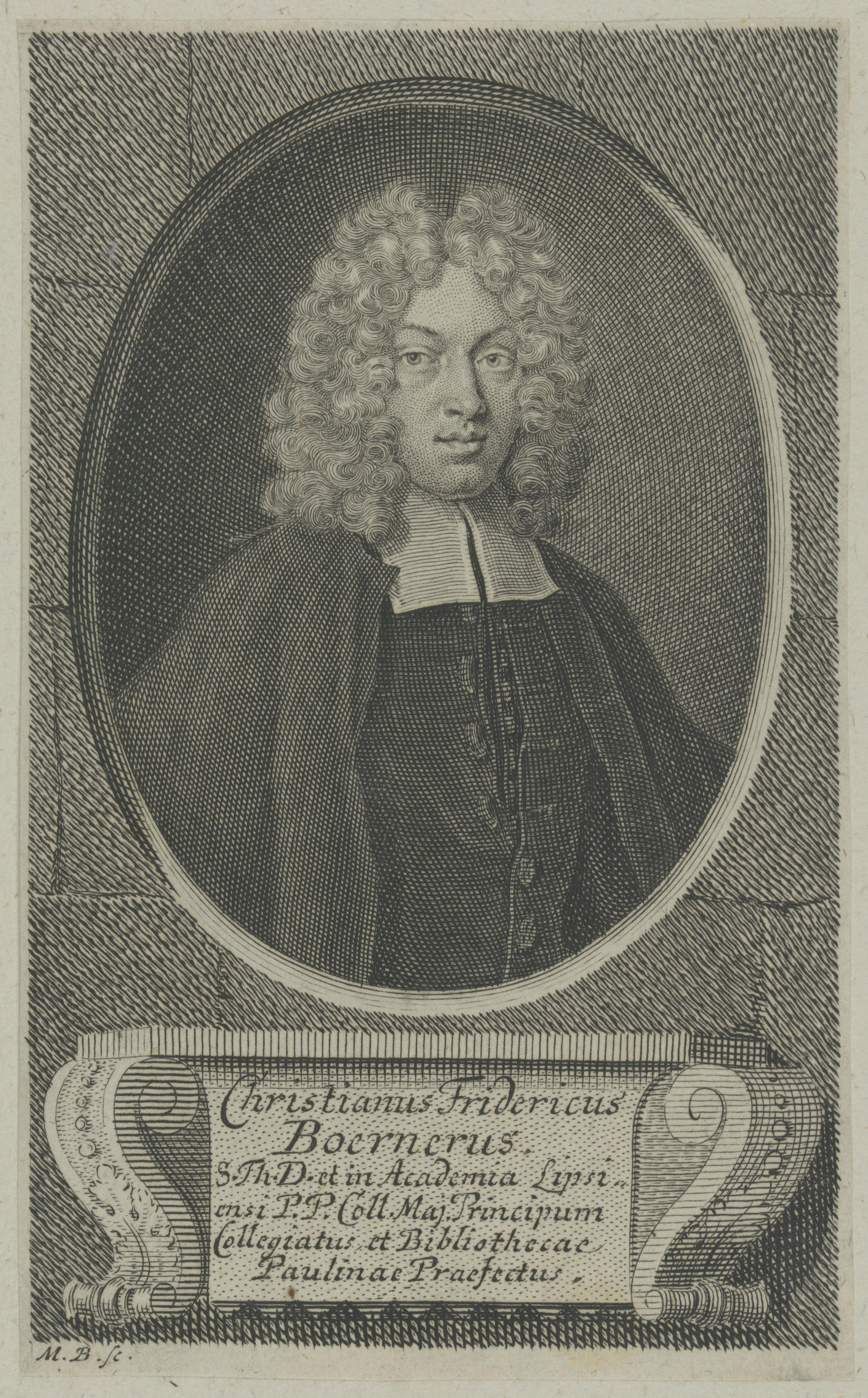
Christian Frederick Boerner

Christian Frederick Boerner (6 November 1683 – 19 November 1753), professor of theology at Leipzig. Boerner was born in Dresden, and lived most of his life in Leipzig. Boerner had two sons, Christian Frederic, and Frederic († 1761), who were both physicians.

Boerner published, from 1728 to 1734, a complete edition of the works of Luther in 22 volumes. He published in 1709 an edition of Le Long's Bibliotheca Sacra at Antwerp in two volumes, with corrections and additions. In 1705 Boerner possessed the manuscript of the New Testament, which is known as Codex Boernerianus.

== Works ==
1. De exulibus Graecis iisdemque litteratum in Italia instauratoribus Leipzig 1704.
2. De ortu atque progressu Philosophiae moralis, Leipzig, 1707.
3. De Socrate, singuli boni ethici exemplo, Leipzig, 1707.
4. De Lutheri actis anno 1520, Leipzig, 1720.
5. De actis Lutheri anno 1521, Leipzig, 1721.
6. Institutiones theologiae symbolicae, Leipzig, 1751.
7. Dissertationes sacrae, Leipzig, 1752.
