= Codex Curiensis =

New Testament manuscript

The Codex Curiensis known also as Fragmenta Curiensia, designated by a^{2} or 16 (in Beuron system), is a 5th-century AD Latin manuscript of the New Testament. The text, written on vellum, is a version of the old Latin. The manuscript contains the fragments of the Gospel of Luke, on exactly two parchment leaves.

It contains a fragments of the Gospel of Luke 11:11-29; 13:16-34. Pierre Batiffol was the first to suggest that these fragments belong to the same manuscript. They were first discovered by Hidber, professor of Berne, then described by E. Ranke.

The Latin text of the codex is a representative of the Western text-type in itala recension.

Currently it is housed at the Rhätisches Museum (Clm 6436) in Chur.

== See also ==
- List of New Testament Latin manuscripts
