= Codex Corbiensis =

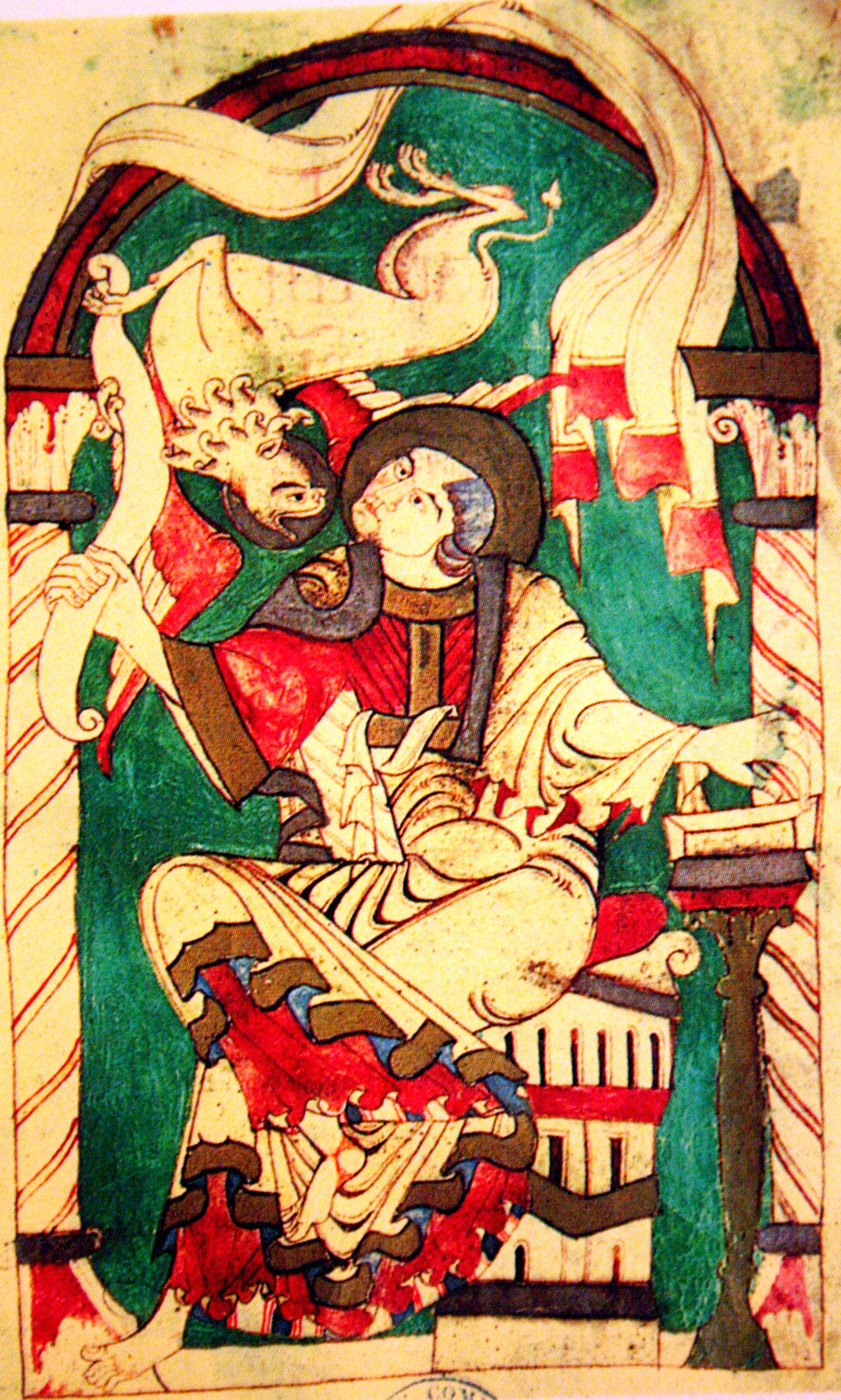
Mark the Evangelist in the Codex Corbiensis

Codex Corbiensis (ff or 66), according to Bruce Metzger, is a mutilated copy of the four Gospels, of the fifth or sixth century, formerly belonging to the monastery of Corbey, near Amiens, and now in the Bibliothèque Nationale at Paris. It contains a form of text akin to that preserved in Codex Vercellensis and Codex Veronensis. Alternatively, it may have been produced in the famous scriptorium of Corbie Abbey in the 9th century and is now held in the Russian National Library, Saint Petersburg (Q. v. I 39). The manuscript includes a copy of an Old Latin (or Vetus Latina) version of the Epistle of James, without lacunae.

== See also ==
- List of New Testament Latin manuscripts
