= Pierre Batiffol =

French theologian and historian (1861–1929)

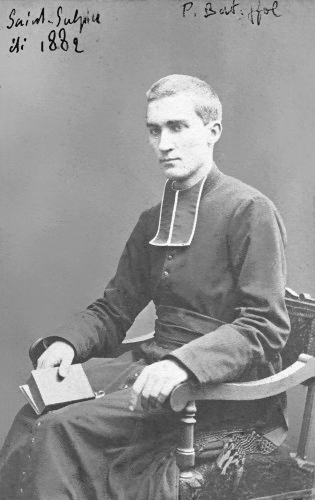
Pierre Batiffol in 1882

Pierre Batiffol (27 January 1861, in Toulouse, France – 13 January 1929, in Paris, France) – was a French Catholic priest and prominent theologian, specialising in Church history. He had also a particular interest in the history of dogma.

Batiffol studied from 1878 at the priest seminary Saint-Sulpice in Paris, was ordained in 1884 and continued his studies at the Institut catholique in Paris and at the Ecole des Hautes Etudes. He was taught by church historian Louis Marie Olivier Duchesne.

Under Giovanni Battista de Rossi in Rome, he studied from 1887 to 1889 the archaeology, research and liturgical antique Christian literature. From 1889 to 1898 and from 1907 until 1929, he lectured at Ecole Sainte-Barbe in Paris. Together with his friend Marie-Joseph Lagrange OP, Batiffol founded in 1892 the magazine Revue Biblique for the historical-critical method of exegesis of the Old and New Testament. In 1899 he founded the Bulletin de littérature ecclésiastique.

In 1898 he became the head of the Institut catholique in Toulouse. He used historical criticism method in his theological research. He applied strict critical method while studying the Church dogma and history as well as manuscripts of the Holy Scripture. He lost his chair in the Institute in the aftermath of the publication of Pascendi dominici gregis (8 September 1907) encyclical of Pope Pius X. That was due particularly to his book on the Eucharist (1905) being put on Index librorum prohibitorum and his affinity to the historical criticism method. He was considered falling into the Catholic modernism.

Batiffol examined Codex Beratinus, Beratinus II, Codex Curiensis, and several other manuscripts. He rediscovered and described Codex Vaticanus 2061 in 1887.

== Works ==
- «Evangeliorum Codex Graecus Purpuraeus Beratinus», in: Mélanges d’archéologie et d’historie (École française de Rome) 5 (1885).
- Les manuscrits grecs de Berat d'Albanie et le Codex Purpureus Φ, Paris 1886.
- Didascalia 318 patrum pseudepigrapha, 1887.
- «Ungedruckte Papst- und Kaiserurkunden aus basilianischen Archiven», in: Römische Quartalschrift für christliche Altertumskunde und Kirchengeschichte, 1888, s. 36
- Studia Patristica I. II, 1889/90
- La Vaticane de Paul III à Paul V, 1890
- L'Abbaye de Rossano (doktoravhandling), 1891
- L'Histoire du bréviaire romain (Paris, 1893)
- Anciennes littératures chrétiennes: La littérature grecque, 1897/1901
- Etudes d'histoire et de théologie positive, 1902/1930
- L'Eucharistie, 1905/1913
- L'Enseignement de Jésus (m. Alfred Loisy), 1905
- L'Avenir prochain du Catholicisme en France, 1907
- L'Eglise naissante et le catholicisme, 1908
- History of the Roman Breviary, (trans. by Atwell M.Y. Baylay) 1912
- La paix constantinienne, 1914
- Leçons sur la messe, 1916
- Etudes de liturgie et d'archéologie chrétienne, 1919
- Le catholicisme de Saint Augustin, 2 vol., 1920
- Les Survivances du Culte Impérial Romain, à propos des rites shintoïstes (1920, sammen Louis Bréhier)
- Le Siège apostolique, 1924
- Saint Grégoire, 1925
- Catholicisme et papauté, 1925.
- Cathedra Petri: Études d'Histoire ancienne de l'Église (utgitt posthumt, 1938)

== See also ==
- Modernism (Roman Catholicism)
