= Codex Parisiensis (Latin 653) =

Codex Parisiensis, also known as Latin No. 653, is a manuscript of the late 4th/early 5th century Church Theologian Pelagius's Commentary on the Letters of Paul in Latin, written on parchment. After the commentary on Philemon, starting from the reverse side of leaf 289, there is a Vulgate version of the Letter to the Hebrews 1:1-4:3 which contains some Old Latin readings. This is labelled as v in the Beuron numbering of Old Latin manuscripts, and VL 81 in the Vetus Latina Register of Latin New Testament manuscripts. Using the study of comparative writing styles (palaeography), it has been assigned to the 8th/9th century CE.

== Description ==
The manuscript is a codex (precursor to the modern book format) containing the text of Pelagius's Commentary on the Letters of Paul, written on 292 parchment folios (584 pages, sized 27cm x 18cm) in black ink with one column and 23 lines per page. On the first page of the manuscript is a short Poem which appears to be addressed to the Roman Emperor Charlemagne, and this manuscript might have been a present to the Emperor himself. On the reverse side of the first page is a table of contents, with the main commentary commencing from the 7th page onwards.

At least three, possibly four copyists worked on the manuscript. Biblical scholar Alexander Souter describes them all as "careful" copyists who showed "great excellence" with their spelling, but with mistakes common to copyists. The commentary itself is mainly that of Pelagius, however there have been expansions to the commentary taken from the writings of Jerome and Pseudo-Jerome.

== Text ==
In comparing the quotations from the Pauline Letters in the manuscript to that of the Latin Vulgate, Souter noted over 200 places where the text differed from the standard Vulgate text. Souter concludes that the manuscript is a very good witness to Pelagius's original commentary, though after it had been brought in partial harmony with the Vulgate, but retaining many of its Old Latin wording. The value of the manuscript is therefore "very great" for the commentary's restoration.

== History ==
The earliest history of the manuscript is unknown. It was likely written in North Italy around 800 CE, at some scriptorium in Verona, or Monza near Millan. Based on spelling and other peculiarities, it is likely the manuscript was copied from an examplar written in Spain. The manuscript was brought from Italy to France during the reign of Henry II of France (reigned 1547-1559), whose coat of arms is stamped on the outer binding.

It has three previous shelf marks written on the reverse side of the second folia, with the earliest (undated) one being DLXXXVIII (1088), second is 628 (year 1645), and the third is 3939 (year 1682). It is currently housed in the National Library of France (shelf number Latin 653) in Paris.

== See also ==
- Vetus Latina manuscripts
