= Codex Boernerianus =

Uncial 012
- New Testament manuscript
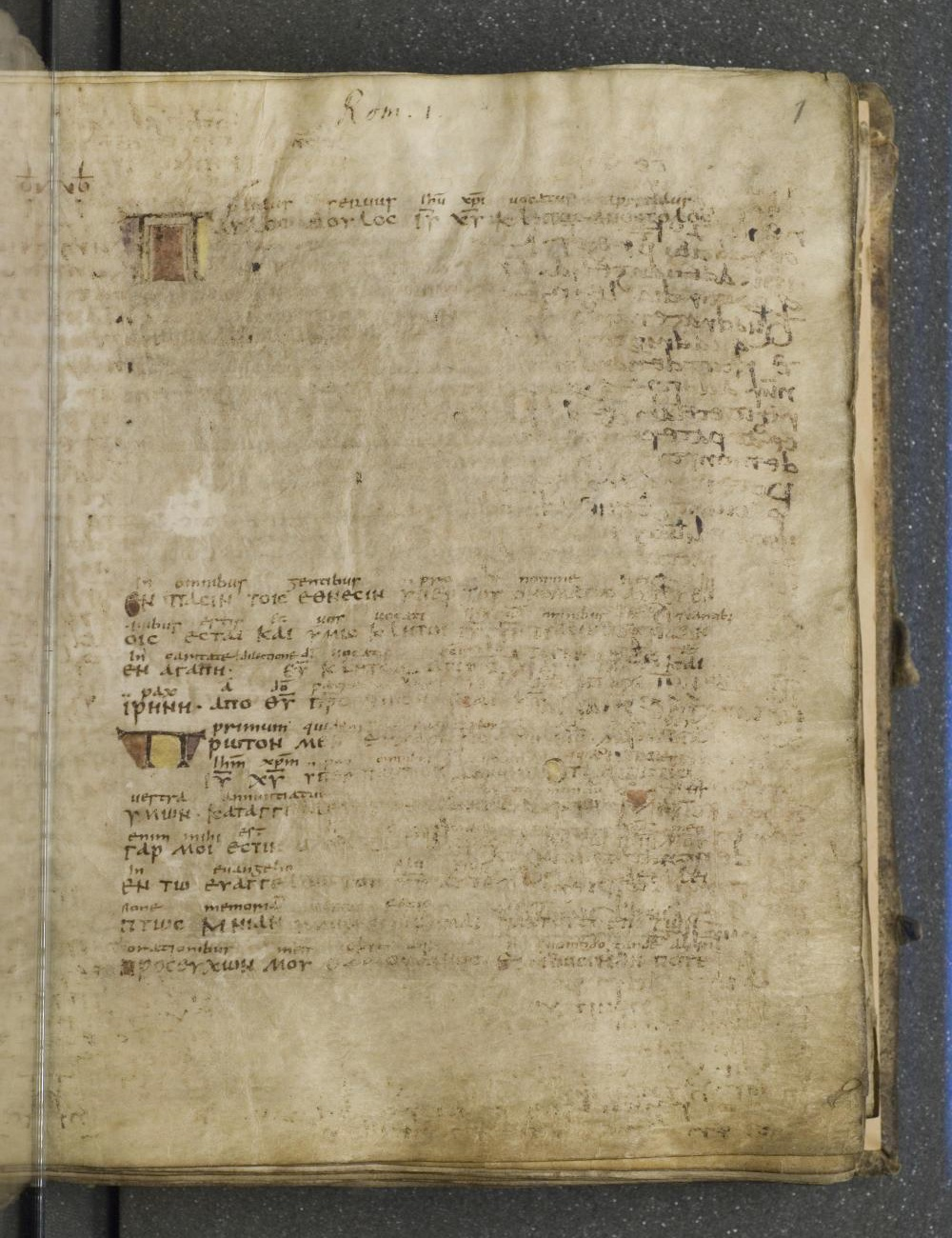
- First page of the codex with lacunae in Romans 1:1-4
- Name: Boernerianus
- Sign: G^{p}, G_{3}
- Text: Pauline epistles
- Date: 850-900
- Script: Greek/Latin diglot
- Found: Abbey of St. Gall, Switzerland
- Now at: Saxon State Library Dresden
- Cite: A. Reichardt, Der Codex Boernerianus. Der Briefe des Apostels Paulus, Verlag von Karl W. Hiersemann, Leipzig 1909.
- Size: 25 x 18 cm
- Type: Western
- Category: III
- Note: Irish verse on folio 23v.

Codex Boernerianus, designated by G^{p}, G_{3} or 012 (in the Gregory-Aland numbering of New Testament manuscripts), α 1028 (in the von Soden numbering of New Testament manuscripts), is a small New Testament manuscript made of parchment which contains the majority of the Pauline epistles. Using the study of comparative writing styles (paleography), the manuscript has been dated to the 9th century CE. The name of the codex derives from the theology professor Christian Frederick Boerner, to whom it once belonged. The manuscript has several gaps.

== Description ==
The manuscript is a codex (precursor to the modern book), containing the text of the Pauline epistles (excluding Hebrews). The text is written in one column per page, 20 lines per page (sized 25 x 18 cm) on 99 vellum leaves. The main text is in Greek with an interlinear Latin translation inserted above the Greek text, in the same manner as Codex Sangallensis 48 (Δ).

The text of the codex contains six gaps (Romans 1:1-4, 2:17-24, 1 Cor. 3:8-16, 6:7-14, Col. 2:1-8, Philem. 21-25). Quotations from the Old Testament are marked in the left-hand margin by inverted commas (>; also known as a diplai), and Latin notation identifies a quotation (f.e. Iesaia / Isaiah). Capital letters follow regular in stichometric frequency. This means the codex was copied from a manuscript arranged in lines (known as στίχοι / stichoi).

The codex sometimes uses minuscule letters: α, κ, ρ (of the same size as the uncials). It does not include rough breathing, smooth breathing or accent markers (usually used to mark stress or pitch). The Latin text is written in minuscule letters. The shape of some of the Latin letters - r, s, and t - is characteristic of the Anglo-Saxon alphabet.

The codex does not include the phrase ἐν Ῥώμῃ (in Rome), with Rom 1:7 employing ἐν ἀγαπῃ (in love) in its stead (Latin text – in caritate et dilectione / in charity and love), and in 1:15 the phrase is omitted entirely in both the Greek and Latin lines.

At the end of the codex, after the end of Philemon, stands the title Προς Λαουδακησας αρχεται επιστολη, with the interlinear Latin reading ad Laudicenses incipit epistola (both mean To the Laodiceans; the beginning of the letter). Below the title, the Latin text of the apocryphal Epistle to the Laodiceans is written - but there is no Greek interlinear text accompanying it.

== Text ==
The Greek text of this codex is considered a representative of the Western text-type. The text-types are groups of different New Testament manuscripts which share specific or generally related readings, which then differ from each other group, and thus the conflicting readings can separate out the groups. These are then used to determine the original text as published; there are three main groups with names: Alexandrian, Western, and Byzantine. Textual critic Kurt Aland placed it in Category III according to his New Testament manuscript text classification system. Category III manuscripts are described as having "a small but not a negligible proportion of early readings, with a considerable encroachment of [Byzantine] readings, and significant readings from other sources as yet unidentified".

The section 1 Corinthians 14:34–35 is placed after 1 Corinthians 14:40, as seen in other manuscripts considered to be of the Western text-type such as Claromontanus (D^{p}), Augiensis (F^{p}), Minuscule 88, it^{d, g}, and some manuscripts of the Latin Vulgate. It also does not contain the ending of Romans (Romans 16:25–27), but it has a blank space at Romans 14:23 for it which was never written.

The Latin text has some affinity with the Latin lectionary manuscript (an edition of the New Testament written in the order according to the weekly readings throughout the Church calendar year, arranged by month), Liber Comicus (t), which is a Latin lectionary containing an Old Latin (Vetus Latina) text.

Some notable readings

Romans 6:5

αμα και της αναστασεως (at the same time also as of the resurrection) : G
αλλα και της αναστασεως (certainly also of the resurrection) : Majority of manuscripts

Romans 8:1

Ιησου (Jesus): G א B D 1739 1881 it^{d, g} sa bo eth
Ιησου μη κατα σαρκα περιπατουσιν αλλα κατα πνευμα (Jesus, not walking around according to the flesh, but according to the Spirit) : Majority of manuscripts

Romans 12:11

καιρω (season) : G
κυριω (Lord) : Majority of manuscripts

Romans 15:31

δωροφορια (gift I bear) : G^{gr} B D
διακονια (gift) : Majority of manuscripts

Romans 16:15

Ιουνιαν (Junias): G C
Ιουλιαν (Julian): Majority of manuscripts

1 Corinthians 2:4

πειθοις σοφιας (plausible wisdom) : G^{gr} 𝔓^{46} F^{p}
πειθοις ανθρωπινης σοφιας λογοις (persuasive words of human wisdom) : א^{2} A C L P Ψ Majority of manuscripts

Galatians 6:2

αναπληρωσετε (you shall fulfill) : G B 1962 it vg sy^{p} sa bo goth eth
αναπληρωσατε (you will have fulfilled) : Majority of manuscripts

Philippians 3:16

το αυτο φρονειν, τω αυτω συνστοιχειν (let us mind the same thing, let us stand in line with the same) : G F
τω αυτω στοιχειν (let us conform to the same) : Majority of manuscripts

Philippians 4:7

σωματα (bodies) : G F
νοηματα (minds) : Majority of manuscripts

== The Old Irish Poem in the Codex Boernerianus ==
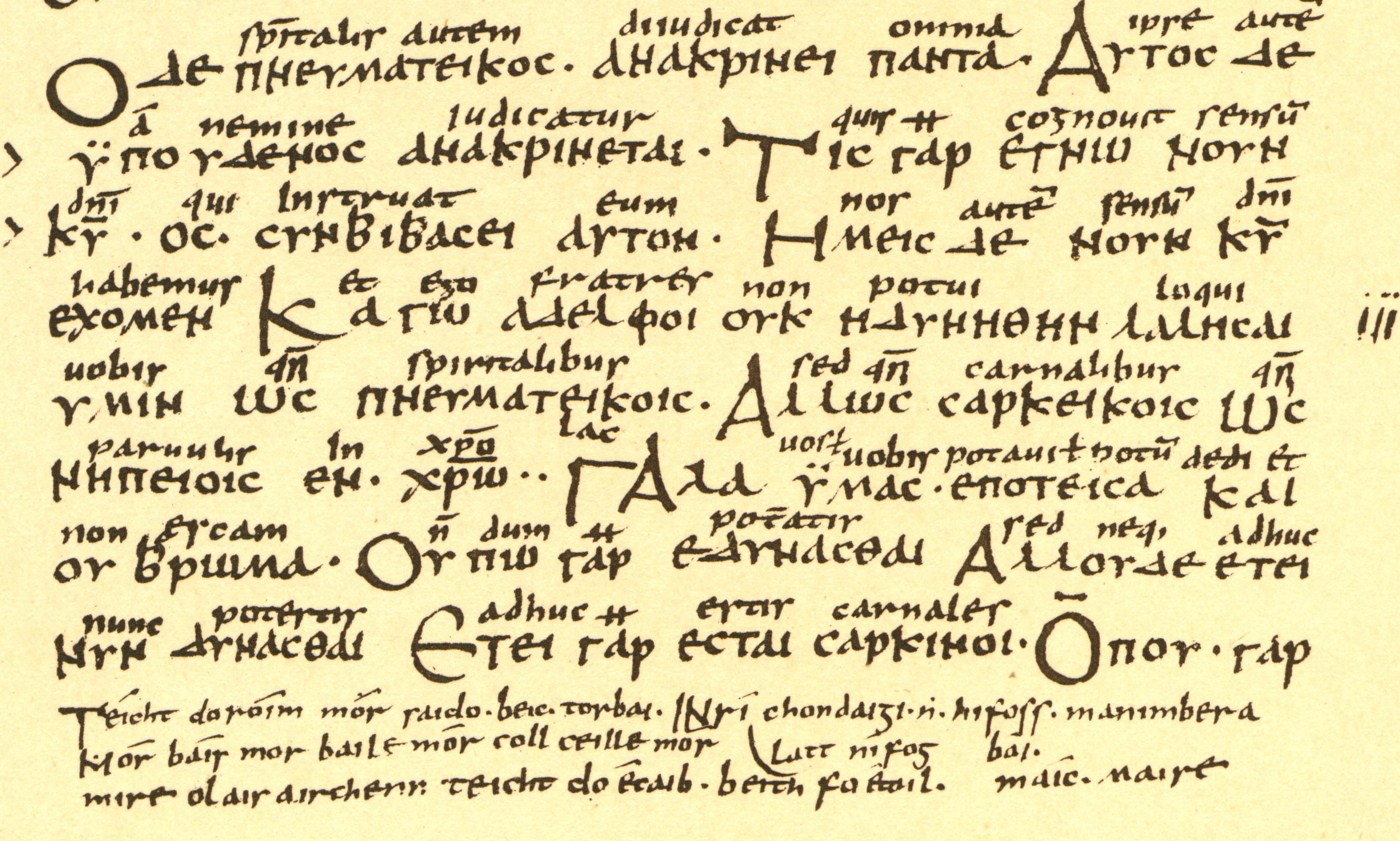
Below biblical text Irish verse (three lines)

On folio 23 verso (the reverse side of the page) at the bottom is written a verse in Old Irish which refers to making a pilgrimage to Rome:

Téicht doróim
mór saido · becc · torbai ·
INrí chondaigi hifoss ·
manimbera latt nífogbái ·

Mór báis mor baile
mór coll ceille mor mire
olais airchenn teicht dó ecaib ·
beith fo étoil · maíc · maire ·

Stokes and Strachan's translation:

To go to Rome, much labour, little profit: the King whom thou seekest here, unless thou bring him with thee, thou findest him not. Much folly, much frenzy, much loss of sense, much madness (is it), since going to death is certain, to be under the displeasure of Mary's Son.

Bruce M. Metzger in his book Manuscripts of the Greek Bible quotes this poem, which seems to have been written by a disappointed pilgrim.

== History ==
The codex was probably written by an Irish monk in the Abbey of St. Gall, Switzerland between 850-900 A.D. Scholar Ludolph Kuster was the first to recognize the 9th century date of Codex Boernerianus. The evidence for this date includes the style of the script, the smaller uncial letters in Greek, the Latin interlinear written in Anglo-Saxon minuscule, and the separation of words.

In 1670 it was in the hands of P. Junius at Leiden. The codex got its name from its first German owner, University of Leipzig professor Christian Frederick Boerner, who bought it in the Dutch Republic in the year 1705. It was collated by Kuster, described in the preface to his edition of Mill's Greek New Testament. The manuscript was designated by symbol G in the second part of Johann Jakob Wettstein's edition of the Greek New Testament. The text of the codex was published by Christian Frederick Matthaei, at Meissen, in Saxony, in 1791, and supposed by him to have been written between the 8th and 12th centuries. Rettig thought that Codex Sangallensis is a part of the same book as the Codex Boernerianus, which some other scholars also believe.

During World War II, the codex suffered severely from water damage. Thus the facsimile as published in 1909 provides the most legible text. The manuscript is housed now in the Saxon State Library (A 145b), Dresden, in Germany, while Δ (037) is at Saint Gallen in Switzerland.

== See also ==
- Codex Augiensis
- List of New Testament Latin manuscripts
- List of New Testament uncials
