= Codex Mediolanensis =

The Codex Mediolanensis or Fragmentum Mediolanense, designated by g^{2} or 52 (in Beuron system), is a 10th- or 11th-century Latin manuscript of the New Testament. The text, written on vellum, is a version of the Vetus Latina. The manuscript contains the fragments of the Gospel of Luke, on only 2 parchment leaves. It was a lectionary.

It contains a fragments of the Acts of the Apostles 6:8-7:2; 7:51-8:4 on two folios. It was published by A. M. Ceriani.

The Latin text of the codex is a representative of the Western text-type in itala recension.

The manuscript was discovered by Ceriani. Currently it is housed at the Ambrosian Library (B. 168) in Milan.

== See also ==
- List of New Testament Latin manuscripts
