= Codex Demidovianus =

13th-century Latin manuscript of the New Testament

The Codex Demidovianus, designated by dem or 59 (in Beuron system), is a 13th-century Latin manuscript of the New Testament. The text, written on vellum, is a version of the old Latin. The manuscript contains the text of the New Testament (except Gospels).

== Description ==
It contains the text of the Acts of the Apostles, Pauline epistles, Catholic epistles, and Book of Revelation. It contained Euthalian Apparatus to the Pauline epistles and commentary to the Apocalypse.

In the 18th century the manuscript belonged to a certain Paul Demidov Gregorovitch, then to his sons. The present location of the codex is unknown. It is certainly the Vulgate, with Old Latin readings in Acts, Catholic epistles and Pauline epistles. It was edited by Matthaei.

== See also ==
- List of New Testament Latin manuscripts
