= Codex Sangermanensis II =

10th-century manuscript of the New Testament

The Codex Sangermanensis II, designated by g^{2} or 29 (in Beuron system), is a 10th-century Latin manuscript of the New Testament. The text, written on vellum, is a version of the Latin.

== Description ==
The manuscript contains text of the four Gospels on 166 parchment leaves (21.5 x 14 cm).

The Latin text of the Gospels is a mixed of Old Latin and Vulgate.

== History ==
It was examined by Samuel Berger, Paul Sabatier, and John Wordsworth. Sabatier published its text. Currently it is housed at the National Library of France (fond lat. 13169) in Paris.

== See also ==
- List of New Testament Latin manuscripts
- Codex Sangermanensis I
- Codex Gatianum
