= Astarte and the Insatiable Sea =

Hieratic text about Canaanite deities

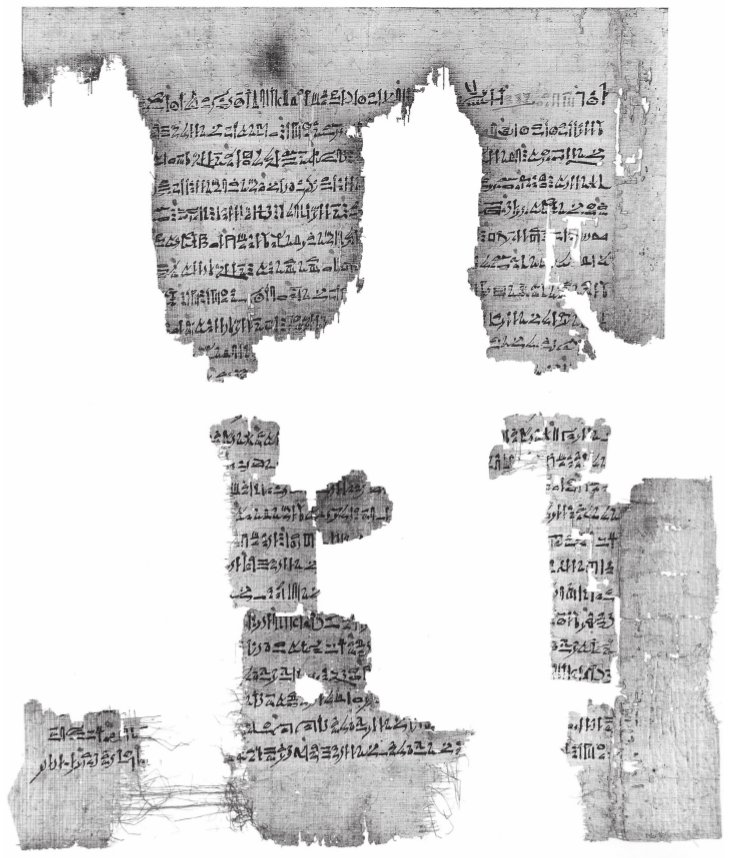
Astarte Papyrus

Astarte and the Sea (also pAmherst IX or simply the Astarte Papyrus) is an Egyptian hieratic tale, dating from the New Kingdom, which relates a story about the goddess Astarte and her rival Yam. Though Astarte and Yam appear to have originated as Canaanite deities, both were, at times, worshipped in ancient Egypt as well.

== Contents ==
Yam, a deity who is a personification of the sea, demands tribute from the gods. If his demands are not met, he will overrun the "sky, earth, and mountains." Astarte brings tribute from Ptah, Nut, and Renenutet, who were native deities. Yam changes the deal: he wants her as his wife and divine jewelry that would grant him lordship over the world.

The conclusion to the tale is inferred from a papyrus fragment which mentions the god Seth, who appears to triumph over Yam.

== Scholarship ==
Interpretation has been a matter of continuous tweaking and addition.

=== History ===
This narrative was unnoticed until the photographic edition of Percy E Newberry in 1899, after first mention in 1871.

=== Epistemic bind ===
The difficulty of study according to Pehal:

On the one hand, we want to identify as precisely as possible these devices “-emically,” i.e., within the frame of reference provided by that culture’s own linguistic or literary practice. On the other hand, to help us achieve this goal, we can rely only on “-etic” hermneutic categories derived from our own theoretical horizon.

== Bibliography ==
- Pehal, Martin (2014-01-01). "Interpreting ancient Egyptian narratives: A structural analysis of the Tale of Two Brothers, the Anat Myth, the Osirian Cycle, and the Astarte Papyrus". ResearchGate.
