= Codex Sangermanensis I =

Old Latin manuscript of the Bible

The Codex Sangermanensis I, designated by g^{1} or 7 (in Beuron system), is a Latin manuscript, dated AD 822 of portions of the Old Testament and the New Testament. The text, written on vellum, is a version of the Latin. The manuscript contains the Vulgate Bible, on 191 leaves (39.3 by 33 cm) of which, in the New Testament, the Gospel of Matthew contain Old Latin readings. It contains Shepherd of Hermas.

== Description ==
It contains the Euthalian Apparatus to the Catholic and Pauline epistles.

The Latin text of the Gospels is a representative of the Western text-type in Itala recension, and has a strong admixture of Old Latin elements. The rest of the New Testament presents a very good Vulgate text; in Revelation "without question the best" surviving witness. The Order of books in New Testament: Gospels, Acts, Catholic epistles, Apocalypse, and Pauline epistles.

== Old Testament ==
It contains also some books of the Old Testament and Apocrypha (Par, Esr, Est, Prv, Sap, Sir). The Stuttgart Vulgate cites it as G in the New and Old Testaments and as S in the appendix. It is one of only three exemplars of the Vetus Latina version of 1 Esdras, the others being Codex Colbertinus and Vercelli Archivio Capitolare codex XXII. Sangermanensis, however, only witnesses to the first four chapters, since it ends at 5:3.

=== "The Missing Fragment" from II Esdras ===
It was an important exemplar in the textual history of 2 Esdras (in the Latin Vulgate and many references this is called the Fourth Book of Esdras/of Ezra - the first two being the canonical books better known as Ezra and Nehemiah) and, indeed, in all studies of textual criticism. In Second Esdras, chapter 7, verse 35, the majority of surviving Latin manuscripts read "... et justitiae vigilabunt, et injustitiae non dormibunt. primus Abraham propter Sodomitas et Moyses...", creating an awkward transition which, in the King James Version (1611), reads:

"... good deeds shall be of force, and wicked deeds shall bear no rule. [verse 36] Then said
I, Abraham prayed first for the Sodomites, and Moses for ...."

In 1865, Johann Gildemeister (1812-1890), later Professor of Oriental Languages at the University of Bonn, discovered that dormibunt was the last word of one leaf of the Codex Sangermanensis and primus (with a small P) the beginning word on the next leaf - but that one leaf which had once been between them had been cut out of the Codex. It would appear that the vast majority of Latin manuscripts had derived, more or less in a line of descent, from the Sangermanensis text after it had been mutilated (indicating that the page had been cut out very early in the volume's history, perhaps within a very few decades of its writing in AD 822). Prof. Gildemeister "drew the indisputable and highly important conclusion that all manuscripts of [Second Esdras] which do not contain that passage were ultimately derived from the Codex Sangermanensis."

This lacuna propagated into print in early editions of the Bible such as the Clementine Vulgate and the King James Version. These "missing verses" were not available in print until Robert L. Bensly published the Latin text from the Codex Colbertinus in 1875 and, after Bensly's death in 1893, Cambridge published his critical edition of the whole Latin text of 4 Ezra in 1895, and it is this Latin text that is used in the Stuttgart edition of the Latin Vulgate. Bensly's text was also the basis for the translation which was included in the English Revised Version of the Bible, the Apocrypha being printed in 1894 (Bensly had been a member of the Apocrypha committee). There, in the 1894 Revised Version, this passage read:

... good deeds shall awake, and wicked deeds shall not sleep. [newly recovered verse 36] And the pit of torment shall appear ....

{This is followed by seventy verses describing the horrors in the next world that await the vast majority of people then alive}

... for then shall all bear every one his own righteousness or unrighteousness. [old verse 36, now numbered 106] And I answered
and said, How do we now find that first Abraham prayed for the people of Sodom, and Moses for the ....

This restoration of the text from other Latin manuscripts is confirmed by other ancient versions in Syriac, Ethiopic, Arabic and Armenian.

It is theorized that the page was cut out from the Codex Sangermanensis because of its very discouraging account of the hideous fate awaiting most people and its statement that the prayers of others on their behalf would be unavailing.

== Gospel of Matthew ==
In Matthew 3:15 it has addition: Et cum baptizaretur Ihs lumen magnum fulgebat de aqua · ita ut timerent omnes qui congregati erant ·. In Matthew 3:16 it has addition: dicentes vae vobis quae facta sunt hodiae propter peccata nostra. adpropinquauit enim desolatio hierusalem.

In Matthew 8:13 (see Luke 7:10) it has additional text Et conuersus centurio in domum suam eadem hora inuenit puerum sanum corresponding to the Greek: και υποστρεψας ο εκατονταρχος εις τον οικον αυτου εν αυτη τη ωρα ευρεν τον παιδα υγιαινοντα (and when the centurion returned to the house in that hour, he found the slave well) — Codex Sinaiticus, C, (N), Θ, (0250), f^{1}, (33, 1241), syr^{h}.

== History ==
The manuscript used to be held in the Library of St. Germain des Pres (15). The manuscript was known for Robert Estienne, who used it in his edition of Latin Bible, published in 1538-1540 and again in 1546, quotes as Germ. Lat. It was examined by Richard Simon, Giuseppe Bianchini, published by Petrus Sabatier and John Wordsworth. It is housed at the National Library of France (fond lat. 11504-505) in Paris.

== See also ==
- List of New Testament Latin manuscripts
- Codex Sangermanensis II
- Codex Gatianum
