= Codex Complutensis I =

10th century Bible codex

The Codex Complutensis I, designated by C, is a 10th-century codex of the Christian Bible. It is written on vellum with Latin text mainly following the Vulgate. Parts of the Old Testament present an Old Latin version.

== Description ==
The Latin text of the Gospels is a representative of the Spanish type of Vulgate, but with peculiar readings in the Epistles and Acts. In some portions of the Old Testament it represents the Old Latin version (Book of Ruth, Book of Esther, Book of Tobit, Book of Judith, 1-2 Maccabees).

It contains apocryphal 4 Book of Esdra. It contains an Epistle to the Laodiceans, which follows after Epistle to the Hebrews, not Colossians as in other Spanish Bibles.

It contains the much debated texts of the Pericope Adultera (John 7:53-8:11) and Comma Johanneum (1 John 5:7).

== History ==
According to the colophon the manuscript was written in 927.

The manuscript was purchased by Cardinal Ximenes and used by him in editing the Complutensian Polyglot Bible. It was examined by Samuel Berger and Westcott.

During the Spanish Civil War (1936–1939) it was almost totally destroyed. The little that still remains is in the Library of the Facultad de Filosofía y Letras (Centr. 31) in Madrid. In 2010, a complete third-generation copy on microfilm was discovered in a library in Collegeville, Minnesota.

The Pontifical Abbey of St Jerome-in-the-City in Rome housed a facsimile of the entire manuscript. The manuscript is currently housed in the library of the Faculdad de Filosofia y Letras in Madrid (shelf number Bibl. Univ. Cent. 31).

== See also ==
- List of New Testament Latin manuscripts
