= Phototype =

Phototype can refer to:

- Metal printing block, sometimes prepared using photogravure to reproduce a photograph in printing.
- Type set using a phototypesetting process to prepare pages for photo lithography. This process replaced hot metal typesetting.
- A synonym for collotype, from the French term phototypie for the process
- Skin phototype that depends on the amount of melanin pigment in the skin defined by the Fitzpatrick scale

== See also ==
-
