= Pierre Sabatier (Maurist) =

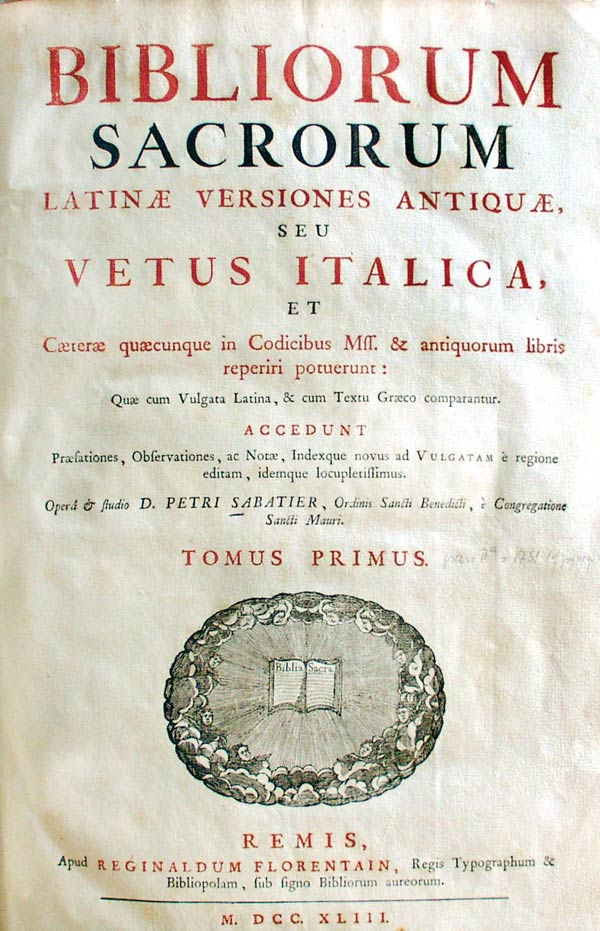
Bibliorum sacrorum latinae versiones antiquae, title page of volume I dated 1743, but published 1749

Pierre Sabatier (1682–1742), or Petrus was a French Maurist scholar.

Sabatier joined the Benedictine Order in 1700, at Reims. At the Abbey of St-Germain-des-Prés he studied under Thierry Ruinart. He was moved to Reims in 1727, under suspicion of Jansenist sympathies.

== Biblical scholar ==
Sabatier concentrated on the Vetus Latina: the corpus of Latin biblical manuscripts predating the Vulgate of Jerome, the version begun in 382 CE. He edited Bibliorum sacrorum latinae versiones antiquae, published posthumousl from 1749.
