= Carlo Vercellone =

Italian biblical scholar

Carlo Vercellone (10 January 1814 – 19 January 1869) was an Italian biblical scholar.

== Biography ==
Carlo was born at Biella. He entered the Order of the Barnabites at Genoa, in 1829; studied philosophy at Turin and theology at Rome, under Luigi Ungarelli.

He taught the sacred sciences at Alessandria, Turin, Perugia and Parma.

In 1847, was made president of the college of the Barnabites at Rome, a position which he held together with the charge first of procurator, and then superior general of his order, and with various offices in several Roman Congregations, until his death in Rome on 19 January 1869 at the age of 55.

== Works ==
His first publication was (1857) the edition (5 quarto volumes) of the Vatican manuscript (B) of the Scriptures prepared by Cardinal Mai under the auspices of Leo XII and printed from 1828 to 1838, to which he added by way of preface a letter to the reader.

That this edition was far from perfect, Mai himself had well realized, and Vercellone publicly acknowledged in the above-mentioned letter; he at once set out to have it corrected mainly from Mai's notes, the outcome of his labours being a new octavo edition of the New Testament (Rome, 1859), prefaced by an epistle. A few months before, a poor reprint of the New Testament edition of 1857 had been struck off at Leipzig for a London firm. Yet critics persisted in thinking a new and accurate edition of the "Vaticanus" was imperatively needed, and Pius IX manifested his intention to carry out the design and entrust it to Vercellone. The latter helped Tischendorf in the preparation of his "Nov. Test. Vat." (Leipzig, 1867).

In 1868 appeared the first volume of the "Bibliorum sacrorum graecus codex vaticanus, auspice PIO IX...editus", the work of Vercellone and the Basilian monk Giuseppe Cozza-Luzi; the second volume (Genesis-Josue) followed in 1869, shortly before Vercellone's death, and the others in 1870, 1871, 1872, and 1881, Gaetano Sergio and Canon Enrico Fabiani having replaced Vercellone.

Vercellone's critical studies on the text of the Latin Vulgate, although he brought the work only as far as IV Kings, contributed more to his fame than the editing of the Vatican manuscript. These studies, with important and valuable prolegomena, appeared (2 volumes, 1860–64) under the title, "Variae lectiones Vulgatae latinae editionis Bibliorum", and may be said to have paved the way for the revision of the Vulgate.

As preparatory to his edition of the Greek Bible, Vercellone wrote "Ulteriori studii sul N. T. greco dell' antichissimo Cod. Vaticano" (Rome, 1866); in 1867 he published a critical study, "La Storia dell' adultera nel Vangelo di s. Giovanni" (Rome), in which he defended the authenticity of the passage (John 7:53-8:11).

He also edited nine pamphlets of Gerdil on the Hierarchy of the Church.

In 1869 he published a "Discours sur l'histoire des langues semitiques de Renan", in which he refuted some of the assertions of the French critic.
