= Donatien de Bruyne =

Donatien de Bruyne (1871–1935) was a Belgian biblical scholar, textual critic. He was first a secular priest, then a monk at the Benedictine abbey of Maredsous.

He was born on 7 October 1871 in Nieuwkerke (Belgian province of West Flanders), ordained in 1895. De Bruyne examined and collated hundreds of Latin medieval manuscripts of the Vulgate and ancient biblical exegesis (e.g. Codex Frisingensis, Codex Carinthianus) in the context of the preparation of the critical edition of the Vulgate. From 1907 he lives in Rome as member of the "Commission de la revision de la Vulgate".

De Bruyne questioned Jerome's authorship of the Pauline epistles of Vulgate. According to him Pelagius prepared the Pauline epistles.

De Bruyne discovered and published in 1930 an anti-Marcionist Prologue to the Gospel of John.

== Works ==
- Une Concordance Biblique d’Origine Pélagiense Revue Biblique 5 (1908), pp. 75–83.
- Sommaires, divisions et rubriques de la Bible latine (Namur, 1914).
- Étude sur les origines de notre texte latin de saint Paul, Revue Biblique 12 (1915), pp. 358–392.
- Sommaires, divisions et rubriques de la Bible latin (Namur, 1914)
- Préfaces de la Bible latine (Namur, 1920)
- Les fragments de Freising (épîtres de S. Paul et épîtres catholiques), Rome, Bibliothèque Vaticane, 1921.
- Les plus anciens prologues latins des Évangiles, Revue benedictine 40 (1928).
- Nouveaux Sermons de Saint Pierre Chrysologue, Journal of Theological Studies 29 (1928), pp. 362–368.
