= Codex Sangallensis 60 =

The Codex Sangallensis 60, designated by 47 on the Beuron system, is an 8th-century Latin manuscript of the New Testament. The text is written on vellum. The manuscript contains the text of the Gospel of John 1:29–3:26 on 35 parchment leaves (27 × 18 ½ cm). It contains the Ammonian Sections and Eusebian Canons; it uses abbreviations.

The Latin text of the Gospel of John 1:29–3:26 is a representative of the Western text-type in Itala recension. The text of the rest part of the Gospel represents Vulgate, although there are also some non-Vulgate readings in other parts of the Gospel of John.

The codex was written in the West, possibly in the St. Gallen monastery, by an Irish monk in the 8th century. It is located in the Abbey library of St. Gallen (60) at St. Gallen.

== See also ==
- List of New Testament Latin manuscripts
