= Codex Augiensis =

Uncial 010
- New Testament manuscript
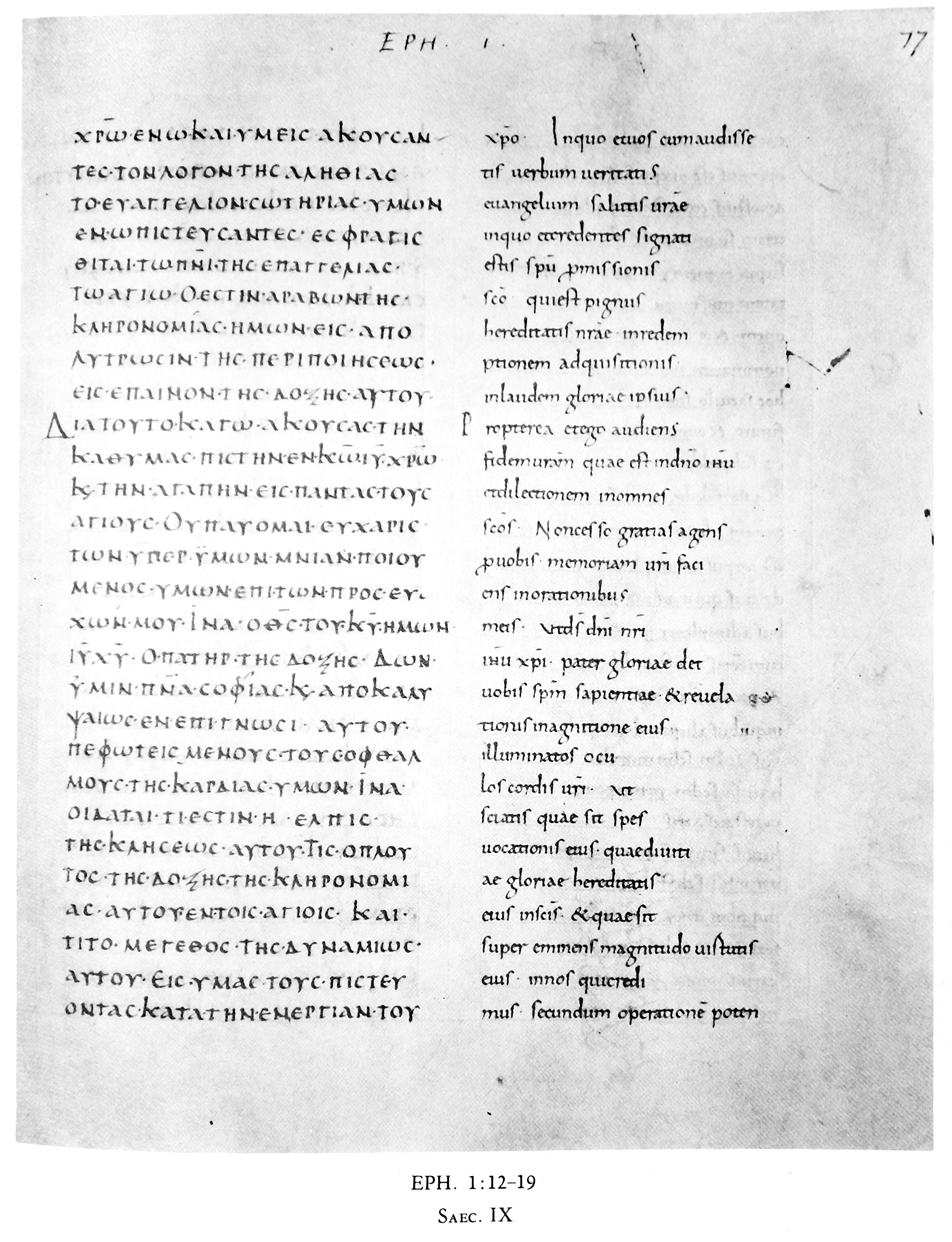
- Name: Augiensis
- Sign: F^{p}
- Text: Pauline Epistles
- Date: c. 850
- Script: Greek-Latin diglot
- Now at: Cambridge
- Size: 23 cm by 19 cm
- Type: Western text-type
- Category: II

Codex Augiensis, designated by F^{p} or 010 (in the Gregory-Aland numbering), α 1029 (von Soden) is a 9th-century diglot uncial manuscript of the Pauline Epistles in double parallel columns of Greek and Latin on the same page.

== Description ==
The codex contains 136 parchment leaves (23 cm by 19 cm), with some gaps in the Greek (Romans 1:1-3:19, 1 Corinthians 3:8-16, 6:7-14, Colossans 2:1-8, Philemon 21–25, Hebrews). Hebrews is given in Latin only. It is written in two columns per page, 28 lines per page.

== Text ==
=== Textual character ===
The Greek text of this codex is a representative of the Western text-type. According to Kurt and Barbara Aland it agrees with the Byzantine standard text 43 times, and 11 times with the Byzantine when it has the same reading as the original text. It agrees 89 times with the original text against the Byzantine. It has 70 independent or distinctive readings. Alands placed it in Category II.

=== Textual features ===
In Romans 12:11 it reads καιρω for κυριω, the reading of the manuscript is supported by Codex Claromontanus*, Codex Boernerianus 5 it ^{d,g}, Origen^{lat}.

In 1 Corinthians 2:4 the Latin text supports reading πειθοι σοφιας (plausible wisdom), as 35 and Codex Boernerianus (Latin text).

In 1 Corinthians 7:5 it reads τη προσευχη (prayer) along with 𝔓^{11}, 𝔓^{46}, א*, A, B, C, D, G, P, Ψ, 6, 33, 81, 104, 181, 629, 630, 1739, 1877, 1881, 1962, it vg, cop, arm, eth. Other manuscripts read τη νηστεια και τη προσευχη (fasting and prayer) or τη προσευχη και νηστεια (prayer and fasting) – 330, 451, John of Damascus.

The section 1 Cor 14:34-35 is placed after 1 Cor 14:40, like other manuscripts of the Western text-type (Claromontanus, Boernerianus, 88, it^{d, g}, and some manuscripts of Vulgate).

=== Relationship to Codex Boernerianus ===
The Greek text of both manuscripts is almost the same; the Latin text differs. Also, lacunae omissions are paralleled to the sister manuscript Codex Boernerianus. According to Griesbach, Augiensis was recopied from Boernerianus. According to Tischendorf, two codices were recopied from the same manuscript. Scrivener enumerated 1982 differences between these two codices. Among textual scholars, there is a tendency to prefer Augiensis above Boernerianus. The codex is also similar to Codex Claromontanus, and again scholars favour the readings in Augiensis above those in Claromontanus.

== History ==
Codex Augiensis is named after the monastery of Augia Dives in Lake Constance. In 1718 Richard Bentley (1662–1742) was its owner. The Greek text of the codex was edited by Scrivener in 1859. It was examined, described, and collated by Tischendorf. E. M. Thompson edited a facsimile.

The codex today is located in the library of Trinity College (Cat. number: B. XVII. 1) in Cambridge.

== See also ==
- List of New Testament uncials
- List of New Testament Latin manuscripts
- Textual criticism
