= CGM =

CGM most often refers to:

- Continuous glucose monitor, a monitoring device for people with diabetes

CGM may also refer to:

- CGM (rap group), a British hip hop collective
- Camiguin Airport's IATA code
- Cassava green mite
- Chloë Grace Moretz, an American actress
- Providence (religious movement), whose official name translates as Christian Gospel Mission
- Codex germanicus monacensis, a German-language manuscript in the Bavarian State Library in Munich
- Compagnie Générale Maritime, a French shipping line
- Computer Games Magazine
- Computer Graphics Metafile
- Conjugate gradient method, an algorithm for the numerical solution of particular systems of linear equations
- Conspicuous Gallantry Medal
- Corn gluten meal
- CTVglobemedia, a Canadian media conglomerate
- Consumer generated media
