= Papyrus Amherst 3a =

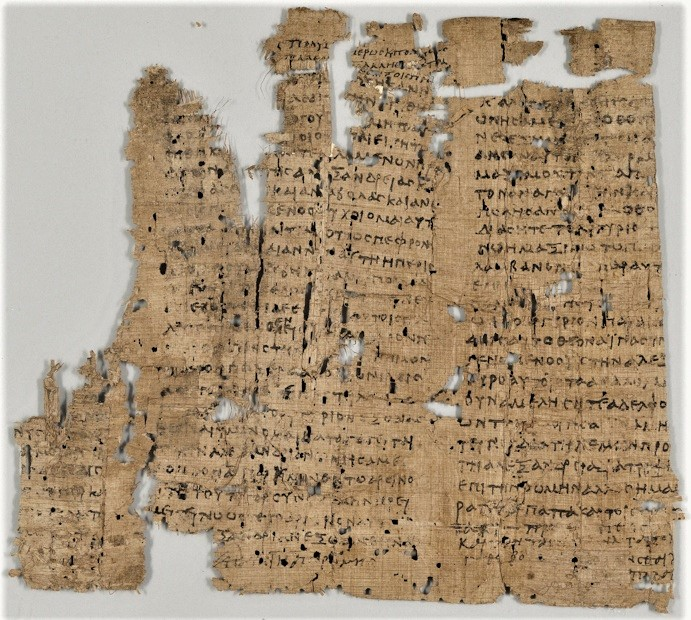
Papyrus Amherst 3a, Letter from Rome

Papyrus Amherst 3a is a fragment of a letter from Rome of an unknown author, written in Greek. The manuscript was written on papyrus in the form of a scroll. It is dated to the third century. It was discovered by Grenfell and Hunt. It is one from the earliest Christian documents. A certain Maximus the pope is mentioned in this document (probably a patriarch of Alexandria or pope of Rome).

The measurements of the fragment are 209 by 235 mm.

It belonged to the private collection of Lord Amherst in Norfolk. In 1908/1909 Lord Amherst sold his library.

== See also ==
- Papyrus 12 – Papyrus Amherst 3b
