= Vergilius Sangallensis =

The Codex Vergilius Sangallensis is a manuscript which was written in the 4th century or 5th century, though it has survived only in fragments.

== Historical background ==
The Vergilius Sangallensis most likely came to the Abbey library of Saint Gall during the Carolingian Renaissance, possibly under Abbot Grimald, the arch-chaplain of Louis the German. In 1461, the manuscript was reused for the restoration of other manuscripts' covers (Cod. Sang. 22; Cod. Sang. 248; Cod. Sang. 275) under the order of abbot Ulrich Rösch. The existing remains were bound into the first volume of a collected manuscript, consisting of fragments from various manuscripts, though the page sequence is disrupted by their faulty arrangement and the stapling of blank pages in between. Only 12 pages out of about 340 are still preserved, some only fragmentary (8 fragments), some having been turned into palimpsests sometime in the 12th or 13th century.

The manuscript is currently being kept in the Abbey library of Saint Gall under the signature Codex Sangallensis 1394 (further material in Cod. Sang. 63 and Cod. Sang. 275). In the editions, it is registered under the nomenclature G. Due to its early creation, the manuscript is considered a highly important textual witness. However, there are also a few other Virgil manuscripts from Late Antiquity aside from the Vergilius Sangallensis.

== Description and content ==
The parchment of the manuscript is thin and translucent. The reconstructed page format consists of a height of approx. 35 cm. and a width of 32.5 cm. The pages have wide margins and contain a vertical-format script written solely in Roman square capitals, without any decorations to the initials. The text is structured into 19 verses per page with interlinear corrections.

As for its content, the Vergilius Sangallensis encompasses works by the Roman poet Virgil (p. 35: Eclogae, Colophon and Georgica, Titulus; pp. 39/40, 43/44, and 47/48: Georgica (fragmentary); pp. 7/8, 11/12, 16/15, 20/19, 23/24, 27/28, 49, 31/32: Aeneid (fragmentary)).

== Bibliography ==
- Götte, Johannes, ed. (1958). Aeneis. München: Heimeran Verlag. pp. 590–595.
- Seider, Richard (1976). "Beiträge zur Geschichte und Paläographie der antiken Vergilhandschriften [Contributions to the History and Palaeography of the Ancient Virgil Manuscripts]". In Görgemanns, Herwig; Schmidt, Ernst A. (eds.). Studien zum antiken Epos [Studies on the ancient epic] (in German). Vol. 72. Meisenheim am Glan: Hain Verlag. pp. 129–172.
