= Liber Comicus =

A Latin Bible lectionary

Liber Comicus Toletanus Teplensis (also spelled Commicus), designated by t or 56 (in Besaurion system), is the oldest known lectionary from the Iberian Peninsula, dated to somewhere between the 7th and 9th centuries. The Latin text of the New Testament is not of the Vulgate but of the Vetus Latina. "Taken in its context, liber comicus could not possibly mean a comic book ... this term is sometimes used to denote a lectionary." It has some affinity with Codex Boernerianus.

== See also ==
- List of New Testament Latin manuscripts

== Select bibliography ==
- Baldwin, Spurgeon. 'On the meaning of the term "Liber Commicus."' Traditio 39 (1983): 439–443.
- Farr, C. 'Liturgical Influences On The Decoration Of The Book Of Kells'. In Catherine Karkov and Robert T Farrell (eds). Studies in Insular Art and Archaeology. Oxford, Ohio: American Early Medieval Studies and the Miami University School of Fine Arts, 1991. ISBN 1-879836-00-9
- Morin, Germanus (ed.). Anecdota Maredsolana. Volume 1. Liber Comicus. Maredsous Abbey, 1893.
