= Codex Gatianum =

8th-century Latin manuscript of the New Testament

The Codex Gatianum, designated by gat or 30 (in Beuron system), is an 8th-century Latin manuscript of the New Testament. The text, written on vellum, is a version of the Old Latin.

== Description ==
The manuscript contains the text of the four Gospels. The Latin text of the Gospels is a representative of the Old Latin version.

== History ==
Sabatier dated the manuscript to the 7th century, Kilkpatrick to the 8th century. The text was published by Paul Sabatier and J. M. Heer in 1910. It was examined by Heer and Love.

Currently it is housed at the National Library of France (fond lat. 1587) in Paris.

== See also ==
- List of New Testament Latin manuscripts
- Codex Sangermanensis I
