= Frisingensia Fragmenta =

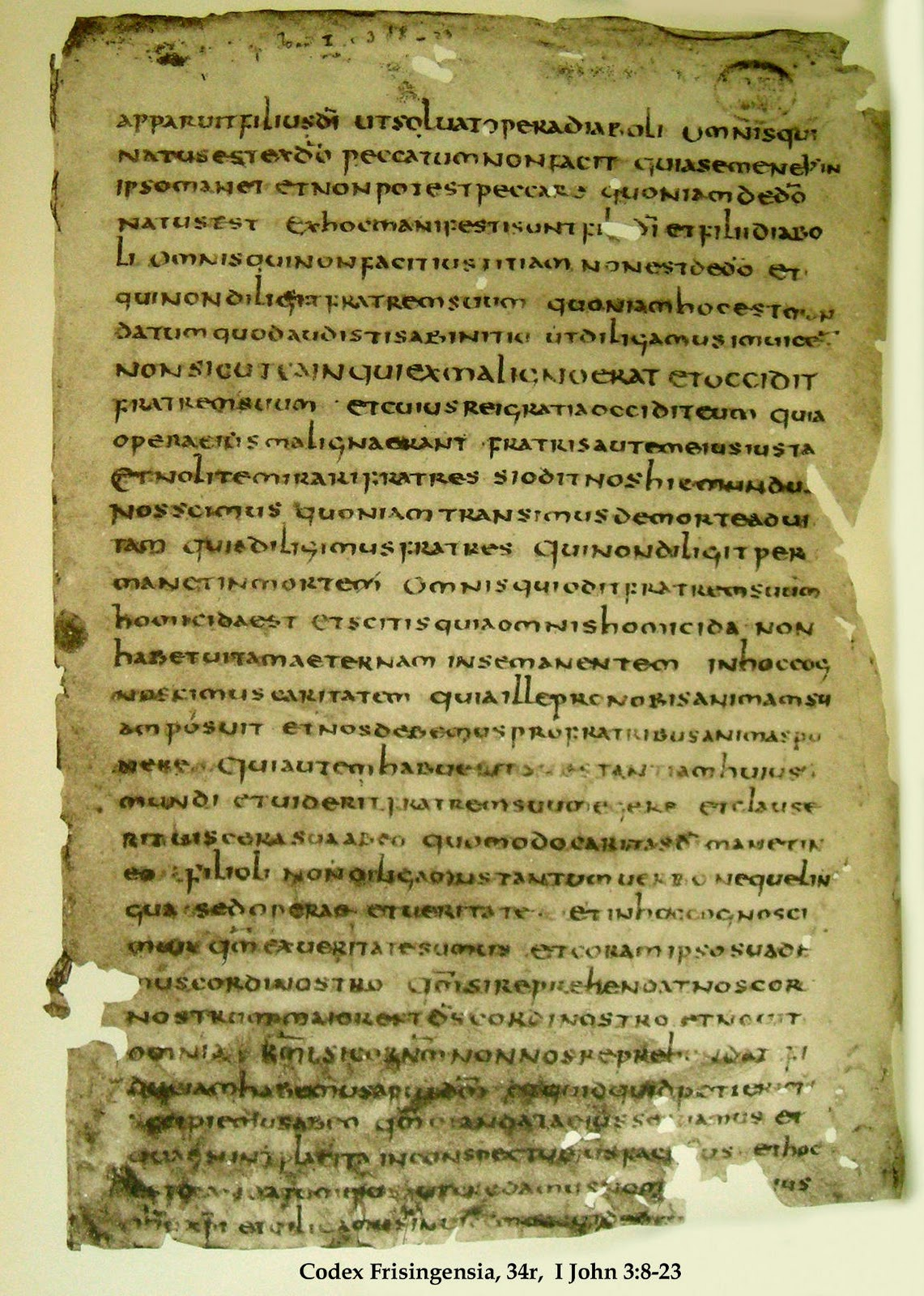
Folio 34 recto

The Codex Frisingensis, designated by r and q or 64 (in Beuron system), is a 6th or 7th century Latin manuscript of the New Testament. The text, written on vellum, is a version of the old Latin. The manuscript contains the text of the Pauline epistles with numerous lacunae on only 26 parchment leaves.

The manuscript is variously dated. Vogels and Wordsworth dated it to the 5th or 6th century, Merk to the 7th century, Bover and Kilpatrick to the 7th or 8th century.

Contents

Rom 14:10-15:13; 1 Cor 1:1-27; 1:28-3:5; 6:1-7:7; 15:1-1:43; 16:12-27; 2 Cor 1:1-2:10; 3:17-5:1; 7:10-8:12; 9:10-11:21; 12:14-13:10; Gal 2:5-4:3; 6:5-17; Eph 1:1-13; 1:16-2:16; 6:24; Phil 1:1-20; 1 Tim 1:12-2:15; 5:18-6:13; Hbr 6:6-7:5; 7:8-8:1; 9:27-11:7.

1 John 3:8 - 5:9.

== Text ==
The Latin text of the codex is a representative of the Western text-type in the itala recension.

In 1 Corinthians 2:4 it supports reading πειθοις σοφιας λογοις (plausible words of wisdom) – (א λογος) B (D^{gr} 33 πιθοις) D^{c} 181 1739 1877 1881 vg^{ww} eth.

It contains the Comma Johanneum.

== History ==
Eight leaves were examined by Tischendorf in 1856. It was examined by Henry J. White, Wordsworth, Donatien de Bruyne, Leo Ziegler, and A. Jülicher.

Currently it is housed at the Bayerische Staatsbibliothek (Clm 6436) in Munich.

== See also ==
- List of New Testament Latin manuscripts
