= Vetus Latina =

Bible translations into Latin before Jerome's Vulgate

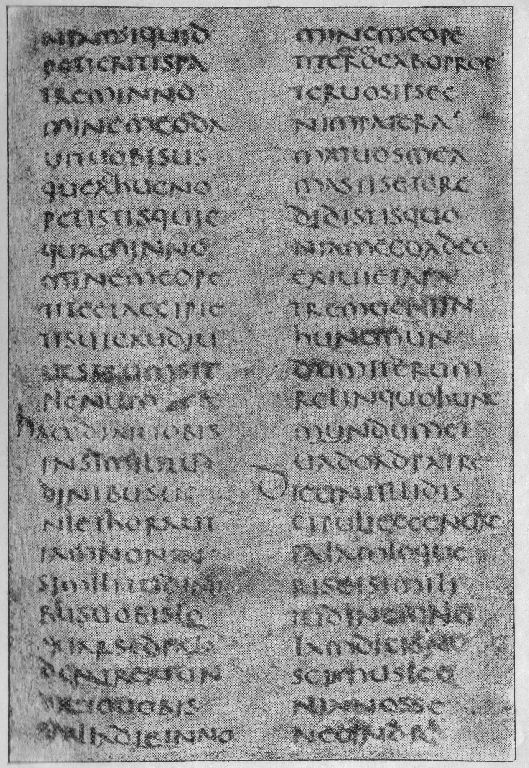
Verses from the Vetus Latina Gospel of John (16:23–30) as they appear on a page of the Codex Vercellensis

The Vetus Latina ("Old Latin" in Latin), denoted by the siglum $\mathfrak{{L}}$, are the Latin translations of biblical texts (both Old Testament and New Testament) that preceded the Vulgate (the Latin translation produced by Jerome in the late 4th century).

The Vetus Latina translations continued to be used alongside the Vulgate, but eventually the Vulgate became the standard Latin Bible used by the Catholic Church, especially after the Council of Trent (1545–1563) affirmed the Vulgate translation as authoritative for the text of Catholic Bibles. However, the Vetus Latina texts survive in some parts of the liturgy (e.g., the Pater Noster).

As the English translation of Vetus Latina is "Old Latin", the pre-Vulgate translations are also sometimes referred to as the Old Latin Bible, although they are written in the form of Latin known as Late Latin, not that known as Old Latin. The Vetus Latina manuscripts that are preserved today are dated from AD 350 to the 13th century.

The term Itala ("Italian"), also Vetus Itala ("Old Italian") or Old Italic, may be used synonymously with Vetus Latina, but Augustine of Hippo introduced the term Itala for a particular Latin text stream. Modern scholarship often distinguishes the Itala from the Afra or Vetus Afra ("[Old] African") text forms.

== Text ==
There is no single "Vetus Latina Bible". Instead, Vetus Latina is a collection of biblical manuscript texts that are Latin translations of Septuagint and New Testament passages that preceded Jerome's Vulgate. Scholars have identified four main text-types: Old African (from c.250), Recent African, Early European, and Italian.

=== Old Testament ===
Some of the oldest surviving Vetus Latina versions of the Old Testament include the Quedlinburg Itala fragment, a 5th-century manuscript containing parts of 1 Samuel, and the Codex Complutensis I, a 10th-century manuscript containing Vetus Latina readings of the Book of Ruth, Book of Esther, Book of Tobit, Book of Judith, and 1-2 Maccabees.

=== New Testament ===
There are over 80 manuscripts or fragments with Latin translations of New Testament books that pre-date Jerome (i.e. before AD 350). There are around 50 for the Gospels in particular. The vetus latina were revised to form the Vulgate New Testament: Jerome producing the Gospels and an unknown scholar producing the rest.

After comparing readings for Luke 24:4–5 in Vetus Latina manuscripts, Bruce Metzger counted "at least 27 variant readings in Vetus Latina manuscripts that have survived" for this passage alone.

== Replacement ==
When Jerome undertook the revision of Latin translations of Old Testament texts in the late 4th century, he checked the Septuagint and Vetus Latina translations against the Hebrew texts that were then available. He broke with church tradition and translated most of the Old Testament of his Vulgate from Hebrew sources rather than from the Greek Septuagint. His choice was severely criticized by Augustine, his contemporary; a flood of still less moderate criticism came from those who regarded Jerome as a forger. While on the one hand he argued for the superiority of the Hebrew texts in correcting the Septuagint on both philological and theological grounds, on the other, in the context of accusations of heresy against him, Jerome would acknowledge the Septuagint texts as well.

== Comparisons with the Vulgate ==
Below are some comparisons of the Vetus Latina with text from critical editions of the Vulgate.

The following comparison is of Luke 6:1–4, taken from the Vetus Latina text in the Codex Bezae:

Vetus Latina	Latin Vulgate	Douay Rheims
Et factum est eum in Sabbato secundoprimo abire per segetes discipuli autem illius coeperunt vellere spicas et fricantes manibus manducabant.	factum est autem in sabbato secundoprimo cum transiret per sata vellebant discipuli eius spicas et manducabant confricantes manibus	And it came to pass on the second first sabbath, that as he went through the corn fields, his disciples plucked the ears, and did eat, rubbing them in their hands.
Quidam autem de farisaeis dicebant ei, Ecce quid faciunt discipuli tui sabbatis quod non licet?	quidam autem Pharisaeorum dicebant illis quid facitis quod non licet in sabbatis	And some of the Pharisees said to them: Why do you that which is not lawful on the sabbath days?
Respondens autem IHS dixit ad eos, Numquam hoc legistis quod fecit David quando esuriit ipse et qui cum eo erat?	et respondens Iesus ad eos dixit nec hoc legistis quod fecit David cum esurisset ipse et qui cum eo erant	And Jesus answering them, said: Have you not read so much as this, what David did, when himself was hungry, and they that were with him:
Intro ibit in domum Dei et panes propositionis manducavit et dedit et qui cum erant quibus non licebat manducare si non solis sacerdotibus?	quomodo intravit in domum Dei et panes propositionis sumpsit et manducavit et dedit his qui cum ipso erant quos non licet manducare nisi tantum sacerdotibus	How he went into the house of God, and took and ate the bread of proposition, and gave to them that were with him, which is not lawful to eat but only for the priests?

The Vetus Latina text survives in places in the Catholic liturgy, such as the following verse well known from Christmas carols, Luke 2:14:

Vetus Latina	Latin Vulgate	King James Version (1611)	Douay Rheims
Gloria in excelsis Deo, et super terra pax in hominibus consolationis	gloria in altissimis Deo et in terra pax in hominibus bonae voluntatis	Glory to God in the highest, and on earth peace, good will toward men.	Glory to God in the highest; and on earth peace to men of good will.

The Vetus Latina text means, "Glory [belongs] to God among the high, and peace [belongs] to men of good will on earth". The Vulgate text means "Glory [belongs] to God among the most high and peace among men of good will on earth".

Probably the most well known difference between the Vetus Latina and the Vulgate is in the Pater Noster, where the phrase from the Vetus Latina, Panem nostrum cotidianum, "our daily bread", becomes Panem nostrum supersubstantialem, "our supersubstantial bread" in the Vulgate; the Vetus Latina form being retained in the Roman Missal for liturgical use.

== See also ==
- Latin Psalters
- List of New Testament Latin manuscripts
- Vetus Latina manuscripts

== Bibliography ==
- Brooke, Alan England; McLean, Norman; Thackeray, Henry St. John (1906). The Old Testament in Greek. Volume I: The Octateuch. Part I: Genesis. Cambridge: Cambridge University Press. p. 176.
- Brooke, Alan England; McLean, Norman; Thackeray, Henry St. John (1927). The Old Testament in Greek. Volume II: The Later Historical Books. Part I: I and II Samuel. Cambridge: Cambridge University Press. p. 220.
- Brooke, Alan England; McLean, Norman; Thackeray, Henry St. John (1930). The Old Testament in Greek. Volume II: The Later Historical Books. Part II: I and II Kings (PDF). Cambridge: Cambridge University Press. p. 208.
- Everson, David L. (2014). "The Vetus Latina and the Vulgate of the Book of Exodus". The Book of Exodus: Composition, Reception, and Interpretation. Leiden: Brill. pp. 370–386. ISBN 978-90-04-28266-7.
- Fischer, Bonifatius (1951). Vetus Latina: die Reste der altlateinischen Bibel. Genesis, Volumes 2–4. Freiburg: Herder. p. 576.
