= List of New Testament minuscules (601–700) =

A New Testament minuscule is a copy of a portion of the New Testament written in a small, cursive Greek script (developed from Uncial).

== Legend ==
- The numbers (#) are the now standard system of Caspar René Gregory, often referred to as the Gregory-Aland numbers.
- Included among the cataloged minuscules are the following types of manuscripts, color coded:

Grey represents continuous text manuscripts containing only New Testament portions
Beige represents manuscripts with New Testament portions and a catena (quotations from church fathers)
Light cyan represents manuscripts of single-author commentaries who included the full Scripture text.
Light red represents manuscripts of single-author commentaries who included both the full Scripture text and a catena.
Light purple represents manuscripts of commentaries where the Scripture text was abridged.
White represents manuscript numbers no longer in use.

- Dates are estimated to the nearest 100 year increment where specific date is unknown.
- Content generally only describes sections of the New Testament: Gospels, The Acts of the Apostles (Acts), Pauline epistles, and so on. Sometimes the surviving portion of a codex is so limited that specific books, chapters or even verses can be indicated. Linked articles, where they exist, generally specify content in detail, by verse.
- Digital images are referenced with direct links to the hosting web pages, with the exception of those at the INTF. The quality and accessibility of the images is as follows:

Gold color indicates high resolution color images available online.
Tan color indicates high resolution color images available locally, not online.
Light tan color indicates only a small fraction of manuscript pages with color images available online.
Light gray color indicates black/white or microfilm images available online.
Light blue color indicates manuscript not imaged, and is currently lost or ownership unknown.
Light pink color indicates manuscript destroyed, presumed destroyed, or deemed too fragile to digitize.
Violet color indicates high resolution ultraviolet images available online.

† Indicates the manuscript has damaged or missing pages.
^{P} Indicates only a portion of the books were included.
^{K} Indicates manuscript also includes a commentary.
^{S} Indicates lost portions of manuscript replaced via supplement of a later hand.
^{abs} (abschrift) Indicates manuscript is copy.
[ ] Brackets around Gregory-Aland number indicate the manuscript belongs to an already numbered manuscript, was found to not be a continuous text manuscript, was found to be written in modern Greek versus Koine Greek, was proved a forgery, or has been destroyed.

== Minuscules 601-700 ==
#	Date	Contents	Pages	Institution and refs.	City, State	Country	Images
601	13th	Acts, Pauline Epistles†, General Epistles	257	National Library, Grec 104	Paris	France	BnF, INTF, CSNTM
602	10th	Acts†, General Epistles†, Pauline Epistles†	248	National Library, Grec 105	Paris	France	BnF, INTF, CSNTM
603	14th	Acts, Pauline Epistles, General Epistles	276	National Library, Grec 106 A	Paris	France	BnF, INTF
604	14th	Acts, Pauline Epistles, General Epistles	394	National Library, Grec 125	Paris	France	BnF, INTF, CSNTM
605	10th	Acts, Pauline Epistles, General Epistles	333	National Library, Grec 216	Paris	France	BnF
605	10th	Acts, Pauline Epistles, General Epistles	333	National Library, Grec 216	Paris	France	INTF
606	11th	Theodoret Commentary on Acts, Pauline Epistles, General Epistles	373	National Library, Grec 217	Paris	France	BnF, INTF, CSNTM
607	11th	Acts, Pauline Epistles, General Epistles (no commentary)	317	National Library, Grec 218	Paris	France	BnF, INTF
608	14th	Theophylact Commentary on Acts, Pauline Epistles, General Epistles	388	National Library, Grec 220	Paris	France	BnF, INTF
609 + [2152]	1043	Gospel of Luke†	315	National Library, Supplement Grec 911	Paris	France	BnF, INTF
609 + [2152]	1043	Gospel of Luke†	2	National Library of Russia, Gr. 290, (Luke 8:8-14)	Saint Petersburg	Russia	INTF
610	12th	Acts†, General Epistles†	177	National Library, Grec 221	Paris	France	BnF, INTF, CSNTM
611	12th	Acts†, Pauline Epistles†, General Epistles	295	Formerly, Turin National University Library, C. VI. 19 (destroyed)	Turin	Italy	
612	12th	Acts†, Pauline Epistles, General Epistles	370	Turin National University Library, B. V. 19, B.VI.43	Turin	Italy	INTF
613	12th	Acts, Pauline Epistles, General Epistles	174	Turin National University Library, C. V. 1	Turin	Italy	INTF
614	13th	Acts, Pauline Epistles, General Epistles	276	Ambrosiana Library, E 97 sup.	Milan	Italy	INTF
615	15th	Pauline Epistles, General Epistles	202	Ambrosiana Library, E 102 sup.	Milan	Italy	INTF
616	1434	Acts, Pauline Epistles, General Epistles, Revelation	164	Ambrosiana Library, H 104 sup.	Milan	Italy	INTF
617	11th	Acts†, Pauline Epistles†, General Epistles, Revelation	268	Marciana National Library, Gr. Z. 546 (786)	Venice	Italy	INTF
618	12th	Acts†, Pauline Epistles†, General Epistles†	292	Estense Library, G. 243, a.F.1.28. (III B 17)	Modena	Italy	INTF
619	984	Pauline Epistles	264	Laurentian Library, Conv. Soppr. 191, (f. 72-341)	Florence	Italy	BML, CSNTM, INTF
620	12th	Pauline Epistles†, General Epistles, Revelation	150	Laurentian Library, Conv. Soppr. 150	Florence	Italy	BML, CSNTM, INTF
621	11th	Acts, Romans - 1 Corinthians, General Epistles	164	Vatican Library, Vat.gr.1270	Vatican City	Vatican City	DVL, INTF
622	12th	Commentary on Pauline Epistles†, General Epistles†	270	Vatican Library, Vat.gr.1430	Vatican City	Vatican City	INTF
623	1037	Chrysostom Commentary on Acts†, Pauline Epistles, General Epistles	187	Vatican Library, Vat.gr.1650	Vatican City	Vatican City	INTF
624	11th	Acts†, Romans† - 1 Corinthians†, General Epistles†	46	Vatican Library, Vat.gr.1714	Vatican City	Vatican City	INTF
625	12th/13th	Acts, Pauline Epistles, General Epistles	481	Vatican Library, Vat.gr.1761	Vatican City	Vatican City	INTF
626	10th	Acts†, James, 1 Peter	84	Vatican Library, Vat.gr.1968	Vatican City	Vatican City	INTF
627	10th	Acts†, Pauline Epistles†, General Epistles, Revelation	187	Vatican Library, Vat.gr.2062	Vatican City	Vatican City	DVL, INTF
628	14th	Acts†, Pauline Epistles, General Epistles, Revelation†	216	Vatican Library, Ott.gr.258	Vatican City	Vatican City	INTF
629	14th	Acts, Pauline Epistles, General Epistles	265	Vatican Library, Ott.gr.298	Vatican City	Vatican City	DVL
629	14th	Acts, Pauline Epistles, General Epistles	265	Vatican Library, Ott.gr.298	Vatican City	Vatican City	INTF, CSNTM
630	12th/13th	Acts, Pauline Epistles, General Epistles	215	Vatican Library, Ott.gr.325	Vatican City	Vatican City	DVL
630	12th/13th	Acts, Pauline Epistles, General Epistles	215	Vatican Library, Ott.gr.325	Vatican City	Vatican City	INTF
631	15th	General Epistles†	24	Vatican Library, Ott.gr.417, fol. 49-72	Vatican City	Vatican City	INTF
632	12th/14th	Acts, Pauline Epistles, General Epistles, Revelation	258	Vallicelliana Library, ms.B. 86	Rome	Italy	BV
632	12th/14th	Acts, Pauline Epistles, General Epistles, Revelation	258	Vallicelliana Library, ms.B. 86	Rome	Italy	INTF
633	14th	Acts†, Pauline Epistles, General Epistles	204	Vallicelliana Library, ms.F. 13	Rome	Italy	BV
633	14th	Acts†, Pauline Epistles, General Epistles	204	Vallicelliana Library, ms.F. 13	Rome	Italy	INTF
634	1394	Acts, Pauline Epistles, General Epistles	248	Vatican Library, Chig.R.V.29	Vatican City	Vatican City	DVL
634	1394	Acts, Pauline Epistles, General Epistles	248	Vatican Library, Chig.R.V.29	Vatican City	Vatican City	INTF
635	11th	Acts, Pauline Epistles, General Epistles	243	Victor Emmanuel III National Library, Ms. II. A. 8	Naples	Italy	INTF
636	15th	Acts, Pauline Epistles, General Epistles	211	Victor Emmanuel III National Library, Ms. II. A. 9	Naples	Italy	INTF
637	12th	Acts, Pauline Epistles, General Epistles	242	University Library, 104	Messina	Italy	INTF
638	11th	Acts, Pauline Epistles, General Epistles	306	Christ Church, Wake 38	Oxford	United Kingdom	INTF
639	11th	Acts†, Pauline Epistles, General Epistles†	237	Christ Church, Wake 37, f. 237	Oxford	United Kingdom	INTF
640	11th	Epistle of James 1:1-23	2	British Library, Add MS 19392a	London	United Kingdom	BL
640	11th	Epistle of James 1:1-23	2	British Library, Add MS 19392a	London	United Kingdom	INTF
641	11th	Acts†, Pauline Epistles†, General Epistles	248	British Library, Add MS 22734	London	United Kingdom	BL
641	11th	Acts†, Pauline Epistles†, General Epistles	248	British Library, Add MS 22734	London	United Kingdom	INTF
642	14th	Acts†, Pauline Epistles†, General Epistles	209	Lambeth Palace, MS1185	London	United Kingdom	CSNTM
643	12th/13th	James - 3 John	15	British Library, Burney MS 48, Bd. II, fol. 230-244	London	United Kingdom	BL
643	12th/13th	James - 3 John	15	British Library, Burney MS 48, Bd. II, fol. 230-244	London	United Kingdom	INTF
644	14th	2 Corinthians - Hebrews, James - 1 Peter	94	British Library, Add MS 19388	London	United Kingdom	BL
644	14th	2 Corinthians - Hebrews, James - 1 Peter	94	British Library, Add MS 19388	London	United Kingdom	INTF
645	1304-5	Gospels	279	British Library, Add MS 22506	London	United Kingdom	BL
646	16th	Gospels	214	National Library, Taphos 218	Athens	Greece	INTF
647=[2371]	11th	Gospels	297	Walters Art Museum, Ms. W. 529	Baltimore, MD	United States	WAM
648	14th	Gospels†	227	National Library, Taphos 282	Athens	Greece	INTF
649	1305	Theophylact Commentary on the Gospels†	296	Turkish Historical Society, 1	Ankara	Turkey	INTF
650	12th	Gospels†	217	Turkish Historical Society, 5	Ankara	Turkey	INTF
651	11th	Gospels	190	Anhaltinian Regional Library	Dessau	Germany	INTF
652	10th	Gospels	305	Bavarian State Library, Cod.graec. 594	Munich	Germany	BSB, INTF
653	1077	Matthew, John	266	Jagiellonian Library, Graec. Oct. 3	Kraków	Poland	INTF
653	1077	Matthew, John	1	National Library of Russia, Gr. 292	Saint Petersburg	Russia	INTF
654	12th	Gospels†	179	Jagiellonian Library, Graec. Oct. 4	Kraków	Poland	
655	11th/12th	Gospels	324	Berlin State Library, Graec. qu. 39	Berlin	Germany	INTF
656	12th	Luke† 14:51-53, John, Acts, Romans - 1 Thessalonians, General Epistles	140	Berlin State Library, Graec. oct. 9	Berlin	Germany	INTF
657 = [838]	11th/12th	Gospels†	296	Berlin State Library, Graec. oct. 12	Berlin	Germany	INTF
658	12th/13th	Gospels	220	Jagiellonian Library, Hss. Graec. qu. 47	Kraków	Poland	
659	12th	Gospels	293	Jagiellonian Library, Hss. Graec. qu. 55?	Kraków	Poland	
660	12th	Gospels†	341	Berlin State Library, Hss. Graec. qu. 66	Berlin	Germany	INTF
661	11th	Gospels	234	Jagiellonian Library, Hss. Graec. qu. 67	Kraków	Poland	
662	12th	Gospels	254	National Gallery of Victoria, Ms. 710/5	Melbourne	Australia	CSNTM
662	12th	Gospels	254	National Gallery of Victoria, Ms. 710/5	Melbourne	Australia	INTF
663	13th	Gospels	277	National and University Library, Ms. 1907	Strasbourg	France	BnF
663	13th	Gospels	277	National and University Library, Ms. 1907	Strasbourg	France	INTF
664	15th	New Testament	233	Christian Weise Library, A 1	Zittau	Germany	INTF
665	13th	Acts, Pauline Epistles^{S}†, General Epistles†	149	Bodleian Library, Auct. F. 6. 24	Oxford	United Kingdom	INTF
666	13th	Gospels†	298	Harvard University Library, Ms. Gr. 1	Cambridge, MA	United States	INTF
667	11th/12th	Gospels	178	Owner Unknown (formerly, Drew University)			
668	13th/14th	Gospels	201	Syracuse University, Ms. 226.048G	Syracuse, NY	United States	INTF
669	10th	Gospels†	272	Dumbarton Oaks, Ms. 6, (Acc. No. BZ.2017.001)	Washington, DC	United States	CSNTM
669	10th	Gospels†	272	Dumbarton Oaks, Ms. 6, (Acc. No. BZ.2017.001)	Washington, DC	United States	INTF
670	11th/12th	Gospel of Luke 8:3-24, 9:13-34	2	Owner unknown			
671	12th	Gospels†	104	Owner unknown			
672	11th	Gospels†	278	Cambridge University Library, Add. Mss. 720	Cambridge	United Kingdom	INTF, CSNTM
673	12th	Matthew†, Mark†, Luke†	164	Cambridge University Library, Add. Mss. 1837	Cambridge	United Kingdom	INTF
674	12th	Matthew 10:42-12:43†	4	Cambridge University Library, Add. Mss. 1879.11	Cambridge	United Kingdom	CSNTM, INTF
675	13th	Matthew 26:20-39	2	Cambridge University Library, Add. Mss. 1879.24	Cambridge	United Kingdom	CSNTM, INTF
676	13th	Gospels†, Acts, Pauline Epistles, General Epistles	344	INTF, Ms. 2	Münster	Germany	CSNTM, INTF
677	13th	Gospels†	222	University of Chicago Library, Goodspeed Gr. 232	Chicago	United States	TUOCL
677	13th	Gospels†	222	University of Chicago Library, Goodspeed Gr. 232	Chicago	United States	INTF
678	12th	Gospels	395	Dumbarton Oaks, Ms. 5	Washington, DC	United States	HL, INTF
679	13th	Gospels	240	J. Paul Getty Museum, Ludw. II 5 (Phillipps 3887)	Malibu, CA	United States	JPGM
679	13th	Gospels	240	J. Paul Getty Museum, Ludw. II 5 (Phillipps 3887)	Malibu, CA	United States	INTF
680	14th	New Testament	190	Yale University Library, Beinecke MS 248	New Haven, CT	United States	YUL
680	14th	New Testament	190	Yale University Library, Beinecke MS 248	New Haven, CT	United States	INTF
680	14th	New Testament	190	Yale University Library, Beinecke MS 248	New Haven, CT	United States	CSNTM
681	13th	Gospels	251	Owner unknown			
682	11th	Gospels	309	The Van Kampen Foundation, VK 905	(Unknown)	United States	CSNTM, INTF
683	13th	Gospels	206	Bodleian Library, MS. Holkham Gr. 4	Oxford	United Kingdom	INTF
684	1228	Theophylact Commentary on the Gospels	300	Bodleian Library, MS. Holkham Gr. 64	Oxford	United Kingdom	INTF
685	13th	Gospels	229	University of Michigan, Mississippi 151	Ann Arbor	United States	CSNTM, INTF
686	1337	Gospels	226	British Library, Add MS 5468	London	United Kingdom	BL
687	11th	Matthew 10:33-18:16†	7	British Library, Add MS 11868B	London	United Kingdom	BL
687	11th	Matthew 10:33-18:16†	7	British Library, Add MS 11868B	London	United Kingdom	INTF
688	1179	Gospels	226	British Library, Add MS 22736	London	United Kingdom	BL
688	1179	Gospels	226	British Library, Add MS 22736	London	United Kingdom	INTF
689	13th	Gospels	313	British Library, Add MS 22737	London	United Kingdom	BL
689	13th	Gospels	313	British Library, Add MS 22737	London	United Kingdom	INTF
690	14th	Gospels	237	British Library, Add MS 22738	London	United Kingdom	BL
690	14th	Gospels	237	British Library, Add MS 22738	London	United Kingdom	INTF
691	14th	Gospels	275	British Library, Add MS 22739	London	United Kingdom	BL
692	14th	Matthew, Mark, Luke	237	British Library, Add MS 22740	London	United Kingdom	BL
692	14th	Matthew, Mark, Luke	237	British Library, Add MS 22740	London	United Kingdom	INTF
693	14th	Gospel†	208	British Library, Add MS 22741	London	United Kingdom	BL
693	14th	Gospel†	208	British Library, Add MS 22741	London	United Kingdom	INTF
694	15th	Gospels	211	British Library, Add MS 24112	London	United Kingdom	BL
695	13th	Gospels†	299	British Library, Add MS 24373	London	United Kingdom	BL
695	13th	Gospels†	299	British Library, Add MS 24373	London	United Kingdom	INTF
696	13th	Gospels	350	British Library, Add MS 24376	London	United Kingdom	BL
697	13th	Gospels	242	British Library, Add MS 26103	London	United Kingdom	BL
697	13th	Gospels	242	British Library, Add MS 26103	London	United Kingdom	INTF
698	14th	Mark, Luke, John	186	British Library, Add MS 27861	London	United Kingdom	BL
699	11th	Gospels, Acts, General Epistles, Romans 1:1-16:19†, 1 Corinthians† 1:11-end, 2 Corinthians 1:1-10:9†, Galatians† 1:12-end	302	British Library, Add MS 28815	London	United Kingdom	BL
699	11th	Gospels, Acts, General Epistles, Romans 1:1-16:19†, 1 Corinthians† 1:11-end, 2 Corinthians 1:1-10:9†, Galatians† 1:12-end	302	British Library, Add MS 28815	London	United Kingdom	INTF
699	11th	Ephesians-Hebrews, Revelation	67	British Library, Egerton MS 3145	London	United Kingdom	BL
699	11th	Ephesians-Hebrews, Revelation	67	British Library, Egerton MS 3145	London	United Kingdom	INTF
700	11th	Gospels	297	British Library, Egerton MS 2610	London	United Kingdom	BL
700	11th	Gospels	297	British Library, Egerton MS 2610	London	United Kingdom	INTF, CSNTM

[top]

== See also ==
- List of New Testament papyri
- List of New Testament uncials
- List of New Testament minuscules (1–1000)
- List of New Testament minuscules (1001–2000)
- List of New Testament minuscules (2001–)
- List of New Testament minuscules ordered by Location/Institution
- List of New Testament lectionaries

== Bibliography ==
- Aland, Kurt; M. Welte; B. Köster; K. Junack (1994). Kurzgefasste Liste der griechischen Handschriften des Neues Testaments. Berlin, New York: Walter de Gruyter. p. 95. ISBN 3-11-011986-2.
- "Liste Handschriften". Münster: Institute for New Testament Textual Research.
