= Minuscule 637 =

- New Testament manuscript
- Text: Acts, Catholic epistles, Paul
- Date: 12th century
- Script: Greek
- Now at: University of Messina
- Size: 29.5 cm by 22.5 cm
- Type: Byzantine text-type
- Category: V

Minuscule 637 (in the Gregory-Aland numbering), α 262 (von Soden), is a Greek minuscule manuscript of the New Testament, on parchment. Palaeographically to the 12th century. The manuscript is lacunose. Formerly it was labeled by 175^{a} and 216^{p}.

== Description ==
The codex contains the text of the Acts of the Apostles, Catholic epistles, Pauline epistles, on 242 parchment leaves (size 29.5 cm by 22.5 cm). It is written in two columns per page, 25 lines per page. It contains Prolegomena, tables of the κεφαλαια, list of μαρτυριαι, μαρτυριαι, lectionary markings, Menologion, subscriptions, and numbers of στιχοι at the margin.

The order of books: Acts of the Apostles, Catholic epistles, and Pauline epistles. Epistle to the Hebrews is placed after Epistle to Philemon.

== Text ==
The Greek text of the codex is a representative of the Byzantine text-type. Kurt Aland placed it in Category V.

== History ==
The manuscript has been dated by INTF to the 12th century. It was written in Calabria.

The manuscript was added to the list of New Testament manuscripts by Johann Martin Augustin Scholz. It was examined by Andrew Birch. Gregory saw the manuscript in 1886.

Formerly it was labeled by 175^{a} and 216^{p}. In 1908 Gregory gave the number 637 to it.

The manuscript currently is housed at the library of University of Messina (104), at Messina.

== See also ==
- List of New Testament minuscules
- Biblical manuscript
- Textual criticism
- Minuscule 636
- Minuscule 638
