= 625 (disambiguation) =

625 may refer to:

- 625 (number)
- AD 625, a year
- 625 BC, a year

== Arts, entertainment, and media ==
- 625 Thrashcore, an American record label
- Minuscule 625, a Greek manuscript of the New Testament
- Theatre 625, a British television drama anthology series

== Astronomy ==
- 625 Xenia, a minor planet orbiting the Sun
- Gliese 625, a red dwarf star located in the constellation Draco
- NGC 625, a dwarf barred spiral galaxy in the constellation Phoenix

== Military ==
- No. 625 Squadron RAF, a heavy bomber squadron of the Royal Air Force during World War II
- No. 625 Volunteer Gliding Squadron RAF, a flying training unit of Royal Air Force

== Transportation ==
- List of highways numbered 625

=== Aircraft ===
- American Airlines Flight 625, a Boeing 727-100 that crashed at St. Thomas, U.S. Virgin Islands on April 27, 1976

=== Automobiles ===
- Ferrari Tipo 625, a four-cylinder engine, used in the following cars:
  - Ferrari 625 F1, a 1954 Italian F1 racing car
  - Ferrari 625 LM, a 1956 Italian sports racer
  - Ferrari 625 TF, a 1953 Italian sports racer

=== Rail ===
- FS Class 625, a class of 2-6-0 'mogul' steam locomotives in Italy

=== Watercraft ===
- Beituo 625-class tug, a class of naval auxiliary ship of the People's Liberation Army Navy
- German submarine U-625, a Type VIIC U-boat of Nazi Germany's Kriegsmarine during World War II
- Type 625 research vessel, a series of oceanographic research ship of the People's Liberation Army Navy
- USS Harding (DD-625), a Gleaves-class destroyer of the United States Navy

== Other uses ==
- 625 Park Avenue, a co-op residential building in New York City, New York, United States
- Experiment 625, the codename for Reuben, a fictional alien character from Disney's Lilo & Stitch franchise
- Nokia Lumia 625, a Windows Phone
- Smith & Wesson Model 625, a six-round, double-action revolver
- 625 points is the highest possible Irish Leaving Certificate score
