= Minuscule 604 =

Greek manuscript, New Testament

- New Testament manuscript
- Text: Acts of the Apostles, Pauline epistles
- Date: 14th century
- Script: Greek
- Now at: Bibliothèque nationale de France
- Size: 16.9 cm by 12.5 cm
- Type: Byzantine text-type
- Category: V

Minuscule 604 (in the Gregory-Aland numbering), α 459 (von Soden), is a Greek minuscule manuscript of the New Testament, on parchment. Palaeographically it has been assigned to the 14th century. Formerly it was labeled by 125^{a} and 150^{p}.

== Description ==
The codex contains the text of the Acts of the Apostles, Catholic epistles, Pauline epistles on 394 parchment leaves (size 16.9 cm by 12.5 cm). The text is written in one column per page, 16 lines per page.

It contains Prolegomena at the beginning, lectionary markings at the margin, αναγνωσεις, subscriptions at the end of each book, with numbers of στιχοι.

The order of books: Acts, Catholic, and Pauline epistles. Epistle to the Hebrews is placed after Epistle to Philemon.

== Text ==
The Greek text of the codex is a representative of the Byzantine text-type. Aland placed it in Category V.

== History ==
The manuscript was brought from Constantinople to Paris.

The manuscript was added to the list of New Testament manuscripts by Johann Martin Augustin Scholz. It was examined and described by Paulin Martin. Gregory saw the manuscript in 1885.

The manuscript currently is housed at the Bibliothèque nationale de France (Gr. 125), at Paris.

== See also ==
- List of New Testament minuscules
- Biblical manuscript
- Textual criticism
