= Minuscule 607 =

- New Testament manuscript
- Text: Acts of the Apostles, Pauline epistles
- Date: 11th century
- Script: Greek
- Now at: Bibliothèque nationale de France
- Size: 32 cm by 24.8 cm
- Type: Byzantine text-type
- Category: V

Minuscule 607 (in the Gregory-Aland numbering), O ^{19} (von Soden), is a Greek minuscule manuscript of the New Testament, on parchment. Palaeographically it has been assigned to the 11th century. The manuscript has complex contents. Formerly it was labeled by 128^{a} and 155^{p}.

== Description ==
The codex contains the text of the Acts of the Apostles, Catholic epistles, Pauline epistles on 317 parchment leaves (size 32 cm by 24.8 cm). The text is written in one column per page, 37 lines per page. The text of the Catholic epistles is surrounded by a catena.

The order of books: Acts, Catholic, and Pauline epistles. Epistle to the Hebrews is placed after Epistle to Philemon.

== Text ==
The Greek text of the codex is a representative of the Byzantine text-type. Aland placed it in Category V.

== History ==
The manuscript was added to the list of New Testament manuscripts by Johann Martin Augustin Scholz. It was examined and described by Paulin Martin. Gregory saw the manuscript in 1885.

Formerly it was labeled by 128^{a} and 155^{p}. In 1908 Gregory gave the number 607 to it.

The manuscript currently is housed at the Bibliothèque nationale de France (Gr. 218), at Paris.

== See also ==
- List of New Testament minuscules
- Biblical manuscript
- Textual criticism
