= Lectionary 302 =

Lectionary ℓ 302
- New Testament manuscript
- Text: Evangelistarion
- Date: 15th century
- Script: Greek
- Now at: Duke University
- Size: 31 cm by 21.7 cm

Lectionary 302 designated by siglum ℓ 302 (in the Gregory-Aland numbering). It is a Greek minuscule manuscript of the New Testament, written on paper. Palaeographically it has been assigned to the 15th century.

== Description ==
The codex contains weekday lessons from the Gospels lectionary (Evangelistarium), on 199 paper leaves (31 by 21.7 cm), with some lacunae. The text is written in two columns per page, in 28 lines per page. The manuscript contains weekday Gospel lessons.

== History ==
The manuscript was brought to America in 1844 from Canea in Crete, by George Benton (along with Minuscule 670, and Minuscule 669). It was examined by J. Rendel Harris.

The manuscript was added to the list of New Testament manuscripts by Caspar René Gregory (number 302^{e}).

The codex now is located in the Kenneth Willis Clark Collection of the Duke University (Gk MS 83) at Durham.

== See also ==
- List of New Testament lectionaries
- Biblical manuscripts
- Textual criticism
