= Minuscule 634 =

- New Testament manuscript
- Text: Acts of the Apostles, Catholic epistles, Pauline epistles
- Date: 1394
- Script: Greek
- Now at: Vatican Library
- Size: 29.3 cm by 21.9 cm
- Type: Byzantine text-type
- Category: V

Minuscule 634 (in the Gregory-Aland numbering), α 462 (von Soden), is a Greek minuscule manuscript of the New Testament, on parchment. It is dated by a colophon to the year 1394. The manuscript is lacunose. Formerly it was labeled by 169^{a} and 206^{p}.

== Description ==
The codex contains the text of the Acts of the Apostles, Catholic epistles, Pauline epistles, on 248 parchment leaves (size 29.3 cm by 21.9 cm), with lacunae (Acts 1:1-7:23). Written in one column per page, 21 lines per page. It contains Prolegomena, the κεφαλαια, lectionary markings, incipits, αναγνωσεις, Synaxarion, Menologion, subscriptions at the end of each book, and numbers of στιχοι in subscriptions.

The order of books: Acts of the Apostles, Catholic epistles, and Pauline epistles. Epistle to the Hebrews is placed after Epistle to Philemon.

== Text ==
The Greek text of the codex is a representative of the Byzantine text-type. Kurt Aland placed it in Category V.

== History ==
The manuscript is dated by a colophon to the year 1394. It was written by Joasaph, in Constantinople, in the monastery των οδηγων. Synaxarion and Menologion were written by Joannes.

The manuscript was added to the list of New Testament manuscripts by Johann Martin Augustin Scholz, who slightly examined the manuscript.

Formerly it was labeled by 169^{a} and 206^{p}. In 1908 Gregory gave the number 634 to it.

The manuscript currently is housed at the Vatican Library (Chis. R V 29 (gr. 23)), at Rome.

== See also ==
- List of New Testament minuscules
- Biblical manuscript
- Textual criticism
