= Minuscule 612 =

- New Testament manuscript
- Text: Acts of the Apostles, Pauline epistles †
- Date: 12th century
- Script: Greek
- Now at: Turin National University Library
- Size: 21 cm by 15.5 cm
- Type: ?
- Category: none
- Hand: clear large hand

Minuscule 612 (in the Gregory-Aland numbering), α ^{297} (von Soden), is a Greek minuscule manuscript of the New Testament, on parchment. Palaeographically it has been assigned to the 12th century. The manuscript is lacunose. Formerly it was labeled by 134^{a} and 167^{p}.

== Description ==
The codex contains the text of the Acts of the Apostles, Catholic epistles, and Pauline epistles on 370 parchment leaves (size 21 cm by 15.5 cm), with lacunae (Acts 1:1-2:47). The lacking text was supplied by a later hand. The text is written in one column per page, 19 lines per page. It contains Prolegomena.

The order of books: Acts, Pauline epistles, and Catholic epistles. Hebrews is placed after Epistle to Philemon.

== Text ==
The Greek text of the codex Aland did not place in any Category.

== History ==
The manuscript was added to the list of New Testament manuscripts by Johann Martin Augustin Scholz. It was examined by Pasinus. Gregory saw the manuscript in 1886.

The manuscript was destroyed by fire.

The manuscript currently is housed at the Turin National University Library (B. V. 19; 33 folios in B. VI. 43), at Turin.

== See also ==
- List of New Testament minuscules
- Biblical manuscript
- Textual criticism
