= Minuscule 619 =

- New Testament manuscript
- Text: Acts of the Apostles, Pauline epistles
- Date: 984
- Script: Greek
- Now at: Laurentian Library
- Size: 33.5 cm by 24 cm
- Type: mixed
- Category: none

Minuscule 619 (in the Gregory-Aland numbering), α 57 (von Soden), is a Greek minuscule manuscript of the New Testament, on parchment. It is dated by a colophon to the 984. The manuscript has complex contents. Tischendorf labelled it by 148^{a} and 184^{p}.

== Description ==
The codex contains the text of the Acts of the Apostles, Pauline epistles on 342 parchment leaves (size 33.5 cm by 24 cm). The text is written in one column per page, 15 lines per page for the biblical text, 46 lines per page for a commentary.

It contains Prolegomena, numbers of the κεφαλαια (chapters) at the margin, the τιτλοι (titles) at the top, and a commentary.

The order of books: Acts of the Apostles, Catholic epistles, and Pauline epistles. Hebrews is placed after Epistle to Philemon.

== Text ==
The Greek text of the codex Aland did not place in any Category.

== History ==
The manuscript was written in A.D. 984, Indict 12, by Theophylact, priest and doctor of law. It once belonged to the Benedictine Library of St. Mary. It was examined by Bernard de Montfaucon.

Formerly it was labelled by 148^{a} and 184^{p}. In 1908 Gregory gave the number 619 to it.

The manuscript was added to the list of New Testament manuscripts by Johann Martin Augustin Scholz. Gregory saw the manuscript in 1886.

The manuscript currently is housed at the Laurentian Library (Conv. Supr. 191), at Florence.

== See also ==
- List of New Testament minuscules
- Biblical manuscript
- Textual criticism
- Minuscule 620
