= Minuscule 122 =

- New Testament manuscript
- Name: Lugdunensis-Batavorum
- Text: New Testament (except Rev.)
- Date: 12th century
- Script: Greek
- Now at: Leiden University Library
- Size: 18.1 cm by 14.1 cm
- Type: Byzantine text-type
- Category: V
- Note: full marginalia

Minuscule 122 is a Greek minuscule manuscript of the New Testament, written on parchment. It is designated by the siglum 122 in the Gregory-Aland numbering of New Testament manuscripts, and δ 258 in the von Soden numbering of New Testament manuscripts. Using the study of comparative writing styles (palaeography), it has been assigned to the 12th century. It has full marginal notes.

== Description ==
The manuscript is a codex (precursor to the modern book format), containing a near complete text of the New Testament except the Book of Revelation, written on 222 parchment leaves (sized 18.1 cm by 14.1 cm), with some missing portions: Acts 1:1-14; 21:15-22:28; 1 John 4:20-end; 2 John; 3 John; Jude; Romans 1:1-7:13; and 1 Corinthians 2:7-14:23. The text is written in one column per page, with 30-32 lines per page; the size of the text-block is 12.4 by 9 cm. The initial letters are written in red ink.

The text is divided according to the chapters (known as κεφαλαια / kephalaia), whose numbers are given in the margin, with their titles (known as τιτλοι / titloi) written at the top of the pages. There is also a division according to the Ammonian Sections (234 sections in Mark, the final at 16:8), with references to the Eusebian Canons written below the Ammonian Section numbers (both early divisions of the Gospels into different sections). It contains the Eusebian Canon tables, the content tables (also known as κεφαλαια) before each book, lectionary markings in the margin (for liturgical use), the numbers of lines (known as στιχοι / stichoi), a Menologion (list of weekly readings) to Acts, the Catholic Epistles and Pauline epistles, and the Euthalian Apparatus. Some corrections were made by a second hand.

Order of books

- Gospels
- Acts
- Catholic epistles
- Pauline epistles

== Text ==
The Greek text of the codex is considered to be a representative of the Byzantine text-type. Textual critic Hermann von Soden classified it to the textual family K^{1}. Biblical scholar Kurt Aland placed it in Category V of his New Testament manuscript classification system. Category V manuscripts are described as "manuscripts with a purely or predominantly Byzantine text." According to the Claremont Profile Method (a specific analysis of textual data), it represents textual family K^{x} in Luke 1, Luke 10, and Luke 20.

== History ==
The manuscript was written by Basilius, a monk and diakon. It was examined by biblical scholar Johann J. Griesbach. Biblical scholar Caspar René Gregory saw it in 1888.

It is currently dated by the INTF to the 12th century CE. It is presently housed at the Bibliotheek der Rijksuniversiteit (shelf number B. P. Gr. 74^{a}), at Leiden in Belgium.

== See also ==
- Minuscule 123
- Minuscule 121
- List of New Testament minuscules
- Biblical manuscript
- Textual criticism
