= Minuscule 620 =

- New Testament manuscript
- Text: Catholic epistles, Paul, Revelation
- Date: 12th century
- Script: Greek–Latin
- Now at: Laurentian Library
- Size: 18.5 cm by 13 cm
- Type: Byzantine text-type
- Category: V

Minuscule 620 (in the Gregory-Aland numbering), α 207 (von Soden), is a Greek–Latin diglot minuscule manuscript of the New Testament, on parchment. Palaeographically it has been assigned to the 12th century. The manuscript is lacunose. Tischendorf labeled it by 149^{a}, 349^{p}, and 180^{r}.

== Description ==
The codex contains the text of the Catholic epistles, Pauline epistles, and Book of Revelation on 150 parchment leaves (size 18.5 cm by 13 cm) with some lacunae. Written in two columns per page, 32 lines per page. Everything is written in abbreviations. It contains subscriptions at the end of each book with numbers of στιχοι.

The order of books: Catholic epistles, Book of Revelation, and Pauline epistles. Hebrews is placed after Epistle to Philemon.

== Text ==
The Greek text of the codex is a representative of the Byzantine text-type. Aland placed it in Category V.

== History ==
The manuscript was added to the list of New Testament manuscripts by Johann Martin Augustin Scholz, who slightly examined its text in Book of Acts. Gregory saw the manuscript in 1886. The Greek text of Apocalypse was examined by Herman C. Hoskier.

Formerly it was labeled by 149^{a}, 349^{p}, and 180^{r}. In 1908 Gregory gave the number 620 to it.

The manuscript currently is housed at the Laurentian Library (Conv. Soppr. 150), at Florence.

== See also ==
- List of New Testament minuscules
- Biblical manuscript
- Textual criticism
- Minuscule 619
