= Minuscule 608 =

- New Testament manuscript
- Text: Acts, Pauline epistles
- Date: 14th century
- Script: Greek
- Now at: Bibliothèque nationale de France
- Size: 29.4 cm by 20.7 cm
- Type: mixed
- Category: none

Minuscule 608 (in the Gregory-Aland numbering), OΘ ^{44} (von Soden), is a Greek minuscule manuscript of the New Testament, on parchment. Palaeographically, it has been assigned to the 14th century. The manuscript includes a variety of textual and marginal annotations, making its structure complex. Formerly it was labeled by 129^{a} and 156^{p}.

== Description ==
The codex contains the text of the Acts of the Apostles, Catholic epistles, Pauline epistles on 388 parchment leaves (size 29.4 cm by 20.7 cm). The text is written in two columns per page, 41 or more lines per page. Scrivener noted: "The text is sometimes suppressed". The text of the Catholic epistles is surrounded by a catena.

The order of books: Acts, Pauline epistles, and Catholic. The Epistle to the Hebrews is placed after the Epistle to Philemon.

== Text ==
The Greek text of the codex is a mixture of text-types. Aland did not place it in any Category.

== History ==
The manuscript was added to the list of New Testament manuscripts by Johann Martin Augustin Scholz. It was slightly examined by Scholz and Paulin Martin. Gregory saw the manuscript in 1885.

Formerly it was labeled by 129^{a} and 156^{p}. In 1908 Gregory gave the number 608 to it.

The manuscript currently is housed at the Bibliothèque nationale de France (Gr. 220), at Paris.

== See also ==
- List of New Testament minuscules
- Biblical manuscript
- Textual criticism
