= Minuscule 616 =

- New Testament manuscript
- Text: New Testament (except Gospels)
- Date: 1434
- Script: Greek
- Now at: Biblioteca Ambrosiana
- Size: 29.3 cm by 22 cm
- Type: Byzantine
- Category: V

Minuscule 616 (in the Gregory-Aland numbering), α 503 (von Soden), is a Greek minuscule manuscript of the New Testament, on paper. It is dated by a colophon to the 1434. The manuscript has complex contents. Tischendorf labelled it by 139^{a}, 174^{p}, and 156^{r}.

== Description ==
The codex contains the text of the New Testament except Gospels on 164 paper leaves (size 29.3 cm by 22 cm). The text is written in two columns per page, 31 lines per page. It contains Prolegomena at the beginning, subscriptions at the end of each book, and numbers of στιχοι.

The order of books: Acts of the Apostles, Catholic epistles, Pauline epistles, and Book of Revelation. Hebrews is placed after Epistle to Philemon.

== Text ==
The Greek text of the codex is a representative of the Byzantine text-type. Aland placed it in Category V.

== History ==
According to the colophon it was written on March 20, 1434, by Athanasius, for the wish of one Joannes.

The manuscript was bought in Padua in 1603 and came to Milan.

The manuscript was added to the list of New Testament manuscripts by Johann Martin Augustin Scholz. Gregory saw the manuscript in 1886. The text of the Apocalypse was collated by Herman C. Hoskier.

Formerly it was labelled by 139^{a}, 174^{p}, and 156^{r}. In 1908 Gregory gave the number 616 to it.

The manuscript currently is housed at the Biblioteca Ambrosiana (H. 104 sup.), at Milan.

== See also ==
- List of New Testament minuscules
- Biblical manuscript
- Textual criticism
