= Minuscule 633 =

Greek minuscule manuscript of the New Testament

- New Testament manuscript
- Text: Acts of the Apostles, Catholic epistles, Pauline epistles †
- Date: 14th century
- Script: Greek
- Now at: Biblioteca Vallicelliana
- Size: 17.5 cm by 12.4 cm
- Type: Byzantine text-type
- Category: V

Minuscule 633 (in the Gregory-Aland numbering), α 451 (von Soden), is a Greek minuscule manuscript of the New Testament, on paper. Palaeographically, it has been assigned to the 14th century. The manuscript is lacunose. Formerly it was labelled by 168^{a} and 205^{p}.

== Description ==
The codex contains the text of the Acts of the Apostles, Catholic epistles, Pauline epistles, on 204 paper leaves (size 17.5 cm by 12.4 cm), with only one lacuna (Acts 1:1-7:23). The text is written in one column per page, 40 lines per page.

It contains Prolegomena, the αναγνωσεις, subscriptions at the end of each book, and στιχοι.

The order of books: Acts of the Apostles, Catholic epistles, and Pauline epistles. Epistle to the Hebrews is placed after Epistle to Philemon.

== Text ==
The Greek text of the codex is a representative of the Byzantine text-type. Kurt Aland placed it in Category V.

== History ==
The manuscript is dated by the INTF to the 14th century.

The manuscript was added to the list of New Testament manuscripts by Johann Martin Augustin Scholz, who slightly examined the manuscript.

Formerly it was labelled by 168^{a} and 205^{p}. In 1908 Gregory gave the number 633 to it.

The manuscript currently is housed at the Biblioteca Vallicelliana (F. 13), at Rome.

== See also ==
- List of New Testament minuscules
- Biblical manuscript
- Textual criticism
