= Minuscule 628 =

- New Testament manuscript
- Name: Ottobonianus
- Text: New Testament (except Gospels) †
- Date: 14th century
- Script: Greek–Latin
- Now at: Vatican Library
- Size: 24.7 cm by 18.7 cm
- Type: Byzantine text-type
- Category: V

Minuscule 628 (in the Gregory-Aland numbering), α 400 (von Soden), is a Greek–Latin diglot minuscule manuscript of the New Testament, on paper. Palaeographically it has been assigned to the 14th century. The manuscript is lacunose. Formerly it was labeled by 161^{a}, 198^{p}, and 69^{r}.

== Description ==
The codex contains the text of the New Testament except the four Gospels, on 216 paper leaves (size 24.7 cm by 18.7 cm), with lacunae at the beginning and end (Acts 1:1-2:27; Revelation 18:22-22:21). It is written in two columns per page, 30-32 lines per page. Text Greek and Latin in parallel columns. It contains Prolegomena, and subscriptions at the end of each book.

The order of books: Acts of the Apostles, Catholic epistles, Pauline epistles, and Book of Revelation. Epistle to the Hebrews is placed after Epistle to Philemon.

== Text ==
The Greek text of the codex is a representative of the Byzantine text-type. Kurt Aland placed it in Category V.

== History ==
Scrivener dated the manuscript to the 13th century, Gregory and Aland to the 14th century. Actually it is dated by the INTF to the 14th century.

The manuscript was added to the list of New Testament manuscripts by Johann Martin Augustin Scholz, who slightly examined the whole manuscript.

It was examined and described by Giuseppe Cozza-Luzi. C. R. Gregory saw the manuscript in 1886. Herman C. Hoskier collated the text of the Apocalypse.

Formerly it was labeled by 161^{a}, 198^{p}, and 69^{r}. In 1908 Gregory gave the number 628 to it.

It was examined and described by Ernesto Feron and Fabiano Battaglini.

The manuscript currently is housed at the Vatican Library (Ottobonianus gr. 258), at Rome.

== See also ==
- List of New Testament minuscules
- Biblical manuscript
- Textual criticism
