= Minuscule 635 =

- New Testament manuscript
- Name: Codex Regius Neapolitanus
- Text: Acts of the Apostles, Catholic epistles, Pauline epistles
- Date: 11th century
- Script: Greek
- Now at: Biblioteca Nazionale Vittorio Emanuele III
- Size: 22.3 cm by 17.2 cm
- Type: ?
- Category: none
- Note: marginalia

Minuscule 635 (in the Gregory-Aland numbering), α 161 (von Soden), is a Greek minuscule manuscript of the New Testament, on parchment. Palaeographically it has been assigned to the 11th century. The manuscript has complex contents. Formerly it was labeled by 173^{a} and 211^{p}. It has marginalia.

== Description ==
The codex contains the text of the Acts of the Apostles, Catholic epistles, Pauline epistles, on 243 parchment leaves (size 22.3 cm by 17.2 cm). The end of the Hebrews was supplied in the 16th century. It is written in one column per page, 22 lines per page.

The order of books: Acts of the Apostles, Catholic epistles, and Pauline epistles. Epistle to the Hebrews is placed after Epistle to Philemon.

The text is divided according to the κεφαλαια (chapters), whose numbers are given at the margin, and the τιτλοι (titles) at the top of the pages.

It contains Prolegomena, tables of the κεφαλαια (contents) before each book, lectionary markings at the margin, αναγνωσεις (lessons), subscriptions at the end of each book, numbers of στιχοι, and μαρτυριαι cited from the Scripture and profine writers.

== Text ==
Kurt Aland the Greek text of the codex did not place it in any Category. Tregelles suggested that it is probably the same copy as Minuscule 83, the readings ascribed to it being extracted from the margin of that manuscript.

== History ==
The manuscript is dated by the INTF to the 11th century.

The manuscript was added to the list of New Testament manuscripts by Johann Martin Augustin Scholz, who slightly examined the manuscript (173 on Scholz's list).

Formerly it was labeled by 173^{a} and 211^{p}. In 1908 Gregory gave the number 635 to it.

The manuscript currently is housed at the Biblioteca Nazionale (Ms. II. A. 8), at Naples.

== See also ==
- List of New Testament minuscules
- Biblical manuscript
- Textual criticism
