= 626 (disambiguation) =

626 may refer to:

- The year 626
- The number 626
- 626 Night Market in Arcadia, California
- Mazda 626, a family car produced by Mazda, predecessor of the Mazda 6
- Experiment 626, the codename for Stitch, a fictional alien character from the Lilo & Stitch franchise
- Inmate 626, the identification number of a prison inmate recruited as a Space Marine in StarCraft II: Wings of Liberty
- Area code 626
- Yemenia Flight 626
- Minuscule 626
- 626 is also the highest number in the Köchel catalogue of the compositions of Wolfgang Amadeus Mozart and is assigned to his last work, the Requiem, which he did not live to finish.
