= Minuscule 622 =

- New Testament manuscript
- Text: Catholic epistles, Paul †
- Date: 12th century
- Script: Greek
- Now at: Vatican Library
- Size: 35.9 cm by 28.5 cm
- Type: Byzantine text-type
- Category: V

Minuscule 622 (in the Gregory-Aland numbering), O ^{π23} (von Soden), is a Greek diglot minuscule manuscript of the New Testament, on parchment. Palaeographically it has been assigned to the 12th century. The manuscript is lacunose. Tischendorf labeled it by 155^{a} and 188^{p}.

== Description ==
The codex contains the text of the Catholic epistles, and Pauline epistles on 270 parchment leaves (size 35.9 cm by 28.5 cm) with some lacunae. It is written in one column per page, 20 lines per page.

It contains Prolegomena and a commentary to the Catholic epistles written by another hand.

The leaves 1 and 213 were supplied by a later hand (14th century?).

The order of books: Pauline epistles, and Catholic epistles. Hebrews is placed after Epistle to Philemon. It does not contain the Book of Acts.

== Text ==
The Greek text of the codex is a representative of the Byzantine text-type. Aland placed it in Category V.

== History ==
The manuscript was added to the list of New Testament manuscripts by Johann Martin Augustin Scholz. Gregory saw the manuscript in 1886.

Formerly it was labeled by 155^{a} and 188^{p}. In 1908 Gregory gave the number 622 to it.

The manuscript currently is housed at the Vatican Library (Vat. gr. 1430), at Rome.

== See also ==
- List of New Testament minuscules
- Biblical manuscript
- Textual criticism
