= Minuscule 641 =

- New Testament manuscript
- Text: Acts, Catholic epistles, Pauline epistles †
- Date: 11th century
- Script: Greek
- Now at: British Library
- Size: 29.8 cm by 23.4 cm
- Type: ?
- Category: none

Minuscule 641 (in the Gregory-Aland numbering), Ο^{16} (von Soden), is a Greek minuscule manuscript of the New Testament, on parchment. Palaeographically to the 11th century. The manuscript is lacunose. Gregory labeled it by 204^{a} and 260^{p}.

== Description ==
The codex contains the text of the Acts, Catholic epistles, Pauline epistles on 248 parchment leaves (size 29.8 cm by 23.4 cm) with some lacunae (Acts 4:15-32; Ephesians 6:21-24; Hebrews 13:24-25). The text is written in one column per page, 20 lines per page for biblical text, and 56 lines per page for a commentary.

It contains Prolegomena, tables of the κεφαλαια before each sacred book, subscriptions at the end of each book, and numbers of stichoi in subscriptions. It has a commentary of Oecumenius.

The order of books: Acts of the Apostles, Catholic epistles, and Pauline epistles. Epistle to the Hebrews is placed after Epistle to Philemon.

== Text ==
Kurt Aland the Greek text of the codex did not place in any Category.

== History ==
The manuscript is dated by the INTF to the 11th century.

The manuscript once belonged to Giovanni Cardinal de Salviatis († 1553), then to Pope Pius VI. It was bought in 1859 for the British Museum. The manuscript was added to the list of New Testament manuscripts by Gregory (as 204^{a} and 260^{p}). Gregory saw the manuscript in 1883. In 1908 Gregory gave the number 641 to it.

The manuscript is currently housed at the British Library (Add MS 22734) in London.

== See also ==
- List of New Testament minuscules
- Biblical manuscript
- Textual criticism
- Minuscule 640
- Minuscule 642
