= Minuscule 639 =

- New Testament manuscript
- Text: Acts, Catholic epistles, Paul †
- Date: 11th century
- Script: Greek
- Now at: Christ Church, Oxford
- Size: 20.5 by 15.5 cm
- Type: Byzantine text-type
- Category: V

Minuscule 639 (in the Gregory-Aland numbering, α 169 Soden). It is a Greek minuscule manuscript of the New Testament, on a parchment. It is dated palaeographically to the 11th century. The manuscript is lacunose. Formerly it was labeled by 192^{a} and 246^{p}.

== Description ==
The codex contains the text of the Acts of the Apostles, Catholic epistles, and Pauline epistles on 237 parchment leaves (20.5 by 15.5 cm) with some lacunae (Acts 21:6-23; 1 Peter 5:10-14). Some leaves were supplied on paper by a later hand. The text is written in one column per page, 22-24 lines per page in minuscule letters. The last folio, no. 237, is a palimpsest, the lower text was written in uncial letters, and belongs to the codex 0132.

It contains Prolegomena, tables of the κεφαλαια to the Catholic epistles, numbers of the κεφαλαια (chapters), lectionary markings at the margin, subscriptions at the end of each book, and numbers of στιχοι. Some lacking leaves were supplied in the 14th century on a paper, by one Micheal (Acts 1:1-3:20; 7:27-10:26; 10:38-11:19; 12:2-15:25).

The order of books: Acts of the Apostles, Catholic epistles, and Pauline epistles. Epistle to the Hebrews is placed after Epistle to Philemon.

== Text ==
The Greek text of the codex is a representative of the Byzantine text-type. Aland placed it in Category V.

== History ==
The manuscript was described by Kitchin. It was added to the list of New Testament manuscripts by Scrivener. Formerly it was labeled by 192^{a} and 246^{p}. In 1908 Gregory gave the number 639 to it.

The codex now is located in Christ Church College (Wake 37) at Oxford.

== See also ==
- List of New Testament minuscules
- Textual criticism
- Biblical manuscript
- Minuscule 638
- Minuscule 640
