= Minuscule 121 =

- New Testament manuscript
- Text: Gospels †
- Date: 1284
- Script: Greek
- Now at: Bibliothèque Sainte-Geneviève
- Size: 19.5 cm by 15 cm
- Type: Byzantine text-type
- Category: V
- Note: marginalia

Minuscule 121 is a Greek minuscule manuscript of the New Testament, written on parchment. It is designated by the siglum 121 in the Gregory-Aland numbering of New Testament manuscripts, and ε 366 in the von Soden numbering of New Testament manuscripts. It is dated by a colophon to the year 1284.

== Description ==
The manuscript is a codex (precursor to the modern book format), containing the text of the four Gospels on 241 parchment leaves (sized 19.5 cm by 15 cm), with one missing section: Matthew 5:21-8:24. The text is written in one column per page, 24 lines per page. The capital letters are written in coloured ink.

The text is divided according to the chapters (known as κεφαλαια / kephalaia), whose numbers are given in the margin, and their titles (known as τιτλοι / titloi) written at the top of the pages. There is also another division according to the smaller Ammonian Sections (241 in Mark 241, the last being at 16:20), but contains no reference to the Eusebian Canons (both early divisions of the Gospels into sections). It contains the chapter content tables (also known as κεφαλαια) before each Gospel, lectionary markings in the margin (for liturgical use), incipits, a Synaxarion, a Menologion, and subscriptions at the end of each Gospel.

== Text ==
The Greek text of the codex is considered to be a representative of the Byzantine text-type. Biblical scholar Hermann von Soden classified it to the textual family K^{x}. Biblical scholar Kurt Aland placed it in Category V of his New Testament manuscript classification system. Category V manuscripts are described as "manuscripts with a purely or predominantly Byzantine text."

According to the Claremont Profile Method (a specific analysis of textual data), it creates textual cluster 121, as a leading manuscript. It is textually close to Minuscule 64, 533, 662, 663, 1060, 1297, 1642, and 1665.

== History ==
According to the colophon, it was written in September 1284, by a copyist named Joasaph. It was examined by textual critics Johann J. Griesbach, Johann M. A. Scholz, Constantin von Tischendorf, and Paulin Martin.

Biblical scholar Caspar René Gregory saw it in 1884. It is presently housed at the Bibliothèque Sainte-Geneviève (3398), at Paris.

== See also ==
- Minuscule 122
- Minuscule 120
- List of New Testament minuscules
- Biblical manuscript
- Textual criticism
