= Minuscule 625 =

- New Testament manuscript
- Text: Acts, Catholic epistles, Paul
- Date: 12th century
- Script: Greek
- Now at: Vatican Library
- Size: 24 cm by 18 cm
- Type: Byzantine text-type
- Category: V

Minuscule 625 (in the Gregory-Aland numbering), α 159 (von Soden), is a Greek minuscule manuscript of the New Testament, on parchment. Palaeographically it has been assigned to the 12th century. The manuscript has complex contents. Tischendorf labelled it by 158^{a} and 192^{p}.

== Description ==
The codex contains the text of the Acts, Catholic epistles, and Pauline epistles on 481 parchment leaves (size 24 cm by 18 cm), it has not any lacunae. The text is written in one column per page, 21 lines per page.

It contains double Prolegomena, tables of the κεφαλαια before each book, numbers of the κεφαλαια at the margin, and the τιτλοι at the top. Lectionary markings and incipits were added by a later hand.

The leaf 481 with the ending of Hebrews was supplied in the 16th century.

The order of books: Acts, Catholic epistles, and Pauline epistles. The Epistle to the Hebrews is placed after Epistle to Philemon.

== Text ==
The Greek text of the codex is a representative of the Byzantine text-type. Aland placed it in Category V.

== History ==
The manuscript was added to the list of New Testament manuscripts by Johann Martin Augustin Scholz. From this copy Angelo Mai supplied the lacunae of Codex Vaticanus in the Pauline epistles. Gregory saw the manuscript in 1886.

Formerly it was labelled by 158^{a} and 192^{p}. In 1908 Gregory gave the number 625 to it.

The manuscript currently is housed at the Vatican Library (Vat. gr. 1761), at Rome.

== See also ==
- List of New Testament minuscules
- Biblical manuscript
- Textual criticism
