= Minuscule 606 =

- New Testament manuscript
- Text: Acts of the Apostles, Pauline epistles
- Date: 11th century
- Script: Greek
- Now at: Bibliothèque nationale de France
- Size: 33.2 cm by 25.6 cm
- Type: mixed
- Category: none
- Hand: carelessly written

Minuscule 606 (in the Gregory-Aland numbering), OΘ ^{10} (von Soden), is a Greek minuscule manuscript of the New Testament, on parchment. Palaeographically it has been assigned to the 11th century. The manuscript is lacunose. Formerly it was labeled by 127^{a} and 154^{p}.

== Description ==
The codex contains the text of the Acts of the Apostles, Catholic epistles, Pauline epistles on 373 parchment leaves (size 33.2 cm by 25.6 cm), with only one lacuna (Philemon 7-25). The text is written in one column per page, 28-31 lines per page. The manuscript is carelessly written.

It contains Prolegomena, tables of the κεφαλαια (tables of contents) before each book, subscriptions at the end of each book, and numbers of στιχοι. It has scholia to the Catholic epistles. The biblical text is surrounded by a catena. The commentary is of Theodoret's authorship.

The order of books: Acts, Catholic, and Pauline epistles. Epistle to the Hebrews is placed after Epistle to Ephesians and before Epistle to the Philippians.

== Text ==
The Greek text of the codex is a mixture of text-types. Aland did not place it in any Category.

== History ==
The manuscript was added to the list of New Testament manuscripts by Johann Martin Augustin Scholz. It was collated by Reiche. It was examined and described by Paulin Martin. C. R. Gregory saw the manuscript in 1885.

Formerly it was labeled by 127^{a} and 154^{p}. In 1908 Gregory gave the number 606 to it.

The manuscript currently is housed at the Bibliothèque nationale de France (Gr. 217), at Paris.

== See also ==
- List of New Testament minuscules
- Biblical manuscript
- Textual criticism
