= Minuscule 611 =

- New Testament manuscript
- Text: Acts of the Apostles, Pauline epistles †
- Date: 12th century
- Script: Greek
- Now at: Turin National University Library
- Size: 20.4 cm by 14.6 cm
- Type: Byzantine text-type
- Category: none
- Hand: clear large hand

Minuscule 611 (in the Gregory-Aland numbering), α ^{250} (von Soden), is a Greek minuscule manuscript of the New Testament, on parchment. Palaeographically it has been assigned to the 12th century. The manuscript is lacunose. Formerly it was labeled by 133^{a} and 166^{p}.

== Description ==
The codex contains the text of the Acts of the Apostles, Catholic epistles, and Pauline epistles on 295 parchment leaves (size 20.4 cm by 14.6 cm), with lacunae (Acts 1:1-8; Romans 1:1-11). The lacking text was supplied by a later hand. It is written in one column per page, 24 lines per page, in a clear large hand.

It contains Prolegomena and pictures. The text of the Catholic epistles is surrounded by a catena.

The order of books: Acts, Catholic epistles, and Pauline epistles. Hebrews is precede 1 Timothy.

== Text ==
Aland the Greek text of the codex did not place in any Category.

According to Hort it has good text in the Catholic epistles with remarkable readings.

== History ==
The manuscript was added to the list of New Testament manuscripts by Johann Martin Augustin Scholz. It was examined by Hort and Pasinus. Gregory saw the manuscript in 1886.

Formerly it was labeled by 133^{a} and 166^{p}. In 1908 Gregory gave the number 611 to it.

The manuscript was destroyed by fire.

The manuscript currently is housed at the Turin National University Library (C. VI. 19), at Turin.

== See also ==
- List of New Testament minuscules
- Biblical manuscript
- Textual criticism
