= Minuscule 636 =

- New Testament manuscript
- Text: Acts of the Apostles, Catholic epistles, Pauline epistles
- Date: 15th century
- Script: Greek
- Now at: Biblioteca Nazionale Vittorio Emanuele III
- Size: 22 cm by 14.5 cm
- Type: ?
- Category: none

Minuscule 636 (in the Gregory-Aland numbering), α 598 (von Soden), is a Greek minuscule manuscript of the New Testament, on paper. Palaeographically it has been assigned to the 15th century. The manuscript has complex contents. Formerly it was labeled by 174^{a} and 212^{p}.

== Description ==
The codex contains the text of the Acts of the Apostles, Catholic epistles, Pauline epistles, on 211 paper leaves (size 22 cm by 14.5 cm). The end of the Hebrews was supplemented in the 16th century. It is written in one column per page, 22-27 lines per page.

It contains Prolegomena, tables of the κεφαλαια before each book, lectionary markings, incipits, subscriptions at the end of each book, and στιχοι.

The order of books: Acts of the Apostles, Catholic epistles, and Pauline epistles. Epistle to the Hebrews is placed after Epistle to Philemon.

It contains the Comma Johanneum in the margin added by a later hand.

== Text ==
Kurt Aland the Greek text of the codex did not place in any Category.

== History ==
The manuscript was written by Presbyter Nicolaus. It is dated by the INTF to the 15th century.

The manuscript was added to the list of New Testament manuscripts by Johann Martin Augustin Scholz, who slightly examined the major part of the manuscript. Gregory saw it in 1886.

Formerly it was labeled by 174^{a} and 212^{p}. In 1908 Gregory gave the number 636 to it.

The manuscript currently is housed at the Biblioteca Nazionale (Ms. II. A. 9), at Naples.

== See also ==
- List of New Testament minuscules
- Biblical manuscript
- Textual criticism
