= Minuscule 725 =

- New Testament manuscript
- Text: Gospels
- Date: 13th century
- Script: Greek
- Now at: Royal Library of Belgium
- Size: 15.5 cm by 11.5 cm
- Type: Byzantine text-type
- Category: V
- Note: –

Minuscule 725 (in the Gregory-Aland numbering), ε383 (von Soden), is a Greek minuscule manuscript of the New Testament written on parchment. Palaeographically it has been assigned to the 13th century. The manuscript has complex contents. Scrivener labelled it as 881^{e}.

== Description ==
The codex contains the text of the four Gospels on 210 parchment leaves (size 15.5 cm by 11.5 cm).

The text is written in single columns per page, 24-26 lines per page.

The text is divided according to the κεφαλαια (chapters), whose numbers are given at the margin, and their τιτλοι (titles of chapters) at the top. There is also a division according to the smaller Ammonian Sections, but without references to the Eusebian Canons.

It contains Prolegomena, lists of the κεφαλαια, subscriptions at the end of each Gospel, numbers of στιχοι, Synaxarion, and pictures.

== Text ==
The Greek text of the codex is a representative of the Byzantine text-type. Hermann von Soden classified it to the textual family K^{x}. Aland placed it in Category V.

According to the Claremont Profile Method it represents K^{x} in Luke 1 and Luke 20. In Luke 10 no profile was made.

In John 8:9 it reads αναγινωσκοντες for ακουσαντες as minuscule 651.

== History ==
Gregory dated the manuscript to the 13th century. The manuscript is currently dated by the INTF to the 13th century.

It was added to the list of New Testament manuscripts by Scrivener (881) and Gregory (725). Gregory saw the manuscript in 1891.

The manuscript is now housed at the Royal Library of Belgium (11358) in Brussels.

== See also ==
- List of New Testament minuscules
- Biblical manuscript
- Textual criticism
