= Minuscule 638 =

- New Testament manuscript
- Text: Acts, Catholic epistles, Paul
- Date: 11th century
- Script: Greek
- Now at: Christ Church, Oxford
- Size: 17.5 cm by 13.5 cm
- Type: Byzantine text-type
- Category: V
- Hand: small and neat

Minuscule 638 (in the Gregory-Aland numbering), α 188 (von Soden), is a Greek minuscule manuscript of the New Testament, on parchment. Palaeographically to the 11th century. The manuscript is lacunose. Scrivener labelled it by 191^{a} and 245^{p}.

== Description ==
The codex contains the text of the Acts of the Apostles, Catholic epistles, Pauline epistles, on 306 parchment leaves (size 17.5 cm by 13.5 cm), with lacuna (Acts 1:1-11). It is written in one columns per page, 23 lines per page.

It contains Prolegomena, Euthalian Apparatus, tables of the κεφαλαια before each book, numbers of the κεφαλαια, τιτλοι at the top, Synaxarion, Menologion, subscriptions at the end of each book, numbers of στιχοι in subscriptions, and scholia. It contains a catena added by a later hand and dated to the 1312.

The order of books: Acts of the Apostles, Catholic epistles, and Pauline epistles. Epistle to the Hebrews is placed after Epistle to Philemon.

== Text ==
The Greek text of the codex is a representative of the Byzantine text-type. Kurt Aland placed it in Category V.

== History ==
The manuscript is dated by INTF to the 11th century. Formerly it was housed in Mar Saba. In 1731 it was brought from Constantinople to England.

The manuscript was examined by Walker. It was added to the list of the New Testament manuscripts by Scrivener. Gregory saw the manuscript in 1886.

Formerly it was labelled it by 191^{a} and 245^{p}. In 1908 Gregory gave the number 638 to it.

The manuscript currently is housed at the library of Christ Church College (Wake 38), at Oxford.

== See also ==
- List of New Testament minuscules
- Biblical manuscript
- Textual criticism
- Minuscule 639
