= Minuscule 631 =

- New Testament manuscript
- Name: Ottobonianus gr. 417
- Text: General epistles
- Date: 15th century
- Script: Greek
- Now at: Vatican Library
- Size: 21.4 cm by 17.7 cm
- Type: ?
- Category: none

Minuscule 631 (in the Gregory-Aland numbering), α 1604 (von Soden), is a Greek minuscule manuscript of the New Testament on paper. It is known as Codex Ottobonianus. Palaeographically it has been assigned to the 15th century. Formerly it was labeled by 165^{a}.

== Description ==
The codex contains the text of the General epistles on 24 paper leaves (size 21.4 cm by 17.7 cm). It is written in one column per page, 21 lines per page. The order of books is unusual: James, 1-2 Peter, 1 John, Jude, 2-3 John.

It has also contains the works of Ephrem the Syrian and other Church Fathers. The whole manuscript has 339 leaves.

The whole codex contents
folios 17-48 — Pauline epistles
folios 49-72 — General epistles
folios 73-339 — works of Ephrem and other Church Fathers

== Text ==
The Greek text of the codex was not placed by Kurt Aland in any Category.

== History ==
Scrivener dated the manuscript to the 14th century, Gregory dated it to the 16th century. Actually it is dated by the INTF to the 15th century.

The manuscript was added to the list of New Testament manuscripts by Johann Martin Augustin Scholz, who slightly examined the manuscript. It was examined and described by Giuseppe Cozza-Luzi. C. R. Gregory saw the manuscript in 1886.

Formerly it was labeled by 165^{a}. In 1908 Gregory gave the number 631 to it.

The manuscript currently is housed at the Vatican Library (Ottob. gr. 417, fol. 49-72), at Rome.

== See also ==
- List of New Testament minuscules
- Biblical manuscript
- Textual criticism
