= Minuscule 687 =

Greek minuscule manuscript of the New Testament

- New Testament manuscript
- Text: Gospel of Matthew †
- Date: 11th century
- Script: Greek
- Now at: British Library
- Size: 23.4 cm by 17.2 cm
- Type: ?
- Category: none

Minuscule 687 (in the Gregory-Aland numbering), ε1124 (von Soden), is a Greek minuscule manuscript of the New Testament, on parchment. Palaeographically it has been assigned to the 11th century. The manuscript has survived in a fragmentary condition. Scrivener labelled it by 579^{e}.

== Description ==
The codex contains fragments of the Gospel of Matthew, on 7 parchment leaves (size 23.4 cm by 17.2 cm). The text is written in two columns per page, 29 lines per page.

Contents

Matthew 10:33-11:12, 13:44-14:6, 15:14-18.20-22.26-29.30-32, 15:34-17:10, 17:12-15.18-20.22-24; 17:26-18:16.

The text is divided according to the κεφαλαια (chapters), which numbers are given at the left margin of the text, and their τιτλοι (titles) at the top of the page. There is also a division into smaller sections, the Ammonian Sections, with a references to the Eusebian Canons. Lectionary markings were added by a later hand.

== Text ==
Kurt Aland the Greek text of the codex did not place in any Category.

== History ==
Scrivener and Gregory dated the manuscript to the 11th century. Currently the manuscript is dated by the INTF to the 11th century.

The manuscript once belonged to the Butler collection.

It was added to the list of New Testament manuscript by Scrivener (579) and Gregory (687).

The manuscript is housed at the British Library (Add MS 11868B), London.

== See also ==
- List of New Testament minuscules
- Biblical manuscript
- Textual criticism
