= Minuscule 668 =

- New Testament manuscript
- Text: Gospels
- Date: 13th/14th century
- Script: Greek
- Now at: Syracuse University
- Size: 20 cm by 16 cm
- Type: Byzantine text-type
- Category: V

Minuscule 668 (in the Gregory-Aland numbering), ε 1205 (von Soden), is a Greek minuscule manuscript of the New Testament, on parchment. Palaeographically it has been assigned to the 13th or 14th century. The manuscript has complex contents. Scrivener labelled it by 1144^{e}.

== Description ==
The codex contains the entire of the four Gospels, on 201 parchment leaves (size 20 cm by 16 cm). The text is written in one column per page, 25-28 lines per page.

The heading for the Gospel of Mark is titled εκ του κατά Μάρκου. (Note: In this way are titled the headings of the Gospels in manuscripts: 69, 178, 543.)

The lists of the κεφαλαια are placed before every book, the text is divided according to the κεφαλαια (chapters), with τιτλοι (titles). The Ammonian Sections are given (in Mark 234 Sections - last numbered section in 16:9), with references to the Eusebian Canons.

It contains lectionary markings at the margin (for liturgical use), Synaxarion, Menologion, and pictures.

== Text ==
The Greek text of the codex is a representative of the Byzantine text-type. Kurt Aland placed it in Category V.

According to C. R. Gregory it has good readings.

According to the Claremont Profile Method it belongs to the textual family K^{x} in Luke 1; 10; 20.

== History ==
Gregory dated it to the 12th century. Currently the manuscript is dated by the INTF to the 13th or 14th century.

The manuscript was bought by Albert L. Long in Constantinople (see Minuscule 667).

Gregory saw the manuscript in 1885 in Paris. The manuscript was collated by H. H. Severn in 1928 in his unpublished Ph.D. thesis.

Currently the manuscript is housed at the Syracuse University (Ms. 226.048G), in Syracuse, New York.

== See also ==
- List of New Testament minuscules
- Biblical manuscript
- Textual criticism
