= Minuscule 663 =

- New Testament manuscript
- Text: Gospels
- Date: 13th century
- Script: Greek
- Now at: Bibliothèque nationale et universitaire
- Size: 16 cm by 11 cm
- Type: Byzantine text-type
- Category: V

Minuscule 663 (in the Gregory-Aland numbering), ε 387 (von Soden), is a Greek minuscule manuscript of the New Testament, on parchment. Palaeographically it has been assigned to the 13th century. The manuscript is lacunose.

== Description ==
The codex contains the text of the four Gospels, on 277 parchment leaves (size 16 cm by 11 cm), with only one lacuna (Matthew 26:27-39). The text is written in one column per page, 18 lines per page, in very small letters.

It contains lists of the κεφαλαια before each of the Gospels, numbers of the κεφαλαια (chapters) at the margin, the τιτλοι (titles) at the top of the pages, the Ammonian Sections, references to the Eusebian Canons, and lectionary markings.

== Text ==
The Greek text of the codex is a representative of the Byzantine text-type. Hermann von Soden classified to the textual family K^{x}. Kurt Aland placed it in Category V.

According to the Wisse's Profile Method it belongs to the textual cluster Cl 121.

Textually it is close to the Complutensian Polyglot.

== History ==
Gregory dated the manuscript to the 13th century. Currently the manuscript is dated by the INTF to the 13th century.

The manuscript was presented by Nicephorus Glykas, Bishop of Imbro, to Eduard Reuss.

The manuscript was added to the list of New Testament manuscripts by Scrivener. Gregory saw it in 1887.

Currently the manuscript is housed at the Bibliothèque nationale et universitaire (Ms. 1907), in Strasbourg.

== See also ==
- List of New Testament minuscules
- Biblical manuscript
- Textual criticism
