= Minuscule 626 =

- New Testament manuscript
- Text: Acts, Catholic epistles
- Date: 10th century
- Script: Greek
- Now at: Vatican Library
- Size: 15.9 cm by 10.6 cm
- Type: Byzantine text-type
- Category: V

Minuscule 626 (in the Gregory-Aland numbering), α 1010 (von Soden), is a Greek minuscule manuscript of the New Testament, on parchment. Palaeographically it has been assigned to the 10th century. The manuscript is lacunose. Tischendorf labeled it by 159^{a}.

== Description ==
The codex contains the text of the Acts, Epistle of James, and First Epistle of Peter on 84 parchment leaves (size 15.9 cm by 10.6 cm), with lacunae (Acts 1:1-5:29; 6:14-7:11). The text is written in one column per page, 22 lines per page.

It contains double Prolegomena, tables of the κεφαλαια before each book, numbers of the κεφαλαια at the margin, the τιτλοι at the top of the pages, Lectionary markings at the margin, and subscriptions at the end of each book. Scholia, whose authors' names are given, were added by a later hand.

== Text ==
The Greek text of the codex is a representative of the Byzantine text-type. Aland placed it in Category V.

== History ==
Formerly it was known as Basilian 7. The manuscript was added to the list of New Testament manuscripts by Johann Martin Augustin Scholz, who slightly examined the manuscript. Gregory saw the manuscript in 1886.

Formerly it was labeled by 159^{a}. In 1908 Gregory gave the number 626 to it.

The manuscript currently is housed at the Vatican Library (Vat. gr. 1968), at Rome.

== See also ==
- List of New Testament minuscules
- Biblical manuscript
- Textual criticism
