= Minuscule 647 =

- New Testament manuscript
- Text: Gospels
- Date: 11th century
- Script: Greek
- Now at: Walters Art Museum
- Size: 25 cm by 19 cm
- Type: ?
- Category: none

Minuscule 647 (in the Gregory-Aland numbering), ε 1611 (von Soden), is a Greek minuscule manuscript of the New Testament, on parchment. Palaeographically it has been assigned to the 13th century, and more recently, to the 11th century. The manuscript is lacunose. Scrivener labelled by 722^{e}.

== Description ==
The codex contains the text of the four Gospels, on 304 parchment leaves (size 25 cm by 19 cm), with only one lacuna at the end of Gospel of John (John 21:20-25). The text is written in two columns per page, 25 lines per page, by a single hand.

It contains the Epistula ad Carpianum, the Eusebian tables, Prolegomena, the tables of the κεφαλαια (chapters) are placed before each of the Gospels, the text is divided according to the Ammonian Sections (in Mark 240 - 16:19), with a references to the Eusebian Canons, Synaxarion, Menologion, and subscriptions at the end each of the Gospels.

== Text ==
The Greek text of the codex Kurt Aland did not place in any Category. It was not examined by using Claremont Profile Method. In result its textual character is still not determined.

The text of John 5:3.4 is marked with an obelus.

== History ==
Formerly the manuscript was held in Constantinople (Hagia Taphu 520/275). It was added to the list of New Testament manuscripts by Scrivener. Gregory saw it in 1886. Scrivener and Gregory dated the manuscript to the 13th century. Currently it is dated by the INTF to the 11th century.

The manuscript was presumed lost after the First World War, but was recently identified at the Walters Art Museum in Baltimore, where it bears the shelfmark W.529.

== See also ==
- List of New Testament minuscules
- Biblical manuscript
- Textual criticism
