= Minuscule 650 =

- New Testament manuscript
- Text: Gospels †
- Date: 12th century
- Script: Greek
- Now at: Turkish Historical Society
- Size: 17.5 cm by 13 cm
- Type: Byzantine text-type
- Category: V

Minuscule 650 is a Greek minuscule manuscript of the New Testament Gospels, written on parchment. It is designated by the siglum 650 in the Gregory-Aland numbering of New Testament manuscripts, and ε 399 in the von Soden numbering of New Testament manuscripts. Using the study of comparative writing styles (palaeography), it has been dated to the 12th century. Biblical scholar Frederick H. A. Scrivener labelled it as 726^{e}.

== Description ==
The manuscript is a codex (precursor to the modern book format), containing the text of the New Testament Gospels, made of 219 parchment leaves (sized 17.5 cm by 13 cm), with some gaps: Matthew 1:1-10:1; Luke 23:39-56; and John 1:1-18. The text is written in one column per page, 18-24 lines per page.

It contains the tables of contents (known as κεφαλαια / kephalaia) before each Gospel, the Ammonian Sections but not the Eusebian Canons (both early divisions of the Gospels into sections.), lectionary markings in the margin (for liturgical use), incipits, the liturgical books with hagiographies known as the Synaxarion and Menologion, subscriptions at the end of each Gospel, and the numbers of lines (known as στιχοι / stichoi).

== Text ==
The Greek text of the codex is considered to be a representative of the Byzantine text-type. Biblical scholar Kurt Aland placed it in Category V of his New Testament manuscript classification system. Category V manuscripts are described as "manuscripts with a purely or predominantly Byzantine text." The manuscript was not examined by scholar Frederik Wise using his Profile Method (a specific analysis of textual data).

== History ==
The earliest history of the manuscript is unknown. It was once held in Constantinople (Hellenikou Philologikou Sullogou 5). It was first added to the Greek New Testament manuscript list by Scrivener, and then by biblical scholar Caspar René Gregory, who saw it in 1886.

Scrivener and Gregory dated the manuscript to the 13th century. The manuscript is currently dated by the INTF to the 12th century. It is presently housed at the Turkish Historical Society (shelf number 5), in Ankara.

== See also ==
- List of New Testament minuscules
- Biblical manuscript
- Textual criticism
- Minuscule 649
