= Minuscule 697 =

- New Testament manuscript
- Text: Gospels
- Date: 13th century
- Script: Greek
- Found: 1865
- Now at: British Library
- Size: 20.3 cm by 15.3 cm
- Type: Byzantine text-type/mixed
- Category: none

Minuscule 697 (in the Gregory-Aland numbering), ε1389 (von Soden), is a Greek minuscule manuscript of the New Testament, on parchment. Palaeographically it has been assigned to the 13th century. The manuscript has complex contents. Scrivener labelled it as 601^{e}.

== Description ==
The codex contains the text of the four Gospels on 350 parchment leaves (size 20.3 cm by 15.3 cm). The text is written in one column per page, 25 lines per page.

The text is divided according to the κεφαλαια (chapters), the numbers appearing at the margin; the τιτλοι (titles) are given at the top. There is also a division according to the Ammonian Sections (in gold), but there are no references to the Eusebian Canons. It contains a portrait of John, the Evangelist.

According to Scrivener it is "beautifully written in very black ink, the first page of each Gospel being in gold".

== Text ==
Kurt Aland the Greek text of the codex did not place in any Category.

According to the Claremont Profile Method it represents textual group 22a in Luke 1, Luke 10, and Luke 20.

== History ==
Scrivener dated the manuscript to the 14th century. Gregory dated it to the 13th or 14th century. Currently the manuscript is dated by the INTF to the 13th century.

The manuscript was found in a village near Corinth, and bought by C. L. Merlin, British vice-consul in Athens, in 1865.

It was added to the list of New Testament manuscripts by Scrivener (his 601) and Gregory (his 697). It was examined and described by S. T. Bloomfield, and Dean Burgon. Gregory saw the manuscript in 1883.

The manuscript is currently housed at the British Library (Add MS 26103) in London.

== See also ==
- List of New Testament minuscules
- Biblical manuscript
- Textual criticism
