= Minuscule 675 =

- New Testament manuscript
- Text: Gospel of Matthew †
- Date: 13th century
- Script: Greek
- Now at: Cambridge University Library
- Size: 20.5 cm by 13.7 cm
- Type: ?
- Category: none

Minuscule 675 (in the Gregory-Aland numbering), ε 446 (von Soden), is a Greek minuscule manuscript of the New Testament, on parchment. Palaeographically it has been assigned to the 13th century. The manuscript has survived in a fragmentary condition. Scrivener labelled it by 621^{e}.

== Description ==
The codex contains the text of the Gospel of Matthew 26:20-39, on 2 parchment leaves (size 20.5 cm by 13.7 cm), The text is written in one column per page, 26 lines per page.

The text is divided according to the κεφαλαια (chapters), whose numerals are given at the margin, and their τιτλοι (titles) at the top. There is also a division according to the Ammonian Sections, but no a references to the Eusebian Canons.

It contains a lectionary markings at the margin and Prolegomena to the Gospel of Mark.

== Text ==
Kurt Aland did not place the Greek text of the codex in any Category.

== History ==
Scrivener and Gregory dated it to the 13th or 14th century. Currently the manuscript is dated by the INTF to the 13th century.

The manuscript belonged to Tischendorf (along with Minuscule 674). It was bought after his death, in 1876. It was added to the list of New Testament manuscripts by Scrivener and Gregory. C. R. Gregory saw it in 1883. It was examined by Hort and Brandshaw.

Actually the manuscript is housed at the Cambridge University Library (Add. Mss. 1879.24) in Cambridge.

== See also ==
- List of New Testament minuscules
- Biblical manuscript
- Textual criticism
