= Minuscule 695 =

- New Testament manuscript
- Text: Gospels †
- Date: 13th century
- Script: Greek
- Now at: British Library
- Size: 24.1 cm by 19.3 cm
- Type: Byzantine text-type/mixed
- Category: none

Minuscule 695 (in the Gregory-Aland numbering), ε327 (von Soden), is a Greek minuscule manuscript of the New Testament, on parchment. Palaeographically it has been assigned to the 13th century. The manuscript is lacunose. Scrivener labelled it by 599^{e}.

== Description ==
The codex contains the text of the four Gospels on 299 parchment leaves (size 24.1 cm by 19.3 cm), with some lacunae. The text is written in one column per page, 20 lines per page. It lacks text of Matthew 1:11-15:18.

It contains Epistula ad Carpianum and the Eusebian tables at the beginning. The tables of the κεφαλαια (contents) are placed before each Gospel, numbers of the κεφαλαια (chapters) are given at the left margin, there are no the τιτλοι (titles) at the top. There is also division according to the Ammonian Sections (in Mark 241), with a references to the Eusebian Canons. It contains Prolegomena, lectionary markings, incipits, αναγνωσεις (lessons), Synaxarion, Menologion, ornamented headpieces, and subscriptions at the end.

== Text ==
Kurt Aland did not place the Greek text of the codex in any Category.

According to the Claremont Profile Method it has mixed text in Luke 1, mixed Byzantine text in Luke 10 relatively close to K^{x}, and K^{x} in Luke 20.

== History ==
Scrivener and Gregory dated the manuscript to the 13th century. Currently the manuscript is dated by the INTF to the 13th century.

The manuscript was bought in 1862 from H. S. Freeman, former consul in Janina.

It was added to the list of New Testament manuscript by Scrivener (599) and Gregory (695).

It was examined by S. T. Bloomfield and Dean Burgon. Gregory saw the manuscript in 1883.

The manuscript is currently housed at the British Library (Add MS 24373) in London.

== See also ==
- List of New Testament minuscules
- Biblical manuscript
- Textual criticism
