= Minuscule 649 =

- New Testament manuscript
- Text: Gospels †
- Date: 1305
- Script: Greek
- Now at: Turkish Historical Society
- Size: 29 cm by 22 cm
- Type: Byzantine text-type
- Category: V

Minuscule 649 (in the Gregory-Aland numbering), Θ^{ε 408} (von Soden), is a Greek minuscule manuscript of the New Testament, on paper. It is dated by a colophon to the year 1305 (?). The manuscript is lacunose. Scrivener labelled it by 725^{e}.

== Description ==
The codex contains the text of the four Gospels, on 296 paper leaves (size 29 cm by 22 cm), with some lacunae supplemented by a later hand. The text is written in two columns per page, 25-48 lines per page.

It contains the commentary, much of it by a later hand.

== Text ==
The Greek text of the codex is a representative of the Byzantine text-type. Kurt Aland placed it in Category V. Wisse did not examine its text by using his Profile Method.

== History ==
The colophon partially is illegible. Scrivener and Gregory dated the manuscript to the 1303. Currently the manuscript is dated by the INTF to the 1305 (?). The name of scribe was George.

Formerly the manuscript was held in Constantinople (Hellenikou Philologikou Sullogou 1). The manuscript was added to the list of New Testament manuscripts by Scrivener. Gregory saw the manuscript in 1886.

The manuscript currently is housed at the Turkish Historical Society (1), at Ankara.

== See also ==
- List of New Testament minuscules
- Biblical manuscript
- Textual criticism
- Minuscule 650
