= Minuscule 667 =

- New Testament manuscript
- Text: Gospels
- Date: 11th/12th century
- Script: Greek
- Now at: Drew University
- Size: 10.3 cm by 9.1 cm
- Type: Byzantine text-type
- Category: none

Minuscule 667 (in the Gregory-Aland numbering), ε 1185 (von Soden), is a Greek minuscule manuscript of the New Testament, on parchment. Palaeographically it has been assigned to the 11th or 12th century. The manuscript has complex contents. Scrivener labelled it by 900^{e}.

== Description ==
The codex contains the entire of the four Gospels, on 178 parchment leaves (size 10.3 cm by 9.1 cm). The text is written in one column per page, 25-28 lines per page, in very small letters. The lists of the κεφαλαια are placed before every book, the text is divided according to the κεφαλαια (chapters), whose numbers are given at the margin and their τιτλοι (titles) at the top.

The leaves 163 and 170 were supplemented in the 16th century.

== Text ==
The Greek text of the codex is a representative of the Byzantine text-type. Kurt Aland did not placed it in any Category.

According to the Wisse's Profile Method it belongs to the textual family K^{x} in Luke 1; 10; 20. It is close to the Codex Athous Dionysiou.

== History ==
Gregory dated it to the 11th or 12th century. Currently the manuscript is dated by the INTF to the 11th or 12th century.

The manuscript was bought by Albert L. Long in Constantinople (see Minuscule 668).

Gregory saw the manuscript in 1895.

Currently the manuscript is housed at the Drew University (Ms. 11), in Madison, New Jersey.

== See also ==
- List of New Testament minuscules
- Biblical manuscript
- Textual criticism
