= Minuscule 670 =

- New Testament manuscript
- Text: Gospels
- Date: 11th/12th century
- Script: Greek
- Now at: ?
- Size: 24 cm by 19 cm
- Type: ?
- Category: none

Minuscule 670 (in the Gregory-Aland numbering), ε 1186 (von Soden), is a Greek minuscule manuscript of the New Testament, on parchment. Palaeographically it has been assigned to the 11th or 12th century. The manuscript is very lacunose. Scrivener labelled it by 901^{e}.

== Description ==
The codex contains the text of the Gospel of Luke 8:3-24; 9:13-34, on only 2 parchment leaves (size 24 cm by 19 cm). The text is written in one column per page, 26 lines per page.

There are no divisions as the κεφαλαια or the Ammonian Sections.

== Text ==
The Greek text of the codex Kurt Aland did not place in any Category.

It was not examined by using the Claremont Profile Method.

The textual character of the codex can not be determined because it is a fragmentary condition.

== History ==
Gregory dated it to the 11th or 12th century. Currently the manuscript is dated by the INTF to the 11th or 12th century.

The manuscript was brought to America in 1844 from Crete, by George Benton (along with Minuscule 669). Formerly it belonged to La Crescenta/California, W.-L. Hall-Benton.

The manuscript was examined by Harris and Clark.

Currently the manuscript belongs to a private collection. Officially its owner is unknown.

== See also ==
- List of New Testament minuscules
- Biblical manuscript
- Textual criticism
- Minuscule 671
