= Minuscule 674 =

- New Testament manuscript
- Text: Gospel of Matthew †
- Date: 12th century
- Script: Greek
- Now at: Cambridge University Library
- Size: 22.5 cm by 15 cm
- Type: Byzantine text-type
- Category: V

Minuscule 674 (in the Gregory-Aland numbering), ε 271 (von Soden), is a Greek minuscule manuscript of the New Testament, on parchment. Palaeographically it has been assigned to the 12th century. The manuscript has survived in a very fragmentary condition. Scrivener labelled it by 620^{e}.

== Description ==
The codex contains the text of the Gospel of Matthew 10:42-12:43, on 4 parchment leaves (size 22.5 cm by 15 cm), The text is written in one column per page, 26 lines per page.

The text is divided according to the κεφαλαια (chapters), which numerals are given at the margin, and their τιτλοι (titles) at the top. There is also a division according to the Ammonian Sections, with a references to the Eusebian Canons. It contains a lectionary markings; αναγνωσεις (lessons) were added by a later hand.

== Text ==
The Greek text of the codex is a representative of the Byzantine text-type. Kurt Aland placed it in Category V.

It was not examined by using the Wisse's Profile Method.

== History ==
Scrivener and Gregory dated it to the 12th century. Currently the manuscript is dated by the INTF to the 12th century.

The manuscript was bought in 1876 from Tischendorf's collection (along with Minuscule 675). It was added to the list of New Testament manuscripts by Scrivener and Gregory. Gregory saw it in 1883. It was examined by Hort and Brandshaw.

Actually the manuscript is housed at the Cambridge University Library (Add. Mss. 1879.11) in Cambridge.

== See also ==
- List of New Testament minuscules
- Biblical manuscript
- Textual criticism
