= Minuscule 669 =

Byzantine manuscript of the gospels

- New Testament manuscript
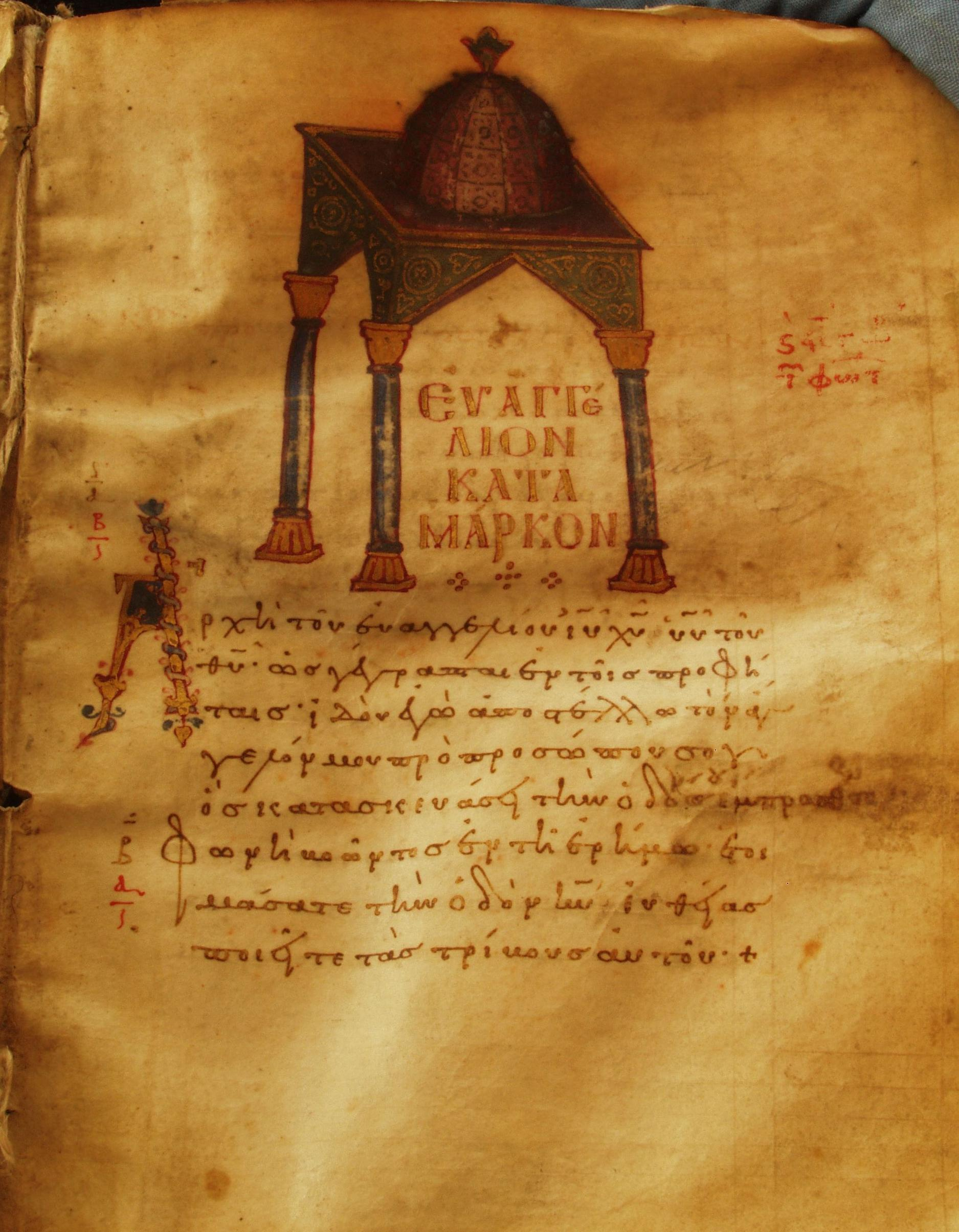
- The first page of Mark with baldachin headpiece
- Name: Benton Gospel 3
- Text: Gospels
- Date: 10th/11th century
- Script: Greek
- Found: 1844, Crete
- Now at: Dumbarton Oaks, Ms. 6, (Acc. No. BZ.2017.001)
- Cite: J. R. Harris, Sunday School Times
- Size: 19.6 cm by 16.6 cm
- Type: Byzantine text-type
- Category: V

Minuscule 669 (in the Gregory-Aland numbering), ε 1025 (Soden), known as Benton Gospel 3, is a Greek minuscule manuscript of the New Testament, on parchment. It is dated palaeographically to the 11th century (or 10th century - Aland). Scrivener labelled it by 902^{e}. The manuscript is lacunose.

== Description ==
The codex contains the text of the four Gospels on 272 parchment leaves (19.6 cm by 16.6 cm), with some Lacunae (Matthew 1:1-27:58; Luke 1:1-2:16; John 1:1-14). The text is written in one column per page, 17 lines per page in minuscule letters.

The text is divided according to the κεφαλαια (chapters), and smaller the Ammonian Sections. The numbers of the κεφαλαια are given at the margin, with their τιτλοι (titles) at the top in red. The Ammonian sections were given at the margin, with a references to the Eusebian Canons.

The lists of the κεφαλαια precede Gospel of Mark and Gospel of Luke, the lists before Luke and John have not survived to the present day. The codex contains miniatures and decorated initial letters. The tables of the κεφαλαια (contents) and Synaxarion were added by a later hand.

== Text ==
The Greek text of the codex is a representative of the Byzantine text-type. Hermann von Soden classified it to the K^{x}. Aland placed it in Category V. According to the Claremont Profile Method it belongs to the textual family Family K^{x} in Luke 10 and Luke 20. In Luke 1 its text is defective.

The text of Luke 22:43.44 is marked by an obelus (÷) and John 5:3.4 is marked by an asterisk (※).

== History ==
The manuscript was written in Constantinople in the 10th century. The manuscript was brought to America in 1844 from Crete, by George Benton (along with Minuscule 670, and Lectionary 302). In 1913 it was presented to the General Theological Seminary in New York City.

The manuscript was added to the list of New Testament manuscripts by Scrivener and Gregory. It was examined by J. Rendel Harris.

Formerly it was part of Private Collection Ch. C. Ryrie in Dallas. It was sold at auction December 5, 2016, and now is in the collection at Dumbarton Oaks, Washington, DC.

== Gallery ==
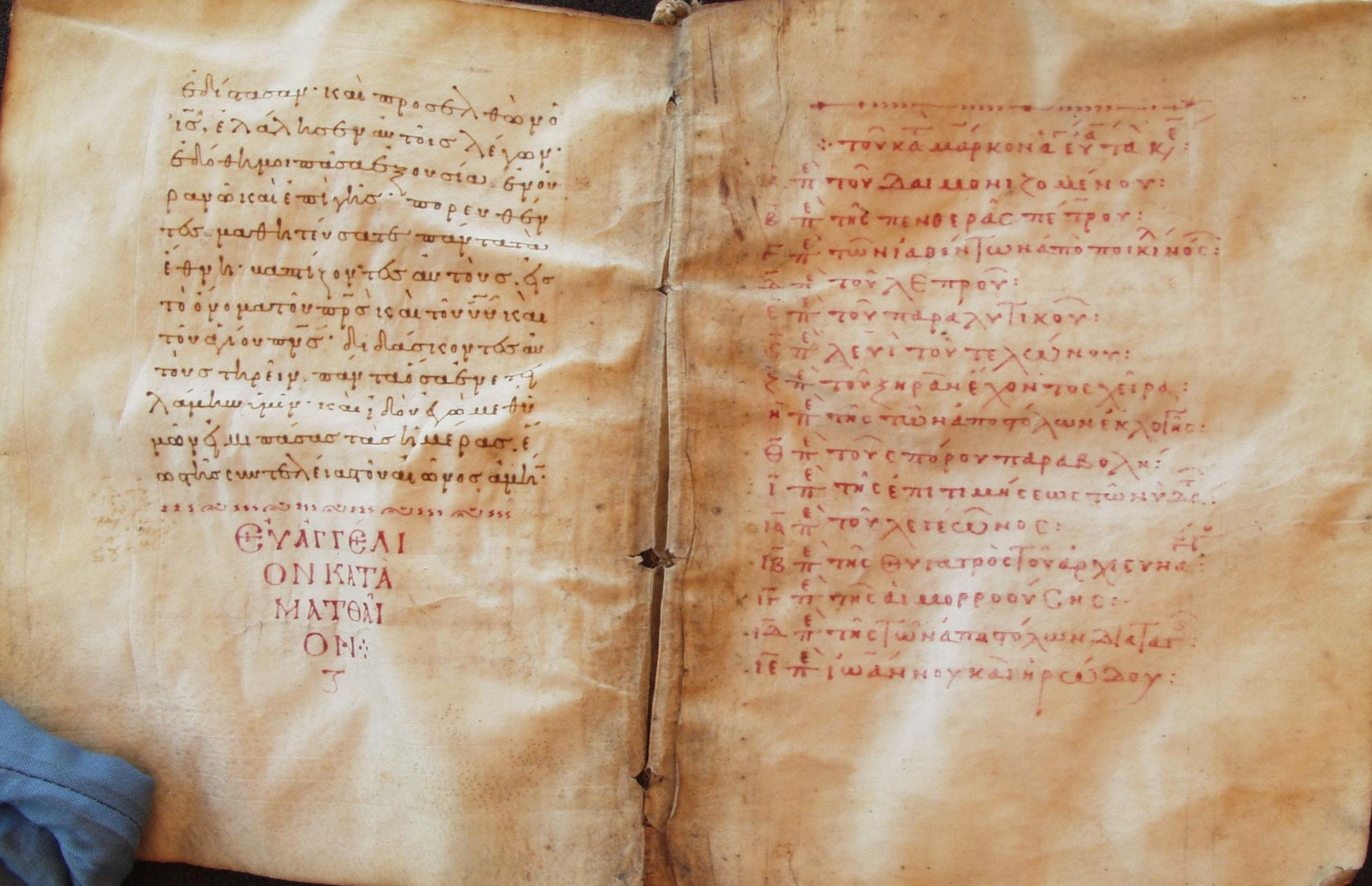
The last page of Matthew and the table of the κεφαλαια to Mark

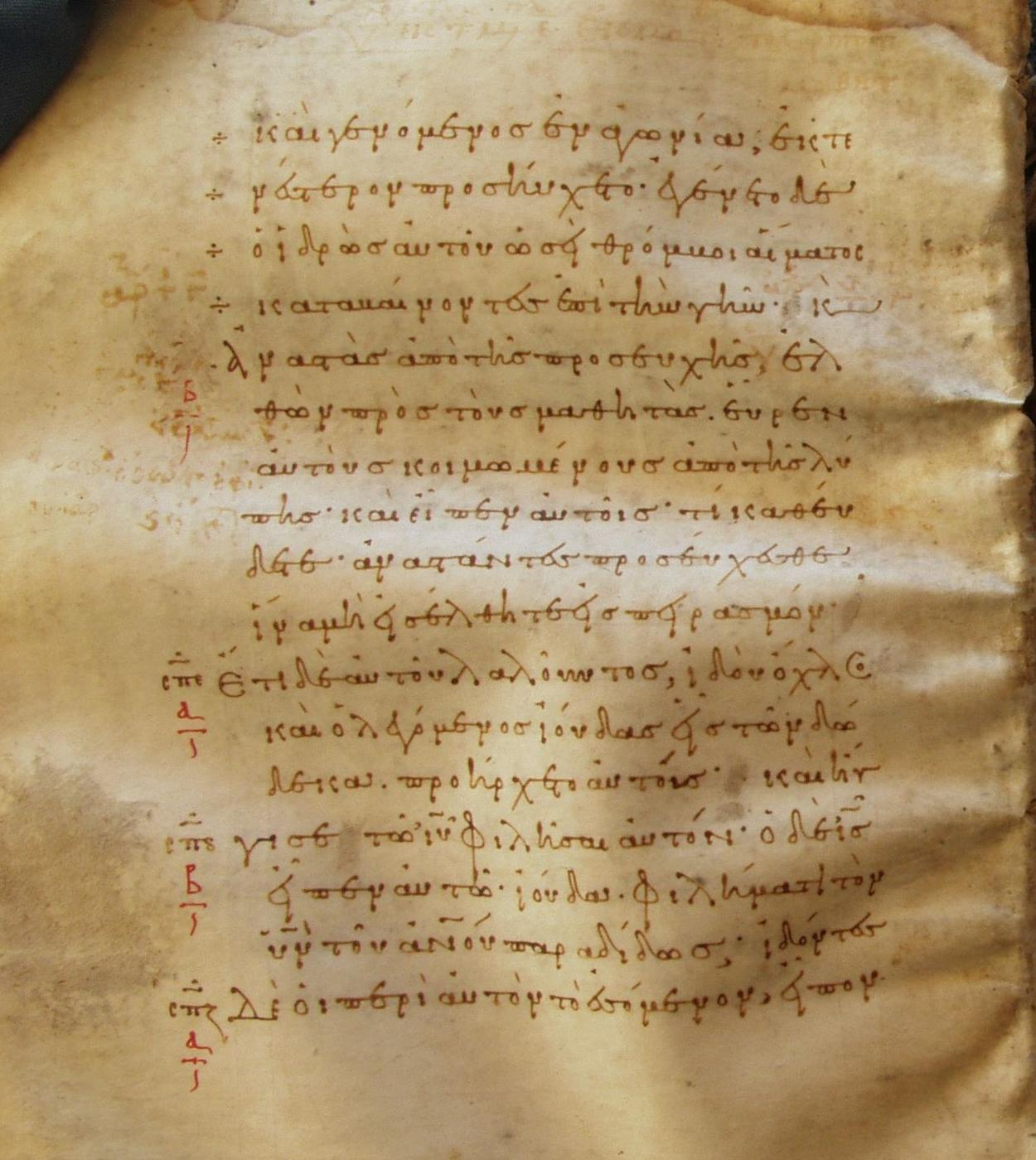
Text of Luke 22:43-44 is marked with an obelus (÷)

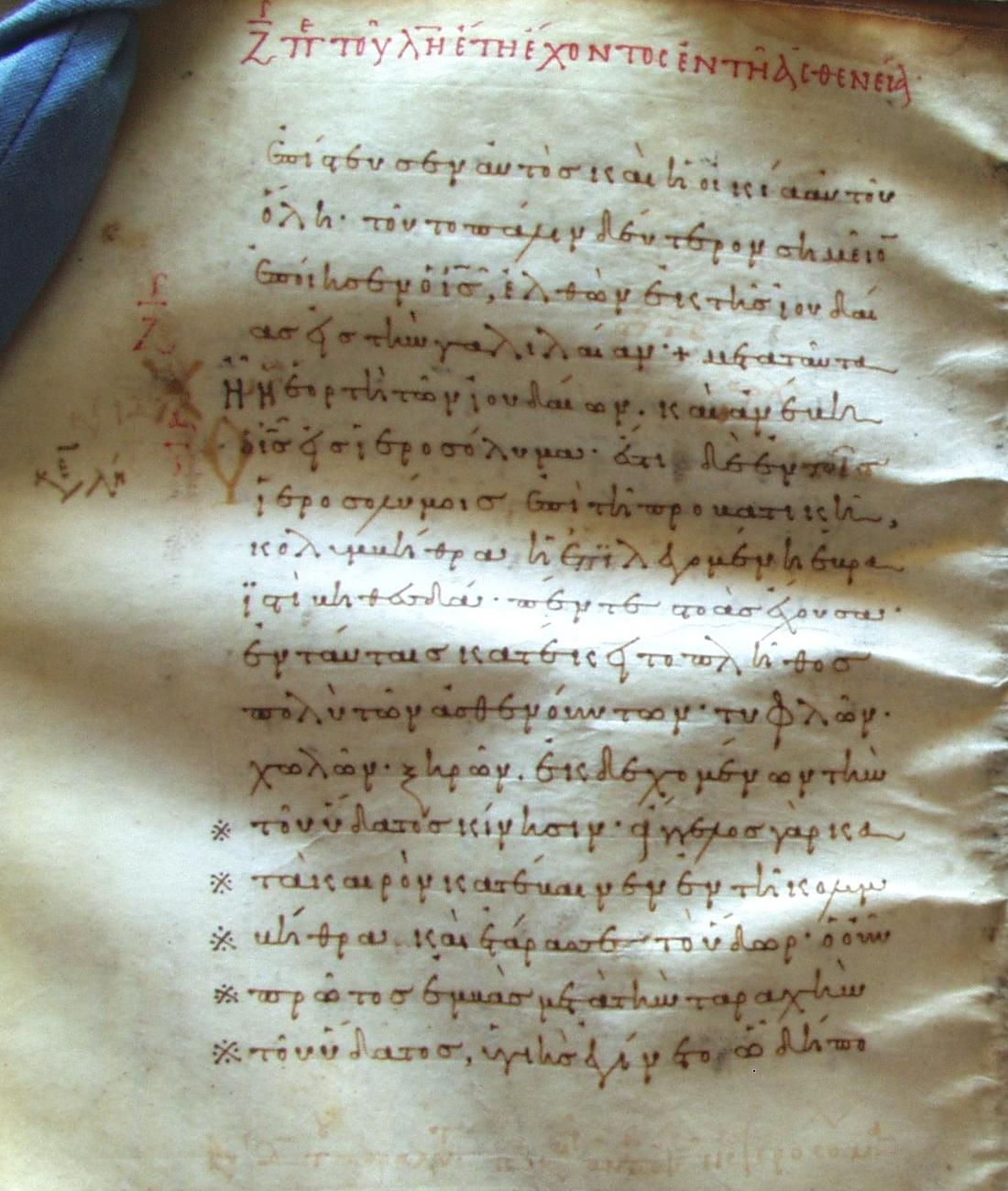
Page of the codex; τιτλος at the top (in red); text of John 5:3-4 is marked with an asterisk (※)

== See also ==
- List of New Testament minuscules
- Textual criticism
