= Minuscule 698 =

- New Testament manuscript
- Text: Gospels †
- Date: 14th century
- Script: Greek
- Found: 1858
- Now at: British Library
- Size: 17.1 cm by 13 cm
- Type: Byzantine text-type/mixed
- Category: none

Minuscule 698 is a Greek minuscule manuscript of the New Testament Gospels, written on parchment. It is designated by the siglum 698 in the Gregory-Aland numbering of New Testament manuscripts, and ε 436 in the von Soden numbering of New Testament manuscripts. Using the study of comparative writing styles (palaeography), it has been dated to the 14th century. The manuscript has several gaps. Biblical scholar Frederick H. A. Scrivener labelled it as 602^{e}.

== Description ==
The manuscript is a codex (precursor to the modern book format), containing the text of the New Testament Gospels of Mark, Luke, and John, made of 186 parchment leaves (sized 17.1 cm by 13 cm), with the entirety of the Gospel of Matthew wholly lost. The text is written in one column per page, with 19-26 lines per page.

The text is divided according to the chapters (known as κεφαλαια / kephalaia), whose numbers are given in the margin, and their titles (known as τιτλοι / titloi) at the top of the pages. There is also a division according to the smaller Ammonian Sections (237 in Mark 234, the last in 16:14). There are however no references to the Eusebian Canons (both early divisions of the Gospels into sections.). It contains the tables of contents before each Gospel (also known as κεφαλαια), lectionary markings in the margin, subscriptions at the end of each Gospel, and the Synaxarion, and Menologion.

According to Scrivener it is "rough and dirty". There are no pictures, but ornamentations in faded ink.

== Text ==
The Greek text of the codex is considered to be a representative of the Byzantine text-type. It was not placed by biblical scholar Kurt Aland in any Category of his New Testament manuscript classification system.

The text has some omissions supplied by marginal notes. According to the Claremont Profile Method (a specific analysis of textual data), it represents textual group 22a in Luke 1, Luke 10, and Luke 20.

== History ==
The earliest history of the manuscript is unknown. The manuscript was bought in 1858 from the sale of a Sir T. Gage's manuscript collection.

It was added to the list of New Testament manuscript by Scrivener (602), and biblical scholar Caspar René Gregory (698). It was examined by scholar S. T. Bloomfield, biblical scholar and clergyman Dean Burgon, and theologian William Hatch. Gregory saw the manuscript in 1883.

Scrivener and Gregory dated the manuscript to the 14th century. The manuscript is currently dated by the INTF to the 14th century. The manuscript is presently housed at the British Library (shelf number Add MS 27861) in London.

== See also ==
- List of New Testament minuscules
- Biblical manuscript
- Textual criticism
