= Gliese 625 =

Red dwarf in constellation of Draco

Observation data Epoch J2000 Equinox ICRS
- Constellation: Draco
- Right ascension: 16^{h} 25^{m} 24.62304^{s}
- Declination: +54° 18′ 14.7655″
- Apparent magnitude (V): 10.13

Characteristics
- Spectral type: M1.5V
- B−V color index: 1.591±0.027

Astrometry
Radial velocity (R_{v})	−13.37±0.14 km/s
Proper motion (μ)	RA: 432.230(19) mas/yr Dec.: −171.652(22) mas/yr
Parallax (π)	154.3503±0.0161 mas
Distance	21.131 ± 0.002 ly (6.4788 ± 0.0007 pc)
Absolute magnitude (M_{V})	11.06

Details
Mass	0.240±0.013 M_{☉}
Radius	0.255±0.034 R_{☉}
Luminosity	0.01482±0.00022 L_{☉}
Surface gravity (log g)	4.94±0.06 cgs
Temperature	3,557±9 K
Metallicity [Fe/H]	−0.401±0.005 dex
Rotation	77.8±5.5 d
Rotational velocity (v sin i)	2.2±0.7 km/s

Other designations
- GJ 625, HIP 80459, AC +54 1646, G 202-48, G 226-7, G 225-62, LSPM J1625+5418, NLTT 42804, PLX 3740.03, TYC 3878-1193-1, 2MASS J16252459+5418148

Database references
SIMBAD	data
Exoplanet Archive	data

GJ 625 (AC 54 1646-56) is a small red dwarf star with an exoplanetary companion in the northern constellation of Draco. The system is located at a distance of 21.1 light-years (6.4 parsecs) from the Sun based on parallax, but is drifting closer with a radial velocity of −13 km/s. It is too faint to be visible to the naked eye, having an apparent visual magnitude of 10.13 and an absolute magnitude of 11.06.

This is an M-type main-sequence star with a stellar classification of M1.5V. It is spinning slowly with a rotation period of roughly 78 days, and has a low magnetic activity level. The star has about a quarter of the mass and size of the Sun, and the metal content is 40% the abundances in the Sun's atmosphere. It is radiating just 1.5% of the luminosity of the Sun from its photosphere at an effective temperature of 3,557 K.

== Planetary system ==
On May 18, 2017, a planet was detected orbiting GJ 625 by the HARPS-N telescope. The planet, GJ 625 b, orbits near the inner edge of the optimistic circumstellar habitable zone of its star. Since M dwarf stars are cooler than the Sun, the planet may have potential for water despite its close proximity to its host star. The discoverers speculate it may support liquid water, depending on atmospheric conditions. Based on the habitable zone model of Kopparapu et al. 2013, the planet is not considered to be in the habitable zone as it would likely experience a runaway greenhouse effect, similar to Venus.

Since the star is considered quiescent (having a low X-ray emission and flare rate), the radio emission from the system may be auroral in nature and coming from a short-period planet. Further observations will be needed to confirm this.

The planet is roughly 3 times more massive than Earth and takes around two weeks to orbit its star, making its orbit around its star closer than the orbit of Mercury around the Sun.

The exoplanet was discovered using the HARPS-N Spectrograph.

The orbital period of GJ 625 b is 14.63 days, with a semi-major axis of approximately 0.078 AU. It has a minimum mass of 2.82 times the mass of Earth and is classified as a super-Earth. The exoplanet was discovered by Suárez Mascareño in 2017 using the radial velocity method.

The Gliese 625 planetary system
Companion (in order from star)	Mass	Semimajor axis (AU)	Orbital period (days)	Eccentricity	Inclination (°)	Radius
b	≥2.82±0.51 M_{🜨}	0.078361+0.000044 −0.000046	14.628+0.012 −0.013	0.13+0.12 −0.09	—	—
