= Minuscule 646 =

- New Testament manuscript
- Text: Gospels
- Date: 16th century
- Script: Greek
- Now at: National Library of Greece
- Size: 20 cm by 15 cm
- Type: ?
- Category: none

Minuscule 646 (in the Gregory-Aland numbering), ε 2059 (von Soden), is a Greek minuscule manuscript of the New Testament, on parchment. Palaeographically it has been assigned to the 16th century. The manuscript is lacunose. Scrivener labeled by 721^{e}.

== Description ==
The codex contains the text of the four Gospels, on 214 parchment leaves (size 20 cm by 15 cm), with only one lacuna at the end of Gospel of John (John 21:20-25). The text is written in one column per page, 22-29 lines per page, by several hands.

It contains the Eusebian tables, the tables of the κεφαλαια (chapters) are placed before every Gospel, the text is divided according to the Ammonian Sections, with a references to the Eusebian Canons.

== Text ==
Kurt Aland the Greek text of the codex did not place in any Category. It was not examined by using Claremont Profile Method. In result its textual character is still not determined.

== History ==
Scrivener dated the manuscript to the 13th century. Gregory dated it to the 14th century. Actually the manuscript is dated by the INTF to the 16th century.

Formerly the manuscript was held in Mar Saba, then in Constantinople (Hagia Taphu 436). The manuscript was added to the list of New Testament manuscripts by Scrivener (721) and Gregory (646). Gregory saw the manuscript in 1886.

The manuscript currently is housed at the National Library of Greece (Taphu 218), at Athens.

== See also ==
- List of New Testament minuscules
- Biblical manuscript
- Textual criticism
