= Minuscule 683 =

- New Testament manuscript
- Text: Gospels
- Date: 13th century
- Script: Greek
- Now at: Bodleian Library
- Size: 20 cm by 15 cm
- Type: Byzantine text-type/mixed
- Category: none

Minuscule 683 (in the Gregory-Aland numbering), ε 357 (von Soden), is a Greek minuscule manuscript of the New Testament, on parchment. Palaeographically it has been assigned to the 13th century. The manuscript has complex contents. Scrivener labelled it by 1145^{e}.

== Description ==
The codex contains the text of the four Gospels, on 206 parchment leaves (size 20 cm by 15 cm). The text is written in one column per page, 28 lines per page.

It contains Epistula ad Carpianum, the Eusebian tables, tables of the κεφαλαια (chapters), numbers of the κεφαλαια at the margin, the τιτλοι (titles) at the top, the Ammonian Sections, without a references to the Eusebian Canons, lectionary markings, incipits, Synaxarion, and Menologion.

== Text ==
The Greek text of the codex Kurt Aland did not place in any Category.

According to the Wisse's Profile Method it has mixed text in Luke and is significantly diverge form K^{x} in Luke 1. In Luke 10 and Luke 20 it represents K^{x}.

== History ==
Scrivener and Gregory dated the manuscript to the 13th century. Currently the manuscript is dated by the INTF to the 13th century.

It was previously in the private collation of the Earl of Leicester at Holkham Hall, before it was purchased by the Bodleian Library in 1956.

It was added to the list of New Testament manuscript by Scrivener (1145) and Gregory (683).

The manuscript is now housed at the Bodleian Library (Holkham Gr. 4) in Oxford.

== See also ==
- List of New Testament minuscules
- Biblical manuscript
- Textual criticism
