= Minuscule 657 =

- New Testament manuscript
- Text: Gospels †
- Date: 11th/12th century
- Script: Greek
- Now at: Berlin State Library
- Size: 12 cm by 9 cm
- Type: Byzantine text-type
- Category: V

Minuscule 657 (in the Gregory-Aland numbering), ε 180 (von Soden), is a Greek minuscule manuscript of the New Testament, on parchment. Palaeographically it has been assigned to the 11th or 12th century. The manuscript is lacunose. Scrivener labelled it by 876^{e}.

== Description ==
The codex contains the text of the New Testament, on 296 parchment leaves (size 12 cm by 9 cm) with some lacunae (Matthew 1:1-9, Mark 1:1-10, John 8:7-21). The text is written in one column per page, 21-22 lines per page, in very small letters.

The text is divided according to the κεφαλαια (chapters), which numbers are given at the margin, with their τιτλοι (titles) at the top. The text of the four Gospels is also divided according to the Ammonian Sections (in Mark 234 Sections – the last Section in 16:9), with references to the Eusebian Canons (written below Ammonian Section numbers).

It contains the Epistula ad Carpianum, lists of the κεφαλαια (tables of contents) before each book. It contains liturgical books with hagiographies (Synaxarion and Menologion) at the end of the codex, and pictures of the Evangelists are placed before each Gospel.

== Text ==
The Greek text of the codex is a representative of the Byzantine text-type. Hermann von Soden classified it as K^{x}. Kurt Aland placed it in Category V. According to the Wisse's Profile Method it belongs to mixed Byzantine text in Luke 1 (fragmentary), to the Πa in Luke 10 (weak), and to the K^{x} in Luke 20.

== History ==
C. R. Gregory dated it to the 11th century. Currently the manuscript is dated by the INTF to the 11th or 12th century.

The manuscript was added to the list of New Testament manuscripts by F. H. A. Scrivener. Gregory saw it in 1887.

Currently the manuscript is housed at the Berlin State Library (Graec. octavo 12), in Berlin.

== See also ==
- List of New Testament minuscules
- Biblical manuscript
- Textual criticism
