= Ducha-class tug =

Chinese naval auxiliary ship

History

People's Republic of China
- Status: Active

General characteristics
- Class & type: Ducha class
- Type: Tugboat
- Length: 30 m (98 ft 5 in)
- Sensors & processing systems: Navigation radar
- Electronic warfare & decoys: None
- Armament: Unarmed
- Armour: None
- Aircraft carried: None
- Aviation facilities: None

The Ducha-class large harbor tug (YTB) is a very little known naval auxiliary ship/tugboat currently in service with the People's Liberation Army Navy (PLAN). The exact type still remains unknown, but it has received NATO reporting name Ducha class. More than a dozen of this type have been confirmed in active service as of early-2020s, making it one of the most numerous class of tugs in Chinese service. The Ducha class is a design of single deck with three levels of superstructures, with the top level retracted backward from the edge of the bottom two levels.

The Ducha-class tugs in PLAN service are designated by a combination of two Chinese characters followed by three-digit number. The second Chinese character is Tuo (拖), meaning tug in Chinese, because these ships are classified as tugboats. The first Chinese character denotes which fleet the ship is service with, with East (Dong, 东) for East Sea Fleet, North (Bei, 北) for North Sea Fleet, and South (Nan, 南) for South Sea Fleet. However, the pennant numbers are subject to change due to changes of Chinese naval ships naming convention, or when units are transferred to different fleets. Specification:

- Length: 30 meter

Type	NATO designation	Pennant No.	Name (English)	Name (Han 中文)	Commissioned	Displacement	Fleet	Status
Ducha class large harbor tug (YTB)	Ducha class	Bei-Tuo 624	North Tug 624	北拖 624	?	? t	North Sea Fleet	Active
Ducha class large harbor tug (YTB)	Ducha class	Bei-Tuo 625	North Tug 625	北拖 625	?	? t	North Sea Fleet	Active
Ducha class large harbor tug (YTB)	Ducha class	Bei-Tuo 626	North Tug 626	北拖 626	?	? t	North Sea Fleet	Active
Ducha class large harbor tug (YTB)	Ducha class	Bei-Tuo 627	North Tug 627	北拖 627	?	? t	North Sea Fleet	Active
Ducha class large harbor tug (YTB)	Ducha class	Bei-Tuo 629	North Tug 629	北拖 629	?	? t	North Sea Fleet	Active
Ducha class large harbor tug (YTB)	Ducha class	Bei-Tuo 718	North Tug 718	北拖 718	?	? t	North Sea Fleet	Active
Ducha class large harbor tug (YTB)	Ducha class	Dong-Tuo 871	East Tug 871	东拖 871	?	? t	East Sea Fleet	Active
Ducha class large harbor tug (YTB)	Ducha class	Dong-Tuo 872	East Tug 872	东拖 872	?	? t	East Sea Fleet	Active
Ducha class large harbor tug (YTB)	Ducha class	Dong-Tuo 873	East Tug 873	东拖 873	?	? t	East Sea Fleet	Active
Ducha class large harbor tug (YTB)	Ducha class	Nan-Tuo 169	South Tug 169	南拖 169	?	? t	South Sea Fleet	Active
Ducha class large harbor tug (YTB)	Ducha class	Nan-Tuo 170	South Tug 170	南拖 170	?	? t	South Sea Fleet	Active
Ducha class large harbor tug (YTB)	Ducha class	Nan-Tuo 173	South Tug 173	南拖 173	?	? t	South Sea Fleet	Active
Ducha class large harbor tug (YTB)	Ducha class	Nan-Tuo 178	South Tug 178	南拖 178	?	? t	South Sea Fleet	Active
Ducha class large harbor tug (YTB)	Ducha class	Nan-Tuo 179	South Tug 179	南拖 179	?	? t	South Sea Fleet	Active
