= Minuscule 640 =

- New Testament manuscript
- Text: Epistle of James 1:1-23
- Date: 11th century
- Script: Greek
- Now at: British Library
- Size: 24.3 cm by 19.6 cm
- Type: Byzantine text-type
- Category: V
- Hand: very minute
- Note: wonderful beauty

Minuscule 640 (in the Gregory-Aland numbering), Ο^{πρ 262} (von Soden), is a Greek minuscule manuscript of the New Testament, on parchment. Palaeographically to the 11th century. The manuscript is very fragmentary. Scrivener labeled it by 230^{a}, Gregory by 203^{a}.

== Description ==
The codex contains the text of the Epistle of James 1:1-23 on 2 parchment leaves (size 24.3 cm by 19.6 cm). The text is written in one column per page, 17 lines per page for biblical text, and 37-45 lines per page for a commentary. The manuscript is of wonderful beauty.

It contains the illuminated head-pieces, the κεφαλαια at the top of the pages, with a commentary on three sides of the text in a very minute hand.

== Text ==
The Greek text of the codex is a representative of the Byzantine text-type. Kurt Aland placed it in Category V.

== History ==
The manuscript is dated by the INTF to the 11th century.

The manuscript was presented by Harris from Alexandria to the British Museum. The manuscript was added to the list of New Testament manuscripts by Scrivener (230^{a}) and Gregory (203^{a}). Gregory saw the manuscript in 1883. In 1908 Gregory gave the number 640 to it.

The manuscript currently is housed at the British Library (Add MS 19392A).

== See also ==
- List of New Testament minuscules
- Biblical manuscript
- Textual criticism
- Minuscule 639
- Minuscule 641
