= Minuscule 651 =

- New Testament manuscript
- Text: Gospels
- Date: 11th century
- Script: Greek
- Now at: Dessau
- Size: 19.5 cm by 15 cm
- Type: Byzantine text-type
- Category: V

Minuscule 651 (in the Gregory-Aland numbering), ε 1187 (von Soden), is a Greek minuscule manuscript of the New Testament, on parchment. Palaeographically it has been assigned to the 11th century. The manuscript has complex contents. Scrivener labelled it by 874^{e}.

== Description ==
The codex contains the text of the four Gospels, on 190 parchment leaves (size 19.5 cm by 15 cm). The text is written in one column per page, 25 lines per page.

It contains Prolegomena, the tables of the κεφαλαια (tables of contents) are placed before every Gospel, the numbered κεφαλαια and their τιτλοι at the top; the Ammonian Sections (Matthew 355 has sections; Mark 234 Sections (the last in 16:9); Luke 342 sections; John 233 sections) are given, but not the references to the Eusebian Canons; it has lectionary markings, incipits, Synaxarion, and Menologion.

Some corrections were made by a later hand on the margin.

== Text ==
The Greek text of the codex is a representative of the Byzantine text-type. Hermann von Soden classified it as a member of the textual family K^{x}. Kurt Aland placed it in Category V. According to the Wisse's Profile Method it represents textual group M651.

In Gospel of John 8:9 it has unique textual variant οι δε αναγινωσκοντες instead of οι δε ακουσαντες (as minuscule 725).

== History ==
Gregory dated the manuscript to the 11th or 12th century. Currently the manuscript is dated by the INTF to the 11th century.

C. R. Gregory saw the manuscript in 1889.

The manuscript currently is housed at the Anhalt. Landesbücherei, s. n., at Dessau.

== See also ==
- List of New Testament minuscules
- Biblical manuscript
- Textual criticism
