= Minuscule 662 =

- New Testament manuscript
- Text: Gospels
- Date: 12th century
- Script: Greek
- Now at: National Gallery of Victoria
- Size: 24.5 cm by 17.2 cm
- Type: Byzantine text-type
- Category: V

Minuscule 662 (in the Gregory-Aland numbering), ε 298 (von Soden), is a Greek minuscule manuscript of the New Testament, on parchment. Palaeographically it has been assigned to the 12th century. The manuscript is lacunose. Scrivener labelled it by 632^{e}.

== Description ==
The codex contains the text of the four Gospels, on 254 parchment leaves (size 24.5 cm by 17.2 cm), with only one lacuna (Luke 24:48-52). The text is written in one column per page, 22 lines per page, in very small letters.

It contains Epistula ad Carpianum, the Eusebian tables, lists of the κεφαλαια (only to Mark), numbers of the κεφαλαια (chapters) at the margin, the τιτλοι (titles) at the top, Ammonian Sections (Mark 241 - 16:20), Eusebian Canons (in gold) in the same line, and pictures. It is superbly illuminated.

== Text ==
The Greek text of the codex is a representative of the Byzantine text-type. Kurt Aland placed it in Category V.

According to the Claremont Profile Method it belongs to the textual cluster Cl 121.

The Lection of Saint Pelagia (John 8:3-11) is obelized.

== History ==
F. H. A. Scrivener and C. R. Gregory dated the manuscript to the 12th century. Currently the manuscript is dated by the INTF to the 12th century.

The manuscript once belonged to Hamilton. It was bought by Butler in 1889.

The manuscript was added to the list of New Testament manuscripts by Scrivener. Gregory saw it in 1887.

Currently the manuscript is housed at the Gallery of Victoria (Ms. 710/5), in Melbourne.

== See also ==
- List of New Testament minuscules
- Biblical manuscript
- Textual criticism
