= Minuscule 671 =

- New Testament manuscript
- Text: Gospels †
- Date: 12th century
- Script: Greek
- Now at: Ashburnham
- Size: 19.5 cm by 15.2 cm
- Type: ?
- Category: none

Minuscule 671 (in the Gregory-Aland numbering), ε 1283 (von Soden), is a Greek minuscule manuscript of the New Testament, on parchment. Palaeographically it has been assigned to the 12th century. The manuscript is very lacunose. Scrivener labelled it by 544^{e}.

== Description ==
The codex contains the text of the four Gospels, on 104 parchment leaves (size 19.5 cm by 15.2 cm), arranged in quarto, with numerous lacunae. The text is written in one column per page, 18-20 lines per page. It was written by several hands.

The tables of the κεφαλαια are placed before every Gospel. The text is divided according to the κεφαλαια (chapters), which numbers are given at the left margin, and their τιτλοι (titles) at the top of the pages. There is also a division with a references to the Eusebian Canons (partially). There is no heading to the Gospel of Luke, but a blank space is left, so that perhaps the manuscript was never finished. The manuscript has a large number of unfoliated leaves.

== Text ==
The Greek text of the codex is still not determined. Kurt Aland did not examine it by using his method of 1000 readings, and he did not place it in any Category. It was also not examined by using the Claremont Profile Method.

According to Gregory it contains some Western readings. Its text is probably mixed.

== History ==
Scrivener dated the manuscript to the 13th century, Gregory dated it to the 12th or 13th century. Currently the manuscript is dated by the INTF to the 12th century.

The manuscript was brought from Greece to Britain by the Earl of Aberdeen. Formerly it belonged to the Ashburnham (204). It was added to the list of New Testament manuscripts by Scrivener and Gregory. Gregory saw it in 1883. Currently the manuscript is held in a private collection. Officially its owner is unknown.

== See also ==
- List of New Testament minuscules
- Biblical manuscript
- Textual criticism
