= Epistle to Philemon =

Book of the New Testament

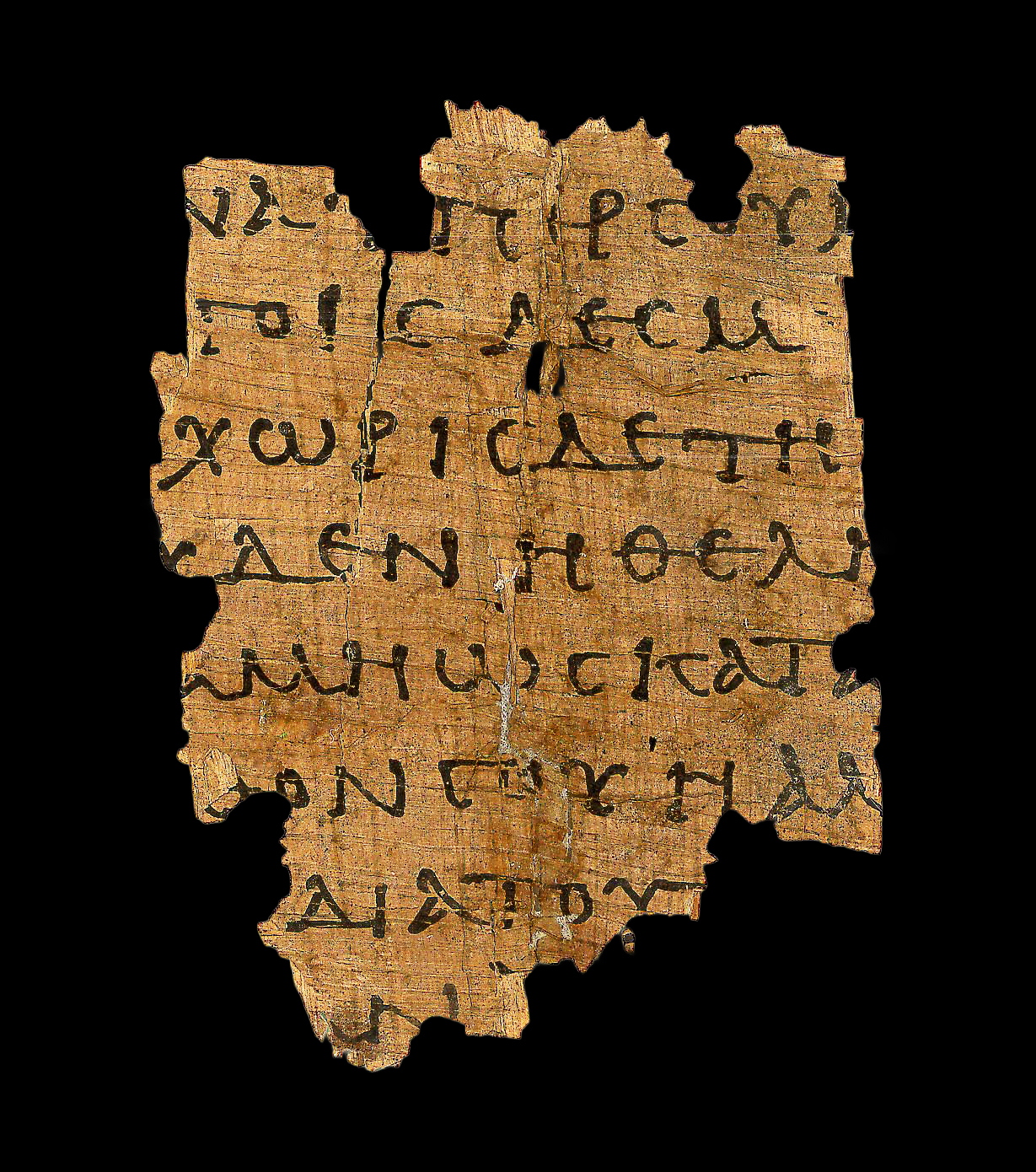
Philemon 13–15 on Papyrus 87 (recto; c. AD 250)

The Epistle to Philemon (Note: The book is sometimes called the Letter of Paul to Philemon, or simply Philemon. It is most commonly abbreviated as "Philem.") is a Pauline epistle of the New Testament of the Christian Bible. It is a prison letter, authored by Paul the Apostle (the opening verse also mentions Timothy), to Philemon, a leader in the Colossian church. Paul does not identify himself as an apostle with authority, but as "a prisoner of Jesus Christ", calling Timothy "our brother", and addressing Philemon as "fellow labourer" and "brother" (Philemon 1:1; 1:7; 1:20). Onesimus, a slave who had escaped from his master Philemon, was returning with this epistle wherein Paul asked Philemon to receive him as a "brother beloved" (Philemon 1:9–17). The letter appeals on behalf of Onesimus, who subsequently became a Christian through Paul. Paul requests that Philemon receive Onesimus not as a slave but as a beloved brother in Christ, offering to repay any debt Onesimus owes.

Philemon was a wealthy Christian, possibly a bishop of the church that met in his home (Philemon 1:1–2) in Colossae. This letter is now generally regarded as one of the undisputed works of Paul. It is the shortest of Paul's extant letters, consisting of only 335 words in the Greek text.

The epistle emphasizes reconciliation, forgiveness, and Christian fellowship, addressing themes of slavery, freedom, and ethical conduct within the Roman social context. While it does not explicitly condemn slavery, it reframes master-servant relationships in spiritual terms, highlighting the moral and social transformation encouraged within early Christian communities.

== Composition ==
The Epistle to Philemon was composed around AD 57–62 by Paul while in prison at Caesarea Maritima (early date) or from Rome (later date). Scholars who do not dispute Pauline authorship of Colossians often hold that both were composed together.

=== Authorship ===
The Epistle to Philemon is attributed to the apostle Paul, and this attribution has rarely been questioned by scholars. Along with six others, it is numbered among the "undisputed letters", which are widely considered to be authentically Pauline. The main challenge to the letter's authenticity came from a group of German scholars in the nineteenth century known as the Tübingen School. Their leader, Ferdinand Christian Baur, only accepted four New Testament epistles as genuinely written by Paul: Romans, 1 and 2 Corinthians, and Galatians. Commenting on Philemon, Baur described the subject matter as "so very singular as to arouse our suspicions", and concluded that it is perhaps a "Christian romance serving to convey a genuine Christian idea". This view is now largely considered to be outdated and finds no support in modern scholarship.

The opening verse of the salutation also names Timothy alongside Paul. This, however, does not mean that Timothy was the epistle's co-author. Rather, Paul regularly mentions others in the address if they have a particular connection with the recipient. In this case, Timothy may have encountered Philemon while accompanying Paul in his work in Ephesus.

=== Occasion ===
According to the most common interpretation, Paul wrote this letter on behalf of Onesimus, a runaway slave who had wronged his owner Philemon. A slave running away was in and of itself illegal. It is often assumed that Onesimus had fled after stealing money, as Paul states in verse 18 that if Onesimus owes anything, Philemon should charge this to Paul's account. Sometime after leaving, Onesimus came into contact with Paul, although again the details are unclear. He may have been arrested and imprisoned alongside Paul. Alternatively, he may have previously heard Paul's name (as his owner was a Christian) and so travelled to him for help. After meeting Paul, Onesimus became a Christian believer. An affection grew between them, and Paul would have been glad to keep Onesimus with him. However, he considered it better to send him back to Philemon with an accompanying letter, which aimed to effect reconciliation between them as Christian brothers. The preservation of the letter suggests that Paul's request was granted.

Onesimus' status as a fugitive slave was challenged by Allen Dwight Callahan in an article published in the Harvard Theological Review and in a later commentary. Callahan argues that, beyond verse 16, "nothing in the text conclusively indicates that Onesimus was ever the chattel of the letter's chief addressee. Moreover, the expectations fostered by the traditional fugitive slave hypothesis go unrealized in the letter. Modern commentators, even those committed to the prevailing interpretation, have tacitly admitted as much." Callahan argues that the earliest commentators on this work – the homily of Origen and the Anti-Marcion Preface – are silent about Onesimus' possible servile status, and traces the origins of this interpretation to John Chrysostom, who proposed it in his Homiliae in epistolam ad Philemonem, during his ministry in Antioch, circa 386–398. In place of the traditional interpretation, Callahan suggests that Onesimus and Philemon are brothers both by blood and religion, but who have become estranged, and the intent of this letter was to reconcile the two men. Ben Witherington III has challenged Callahan's interpretation as a misreading of Paul's rhetoric. Further, Margaret M. Mitchell has demonstrated that a number of writers before Chrysostom either argue or assume that Onesimus was a runaway slave, including Athanasius, Basil of Caesarea and Ambrosiaster.

However, from the standpoint of context, vs.12–16 do make it rather clear that he was a runaway slave. In v.14 Paul states he did not want to do anything without Philemon's consent. Since Paul could have ordered or commanded Philemon to do it, but the fact that he desired his consent stands out. Also, Paul could have just kept Onesimus there, and Onesimus himself could have stayed there. Philemon would have had the right to hold his runaway slave accountable not just from a financial or social standpoint, but a legal standpoint. Onesimus, upon his return, could have legally been made a prisoner of Rome. Vs15–16 make it clear that Paul was asking Philemon to receive him back "forever" and "no longer as a slave" but as a "beloved brother." Paul actually writes that it was perhaps God's purpose that Onesimus initially ran away for the purpose of becoming a Christian and then return as a fellow Christian. Paul calls him "his son" (v.10) whom he "begot while still in chains." The message to Philemon is to accept Onesimus back as the "son" of a "prisoner of Jesus Christ." It appears that both Paul and Onesimus desired to do the right thing out of respect for Philemon, but also expecting Philemon to do the right thing as someone who had been graciously forgiven and received by the Lord....as a fellow "prisoner of Christ Jesus."

The only extant information about Onesimus apart from this letter is found in Paul's epistle to the Colossians 4:7–9, where Onesimus is called "a faithful and beloved brother":

All my state shall Tychicus declare unto you, who is a beloved brother, and a faithful minister and fellow servant in the Lord: ^{8} Whom I have sent unto you for the same purpose, that he might know your estate, and comfort your hearts; ^{9} With Onesimus, a faithful and beloved brother, who is one of you. They shall make known unto you all things which are done here.

=== Recipient ===
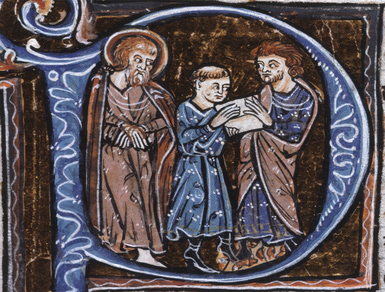
Decorated initial with Paul, Onesimus (delivering letter) and Philemon

The letter is addressed to Philemon, Apphia and Archippus, and the church in Philemon's house. Philemon is described as a "fellow worker" of Paul. It is generally assumed that he lived in Colossae; in the letter to the Colossians, Onesimus (the slave who fled from Philemon) and Archippus (whom Paul greets in the letter to Philemon) are described as members of the church there. Philemon may have converted to Christianity through Paul's ministry, possibly in Ephesus. Apphia in the salutation is probably Philemon's wife. Her name (Greek: Ἀπφία) is possibly of Phrygian or Greek origin. Some have speculated that Archippus (Greek: Ἀρχιππος, romanized: Archippos), described by Paul as a "fellow soldier", is the son of Philemon and Apphia.

The Scottish Pastor John Knox proposed that Onesimus' owner was in fact Archippus, and the letter was addressed to him rather than Philemon. In this reconstruction, Philemon would receive the letter first and then encourage Archippus to release Onesimus so that he could work alongside Paul. This view, however, has not found widespread support. In particular, Knox's view has been challenged on the basis of the opening verses. According to O'Brien, the fact that Philemon's name is mentioned first, together with the use of the phrase "in your house" in verse 2, makes it unlikely that Archippus was the primary addressee. Knox further argued that the letter was intended to be read aloud in the Colossian church in order to put pressure on Archippus. A number of commentators, however, see this view as contradicting the tone of the letter. J. B. Lightfoot, for example, wrote: "The tact and delicacy of the Apostle's pleading for Onesimus would be nullified at one stroke by the demand for publication."

== Content ==
=== Greeting and introduction (1–3) ===
The opening salutation follows a typical pattern found in other Pauline letters. Paul first introduces himself, with a self-designation as a "prisoner of Jesus Christ," which in this case refers to a physical imprisonment. He also mentions his associate Timothy, as a valued colleague who was presumably known to the recipient. As well as addressing the letter to Philemon, Paul sends greetings to Apphia, Archippus and the church that meets in Philemon's house. Apphia is often presumed to be Philemon's wife and Archippus, a "fellow labourer", is sometimes suggested to be their son. Paul concludes his salutation with a prayerful wish for grace and peace.

=== Thanksgiving and intercession (4–7) ===
Before addressing the main topic of the letter, Paul continues with a paragraph of thanksgiving and intercession. This serves to prepare the ground for Paul's central request. He gives thanks to God for Philemon's love and faith and prays for his faith to be effective. He concludes this paragraph by describing the joy and comfort he has received from knowing how Philemon has shown love towards the Christians in Colossae.

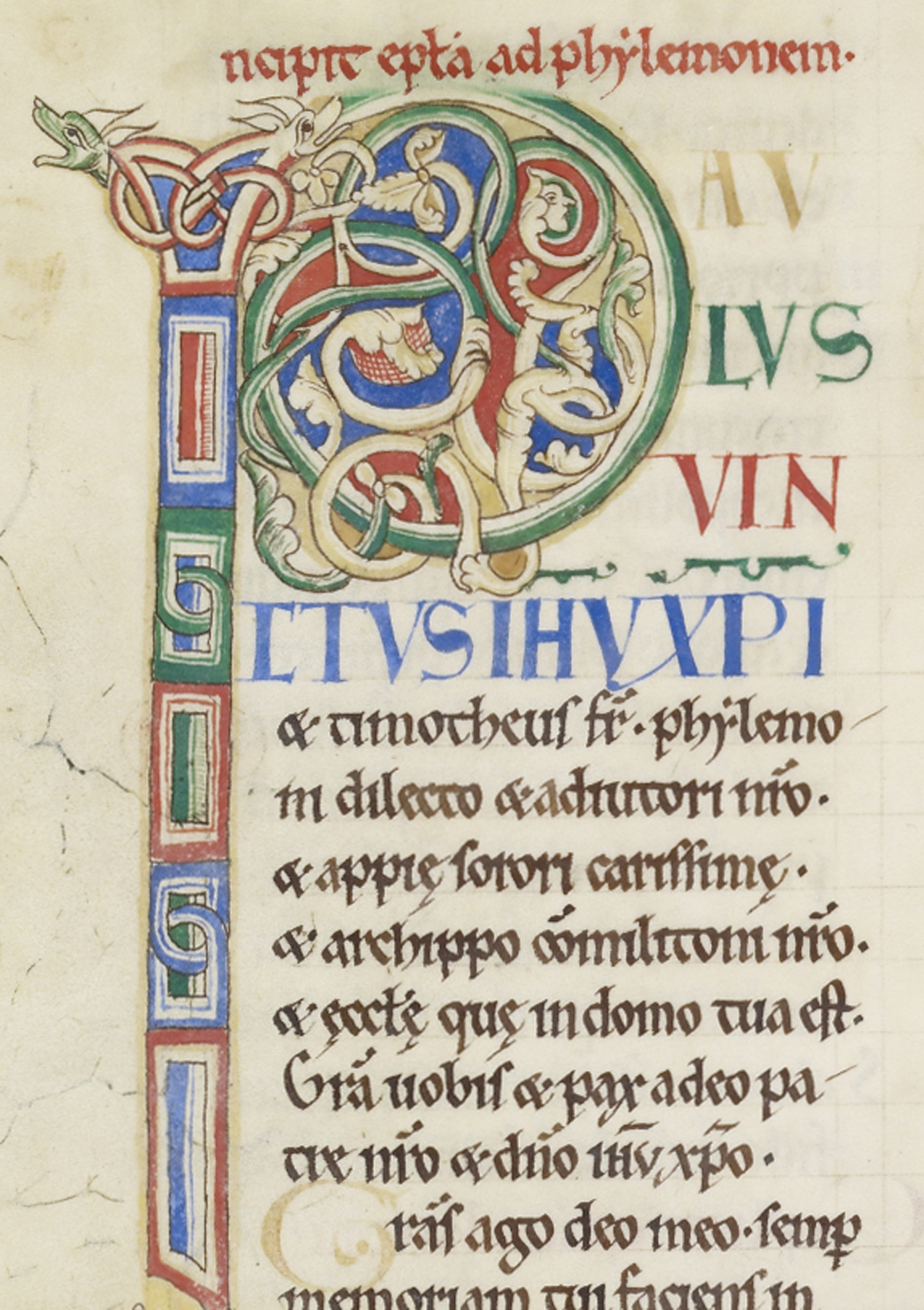
Beginning of Philemon in the Rochester Bible (12th century), starting with PAVLVS VINCTVS IHV XPI, "Paul, a prisoner of Jesus Christ…"

=== Paul's plea for Onesimus (8–20) ===
As a background to his specific plea for Onesimus, Paul clarifies his intentions and circumstances. Although he has the boldness to command Philemon to do what would be right in the circumstances, he prefers to base his appeal on his knowledge of Philemon's love and generosity. He also describes the affection he has for Onesimus and the transformation that has taken place with Onesimus's conversion to the Christian faith. Where Onesimus was "useless", now he is "useful" – a wordplay, as Onesimus means "useful". Paul indicates that he would have been glad to keep Onesimus with him, but recognised that it was right to send him back. Paul's specific request is for Philemon to welcome Onesimus as he would welcome Paul, namely as a Christian brother. He offers to pay for any debt created by Onesimus' departure and expresses his desire that Philemon might refresh his heart in Christ.

=== Conclusion and greetings (21–25) ===
In the final section of the letter, Paul describes his confidence that Philemon would do even more than he had requested, perhaps indicating his desire for Onesimus to return to work alongside him. He also mentions his wish to visit and asks Philemon to prepare a guest room. Paul sends greetings from five of his co-workers and concludes the letter with a benediction.

== Themes ==
Paul uses slavery vs. freedom language more often in his writings as a metaphor.

This letter may have provided some comfort to some slaves of the time.

Though its practice appears centrally, Paul does not share value judgments about the institution of slavery. Its influence could create pressures, as an “abolitionist would have been at the same time an insurrectionist, and the political effects of such a movement would have been unthinkable." Paul saw human institutions like slavery among many that in his apocalyptic view would soon go.

When it comes to Onesimus and his circumstance as a slave, Paul felt that Onesimus should return to Philemon but not as a slave; rather, under a bond of familial love. Paul also was not suggesting that Onesimus be punished, in spite of the fact that Roman law allowed the owner of a runaway slave nearly unlimited privileges of punishment, even execution. This is a concern of Paul and a reason he is writing to Philemon, asking that Philemon accept Onesimus back in a bond of friendship, forgiveness, and reconciliation. Paul is undermining this example of a human institution which dehumanizes people. Onesimus, like Philemon, belongs to Christ, and so "Christ, and not Philemon, has a claim on Onesimus' honor and obedience."

Verses 13–14 suggest that Paul wants Philemon to send Onesimus back to Paul (possibly freeing him for the purpose). Marshall, Travis and Paul write, "Paul hoped that it might be possible for [Onesimus] to spend some time with him as a missionary colleague... If that is not a request for Onesimus to join Paul’s circle, I do not know what more would need to be said".

== Significance ==
In order to better appreciate the Book of Philemon, it is necessary to be aware of the situation of the early Christian community in the Roman Empire; and the economic system of Classical Antiquity based on slavery. According to the Epistle to Diognetus:

For the Christians are distinguished from other men neither by country, nor language, nor the customs which they observe... They are in the flesh, but they do not live after the flesh. They pass their days on earth, but they are citizens of heaven. They obey the prescribed laws, and at the same time surpass the laws by their lives.

Pope Benedict XVI refers to this letter in his encyclical letter, Spe salvi, highlighting the power of Christianity as power of the transformation of society:

Those who, as far as their civil status is concerned, stand in relation to one an other as masters and slaves, inasmuch as they are members of the one Church have become brothers and sisters—this is how Christians addressed one another... Even if external structures remained unaltered, this changed society from within. When the Letter to the Hebrews says that Christians here on earth do not have a permanent homeland, but seek one which lies in the future (cf. Heb 11:13–16; Phil 3:20), this does not mean for one moment that they live only for the future: present society is recognized by Christians as an exile; they belong to a new society which is the goal of their common pilgrimage and which is anticipated in the course of that pilgrimage.

== See also ==
- Textual variants in the Epistle to Philemon
- Christian views on slavery
- Letter 47 (Seneca)

== Sources ==
Epistle to Philemon Pauline Epistle
| Preceded by Pastoral Epistle to Titus | New Testament; Books of the Bible | Succeeded by Epistle to the Hebrews |
