= Catholic epistles =

Seven epistles of the New Testament

The catholic epistles (also called the general epistles) are seven epistles of the New Testament. Listed in order of their appearance in the New Testament, the catholic epistles are:

Traditional epistle name	Author according to the text (NRSV)	Traditional attribution	Modern consensus	Addressee(s) according to the text (NRSV)
Epistle of James	"James, a servant of God and of the Lord Jesus Christ"	James, brother of Jesus	An unknown James	"To the twelve tribes in the Dispersion"
First Epistle of Peter	"Peter, an apostle of Jesus Christ"	Simon Peter	Maybe Simon Peter	"To the exiles of the Dispersion in Pontus, Galatia, Cappadocia, Asia and Bithynia"
Second Epistle of Peter	"Sim(e)on Peter, a servant and apostle of Jesus Christ"	Simon Peter	Not Simon Peter	To all Christians
First Epistle of John	anonymous	John, son of Zebedee	Unknown	To fellow Christians
Second Epistle of John	anonymous	John, son of Zebedee	Unknown	"To the elect lady and her children"
Third Epistle of John	anonymous	John, son of Zebedee	Unknown	"To the beloved Gaius"
Epistle of Jude	"Jude" (or "Judas"), "a servant," (Gk. slave), "of Jesus Christ and brother of James"	Jude, brother of Jesus	An unknown Jude	To all Christians

== Naming ==
The use of the word catholic in the term 'catholic epistles' has been a convention going back to the fourth century. Untied to a particular denomination, it simply meant "general" at that time. Later, the word catholic would become part of the name of the Catholic Church. To avoid the assumption that these texts are therefore specific to the Catholic Church or Catholicism, alternative terms such as "general epistles" or "general missionary epistles" are used.

In the historical context, the word catholic probably signified that the letters were addressed to the general church, and not to specific, separate congregations or persons, as with the Pauline epistles. However, 2 John and 3 John appear to contradict this view, because their addresses are respectively to the "elect lady", speculated by many to be the church itself, and to "Gaius", about whom there has been much speculation but little in the way of conclusive proof as to his identity. Some historians therefore think that the label catholic was originally applied to just 1 John, and expanded to all other non-Pauline epistles later on.

Some Protestants have termed these "Lesser Epistles". In general, with the exception of James, these writings are fairly obscure and receive less attention than the other parts of the New Testament.

== Authorship ==
Three of the seven letters are anonymous. These three have traditionally been attributed to John the Apostle, the son of Zebedee and one of the Twelve Apostles of Jesus. Consequently, these letters have been labelled the Johannine epistles, despite the fact that none of the epistles mentions any author. Most modern scholars believe the author is not John the Apostle, but there is no scholarly consensus for any particular historical figure. (See Authorship of the Johannine works.)

Two of the letters claim to have been written by Simon Peter, one of the Twelve Apostles of Jesus. Therefore, they have traditionally been called the Petrine epistles. However, most modern scholars agree the second epistle was probably not written by Peter, because it appears to have been written in the early 2nd century, long after Peter had died. Yet, opinions on the first epistle are more divided; many scholars do think this letter is authentic, although it is written in a polished Greek even better than that of Paul, which is unlikely for an illiterate Jewish fisherman, and adopts Paul's theology, which fits poorly with the tension between Paul and Peter.

In one epistle, the author only calls himself James (Ἰάκωβος Iákobos). It is not known which James this is supposed to be. There are several different traditional Christian interpretations of other New Testament texts which mention a James, brother of Jesus. However, most modern scholars tend to reject this line of reasoning, since the author himself does not indicate any familial relationship with Jesus. A similar problem presents itself with the Epistle of Jude (Ἰούδας Ioudas): the writer names himself a brother of James (ἀδελφὸς δὲ Ἰακώβου adelphos de Iakóbou), but it is not clear which James is meant. According to some Christian traditions, this is the same James as the author of the Epistle of James, himself reputedly a brother of Jesus; and so, this Jude should also be a brother of Jesus, despite the fact he does not indicate any such thing in his text.

With the exception of the Petrine epistles, both of which may be pseudepigrapha, the seven catholic epistles were added to the New Testament canon because early Church Fathers attributed the anonymous epistles to important people, and attributed the epistles written by people with the same name as important people to those important people.

== Rejection from the biblical canon ==
Acceptance of the Catholic epistles was contentious for the first few centuries of Christianity. Rejection among some Christians was first described by Origen in the early third century. Even after the epistles began to widely appear in canonical lists from the late fourth century, some groups continued to reject some or all the catholic epistles into the sixth and seventh centuries.
