= Minuscule 101 =

- New Testament manuscript
- Text: Acts, Pauline epistles
- Date: 11th century
- Script: Greek
- Now at: Saxon State Library
- Size: 30 cm by 22 cm
- Type: ?
- Category: none
- Note: marginalia

Minuscule 101 (in the Gregory-Aland numbering), O^{17} (von Soden), is a Greek minuscule manuscript of the New Testament, on parchment leaves. Palaeographically it has been assigned to the 11th century. It was formerly called Codex Uffenbachianum 3, 98^{a} and 113^{p}.

== Description ==
The codex contains the text of the Acts, Catholic epistles, and Pauline epistles on 85 leaves (size 30 cm by 22 cm) with numerous lacunae.

The text is written in two columns per page, 40 lines per page. The text of the Epistles is divided according to the κεφαλαια (chapters), whose numbers are given at the margin. It contains Prolegomena, tables of the κεφαλαια (tables of contents) before each book, a commentary, and margin notes.

According to the subscription at the end of the Epistle to the Romans, the Letter was προς Ρωμαιους εγραφη απο Κορινθου δια Φοιβης της διακονου της εν Κεγχρεαις εκκλησιας. The same subscription is found in manuscripts: 241, 460, 466, 469, 602, 603, 605, 618, 1923, 1924, 1927, 1932, followed by Textus Receptus.

Kurt Aland did not place the Greek text of the codex in any Category.

== History ==
The manuscript once belonged to Jeremias the patriarch of the Stavronikita monastery at Mount Athos. The manuscript in 1788 belonged to Matthaei and was bought for the Library in Dresden. It once belonged to Zacharias Conrad von Uffenbach. It was examined by Matthaei, Scholz, and Tregelles. C. R. Gregory saw it in 1880.

Formerly it was labelled by 98^{a} and 113^{p}. In 1908 Gregory gave it the number 101.

It is currently housed at the Saxon State and University Library Dresden (SLUB) (Mscr. Dresd. A. 104), at Dresden. However, it cannot be used in its present state due to water damage.

== See also ==
- List of New Testament minuscules
- Biblical manuscript
- Textual criticism
