= Minuscule 223 =

- New Testament manuscript
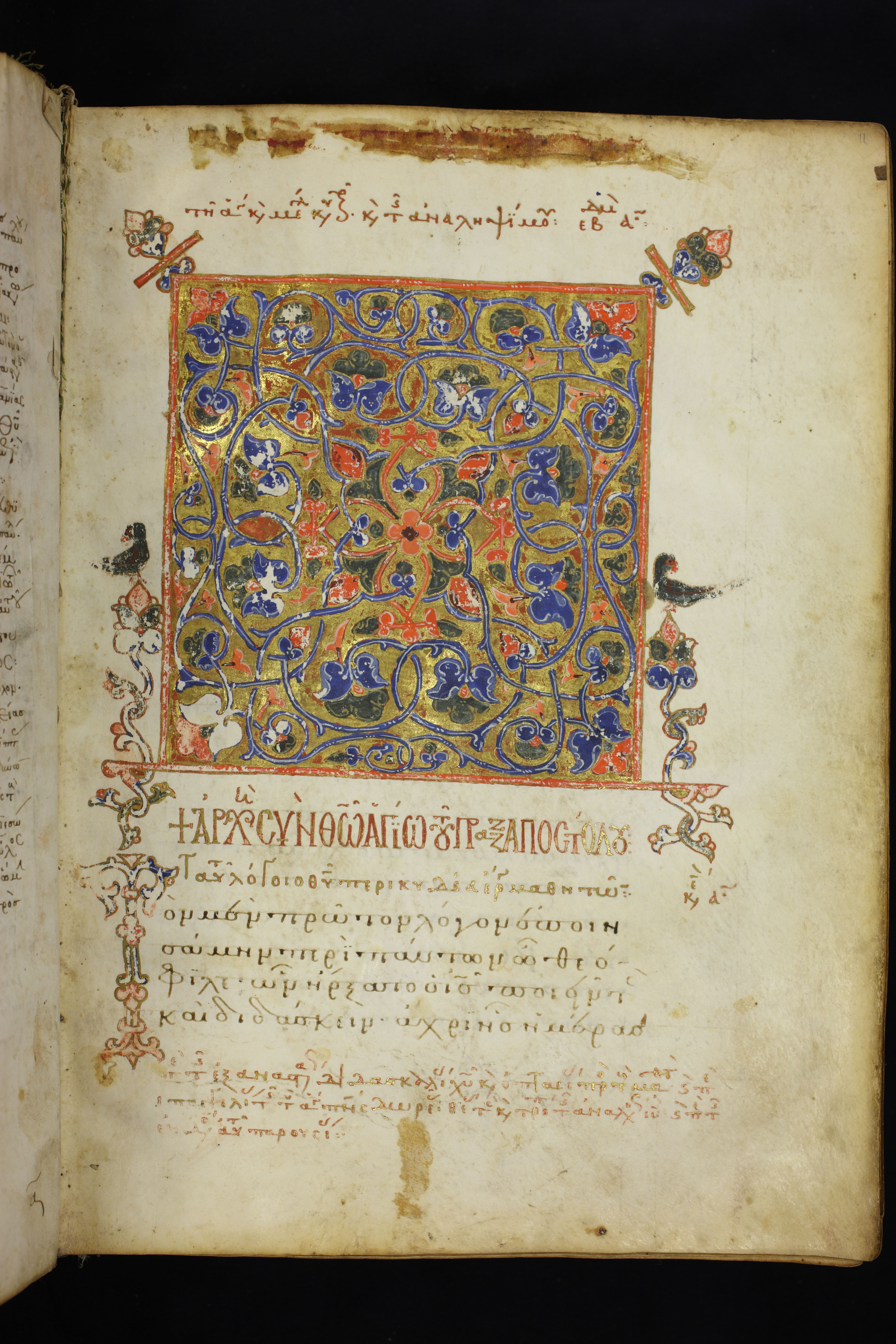
- The beginning of the Acts
- Text: Acts, Pauline epistles
- Date: 14th-century
- Script: Greek
- Now at: University of Michigan Library
- Size: 28.2 cm by 21.3 cm
- Type: Byzantine
- Category: V

Minuscule 223 (in the Gregory-Aland numbering), α 263 (Von Soden numbering), is a Greek minuscule manuscript of the New Testament, on parchment. Palaeographically it has been assigned to the 14th-century. Formerly it was labeled by 223^{a} and 277^{p}. Scrivener labelled it by 220^{a} and 264^{p}.

== Description ==
The codex contains the text of the Acts, Pauline, and Catholic epistles on 376 parchment leaves (size 28.2 cm by 21.3 cm), with some lacunae (first leaves in 2 Corinthians with 1:1-3, Ephesians with 1:1-4, and Hebrews with 1:1-6). The text is written in one column per page, 22-23 lines per page, on fine vellum with broad margins. Titles in gold, initial letters ornamented, brilliantly illuminated.

The text is divided according to the κεφαλαια (chapters), whose numbers are given at the margin, and the τιτλοι (titles of chapters) at the top of the pages.

It contains double prolegomena, Journeys and death of Paul, (Note: As in codices: 102, 206, 216, 256, 468, 614, 665, 909, 912) tables of the κεφαλαια (to the Acts), lectionary markings at the margin, liturgical books with hagiographies (Synaxarion, Menologion), and subscriptions at the end of each biblical book. The illuminations are given before each book.

== Text ==
The Greek text of the codex is a representative of the Byzantine text-type. Aland placed it in Category V.

== History ==
The manuscript was written by Antonius, a monk. According to the colophon the manuscript was written by Antonios of Malaka in 1244. Dating of the manuscript is problematic, possibly the colophon was not inserted by original scribe. It was examined by Scrivener and Gregory (1883).

Formerly it was labeled by 223^{a} and 277^{p}. In 1908 C. R. Gregory gave number 223 for it.

It is currently housed at the University of Michigan Library (Ms. 34), at Ann Arbor, Michigan.

== See also ==
- List of New Testament minuscules
- Biblical manuscript
- Textual criticism
