= Minuscule 460 =

- New Testament manuscript
- Text: Acts of the Apostles, Catholic epistles, Pauline epistles
- Date: 13th century
- Script: Greek-Latin-Arabic
- Now at: Marcian Library
- Size: 28 cm by 23.5 cm
- Hand: beautifully written

Minuscule 460 (in the Gregory-Aland numbering), α 397 (in the Soden numbering), is a Greek-Latin-Arabic minuscule manuscript of the New Testament, on parchment. The manuscript is lacunose. Palaeographically it has been assigned to the 13th century. Formerly it was labelled by 96^{a} and 109^{p}.

== Description ==
The codex contains the text of the Acts of the Apostles, Catholic epistles, and Pauline epistles on 302 parchment leaves (28 cm by 23.5 cm) with some lacunae (Acts 1:1-12; 25:21-26:18; Philemon). It is written in three columns per page, in 28 lines per page.

The order of books: Acts, Catholic epistles, and Pauline epistles (Hebrews placed before 1 Timothy). The manuscript is trilingual: Greek, Latin, and Arabic.

According to the subscription at the end of the Epistle to the Romans, the Letter was προς Ρωμαιους εγραφη απο Κορινθου δια Φοιβης της διακονου της εν Κεγχρεαις εκκλησιας. The same subscription appears in manuscripts: 101, 241, 466, 469, 602, 603, 605, 618, 1923, 1924, 1927, 1932, followed by Textus Receptus.

== Text ==
Kurt Aland did not place the Greek text of the codex in any Category.

The text of Romans 16:25-27 is following 14:23, as in Codex Angelicus Codex Athous Lavrensis, 0209, Minuscule 181 326 330 451 614 1241 1877 1881 1984 1985 2492 2495.

In Titus 1:9 it has additional reading "μη χειροτονειν διγαμους μηδε διακονους αυτους ποιειν μηδε γυναικας εχειν εκ διγαμιας, μηδε προσερχεσθωσαν εν τω θυσιαστηριω λειτουργειν το θειον. τους αρχοντας τους αδικοκριτας και αρπαγας και ψευστας και ανελεημονας ελεγχε ως θεου διακονος".

In Titus 1:11 it has additional reading "τα τεκνα οι τους ιδιους γονεις υβριζοντες η τυπτοντες επιστομιζε και ελεγχε και νουθετει ως πατηρ τεκνα".

In Hebrews 7:1 it has additional reading "οτε εδιωξεν τους αλλοφυλους και εξειλατο Λωτ μετα πασης αιχμαλωσιας". The reading of the codex is not supported by any manuscript.

In 1 John 5:7-8, (Folio 115v) the Greek column omits the Heavenly Witnesses, but the Latin column maintains the verse after the earthly witnesses (v. 8), and the ending of v. 6 in the Latin reads: Sps est veritas (Line 11). In the Arabic column, on earth is added (Line 13), being part of the verse's addition.

== History ==
Gregory dated it to the 13th or 14th century. Scrivener dated it to the 11th century. Currently it is dated by the INTF to the 13th century.

The manuscript came from the monastery of St. Micheal de Troyna in Sicily. The manuscript was examined by Birch, Scholz. It was partially collated by G. F. Rinck. According to Scrivener it is an important copy, which text often resembling Minuscule 618, but according to C. R. Gregory its text is "schlecht" (poor). Gregory saw it in 1886.

It was added to the list of New Testament manuscripts by Scholz. Formerly it was labelled by 96^{a} and 109^{p}. In 1908 Gregory gave the number 460 to it.

It is currently housed at the Biblioteca Marciana (Gr. Z. 11 (379)) in Venice.

== See also ==
- List of New Testament minuscules
- Biblical manuscript
- Textual criticism
