= Epistle to the Romans =

Book of the New Testament

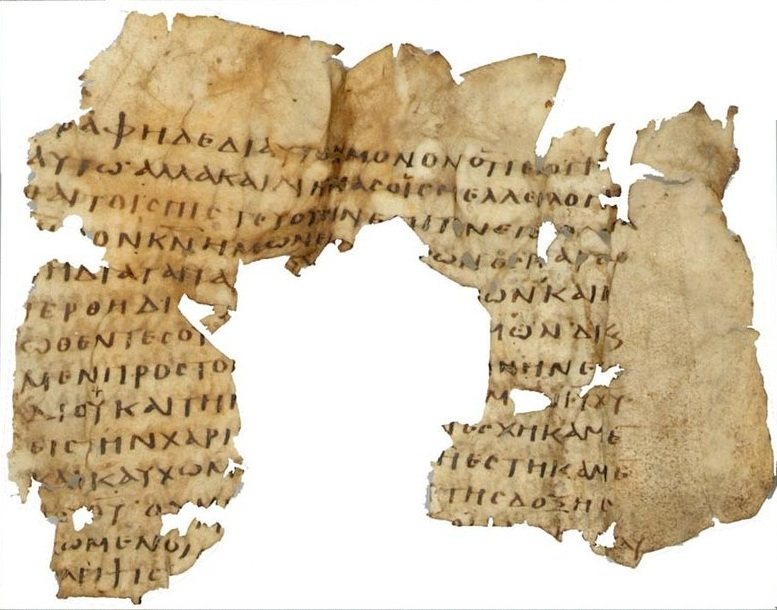
Romans 4:23–5:3 on uncial 0220 (recto; c. AD 250)

The Epistle to the Romans (Note: The book is sometimes called the Letter of Paul to the Romans, Book of Romans, or simply Romans. It is most commonly abbreviated as Rom.) is the sixth book in the New Testament, and the longest of the thirteen Pauline epistles. Biblical scholars agree that it was composed by Paul the Apostle to explain that salvation is offered through the gospel of Jesus Christ.

Romans was likely written while Paul was staying in the house of Gaius in Corinth. The epistle was probably transcribed by Paul's amanuensis Tertius and is dated AD late 55 to early 57. Although the epistle in its ultimate form consists of 16 chapters, versions with only the first 14 or 15 chapters circulated early. Some of these recensions lacked all reference to the original audience of Christians in Rome, making it very general in nature. Other textual variants include subscripts explicitly mentioning Corinth as the place of composition and name Phoebe, a deacon of the church in Cenchreae, as the messenger who took the epistle to Rome.

Prior to composing the epistle, Paul had evangelized the areas surrounding the Aegean Sea and was eager to take the gospel farther to Spain, a journey that would allow him to visit Rome on the way. The epistle can consequently be understood as a document outlining his reasons for the trip and preparing the church in Rome for his visit. Christians in Rome would have been of both Jewish and Gentile background and it is possible that the church suffered from internal strife between these two groups. Paul – a Hellenistic Jew and former Pharisee – shifts his argument to cater to both audiences and the church as a whole. Because the work contains material intended both for specific recipients as well as the general Christian public in Rome, scholars have had difficulty categorizing it as either a private letter or a public epistle.

Although sometimes considered a treatise of (systematic) theology, Romans remains silent on many issues that Paul addresses elsewhere, but is nonetheless generally considered substantial, especially on justification and salvation. Proponents of both sola fide and the Roman Catholic position of the necessity of both faith and works find support in Romans.

== General presentation ==
In the opinion of Jesuit biblical scholar Joseph Fitzmyer, the book "overwhelms the reader by the density and sublimity of the topic with which it deals, the gospel of the justification and salvation of Jew and Greek alike by the grace of God through faith in Jesus Christ, revealing the uprightness and love of God the Father."

Anglican bishop N. T. Wright notes that Romans is:

... neither a systematic theology nor a summary of Paul's lifework, but it is by common consent his masterpiece. It dwarfs most of his other writings, an Alpine peak towering over hills and villages. Not all onlookers have viewed it in the same light or from the same angle, and their snapshots and paintings of it are sometimes remarkably unalike. Not all climbers have taken the same route up its sheer sides, and there is frequent disagreement on the best approach. What nobody doubts is that we are here dealing with a work of massive substance, presenting a formidable intellectual challenge while offering a breathtaking theological and spiritual vision.

== Authorship and dating ==
The scholarly consensus is that Paul wrote the Epistle to the Romans. C. E. B. Cranfield, in the introduction to his commentary on Romans, says:

The denial of Paul's authorship of Romans by such critics [...] is now rightly relegated to a place among the curiosities of NT scholarship. Today no responsible criticism disputes its Pauline origin. The evidence of its use in the Apostolic Fathers is clear, and before the end of the second century it is listed and cited as Paul's. Every extant early list of NT books includes it among his letters. The external evidence of authenticity could indeed hardly be stronger; and it is altogether borne out by the internal evidence, linguistic, stylistic, literary, historical and theological.

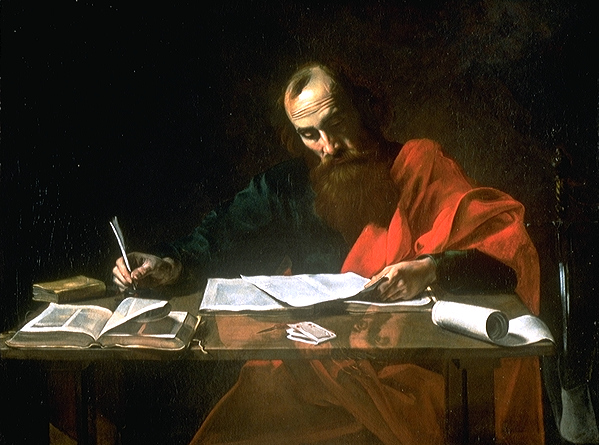
A 17th-century depiction of Paul writing his epistles. Romans 16:22 indicates that Tertius acted as his amanuensis.

The letter was most probably written while Paul was in Corinth, probably while he was staying in the house of Gaius, and transcribed by Tertius, his amanuensis. There are a number of reasons why Corinth is considered most plausible. Paul was about to travel to Jerusalem on writing the letter, which matches Acts where it is reported that Paul stayed for three months in Greece. This probably implies Corinth as it was the location of Paul's greatest missionary success in Greece. Additionally, Phoebe was a deacon of the church in Cenchreae, a port to the east of Corinth, and would have been able to convey the letter to Rome after passing through Corinth and taking a ship from Corinth's west port. Erastus, mentioned in Romans 16:23, also lived in Corinth, being the city's commissioner for public works and city treasurer at various times, again indicating that the letter was written in Corinth.

The precise time at which it was written is not mentioned in the epistle, but it was obviously written when the collection for Jerusalem had been assembled and Paul was about to "go unto Jerusalem to minister unto the saints", that is, at the close of his second visit to Greece, during the winter preceding his last visit to that city. The majority of scholars writing on Romans propose the letter was written in late 55/early 56 or late 56/early 57. Early 55 and early 58 both have some support, while German New Testament scholar Gerd Lüdemann argues for a date as early as 51/52 (or 54/55), following on from Knox, who proposed 53/54. Lüdemann is the only serious challenge to the consensus of mid to late 50s.

== Textual variants ==
=== Fourteen-chapter form ===
There is strong, albeit indirect, evidence that a recension of Romans that lacked chapters 15 and 16 was widely used in the western half of the Roman Empire until the mid-4th century. This conclusion is partially based on the fact that a variety of Church Fathers, such as Origen and Tertullian, refer to a fourteen-chapter edition of Romans, either directly or indirectly. The fact that Paul's doxology is placed in various different places in different manuscripts of Romans also strengthens the case for an early fourteen-chapter recension. However, while there is some uncertainty, Harry Gamble concludes that the canonical sixteen-chapter recension is likely the earlier version of the text.

The Codex Boernerianus lacks the explicit references to the Roman church as the audience of the epistle found in Romans 1:7 and 1:15. There is evidence from patristic commentaries indicating that Boernerianus is not unique in this regard; many early, no longer extant manuscripts also lacked an explicit Roman addressee in chapter 1. It is notable that, when this textual variant is combined with the omission of chapters 15 and 16, there is no longer any clear reference to the Roman church throughout the entire epistle. Harry Gamble speculates that 1:7, 1:15, and chapters 15 and 16 may have been removed by a scribe in order to make the epistle more suitable for a "general" audience.

=== Fifteen-chapter form ===
It is also possible that a fifteen-chapter form of Romans, omitting chapter 16, may have existed at an early date. Several scholars have argued, largely on the basis of internal evidence, that Chapter 16 represents a separate letter of Paul – possibly addressed to Ephesus – that was later appended to Romans.

There are a few different arguments for this conclusion. First of all, there is a concluding peace benediction at 15:33, which reads like the other Pauline benedictions that conclude their respective letters. Secondly, Paul greets a large number of people and families in chapter 16, in a way that suggests he was already familiar with them, whereas the material of chapters 1–15 presupposes that Paul has never met anyone from the Roman church. The fact that Papyrus 46 places Paul's doxology at the end of chapter 15 can also be interpreted as evidence for the existence of a fifteen-chapter recension of the epistle.

=== Subscript ===
Some manuscripts have a subscript at the end of the Epistle:

- προς Ρωμαιους ("to the Romans") is found in these manuscripts: Codex Sinaiticus, Codex Alexandrinus, Codex Vaticanus, Codex Ephraemi Rescriptus, Codex Claromontanus;
- προς Ρωμαιους εγραφη απο Κορινθου ("to the Romans it was written from Corinth"): B^{2}, D^{2} (P);
- προς Ρωμαιους εγραφη απο Κορινθου δια Φοιβης της διακονου ("to the Romans it was written from Corinth by Phoebe the deacon"): 42, 90, 216, 339, 462, 466*, 642;
- εγραφη η προς Ρωμαιους επιστολη δια Τερτιου επεμφτη δε δια Φοιβης απο Κορινθιων της εν Κεγχρεαις εκκλησιας ("the epistle to the Romans was written by Tertius and was sent by Phoebe from the Corinthians of the church in Cenchreae"): only in 337;
- προς Ρωμαιους εγραφη απο Κορινθου δια Φοιβης της διακονου της εν Κεγχρεαις εκκλησιας ("to the Romans it was written from Corinth by Phoebe the deacon of the church in Cenchreae"): 101, 241, 460, 466, 469, 602, 603, 605, 618, 1923, 1924, 1927, 1932, followed by Textus Receptus.

== Paul's life in relation to his epistle ==
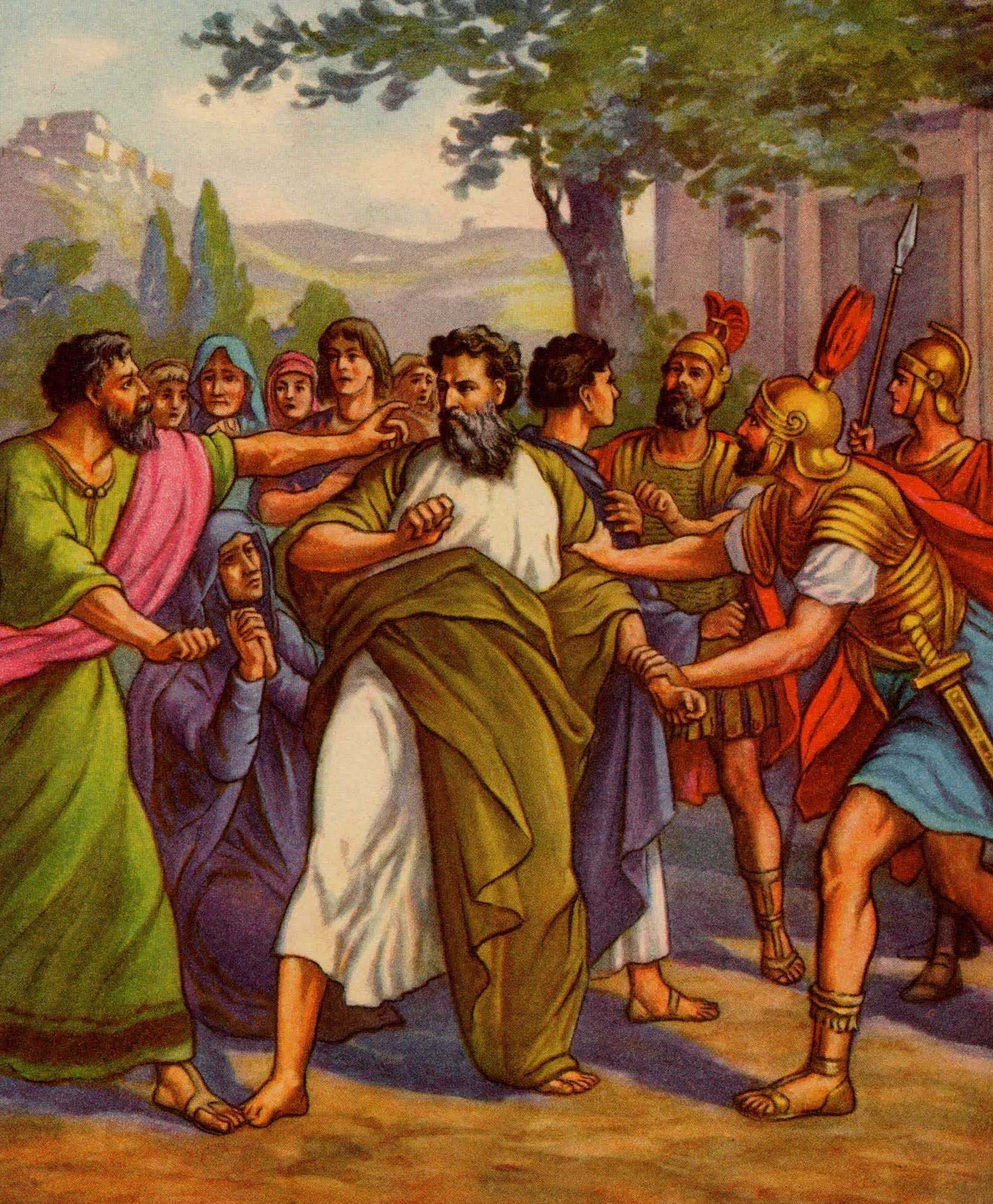
Saint Paul arrested by the Romans

For ten years before writing the letter (c. 47–57 AD), Paul had traveled around the territories bordering the Aegean Sea evangelizing. Churches had been planted in the Roman provinces of Galatia, Macedonia, Achaia and Asia. Paul, considering his task complete, wanted to preach the gospel in Spain, where he would not "build upon another man's foundation". This allowed him to visit Rome on the way, a long-time ambition of his. The letter to the Romans, in part, prepares them and gives reasons for his visit.

In addition to Paul's geographic location, his religious views are important. First, Paul was a Hellenistic Jew with a Pharisaic background (see Gamaliel), integral to his identity (see Paul the Apostle and Judaism). His concern for his people is one part of the dialogue and runs throughout the letter. Second, the other side of the dialogue is Paul's conversion and calling to follow Christ in the early 30s.

== The churches in Rome ==
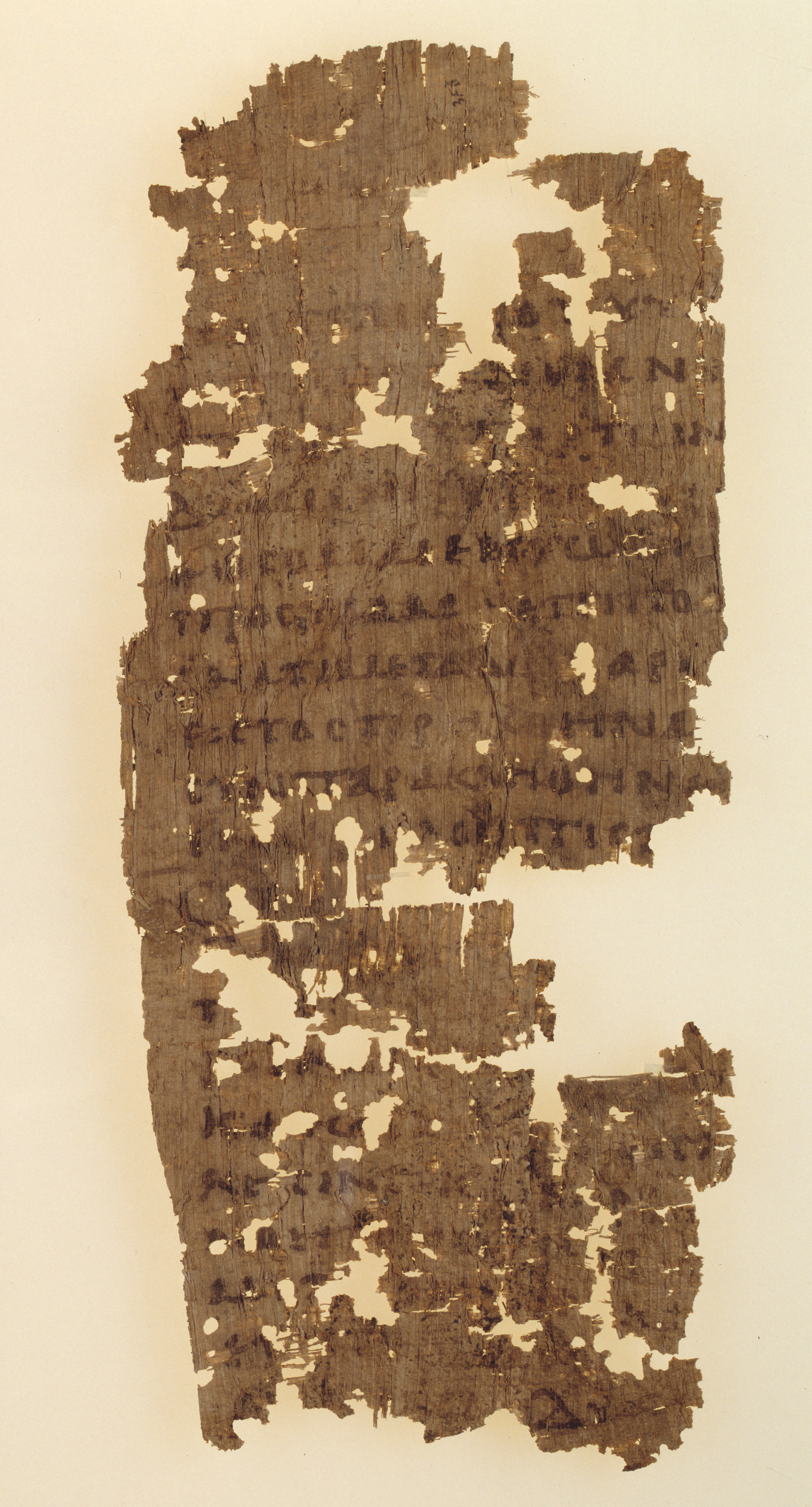
Papyrus, Oxyrhynchus, Egypt: 6th century – Epistle to the Romans 1:1–16

The most probable ancient account of the beginning of Christianity in Rome is given by a 4th-century writer known as Ambrosiaster:

It is established that there were Jews living in Rome in the times of the Apostles, and that those Jews who had believed [in Christ] passed on to the Romans the tradition that they ought to profess Christ but keep the law [Torah] [...] One ought not to condemn the Romans, but to praise their faith, because without seeing any signs or miracles and without seeing any of the apostles, they nevertheless accepted faith in Christ, although according to a Jewish rite.

From Adam Clarke:

The occasion of writing the epistle: [...] Paul had made acquaintance with all circumstances of the Christians at Rome [...] and finding that it was [...] partly of heathens converted to Christianity, and partly of Jews, who had, with many remaining prejudices, believed in Jesus as the true Messiah, and that many contentions arose from the claims of the Gentiles to equal privileges with the Jews, and from absolute refusal of the Jews to admit these claims, unless the Gentile converts become circumcised; he wrote this epistle to adjust and settle these differences.

At this time, the Jews made up a substantial number in Rome, and their synagogues, frequented by many, enabled the Gentiles to become acquainted with the story of Jesus of Nazareth. Consequently, churches composed of both Jews and Gentiles were formed at Rome. According to Irenaeus, a 2nd-century Church Father, the church at Rome was founded directly by the apostles Peter and Paul. However, many modern scholars disagree with Irenaeus, holding that while little is known of the circumstances of the church's founding, it was not founded by Paul:

Many of the brethren went out to meet Paul on his approach to Rome. There is evidence that Christians were then in Rome in considerable numbers and probably had more than one place of meeting.

— Easton's Bible Dictionary

The large number of names in Romans 16:3–15 of those then in Rome, and verses 5, 15 and 16, indicate there was more than one church assembly or company of believers in Rome. Verse 5 mentions a church that met in the house of Aquila and Priscilla. Verses 14 and 15 each mention groupings of believers and saints.

Jews were expelled from Rome because of disturbances around AD 49 by the edict of Claudius. Fitzmyer claims that both Jews and Jewish Christians were expelled as a result of their infighting. Claudius died around the year AD 54, and his successor, Emperor Nero, allowed the Jews back into Rome, but then, after the Great Fire of Rome of 64, Christians were persecuted. Fitzmyer argues that with the return of the Jews to Rome in 54 new conflict arose between the Gentile Christians and the Jewish Christians who had formerly been expelled. He also argues that this may be what Paul is referring to when he talks about the "strong" and the "weak" in Romans 15; this theory was originally put forth by W. Marxsen in Introduction to the New Testament: An Approach to its problems (1968) but is critiqued and modified by Fitzmyer. Fitzmyer's main contention is that Paul seems to be purposefully vague. Paul could have been more specific if he wanted to address this problem specifically. Keck thinks Gentile Christians may have developed a dislike of or looked down on Jews (see also Antisemitism and Responsibility for the death of Jesus), because they theologically rationalized that Jews were no longer God's people.

== Style ==
Scholars often have difficulty assessing whether Romans is a letter or an epistle, a relevant distinction in form-critical analysis:

A letter is something non-literary, a means of communication between persons who are separated from each other. Confidential and personal in nature, it is intended only for the person or persons to whom it is addressed, and not at all for the public or any kind of publicity ... An Epistle is an artistic literary form, just like the dialogue, the oration, or the drama. It has nothing in common with the letter except its form: apart from that one might venture the paradox that the epistle is the opposite of a real letter. The contents of the epistle are intended for publicity—they aim at interesting "the public."

Joseph Fitzmyer argues, from evidence put forth by Stirewalt, that the style of Romans is an "essay-letter." Philip Melanchthon, a writer during the Reformation, suggested that Romans was caput et summa universae doctrinae christianae ("a summary of all Christian doctrine"). While some scholars suggest, like Melanchthon, that it is a type of theological treatise, this view largely ignores chapters 14 and 15 of Romans. There are also many "noteworthy elements" missing from Romans that are included in other areas of the Pauline corpus. The breakdown of Romans as a treatise began with F.C. Baur in 1836 when he suggested "this letter had to be interpreted according to the historical circumstances in which Paul wrote it."

Paul sometimes uses a style of writing common in his time called a diatribe. He appears to be responding to a critic (probably an imaginary one based on Paul's encounters with real objections in his previous preaching), and the letter is structured as a series of arguments. In the flow of the letter, Paul shifts his arguments, sometimes addressing the Jewish members of the church, sometimes the Gentile membership and sometimes the church as a whole.

== Purposes of writing ==
To review the current scholarly viewpoints on the purpose of Romans, along with a bibliography, see Dictionary of Paul and His Letters. For a 16th-century "Lollard" reformer view, see the work of William Tyndale. In his prologue to his translation of Romans, which was largely taken from the prologue of German Reformer Martin Luther, Tyndale writes that:

... this epistle is the principal and most excellent part of the new testament, and most pure evangelion, that is to say glad tidings and what we call the gospel, and also a light and a way in unto the whole scripture ... The sum and whole cause of the writings of this epistle, is, to prove that a man is justified by faith only: which proposition whoso denieth, to him is not only this epistle and all that Paul writeth, but also the whole scripture, so locked up that he shall never understand it to his soul's health. And to bring a man to the understanding and feeling that faith only justifieth, Paul proveth that the whole nature of man is so poisoned and so corrupt, yea and so dead concerning godly living or godly thinking, that it is impossible for her to keep the law in the sight of God.

== Contents ==
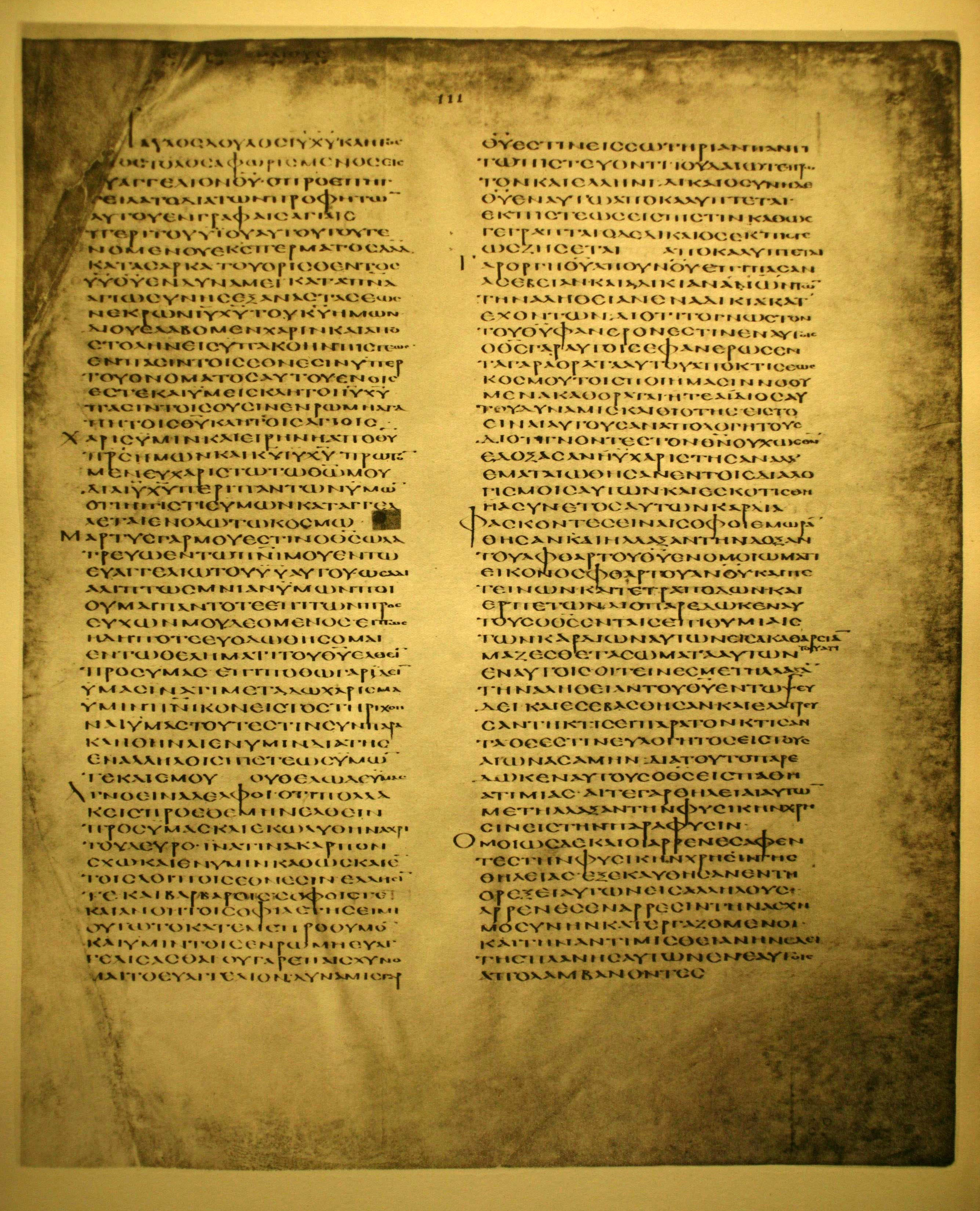
The beginning of the Epistle in Codex Alexandrinus

=== Prologue (1:1–15) ===
==== Greeting (1:1–7) ====
The introduction provides some general notes about Paul. He introduces his apostleship here and introductory notes about the gospel he wishes to preach to the church at Rome. Jesus' human line stems from David. Paul, however, does not limit his ministry to Jews. Paul's goal is that the Gentiles would also hear the gospel.

==== Prayer of thanksgiving (1:8–15) ====
Paul thanks God and commends the Romans for their faith. He also speaks of the past obstacles that have blocked his coming to Rome earlier.

=== Salvation in the Christ (1:16–8:39) ===
==== Righteousness of God (1:16–17) ====
Paul announces that he is not "ashamed" (epaiscúnomai) of his gospel because it holds power (dúnamis). These two verses form a backdrop of themes for the rest of the book; first, that Paul is unashamed of his love for this gospel that he preaches about Jesus Christ. He also notes that he is speaking to the "Jew first." There is significance to this, but much of it is scholarly conjecture as the relationship between Paul and Judaism is still debated, and scholars are hard-pressed to find an answer to such a question without knowing more about the audience in question. Wayne Brindle argues, based on Paul's former writings against the Judaizers in Galatians and 2 Corinthians, that rumors had probably spread about Paul totally negating the Jewish existence in a Christian world (see also Antinomianism in the New Testament and Supersessionism). Paul may have used the "Jew first" approach to counter such a view.

==== Condemnation: The Universal corruption of Gentiles and Jews (1:18–3:20) ====
===== The judgment of God (1:18–32) =====
Paul begins with a summary of Hellenistic Jewish apologist discourse. His summary begins by suggesting that humans have taken up ungodliness and wickedness for which there already is wrath from God. People have taken God's invisible image and made him into an idol. Paul draws heavily here from the Wisdom of Solomon. This summary condemns "unnatural sexual behavior" and warns that such behavior has already resulted in a depraved body and mind ("reprobate mind" in the King James Version) and says that people who do such things (including murder and wickedness) are worthy of death. Paul stands firmly against the idol worship system which was common in Rome. Several scholars believe the passage is a non-Pauline interpolation.

===== Paul's warning of hypocrites (2:1–4) =====
On the traditional Protestant interpretation, Paul here calls out Jews who are condemning others for not following the law when they themselves are also not following the law. Stanley Stowers, however, has argued on rhetorical grounds that Paul is in these verses not addressing a Jew at all but rather an easily recognizable caricature of the typical boastful person (ὁ ἀλαζων). Stowers writes, "There is absolutely no justification for reading 2:1–5 as Paul's attack on 'the hypocrisy of the Jew.' No one in the first century would have identified ho alazon with Judaism. That popular interpretation depends upon anachronistically reading later Christian characterizations of Jews as 'hypocritical Pharisees'". (See also Anti-Judaism).

==== Justification: The Gift of Grace and Forgiveness through Faith (3:21–5:11) ====
Paul says that a righteousness from God has made itself known apart from the law, to which the law and prophets testify, and this righteousness from God comes through faith in Jesus to all who believe. He describes justification – legally clearing the believer of the guilt and penalty of sin – as a gift of God, and not the work of man (lest he might boast), but by faith.

==== Assurance of salvation (5–11) ====
In chapters five through eight, Paul argues that believers can be assured of their hope in salvation, having been freed from the bondage of sin. Paul teaches that through faith, the faithful have been joined with Jesus and freed from sin. Believers should celebrate in the assurance of salvation and be certain that no external force or party can take their salvation away from them. (Note: These verses are commonly quoted to provide evidence of eternal security; however, groups who oppose eternal security state that this does not take into account the individual believer choosing voluntarily to leave Christianity.) This promise is open to everyone since everyone has sinned, save the one who paid for all of them.

In Romans 7:1, Paul says that humans are under the law while they live: "Know ye not [...] that the law hath dominion over a man as long as he liveth?" However, Jesus' death on the cross makes believers dead to the law (7:4, "Wherefore, my brethren, ye are also become dead to the law by the body of Christ"), according to an antinomistic interpretation.

In chapters 9–11 Paul addresses the faithfulness of God to the Israelites, where he says that God has been faithful to his promise. Paul hopes that all Israelites will come to realize the truth, stating that "Not as though the word of God hath taken none effect. For they are not all Israel, which are of Israel: Neither, because they are the seed of Abraham, are they all children: but, In Isaac shall thy seed be called." Paul affirms that he himself is also an Israelite, and had in the past been a persecutor of Early Christians. In Romans 9–11 Paul talks about how the nation of Israel has not been cast away, and the conditions under which Israel will be God's chosen nation again: when Israel returns to its faith, sets aside its unbelief.

=== Transformation of believers (12–15:13) ===
From chapter 12 through the first part of chapter 15, Paul outlines how the gospel transforms believers and the behaviour that results from such a transformation. This transformation is described as a "renewing of your mind" (12:2), a transformation that Douglas J. Moo characterizes as "the heart of the matter." It is a transformation so radical that it amounts to "a transfiguration of your brain," a "metanoia", a "mental revolution."

Paul goes on to describe how believers should live. Christians are no longer under the law, that is, no longer bound by the law of Moses, but under the grace of God (see Law and grace). Christians do not need to live under the law because to the extent that their minds have been renewed, they will know "almost instinctively" what God wants of them. The law then provides an "objective standard" for judging progress in the "lifelong process" of their mind's renewal.

To the extent they have been set free from sin by renewed minds (Romans 6:18), believers are no longer bound to sin. Believers are free to live in obedience to God and love everybody. As Paul says in Romans 13:10, "love (ἀγάπη) worketh no ill to his neighbor: therefore love is the fulfilling of law".

==== Obedience to earthly powers (13:1–7) ====
The fragment in Romans 13:1–7 dealing with obedience to earthly powers is considered by some, for example James Kallas, to be an interpolation. (See also the Great Commandment and Christianity and politics). Paul Tillich accepts the historical authenticity of Romans 13:1–7, but claims it has been misinterpreted by churches with an anti-revolutionary bias:

One of the many politico-theological abuses of biblical statements is the understanding of Paul's words [Romans 13:1–7] as justifying the anti-revolutionary bias of some churches, particularly the Lutheran. But neither these words nor any other New Testament statement deals with the methods of gaining political power. In Romans, Paul is addressing eschatological enthusiasts, not a revolutionary political movement.

=== Epilogue (15:1–16:23) ===
- Admonition (15:1–7)
- Summary of the Epistle (15:8)

==== Paul's ministry and travel plans (16:14–27) ====
The concluding verses contain a description of his travel plans, personal greetings and salutations. One-third of the twenty-one Christians identified in the greetings are women. Additionally, none of these Christians answer to the name Peter, although according to the Catholic tradition, he had been Pope in Rome for about 25 years. Possibly related was the Incident at Antioch between Paul and Cephas.

- Personal greetings (16:1–23 [24])
- Closing doxology (16:25–27)

== Hermeneutics ==
=== Catholic interpretation ===
Roman Catholics accept the necessity of faith for salvation but point to Romans 2:5–11 for the necessity of living a virtuous life as well:

But by your hard and impenitent heart you are storing up wrath for yourself on the day of wrath when God's righteous judgment will be revealed. For he will render to every man according to his works: to those who by patience in well-doing seek for glory and honor and immortality, he will give eternal life; but for those who are factious and do not obey the truth, but obey wickedness, there will be wrath and fury. There will be tribulation and distress for every human being who does evil, the Jew first and also the Greek, but glory and honor and peace for every one who does good, the Jew first and also the Greek. For God shows no partiality.

Catholics would also look to the passage in Romans 8:13 for evidence that justification by faith is only valid so long as it is combined with obedient cooperation with The Holy Spirit, and the passage in Romans 11:22 to show that the Christian can lose their justification if they turn away from cooperating with The Holy Spirit and reject Christ through mortal sin.

=== Protestant interpretation ===
In the Protestant interpretation, the New Testament epistles (including Romans) describe salvation as coming from faith and not from righteous actions. For example, Romans 4:2–5 (underlining added):

2 For if Abraham were justified by works, he hath whereof to glory; but not before God. 3 For what saith the scripture? Abraham believed God, and it was counted unto him for righteousness. 4 Now to him that worketh is the reward not reckoned of grace, but of debt. 5 But to him that worketh not, but believeth on him that justifieth the ungodly, his faith is counted unto him for righteousness.

In the Protestant interpretation it is considered significant that in Romans chapter 2:9, Paul says that God will reward those who follow the law and then goes on to say that no one follows the law perfectly (see also Sermon on the Mount: Interpretation) Romans 2:21–29:

21 Thou therefore which teachest another, teachest thou not thyself? thou that preachest a man should not steal, dost thou steal? 22 Thou that sayest a man should not commit adultery, dost thou commit adultery? thou that abhorrest idols, dost thou commit sacrilege? 23 Thou that makest thy boast of the law, through breaking the law dishonourest thou God? 24 For the name of God is blasphemed among the Gentiles through you, as it is written. 25 For circumcision verily profiteth, if thou keep the law: but if thou be a breaker of the law, thy circumcision is made uncircumcision. 26 Therefore if the uncircumcision keep the righteousness of the law, shall not his uncircumcision be counted for circumcision? 27 And shall not uncircumcision which is by nature, if it fulfil the law, judge thee, who by the letter and circumcision dost transgress the law? 28 For he is not a Jew, which is one outwardly; neither is that circumcision, which is outward in the flesh: 29 But he is a Jew, which is one inwardly; and circumcision is that of the heart, in the spirit, and not in the letter; whose praise is not of men, but of God.

Romans has been at the forefront of several major movements in Protestantism. Martin Luther's lectures on Romans in 1515–1516 probably coincided with the development of his criticism of Roman Catholicism which led to the 95 Theses of 1517. In the preface to his German translation of Romans, Luther described Paul's letter to the Romans as "the most important piece in the New Testament. It is purest Gospel. It is well worth a Christian's while not only to memorize it word for word but also to occupy himself with it daily, as though it were the daily bread of the soul". In 1738, while hearing Luther's Preface to the Epistle to the Romans read at St. Botolph Church on Aldersgate Street in London, John Wesley famously felt his heart "strangely warmed", a conversion experience that is often seen as the beginning of Methodism.

Luther controversially added the word "alone" (allein in German) to Romans 3:28 so that it read: "thus, we hold, then, that man is justified without doing the works of the law, alone through faith". The word "alone" does not appear in the original Greek text, but Luther defended his translation by maintaining that the adverb "alone" was required both by idiomatic German and Paul's intended meaning. This is a "literalist view" rather than a literal view of the Bible.

The Romans Road (or Roman Road) refers to a set of scriptures from Romans that Christian evangelists use to present a clear and simple case for personal salvation to each person, as all the verses are contained in one single book, making it easier for evangelism without going back and forth through the entire New Testament. The core verses used by nearly all groups using Romans Road are: Romans 3:23, 6:23, 5:8, 10:9, and 10:13.

== See also ==
- The Epistle to the Romans (Barth)
- Loci communes
- New Perspective on Paul
- Paul the Apostle and Judaism
- Rudyard Kipling 1919 poem "The Gods of the Copybook Headings" "The Wages of Sin is Death." Romans 6:23
- The Justice of God in the Damnation of Sinners, sermon on Romans 3:19
- Textual variants in the New Testament § Epistle to the Romans

== Explanatory notes ==
Epistle to the Romans Pauline Epistle
Preceded by Acts	New Testament; Books of the Bible	Succeeded by 1 Corinthians
