= Minuscule 468 =

- New Testament manuscript
- Text: New Testament (except Gospels)
- Date: 13th-century
- Script: Greek
- Now at: Bibliothèque nationale de France
- Size: 22.7 cm by 15.8 cm
- Type: Byzantine text-type
- Category: none

Minuscule 468 (in the Gregory-Aland numbering), Ο^{30} (in the Soden numbering), is a Greek minuscule manuscript of the New Testament, on paper. Palaeographically it has been assigned to the 13th century. Formerly it was labeled by 118^{a}, 138^{p}, and 55^{r}.

== Description ==
The codex contains the text of the New Testament except Gospels on 200 paper leaves (size 22.7 cm by 15.8 cm), with only one lacuna (Acts 19:18-22:17). The text is written in one column per page, 28 lines per page (size of text 15.7 by 10 cm).

It contains prolegomena, Journeys and death of Paul (as in 102, 206, 216, 223, 256, 614, 665, 909, 912), tables of the κεφαλαια (tables of contents) before each book, numbers of the κεφαλαια (chapters) at the margin, (not τιτλοι), lectionary markings at the margin, αναγνωσεις (to Acts, Cath. and Paul), subscriptions at the end of each book, and numbers of στιχοι. It has not much αναγνωσεις to the Acts and Apocalypse, but a lot to the Pauline epistles.

The order of books: Acts of the Apostles, Catholic epistles, Pauline epistles, and Book of Revelation.

== Text ==
Kurt Aland did not place the Greek text of the codex in any Category. It is an important witness to the 13th century Byzantine text.

== History ==
The manuscript was slightly examined and described by Scholz, Paulin Martin, and C. R. Gregory (1885). Herman C. Hoskier examined and collated its text only in Book of Revelation.

It was added to the list of New Testament manuscripts by Scholz. Formerly it was labeled by 118^{a}, 138^{p}, and 55^{r}. In 1908 Gregory gave the number 468 to it. Gregory saw it in 1885.

It is currently housed at the Bibliothèque nationale de France (Gr. 101) in Paris.

== See also ==
- List of New Testament minuscules
- Biblical manuscript
- Textual criticism
