= Minuscule 256 =

- New Testament manuscript
- Text: Acts, Paul, Revelation
- Date: 11th century
- Script: Greek-Armenian
- Now at: National Library of France
- Size: 28.9 cm by 22.7 cm
- Type: Alexandrian, Byzantine
- Category: II, V
- Note: marginalia

Minuscule 256 (in the Gregory-Aland numbering of New Testament manuscripts), α^{216} (in the von Soden numbering of New Testament manuscripts), is a Greek-Armenian minuscule manuscript of the New Testament, written on parchment. Using the study of comparative writing styles (palaeography), it has been assigned to the 11th century. It was adapted for liturgical use.

Formerly it was assigned by 301^{a}, 259^{p}, and 102^{r}.

== Description ==
The manuscript is a codex (precursor to the modern book), containing the text of the Acts of the Apostles, Catholic epistles, Pauline epistles, and Book of Revelation, on 323 parchment leaves (28.9 cm by 22.7 cm), with some gaps. The text is written in two columns per page, 36 lines per page.

It contains prolegomena, Journeys and death of Paul (as codices 102, 206, 216, 468, 614, 665, 909, 912), table of contents (known as κεφαλαια / kephalaia) before each book, lectionary equipment at the margin, subscriptions at the end of each book, and the number of lines (known as στιχοι / stichoi).

== Text ==
The Greek text of the codex is considered a representative of the Alexandrian text-type in the Pauline epistles, and the Byzantine elsewhere.

The ending of the Epistle to the Romans has an unusual order of verses: 16:23; 16:25-27; 16:24 (as in codices P 33 104 263 365 436 459 1319 1573 1837 1852 syr^{p} arm).

== History ==
The manuscript once belonged to the Archbishop of Tarsus (1153-1198). It was examined and described by Paulin Martin. The manuscript was collated by Christian F. Matthaei and Herman C. Hoskier (only Apocalypse).

Gregory saw it in 1885. It was formerly designated by the numbers 301^{a}, 259^{p}, and 102^{r} before receiving its now more common number in 1908 of 256.

The manuscript is currently housed at the Bibliothèque nationale de France (Armen. 27 (9)) at Paris, France.

== See also ==
- List of New Testament minuscules
- Biblical manuscript
- Textual criticism
