= Minuscule 102 =

- New Testament manuscript
- Text: Acts, Pauline epistles
- Date: 1444
- Script: Greek
- Now at: State Historical Museum
- Size: 29.1 cm by 21.8 cm
- Category: none
- Hand: carelessly written

Minuscule 102 (in the Gregory-Aland numbering), α 499 (Soden), is a Greek minuscule manuscript of the New Testament, on paper leaves. Palaeographically it has been assigned to the 15th century. Formerly it was labelled by 99^{a} and 114^{p}.

== Description ==
The codex contains a complete text of the Acts, Catholic epistles, and Pauline epistles on 111 paper leaves (size 29.1 cm by 21.8 cm). The text is written in one column per page, 34 lines per page.

It contains prolegomena, Argumentum (explanation of using the Eusebian Canons), tables of the κεφαλαια (tables of contents) before each sacred book, liturgical books (Synaxarion and Menologion), Euthalian Apparatus, and some Patristic writings (on folios 112-407), among them the Life and Speeches of Gregory Nazianzus. It contains summaries of the journeys of St. Paul and his death (as in 206, 216, 256, 468, 614, 665, and 909, 912).

According to Scrivener the manuscript was "carelessly written".

Aland the Greek text of the codex did not place in any Category.

== History ==
According to the colophon it was written in 1444 by Theognostus, metropolitan of Perga and Attalia. The colophon states:

μετροπολιτου περγης και ατταλειας θεογνωστου, υπερτιμου και εξαρχου της κενης δευτερας παμφυλιας. εν ατταλου τη μητροπολει αμβλυωπων. Αρχιερευς νειλος.

In 1547 it was presented to the Iviron monastery at Mount Athos, where it was housed until 1655.

It was examined by Matthaei.

It is currently housed at the State Historical Museum (V. 412, S. 5), at Moscow.

== See also ==
- List of New Testament minuscules
- Biblical manuscript
- Textual criticism
