= Minuscule 42 =

- New Testament manuscript
- Name: Codex Maedicaeus
- Text: Acts, Paul, Rev
- Date: 11th century
- Script: Greek
- Now at: Stadtarchiv Frankfurt (Oder)
- Size: 20.5 cm by 15 cm
- Type: Byzantine, Caesarean
- Category: none
- Hand: carelessly written
- Note: marginalia

Minuscule 42 (in the Gregory-Aland numbering), α107 (Von Soden), known as Codex Maedicaeus is a Greek minuscule manuscript of the New Testament on parchment. Palaeographically it has been assigned to the 11th century. It has marginalia.

== Description ==
The codex contains the text of the Acts, Catholic epistles, Paul, Rev, on 303 parchment leaves (20.5 cm by 15 cm), with some lacunae (Acts 2:2-34; 2 Pt 1:2; 1 John 5:11-21; Rev 18:3-13). The text is written in one column per page, 22-23 lines per page.

It contains lists of the κεφαλαια (tables of contents) before each book, numbers of the κεφαλαια (chapters) at the margin, but no τιτλοι (titles) at the top of the pages, lectionary equipment at the margin (for liturgical use), and numbers of stichoi. According to F. H. A. Scrivener it is carelessly written.

According to the subscription at the end of the Epistle to the Romans, the Letter was written προς Ρωμαιους εγραφη απο Κορινθου δια Φοιβης της διακονου; the same subscription appears in manuscripts: 90, 216, 339, 462, 466*, 642;

== Text ==
Kurt Aland the Greek text of the codex did not assigned in any Category.

Its text has some resemblance with minuscule 51 and the Complutensian Polyglot.

According to Scrivener codex "exhibits many readings of the same class as codices 1, 13, 33, but its authority has the less weight".

In Revelation 8:13, it gives the unique reading of "ἀγγέλου ὡς ἀετοῦ" (angel like an eagle).

== History ==
Currently the manuscrit has been assigned by the INTF to the 11th century.

The codex was used by Ludolph Kuster in edition of Mill's Novum Testamentum in 1710. Mill ascribed it as "exemplar Regium Maedicaeum", and remarked its resemblance to the Codex Angelicus. Nicholas Westermann collated its text. It was quoted by Denis Amelote in his translation of the New Testament.

It was added to the list of the New Testament manuscripts by Wettstein. C. R. Gregory saw it in 1891.

It is currently housed at the Stadtarchiv Frankfurt (Oder) (Gr. 24) at Frankfurt (Oder).

== See also ==
- List of New Testament minuscules
- Biblical manuscript
- Textual criticism
