= Minuscule 206 =

- New Testament manuscript
- Text: Acts of the Apostles, Pauline epistles
- Date: 13th century
- Script: Greek
- Found: Carlyle
- Now at: Lambeth Palace
- Size: 26.5 cm by 17 cm
- Type: Caesarean, Byzantine
- Category: III, V
- Note: marginalia

Minuscule 206 (in the Gregory-Aland numbering), α 365 (Soden), is a Greek minuscule manuscript of the New Testament, partly on parchment, partly on paper (like codex 69). Palaeographically it has been assigned to the 15th century.

It has marginalia.

Formerly it was assigned by 214^{a} and 270^{p}. Scrivener labelled it by 182^{a}.

== Description ==
The codex contains the text of the Acts of the Apostles, Pauline epistles, and Catholic epistles on 397 leaves (size 26.5 cm by 17 cm), with some lacunae (Acts 1:1-12:3; 13:5-15(?); 2 John-Jude). The text is written in 1 column per page, 20 lines per page. The order of books: Acts of the Apostles, Catholic epistles, and Pauline epistles. It has some additional matter, like Journeys of Paul (as Minuscule 102, 216, 256, 468, 614, 665, 909, 912).

The text is divided according to the κεφαλαια (chapters), whose numbers are given at the margin.

It contains Prolegomena, tables of the κεφαλαια (tables of contents) before each book, lectionary markings at the margin, Synaxarion, and Menologion, and subscriptions at the end of each book.

2 John, 3 John, and Epistle Jude were supplied in the 14th century.

== Text ==
The Greek text of the codex is a representative of the Caesarean text-type in the Catholic epistles and the Byzantine text-type in rest of the books of the codex. Aland placed it in Category III in the Catholic epistles, and in Category V in rest of books.

In the Pauline epistles text is close to the codices 429, 522, 1891, and 2815.

In 2 Timothy 2:14 it reads Χριστου (of Christ) for θεοῦ (of God) along with 429, 1758.

== History ==
The manuscript was brought by Carlyle from a Greek island to England (along with minuscule 470).

It was examined and described by Scrivener.

Formerly it was assigned by 214^{a} and 270^{p}. In 1908 C. R. Gregory gave number 206 for it.

Formerly it was housed at the Lambeth Palace. It is currently housed at the Antiquariat Christi (1182), in London.

== See also ==
- List of New Testament minuscules
- Biblical manuscript
- Textual criticism
