= Artemidorus of Ephesus =

Artemidorus of Ephesus may refer to:

- Artemidorus Ephesius (fl. 100 BC), Greek geographer
- Artemidorus of Daldis (fl. 2nd century AD), interpreter of dreams, native of Ephesus
