= Rinck =

Rinck is a surname. Notable people with the surname include:

- Christian Heinrich Rinck (1770–1846), German composer and organist
- Frank Rinck (born 1986), German politician
- Henri Rinck (1870–1952), French chess composer
- Josef Wilhelm Rinck von Baldenstein (1704–1762), Prince-Bishop of Basel
- Wilhelm Friedrich Rinck (1793–1854), German Protestant priest, biblical scholar, and palaeographer
