= Minuscule 43 =

- New Testament manuscript
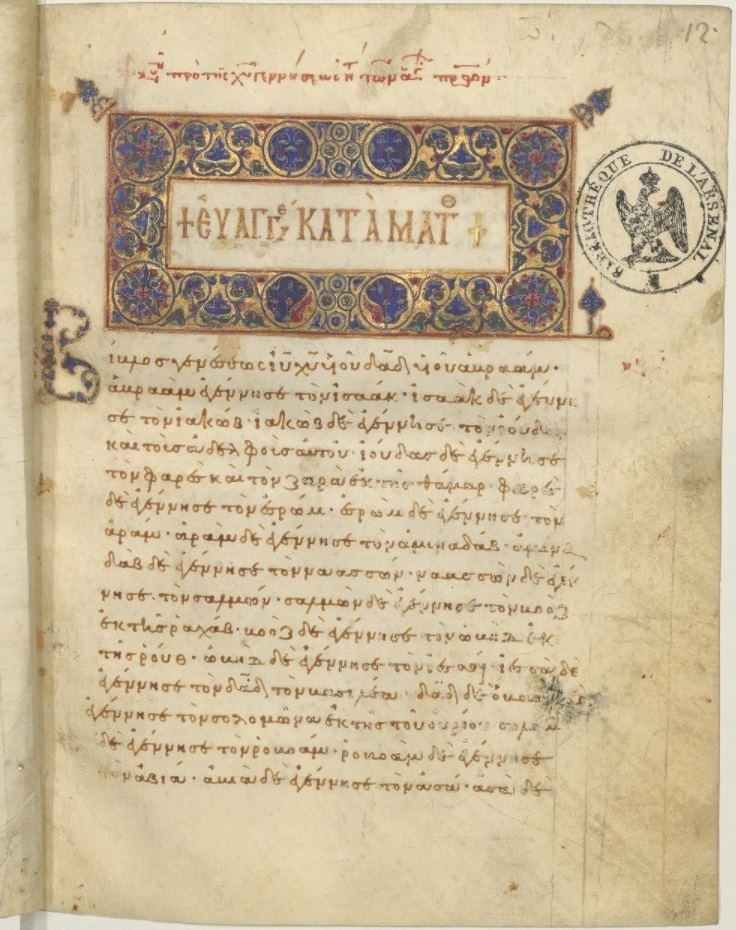
- Text: New Testament (except Rev) †
- Date: 11th century
- Script: Greek
- Now at: Bibliothèque de l'Arsenal
- Size: 20.6 cm by 16 cm 21.2 by 15.2 cm
- Type: Byzantine text-type
- Category: none
- Note: marginalia

Minuscule 43 (in the Gregory-Aland numbering), α 270 and ε 170 (Von Soden), is a Greek minuscule manuscript of the New Testament, on parchment leaves (20.5 by 15 cm). Palaeographically it has been assigned to the 11th century. Gregory suggested the 12th century. It has full marginalia.

== Description ==
It was split in two volumes. The first volume has Gospels on 199 leaves with size 20.6 cm by 16 cm. The second volume containing Acts and Epistles on 189 leaves with size 21.2 by 15.2 cm. The codex contains entire of the New Testament, except last its book - Apocalypse. It has also some lacunae.

The text is divided according to the κεφαλαια (chapters), whose numbers are given at the margin, with their τιτλοι (titles of chapters) at the top of the pages. The text of the Gospels has also another division according to the smaller Ammonian Sections (in Mark 234 sections, the last numbered section in 16:9), with references to the Eusebian Canons.

It contains the Epistula ad Carpianum, the Eusebian Canon tables, prolegomena, tables of the κεφαλαια (tables of contents) before every Gospel, (lectionary markings and αναγνωσεις were added by a later hand), subscriptions at the end of each book, numbers of στιχοι (in James and Pauline epistles).

== Text ==
The Greek text of the codex is a representative of the Byzantine text-type with some alien readings. Hermann von Soden classified it to the textual family K^{x}. Aland did not place it in any of his Categories. According to the Claremont Profile Method it represents the textual family K^{x}.

In 1 John 5:6 it has textual variant δι' ὕδατος καὶ πνεύματος (through water and spirit) together with the manuscripts 241, 463, 945, 1241, 1831, 1877*, 1891. (Note: For the other textual variants of this verse see: Textual variants in the First Epistle of John.)

== History ==
The manuscript was dated by Gregory to the 12th century (with some hesitation). Currently it has been assigned by the INTF to the 11th century.

Possibly it was written in Ephesus. It was given by P. de Berzi in 1661 to the Oratory of San Maglorian. It was examined and described by Amelotte, Simon, Scholz. and Paulin Martin, C. R. Gregory saw the manuscript in 1884.

It was added to the list of the New Testament manuscripts by Wettstein.

It is currently housed in at the Bibliothèque de l'Arsenal (8409. 8410), one of the branches of the Bibliothèque nationale de France, at Paris.

== See also ==
- List of New Testament minuscules
- Biblical manuscript
- Textual criticism
