= Minuscule 149 =

Greek minuscule manuscript of the New Testament

- New Testament manuscript
- Name: Palatino-Vaticanus 171
- Text: New Testament
- Date: 15th century
- Script: Greek
- Now at: Vatican Library
- Size: 35.5 cm by 23.5 cm
- Type: Byzantine text-type
- Category: V

Minuscule 149 (in the Gregory-Aland numbering), δ 503 (Soden), is a Greek minuscule manuscript of the New Testament, on parchment leaves. Palaeographically it has been assigned to the 15th century. It was adapted for liturgical use.

== Description ==
The codex contains the entire of the New Testament on 179 parchment leaves. The size of pages is 35.5 cm by 23.5 cm. The text is written in one column per page, in 33-35 lines per page (size of text is 22.6 cm by 13.9 cm). The capital letters in red. 10 leaves in quire.

It contains Prolegomena to the Catholic and Pauline epistles, and liturgical equipment at the margin. The parchment is fine and white.

The order of books is typical: Gospels, Acts, Catholic epistles, Pauline epistles, Revelation.

== Text ==
The Greek text of the codex is a representative of the Byzantine text-type. Hermann von Soden classified it to the textual family K^{x}. Aland placed it in Category V.

According to the Claremont Profile Method it represents the textual group 22b in Luke 1, Luke 10, and Luke 20 as a weak member.

== History ==
Birch dated the manuscript to the 14th century, Gregory to the 15th century. Presently the INTF dated it to the 15th century.

Amelotte quoted several of its readings. These readings were used by Wettstein. The manuscript was examined by Birch (about 1782), and Scholz. C. R. Gregory saw it in 1886.

The text of Apocalypse was collated by Hoskier.

It is currently housed at the Vatican Library (Pal. gr. 171), at Rome.

== See also ==
- List of New Testament minuscules
- Biblical manuscript
- Textual criticism
