= Minuscule 644 =

- New Testament manuscript
- Text: Pauline epistles, Catholic epistles
- Date: 14th century
- Script: Greek
- Found: 1853
- Now at: British Library
- Size: 18.4 cm by 14.9 cm
- Type: Byzantine text-type
- Category: V
- Note: very neat

Minuscule 644 (in the Gregory-Aland numbering), α 476 (von Soden), is a Greek minuscule manuscript of the New Testament, on parchment. Palaeographically it has been assigned to the 14th century. The manuscript is very lacunose. Gregory labelled it by 220^{a} and 275^{p}, Scrivener by 229^{a} (for the Catholic epistles) and 270^{p} (for the Pauline epistles).

== Description ==
The codex contains the text of the Pauline epistles and Catholic epistles, on 94 parchment leaves (size 18.4 cm by 14.9 cm), with lacunae (Romans, 2 Corinthians 1:1-11:25; James 4:4-5:4; 1 Peter 3:15-Jude). It is written in one column per page, 21 lines per page. According to Scrivener it is very neatly written.

It contains Prolegomena, tables of the κεφαλαια (chapters) before each epistle, τιτλοι (titles), lectionary markings on the margin, Menologion, subscriptions at the end of each epistle, and numbers of στιχοι at the margin.

According to Gregory it could be written by the same hand as Minuscule 502.

The order of books: Pauline epistles and Catholic epistles. Epistle to the Hebrews is placed after Epistle to Philemon.

== Text ==
The Greek text of the codex is a representative of the Byzantine text-type. Kurt Aland placed it in Category V.

== History ==
The manuscript is dated by the INTF to the 14th century.

The manuscript was bought from Constantine Simonides, the most versatile forger of the nineteenth century, for the British Museum in 1853. It is one of the very few authentic Simonides pieces. The manuscript was added to the list of New Testament manuscripts by Scrivener (229^{a}, 270^{p}) and Gregory (220^{a}, 275^{p}). It was examined and described by Bloomfield. Gregory saw the manuscript in 1883. In 1908 Gregory gave the number 644 to it.

The manuscript is currently housed at the British Library (Add MS 19388) in London.

== See also ==
- List of New Testament minuscules
- Biblical manuscript
- Textual criticism
- Minuscule 643
- Minuscule 645
