= Minuscule 502 =

- New Testament manuscript
- Text: Gospels †
- Date: 12th-century
- Script: Greek
- Found: 1834
- Now at: British Library
- Size: 21.5 cm by 16 cm
- Type: Byzantine text-type
- Category: V
- Note: full marginalia

Minuscule 502 (in the Gregory-Aland numbering), 589 (in the Scrivener's numbering), ε 245 (in the Soden numbering), is a Greek minuscule manuscript of the New Testament, on parchment. It was adapted for liturgical use. Palaeographically it has been assigned to the 12th century. It was adapted for liturgical use.

== Description ==
The codex contains the text of the four Gospels on 235 parchment leaves (size 21.5 cm by 16 cm) with only one lacuna (Matthew 1:1-8:5). The text is written in one column per page, 22 lines per page.

The text is divided according to the κεφαλαια (chapters), whose numbers are given at the margin, and their τιτλοι (titles of chapters) at the top of the pages. There is also a division according to the Ammonian Sections, with references to the Eusebian Canons (written at the margin below Ammonian Section numbers).

It contains Prolegomena, tables of the κεφαλαια (tables of contents) are placed before each Gospel, lectionary markings at the margin (for liturgical use), incipits, liturgical books with hagiographies (Synaxarion, Menologion), and subscriptions at the end of each Gospel.

== Text ==
The Greek text of the codex is a representative of the Byzantine text-type. Hermann von Soden included it to the textual family K^{x}. Aland placed it in Category V.

According to the Claremont Profile Method it represents textual family K^{x} in Luke 1 and Luke 20. In Luke 10 no profile was made. It belongs also to the textual cluster 74.

== History ==
It is dated by the INTF to the 12th century.

The manuscript was written by one Leo. Formerly it belonged to the monastery of St. Maximus. In 1853 it was bought together with Minuscule 503 from Constantine Simonides.

It was added to the list of New Testament manuscripts by F. H. A. Scrivener (589) and C. R. Gregory (502).

It was examined by Bloomfield, Scrivener, and Gregory (in 1883).

According to Gregory it could be written by the same hand as Minuscule 644.

It is currently housed at the British Library (Add MS 19387) in London.

== See also ==
- List of New Testament minuscules
- Biblical manuscript
- Textual criticism
