= Minuscule 665 =

- New Testament manuscript
- Text: Acts of the Apostles, Pauline epistles †
- Date: 13th century
- Script: Greek
- Now at: Bodleian Library
- Size: 23 cm by 17.5 cm
- Type: ?
- Category: none

Minuscule 665 (in the Gregory-Aland numbering), α 354 (von Soden), is a Greek minuscule manuscript of the New Testament, on parchment. Palaeographically it has been assigned to the 13th century. The manuscript is lacunose. Gregory labelled it by 222^{a} and 277^{p}. Scrivener labelled it by 213^{a} and 251^{p}.

== Description ==
The codex contains the entire of the Acts of the Apostles and Pauline epistles, on 149 parchment leaves (size 23 cm by 17.5 cm) with some lacunae (2 Peter 2:15-3:18; 3 John; Romans 10:17-1 Corinthians 1:7). The text of Romans 10:17-1 Corinthians 1:7 was supplied by a later hand.

The text is written in one column per page, 29-30 lines per page. The text is divided according to the κεφαλαια (chapters), whose numbers are given at the margin, with the τιτλοι (titles) at the top of the pages.

It contains Prolegomena, it has lectionary markings at the margin, liturgical books with hagiographies (Synaxarion and Menologion), subscriptions at the end of each book, numbers of stichoi, and Euthalian Apparatus to the Pauline epistles.

It contains additional material Journeys and death of Paul (as 102, 206, 216, 256, 468, 614, 912).

The order of books: Book of Acts, Catholic epistles, and Pauline epistles (Hebrews follows Philemon).

== Text ==
Kurt Aland the Greek text of the codex did not place in any Category.

== History ==
Scrivener and Gregory dated the manuscript to the 13th century. Currently the manuscript is dated by the INTF to the 13th century.

Currently the manuscript is housed at the Bodleian Library (Auct. F. 6.24), in Oxford.

== See also ==
- List of New Testament minuscules
- Biblical manuscript
- Textual criticism
- Minuscule 653
