= Lectionary 34 =

Lectionary ℓ 34
- New Testament manuscript
- Name: Codex Monacensis 329
- Text: Evangelistarion
- Date: 9th-century
- Script: Greek
- Now at: Bavarian State Library
- Size: 27.5 cm by 21 cm
- Hand: elegantly written

Lectionary 34, designated by siglum ℓ 34 (in the Gregory-Aland numbering). It is a Greek manuscript of the New Testament, on parchment leaves. Palaeographically it has been assigned to the 9th century. The manuscript is lacunose.

== Description ==
The codex contains Lessons from the Gospels of John, Matthew, Luke lectionary (Evangelistarium), with only one lacuna at the end. It is written in Greek uncial letters, on 430 parchment leaves 27.5 cm × 21 cm (10.8 in × 8.3 in), 2 columns per page, 18 lines per page. Elegantly written in three volumes, the contents in an unusual order. Menologion suiting the custom of a monastery on Athos.

== History ==
Formerly the manuscript belonged to the Polish high noble family Radziwiłł (like ℓ 24). It was held in Mannheim. Rinck made extracts for Eichhorn. It was examined by Scholz. C. R. Gregory saw it in 1887.

The manuscript is sporadically cited in the critical editions of the Greek New Testament (UBS3).

Currently the codex is located in the Bavarian State Library (Gr. 329) in München.

== See also ==
- List of New Testament lectionaries
- Biblical manuscript
- Textual criticism

== Bibliography ==
- Gregory, Caspar René (1900). Textkritik des Neuen Testaments. Vol. 1. Leipzig: J.C. Hinrichs. p. 390.
