= Minuscule 907 =

- New Testament manuscript
- Text: Gospels
- Date: 14th century
- Script: Greek
- Now at: Mount Athos
- Size: 22 cm by 15 cm
- Type: ?
- Category: none
- Note: marginalia

Minuscule 907 (in the Gregory-Aland numbering), ε1323 (von Soden), is a 14th-century Greek minuscule manuscript of the New Testament on parchment. The manuscript has survived in complete condition. It has marginalia.

== Description ==
The codex contains the text of the four Gospels on 194 parchment leaves (size 22 cm by 15 cm). The text is written in one column per page, 26 lines per page.

The text is divided according to chapters (κεφαλαια), whose numbers are given at the margin, and their titles (τιτλοι) at the top of the pages. There is also another division according to the smaller Ammonian Sections (in Mark 239 Sections, the last in 19:20), without references to the Eusebian Canons.

It also contains Prolegomena to the four Gospels, Eusebian Canon tables, tables of the κεφαλαια, lectionary markings at the margin (for liturgical use), Synaxarion, and pictures.

== Text ==
The Greek text of the codex Kurt Aland did not place it in any Category. It was not examined by the Claremont Profile Method. In result its textual character is unknown.

It contains text of the Pericope Adulterae (John 7:53-8:11). In John 8:6 it has unique textual variant ευρωσι for εχωσι.

== History ==
C. R. Gregory dated the manuscript to the 14th century. Currently the manuscript is dated by the INTF to the 14th century. It was held at the Athos monastery (St. Andrew H'). C. R. Gregory saw it in 1886.

The manuscript was added to the list of New Testament manuscripts by Gregory (907^{e}). It was not on the Scrivener's list, but it was added to his list by Edward Miller in the 4th edition of A Plain Introduction to the Criticism of the New Testament.

Currently it is housed in the St Andrew Monastery (27), at Mount Athos.

== See also ==
- List of New Testament minuscules
- Minuscule 908
- Biblical manuscript
- Textual criticism
