= Minuscule 399 =

- New Testament manuscript
- Text: Gospels †
- Date: 9th/10th century
- Script: Greek
- Now at: National Library of Russia
- Size: 17.3 cm by 11.6 cm
- Type: Byzantine text-type
- Category: V

Minuscule 399 (in the Gregory-Aland numbering), ε94 (von Soden), is a Greek minuscule manuscript of the New Testament, on parchment. Paleographically it has been assigned to the 9th or 10th century.

== Description ==
The codex contains text of the four Gospels, on 214 parchment leaves (17.3 cm by 11.6 cm). The text is written in one column per page, in 27 lines per page. It contains lectionary markings at the margin.

The texts of John 5:3.4 and Pericope Adulterae (John 7:53-8:11) are marked by an obelus.

== Text ==
The Greek text of the codex is a representative of the Byzantine text-type. Hermann von Soden classified it to the textual family K^{1}. Aland placed it in Category V. According to the Claremont Profile Method it represents textual family K^{x} in Luke 10 and Luke 20. In Luke 1 it has a mixture of the Byzantine text-families.

== History ==
The manuscript is dated to the 9th or 10th century. It was added to the list of New Testament manuscripts by Gregory in 1908.

The manuscript is currently housed at the National Library of Russia (Gr. 220) in Saint Petersburg.

== Scholz's 399 ==
The codex contains incomplete text of the Gospels: John, Luke, and Matthew, on 220 parchment leaves (29.7 cm by 20.8 cm). The text is written in one column per page, in 22 lines per page. It contains prolegomena, the tables of the κεφαλαια (tables of contents) before each Gospel, numbers of Verses, and a commentary (of John Chrysostom, in Luke of Bostra's).

The order of Gospels is the same as in codex 90.

It was examined and described by Giuseppe Passini (as 109). It was added to the list of New Testament manuscripts by Scholz (1794-1852), who slightly examined it. Fenton Hort saw it in 1864. C. R. Gregory saw it in 1886. In 1908 Gregory removed it from the list of the New Testament manuscript, because it is rather a commentary than text and sometimes without text.

The manuscript is currently housed at the Turin National University Library (C. II. 14) in Turin.

== See also ==
- List of New Testament minuscules
- Biblical manuscript
- Textual criticism
