= Minuscule 642 =

- New Testament manuscript
- Text: Acts of the Apostles, Catholic epistles, Pauline epistles †
- Date: 14th century
- Script: Greek
- Now at: Lambeth Palace
- Size: 21.1 cm by 14.8 cm
- Type: Byzantine text-type
- Category: III/V

Minuscule 642 (in the Gregory-Aland numbering), α 552 (von Soden), is a Greek minuscule manuscript of the New Testament, on paper. Palaeographically it has been assigned to the 14th century. The manuscript is lacunose. Gregory labelled it by 217^{a} and 273^{p}; Scrivener labelled it by 185^{a} and 255^{p}.

== Description ==
The codex contains the text of the Acts of the Apostles, Catholic epistles, Pauline epistles, on 209 paper leaves (size 21.1 cm by 14.8 cm), with large lacunae (Acts 2:36–3:8; 7:3–59; 12:7–25; 14:8–27; 18:20–19:12; 22:7–23:11; 1 Corinthians 8:12–9:18; 2 Corinthians 1:1–10; Ephesians 3:2-Philemon 1:24; 2 Timothy 4:12-Tit 1:6; Hebrews 7:19–9:12).

The writing is in one column per page, 22–26 lines per page. It was written by four different hands. The breathings and accents are very irregular. Some words are half-written.

N ephelkystikon is rare, and the itacisms are pretty numerous (πνεμα for πνευμα).

It contains Prolegomena, tables of the κεφαλαια (tables of contents) before every book, numbers of the κεφαλαια (chapters), lectionary markings at the margin, incipits, Menologion, subscriptions at the end of each book, and numbers of στιχοι at the margin.

The order of books: Acts of the Apostles, Catholic epistles, and Pauline epistles. Epistle to the Hebrews is placed after Epistle to Philemon.

According to the subscription at the end of the Epistle to the Romans, the Letter was written προς Ρωμαιους εγραφη απο Κορινθου δια Φοιβης της διακονου; the same subscription have manuscripts: 42, 90, 216, 339, 462, and 466*;

== Text ==
The Greek text of the codex has the higher value in the Catholic epistles and much lower elsewhere. The text of the Catholic epistles Kurt Aland placed in Category III, the text of the Acts and the Pauline epistles Aland placed in Category V, it means it is a representative of the Byzantine text-type.

According to Wachtel it has between 20% and 30% non-Byzantine readings in the Catholic Epistles.

== History ==
The manuscript is dated by the INTF to the 14th century. The early history of the manuscript and the place of its origin is unknown.

The manuscript was brought from a Greek monastery to England by Joseph Dacre Carlyle (1759–1804), professor of Arabic, along with the manuscripts 471, 472, 473, 474, 475, 488, 470.

The manuscript was added to the list of New Testament manuscripts by Scrivener (185^{a} and 255^{p}) and Gregory (217^{a} and 273^{p}). Gregory saw the manuscript in 1883. In 1908 Gregory gave the number 642 to it.

The manuscript currently is housed at Lambeth Palace (1185), at London.

== See also ==
- List of New Testament minuscules
- Biblical manuscript
- Textual criticism
- Minuscule 641
- Minuscule 643
