= Minuscule 643 =

- New Testament manuscript
- Text: Catholic epistles †
- Date: 12th/13th century
- Script: Greek
- Now at: British Library
- Size: 37.7 cm by 26.5 cm
- Type: ?
- Category: none
- Hand: elegantly written

Minuscule 643 (in the Gregory-Aland numbering), α 1402 (von Soden), is a Greek minuscule manuscript of the New Testament, on paper. Palaeographically, it has been assigned to the 12th or the 13th century. The manuscript is lacunose. Gregory labelled it by 219^{a}, while Scrivener labelled it by 225^{a}.

== Description ==
The codex contains the text of the Catholic epistles except Epistle of Jude on 15 paper leaves (size 37.7 cm by 26.5 cm) with some lacunae (Acts 4:15-32; Ephesians 6:21-24; Hebrews 13:24-25). The text is written in one column per page, 28-32 lines per page, by an elegant hand.

It contains Prolegomena, tables of the κεφαλαια (tables of contents) before each book, numerals of the κεφαλαια at the margin, the τιτλοι at the top, lectionary markings, subscriptions at the end of each book, and numbers of stichoi. It has a space on the margin for a commentary.

The order of books: Epistle of James, 1-2 Epistles of Peter, 1-3 Epistles of John.

The same manuscript contains Homilies of St. Chrysostom from the Galatians to the Hebrews.

== Text ==
Kurt Aland the Greek text of the codex did not place in any Category.

According to Scrivener it has important variations (James 1:5.25; 3:3.14).

== History ==
The manuscript is dated by the INTF to the 12th/13th century.

The manuscript was added to the list of New Testament manuscripts by Scrivener (225^{a}) and Gregory (219^{a}). C. R. Gregory saw the manuscript in 1883. In 1908 Gregory gave the number 643 to it.

The manuscript currently is housed at the British Library (Burney MS 48/2), at London.

== See also ==
- List of New Testament minuscules
- Biblical manuscript
- Textual criticism
- Minuscule 642
- Minuscule 644
