= Denis Amelote =

French biblical writer and scholar

Denis Amelot Cong. Orat. (or Amelote, or Amelotte; 1609 – 7 October 1678) was a French biblical writer and scholar who is notable for his French translation of the New Testament (4 vols. 1666-170). In his translation he quoted Greek minuscule manuscripts: 42, 43, 44, and 149 (in Gregory-Aland numbering).

It is claimed that his translation of the New Testament contained the much-disputed Johannine Comma (1 John v. 7).

== Biography ==
Amelote was born in Saintes, in the ancient Province of Saintonge. He was ordained a priest in 1631, was a Doctor of the Sorbonne, and became a member of the French Oratory. He was a prominent opponent of Jansenism. He died in Paris.

== See also ==
- Pierre de Bérulle
- Charles de Condren
