= Minuscule 503 =

- New Testament manuscript
- Text: Gospel of John
- Date: 13th-century
- Script: Greek
- Now at: British Library
- Size: 12.3 cm by 8.5 cm
- Type: mixed
- Category: none
- Note: full marginalia

Minuscule 503 (in the Gregory-Aland numbering), ε 325 (in the Soden numbering), is a Greek minuscule manuscript of the New Testament, on parchment. Palaeographically it has been assigned to the 13th century. Scrivener labelled it by number 590. The manuscript is lacunose.

== Description ==
The codex contains the text of the Gospel of John on 60 parchment leaves (size 12.3 cm by 8.5 cm). The text is written in one column per page, 25-27 lines per page.

The text is divided according to the κεφαλαια (chapters) with numbers given at the margin, and their τιτλοι (titles of chapters) at the top of the pages. It is also divided according to the Ammonian Sections, but there are no references to the Eusebian Canons. It has lectionary markings at the margin (for liturgical use).

== Text ==
The Greek text of the codex is a mixture of the text-types. Aland did not place it in any Category.

== History ==
The manuscript was written by Cosmas Vanaretus, a monk. Formerly it belonged to the monastery of St. Maximus. In 1853 it was bought together with Minuscule 502 from Constantine Simonides.

It was added to the list of the New testament manuscripts by F. H. A. Scrivener (590) and C. R. Gregory (503).

It was examined by Bloomfield, Scrivener, and Gregory (in 1883).

It is currently housed at the British Library (Add MS 19389) in London.

== See also ==
- List of New Testament minuscules
- Biblical manuscript
- Textual criticism
