= Minuscule 463 =

- New Testament manuscript
- Text: Acts of the Apostles †
- Date: 12th century
- Script: Greek
- Now at: State Historical Museum
- Size: 30.2 cm by 22 cm
- Category: none

Minuscule 463 (in the Gregory-Aland numbering), is a Greek minuscule manuscript of the New Testament, on parchment. Palaeographically it has been assigned to the 12th century. Formerly it was labeled by 103^{a} and 118^{p}.

== Description ==
The codex contains scholia to the Acts and Epistles, with the entire text for Acts of the Apostles 1:1-9:12 on 235 parchment leaves (30.2 cm by 22 cm), with some lacunae. The text is written in two columns per page, 39 lines per page.

It contains prolegomena, Synaxarion, tables of the κεφαλαια (tables of contents) at the beginning, and scholia to the Acts, Catholic and the Pauline epistles.

The order of books: Acts, Catholic epistles, and Pauline epistles.

Kurt Aland the Greek text of the codex did not place in any Category.

In 1 John 5:6 it has textual variant δι' ὕδατος καὶ πνεύματος (through water and spirit) together with the manuscripts 43, 241, 945, 1241, 1831, 1877*, 1891. (Note: For the other textual variants of this verse see: Textual variants in the First Epistle of John.)

== History ==
The manuscript came from the Iviron monastery at Mount Athos.

The manuscript was examined by Matthaei and Treu. It is currently housed at the State Historical Museum (V. 95, S. 346) in Moscow.

Formerly it was labeled by 103^{a} and 118^{p}. In 1908 Gregory gave the number 463 to it.

== See also ==
- List of New Testament minuscules
- Biblical manuscript
- Textual criticism
