= Minuscule 339 =

- New Testament manuscript
- Text: New Testament
- Date: 13th century
- Script: Greek
- Now at: Turin National University Library
- Size: 21.6 cm by 15.7 cm
- Category: none
- Note: marginalia

Minuscule 339 (in the Gregory-Aland numbering), δ 303 (Soden), is a Greek minuscule manuscript of the New Testament, on parchment. Paleographically it has been assigned to the 13th century. It has marginalia.

== Description ==
The codex originally contained a complete text of the New Testament on 200 parchment leaves (21.6 cm by 15.7 cm). It was written in two columns per page, in 56-58 lines per page. It was written by three different hands. However, it was mostly destroyed by fire at the Turin library in 1904, and only charred fragments remain.

The text is divided according to the κεφαλαια (chapters), whose numbers are given at the margin, and their τιτλοι (titles of chapters) at the top of the pages. There is also a division according to the smaller Ammonian Sections (in Mark 237 – last in 16:15), whose numbers are given at the margin with references to the Eusebian Canons (written below Ammonian Section numbers).

It contains the Epistula ad Carpianum, Eusebian Canon tables, tables of κεφαλαια (tables of contents) before each book, Synaxarion, Menologion, the Eusebian apparatus (Acts, Cath., Paul), and other additional matter.

The order of book is typical for major Greek manuscripts: Gospels, Acts, Catholic epistles, Pauline epistles, Book of Revelation, but this order is not original.

It contains the Book of Psalms, Epistle of Pilatus with response, Genealogy of Maria.

According to the subscription at the end of the Epistle to the Romans, the Letter was written προς Ρωμαιους εγραφη απο Κορινθου δια Φοιβης της διακονου; the same subscription have manuscripts: 42, 90, 216, 462, 466, 642;

== Text ==
Kurt Aland the Greek text of the codex did not place in any Category. It was not examined by the Claremont Profile Method.

== History ==
The manuscript was examined by Pasino, Scholz, and Burgon. It was added to the list of New Testament manuscripts by Scholz (1794-1852). C. R. Gregory saw it in 1886.

The manuscript is currently housed at the Turin National University Library (B. V. 8) in Turin.

== See also ==
- List of New Testament minuscules
- Biblical manuscript
- Textual criticism
