= Constantine Simonides =

Greek paleographer and forger

Constantine Simonides (1820–1867) was a Greek palaeographer and dealer of icons, with knowledge of manuscripts and calligraphy. He was one of the most versatile forgers of the nineteenth century.

== Life ==
He was born on the small Greek island of Symi, in the southeastern Aegean Sea in 1820 (or in 1824). He was reported to have died in 1867 of leprosy in Alexandria, Egypt. That report is now seen as false, a faked death, and he passed in a small village in Albania in 1890 as Alcibiades Simonides.

Simonides lived in the monasteries on Mount Athos between 1839 and 1841 and again in 1852, during which time he acquired some of the biblical manuscripts that he later sold. He produced a lot of manuscripts ascribed to Hellenistic and early Byzantine periods. He allegedly forged a number of documents and manuscripts and claimed they were the originals of the Gospel of Mark, as well as original manuscripts of poems of Homer. He sold some of these manuscripts to the King of Greece. Greek scholars exposed what some claimed to be forgeries quickly and he left Greece and traveled from country to country with his manuscripts.

He visited England between 1853 and 1855 and other European countries, and his literary activity was extraordinary. Some of his works were published in Moscow, Odessa, in England, and in Germany. He also wrote many other works which were never published.

From 1843 until 1856 he offered manuscripts purporting to be of ancient origin for sale all over Europe. Frederic G. Kenyon writes that Simonides created "a considerable sensation by producing quantities of Greek manuscripts professing to be of fabulous antiquity – such as a Homer in an almost prehistoric style of writing, a lost Egyptian historian, a copy of St. Matthew's Gospel on papyrus, written fifteen years after the Ascension (!), and other portions of the New Testament dating from the first century. These productions [...] were then exposed as forgeries."

In 1854 and 1855 Simonides tried unsuccessfully to sell some manuscripts for the British Museum and the Bodleian Library. Thomas Phillipps was a less critical purchaser and bought for the Phillipps Library at Cheltenham some manuscripts. In 1855 he visited Berlin and Leipzig. He informed Wilhelm Dindorf that he owned a palimpsest of Uranius. After this was exposed as a forgery, the print run was destroyed by Oxford University Press after a small number of copies had been sold.

On 13 September 1862, in an article of The Guardian, he claimed that he was the real author of the Codex Sinaiticus and that he wrote it in 1839. According to him it was "the one poor work of his youth". According to Simonides, he visited Sinai in 1852 and saw the codex. Henry Bradshaw, a scholar, did not believe his claims.

Simonides questioned many official scientific positions accepted by scholars. He did not respect any scholars. He interpreted Egyptian hieroglyphics in different ways from Champollion and other Egyptologists. He tried to prove that his method of interpreting Egyptian hieroglyphics was superior. He placed the death of Irenaeus at 292 (c. 130 – c. 200). Also, in many other complicated questions he had his own, usually controversial, point of view, but after ascribing the authorship of the Codex Sinaiticus to himself, the rest of his credibility was destroyed by the British press.

== The Artemidorus Papyrus ==
In 2006 a papyrus book-roll was exhibited at Turin which appeared to be part of Book II of the lost Geographical Descriptions of Artemidorus Ephesius. It was exhibited again in Berlin in 2008. It has been argued by Luciano Canfora that the manuscript is the work of Constantine Simonides. Richard Janko also believes that the roll is a forgery. Following the controversy about its authenticity, the papyrus has been tested with the radiocarbon method, which produced a date between 40 BCE and 130 CE with a 95.4% level of confidence. The chemical composition of the ink has been analysed and has been found to be consistent with what we know of the ink produced in that time. After examining the text of the papyrus and the data of the radiometric analyses, the philologist Giambattista D'Alessio concluded that "the identification of this papyrus as a forgery by Constantine Simonides involves a great deal of altogether fantastic ad hoc hypothetical constructions that, far from providing a more economical explanation of the evidence, force their advocates into more and more implausible fictions".

== See also ==
Some of authentic manuscripts which were bought from Constantine Simonides

- Minuscule 502
- Minuscule 503
- Minuscule 644
- Minuscule 2793

== Sources ==
- "Miscellanies", The Journal of Sacred Literature, ed. Harris Cowper, Vol. II, Edinbourgh 1863, pp. 248–253.
- Falconer Madan, Books in manuscript : a short introduction to their study and use. With a Chapter on Records, London 1898, pp. 124–128.
