= Codex Radziwiłł =

10th-century Hellenic biblical manuscript

Lectionary ℓ 24
- New Testament manuscript
- Name: Codex Radziwiłł
- Text: Evangelistarion
- Date: 10th-century
- Script: Greek
- Now at: Bavarian State Library
- Size: 31.8 cm by 24.5 cm

Lectionary 24, designated by siglum ℓ 24 (in the Gregory-Aland numbering). It is a Greek manuscript of the New Testament, on vellum leaves, known as Codex Radziwiłł. Palaeographically it has been assigned to the 10th-century.

== Description ==
The codex contains lessons from the Gospels of John, Matthew, Luke lectionary (Evangelistarium), with lacunae. The text is written in Greek uncial letters, on 265 parchment leaves (31.8 cm by 24.5 cm), 2 columns per page, 21 lines per page. It contains Menologion and patristic homilies (Gregory of Nazianzus).

There are lessons for Saturdays and Sundays.

== History ==
The manuscript once belonged to the Polish high noble family Radziwiłł — like ℓ 34 — hence name of the codex. It was added to the list of the New Testament manuscripts by Wettstein.

The text of the codex was merely examined by Bengel (Augustianus 4), Matthaei, and Scholz. It was added to the list of the New Testament manuscripts by Bengel. Scrivener and Gregory dated the manuscript to the 10th-century. Gregory saw it in 1880 and 1887.

The manuscript is sporadically cited in the critical editions of the Greek New Testament (UBS3).

Currently the codex is located in the Bavarian State Library (Gr. 383) in München.

== See also ==
- List of New Testament lectionaries
- Biblical manuscript
- Textual criticism

== Bibliography ==
- Gregory, Caspar René (1900). Textkritik des Neuen Testaments. Vol. 1. Leipzig: J.C. Hinrichs. p. 389.
