= Minuscule 90 =

- New Testament manuscript
- Name: Codex Jo. Fabri
- Text: New Testament (except Rev.)
- Date: 16th century
- Script: Greek
- Now at: Amsterdam University
- Size: 20.5 cm by 14.3 cm
- Type: Byzantine text-type
- Category: V
- Note: close to codex 74

Minuscule 90 (in the Gregory-Aland numbering), δ 652 (Soden), known as Codex Jo. Fabri, is a Greek minuscule manuscript of the New Testament, on paper leaves. Palaeographically it has been assigned to the 16th century. It has full marginalia.

== Description ==
The codex contains the text of the four Gospels, Paul, Acts, and Catholic epistles. The Gospels follow in the order: John, Luke, Matthew, Mark (as in codex 382 and 399). Epistle of Jude is written twice, from different copies.

The codex was split in two volumes. First volume contains 227 paper leaves, 2 volume – 253 leaves. The text is written with size 25.5 cm by 17.6 cm, in one column per page, 17-30 lines per page.

The text is divided according to the κεφαλαια (chapters), whose numbers are given at the margin (also in Latin), and the τιτλοι (titles of chapters) at the top of the pages. There is also a division according to the Ammonian Sections, with references to the Eusebian Canons (written below Ammonian Section numbers).

It contains lectionary markings at the margin (for liturgical use), and Synaxarion.

According to the subscription at the end of the Epistle to the Romans, it was written προς Ρωμαιους εγραφη απο Κορινθου δια Φοιβης της διακονου; the same subscription have manuscripts: 42, 216, 339, 462, 466, 642;

== Text ==
The Greek text of the codex is a representative of the Byzantine text-type. Aland placed it in Category V.

The manuscript was not examined by using the Claremont Profile Method.

== History ==
This codex belonged in the past to Hinckelmann of Hamburg, and to Wolff. Possibly the manuscript was copied from minuscule 74. It was collated by Wettstein. C. R. Gregory saw it in 1891.

Formerly it was held in Hamburg. It is currently housed in at the Amsterdam University (Remonstr. 186), at Amsterdam.

== See also ==
- List of New Testament minuscules
- Biblical manuscript
- Textual criticism
