= Zacharias Conrad von Uffenbach =

German scholar, bibliophile, book-collector, traveller, palaeographer and consul

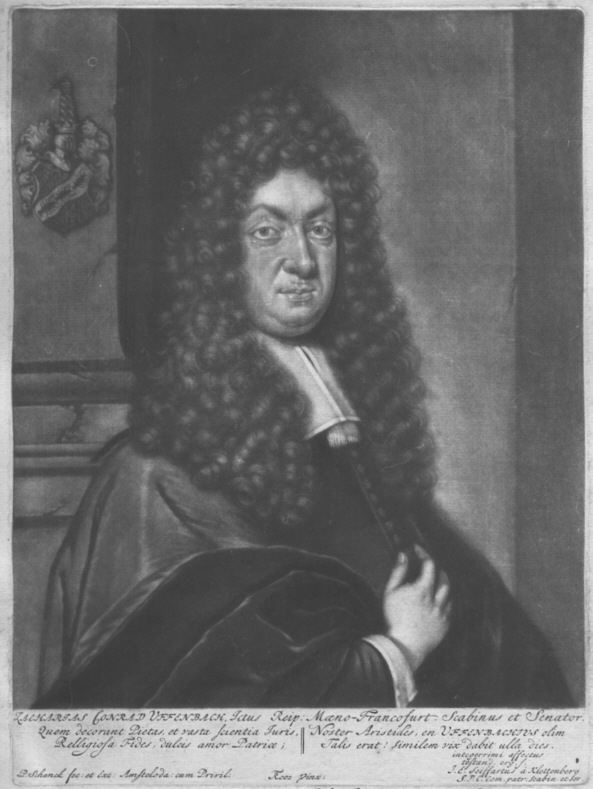
Zacharias Conrad von Uffenbach

Zacharias Conrad von Uffenbach (22 February 1683 – 6 January 1734) was a German scholar, bibliophile, book-collector, traveller, palaeographer, and consul in Frankfurt am Main who is best known today for his published travelogues.

== Biography ==
He was born in lawyer's family. His younger brother Johann Friedrich von Uffenbach accompanied him on his travels.

Uffenbach described 18th-century curiosity cabinets and scientific collections that later became the basis for museums, such as the private collection of Hans Sloane, that later was absorbed into what today is the British Museum. In 1710 he visited Cambridge and Oxford to examine manuscripts in University libraries, as well as the Repository of the Royal Society in London. While in England he made detailed catalogues of all the books contained in the Peterhouse Library of Cambridge University.

His Merkwürdige Reisen durch Niedersachsen, Holland und Engelland was published in 1753 (after his death) and related his travels during the years 1709-1711 through the towns Hassel (Bergen), Goslar, Clausthal-Zellerfeld, Blankenburg, Quedlinburg, Halberstadt, Magdeburg, Helmstadt, Braunschweig, Wolfenbuttel, Salzdahlum, Hildesheim, Hannover, Herrenhausen, Zelle, Lüneburg, Rakeburg, Lübeck, Hamburg, Stade, Bremen, Emden, Groningen, Leeuwarden, Franeker, Harlingen, Bolsward, Zwolle, Deventer, Harderwijk, Amersfoort, Utrecht, Amsterdam, Leiden, Rotterdam, Delft, The Hague, Haarlem, London, Greenwich, Cambridge, Oxford, Hampton Court, Kensington, Woodstock, Richmond, London, Düsseldorf, and Cologne. In the Netherlands he met with Campegius Vitringa, Pieter Burman the Elder, Cornelis van Alkemade, Antonie van Leeuwenhoek, Prosper Marchand, Bernard Picart, Jakob Gronovius, Herman Boerhaave, Johannes Musschenbroeck (father of the scientist Pieter van Musschenbroek), and Frederick Ruysch. In England he met with Hans Sloane.

Uffenbach collected a big collection of oriental manuscripts. In 1711 his library contained about 12.000 books. After his death Johann Christoph Wolf acquired his collection.

== Works ==
- Zacharias Conrad von Uffenbach, Merkwürdige Reisen durch Niedersachsen, Holland und Engelland: Erster Theil (Ulm & Memmingen: Johann Friederich Gaum, 1753) online link.
- Zacharias Conrad von Uffenbach, Merkwürdige Reisen durch Niedersachsen, Holland und Engelland: Zweyter Theil (Ulm: Johann Friederich Gaum, 1753) online link.
- Zacharias Conrad von Uffenbach, Merkwürdige Reisen durch Niedersachsen, Holland und Engelland: Dritter Theil (Ulm /Memmingen: Gaumischen Handlung, 1754) online link.

== See also ==
- Minuscule 101
- Uncial 0121b
