= Minuscule 216 =

- New Testament manuscript
- Text: Acts, Paul
- Date: 1358
- Script: Greek
- Now at: Lambeth Palace
- Size: 25.5 cm by 17.5 cm
- Category: none
- Hand: beautifully written
- Note: many corrections marginalia

Minuscule 216 (in the Gregory-Aland numbering), α 469 (Soden), is a Greek minuscule manuscript of the New Testament, on paper. It is dated by a colophon to the year 1358. It has marginalia.

== Description ==
The codex contains the text of the Acts, Catholic, and Pauline epistles on 236 paper leaves (size 25.5 cm by 17.5 cm), with some lacunae (1 Corinthians 11:7-27; 1 Timothy 4:1-5.8). The text is written in one column per page, 27 lines per page.

The text is divided according to the κεφαλαια (chapters), whose numbers are given at the margin, and their τιτλοι (titles of chapters) at the top of the pages.

It contains prolegomena, journeys of Paul (as in 102, 206, 256, 468, 614, 665, 912), tables of the κεφαλαια (tables of contents) before each book, liturgical book synaxarion, subscriptions at the end of each book, and lectionary equipment at the margin. It is beautifully written, with numerous corrections made by later hand.

According to the subscription at the end of the Epistle to the Romans, the Letter was written προς Ρωμαιους εγραφη απο Κορινθου δια Φοιβης της διακονου; the same subscription have manuscripts: 42, 90, 339, 462, 466, 642;

== Text ==
Kurt Aland the Greek text of the codex did not place in any Category.

In 1 Corinthians 2:14 it reads πνευματος (omit του θεου) along with 2, 255, 330, 440, 451, 823, 1827, and syr^{p}.

== History ==
The manuscript was written by Theophanes. It was examined by Scrivener and C. R. Gregory.

It is currently housed at the Lambeth Palace (1183), at London.

== See also ==
- List of New Testament minuscules
- Biblical manuscript
- Textual criticism
