= Charles de Condren =

French mystic

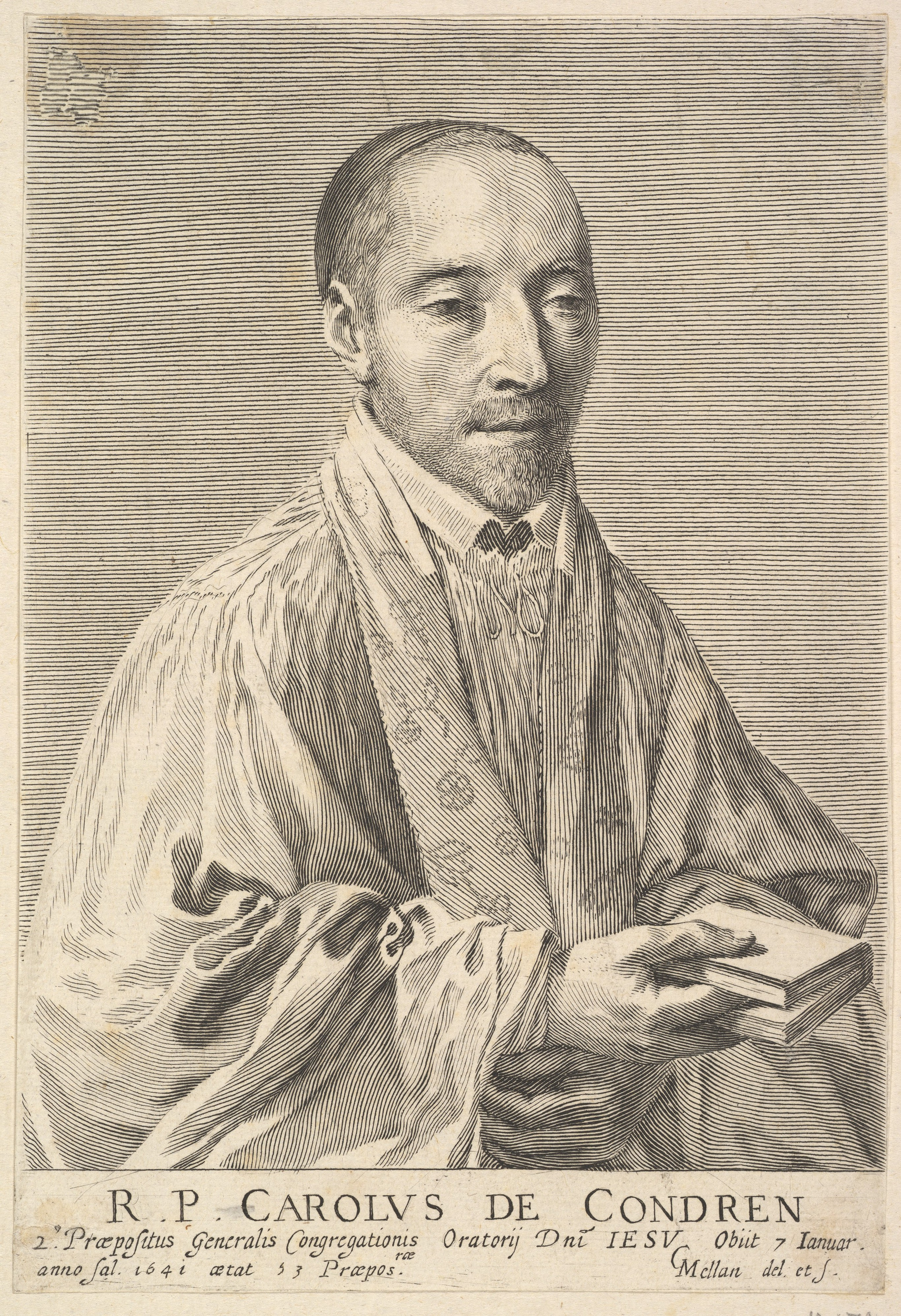
Charles de Condren

Charles de Condren, Cong. Orat. (15 December 1588 – 17 January 1641), was a French Catholic mystic of the 17th century and is considered a leading member of the French School of Spirituality.

== Early life ==
Condren was born on 15 December 1588 in Vauxbuin, near Soissons. His father, governor of the royal castle of Piles near Meaux, had converted from Protestantism to Catholicism. He sought to instill in his son an attraction for military life, and had the boy outfitted with a military uniform when still very young. Charles was tutored by M. Le Masson, a canon of Soissons, and displayed a remarkable memory even at a young age.

Charles had a decisive spiritual experience at the age of eleven and half and decided to become a priest. He studied in the secondary school of Harcourt from 1603 till 1605, but because of an illness returned to his family for several months. His father was still determined that Charles should join the army either at Calais or in Holland, but perceiving the serious of the illness, agreed that should his son recover, he could enter religious life.

== The French Oratory ==
He continued his studies at the Sorbonne and was ordained to the priesthood in 1614, receiving his doctorate from the Sorbonne the next year. He gave up his family inheritance, which by the law of primogeniture was his, and entered the house of the French Oratory founded by the Abbé (later Cardinal) Pierre de Bérulle on the Rue Saint-Honoré in Paris, having thought before that of becoming a Capuchin.

In 1615, Condren participated in the foundation of a new house of the Oratory in Nevers and in 1619 was in Langres for the opening of a seminary, in conformity to the decrees of the Council of Trent. He returned to Paris in 1620 to open a new house of the Oratory in Poitiers and in 1624, one at the former Abbey of St. Magloire, which doubled as a seminary.

In 1625, he returned to the house in the Rue de Saint-Honoré. In 1627, he became the confessor of Prince Gaston of France, (Monsieur), brother of Louis XIII. He brought about a reconciliation between the king and his brother, who had been estranged, on 18 April 1630 in Troyes. Condren also bore the responsibility of being the confessor of Bérulle.

After Bérulle's death in 1629, Condren succeeded him as Superior General of the Oratory. Condren was elected very quickly to avoid intervention by Cardinal Richelieu. The Oratory had 71 houses in 1631, but Condren was discouraged and came near to resigning in 1634. He was also a member of the Compagnie du Saint-Sacrement.

The work Condren had most at heart was the foundation of seminaries after the Counter-Reformation model mandated by the Council of Trent. The Catholic Church felt that its success in its own renewal lay in the thorough and systematic formation of the clergy through their education in these schools. Condren gathered a few young ecclesiastics around him for that purpose. The missions in which he employed them were meant to impress on their minds the religious needs of the country. A disciple of both Vincent de Paul, and Condren, Jean-Jacques Olier took part in "missions" organised by them in France. Condren was Olier's confessor, and counseled him not accept an appointment to a bishopric; instead Olier went on to found the Society of Saint Sulpice whose main purpose was the education of priests.

In 1638 he created the College of Juilly, where, at his death, he was laid to rest in the chapel, next to the tomb of Cardinal Bérulle. His first biography was published in 1643 by a member of the French Oratory, Denis Amelote (reviewed in 1657).

== See also ==
- French school of spirituality
- Nicolas Malebranche
