= Minuscule 462 =

- New Testament manuscript
- Text: Acts, Cath., Pauline epistles
- Date: 13th century
- Script: Greek
- Now at: State Historical Museum
- Size: 24 cm by 19.2 cm
- Category: none
- Hand: carefully written

Minuscule 462 (in the Gregory-Aland numbering), α 359 (in the Soden numbering), is a Greek minuscule manuscript of the New Testament, on a paper. Palaeographically it has been assigned to the 13th century. Formerly it was labelled by 101^{a} and 116^{p}. It was adapted for liturgical use.

== Description ==
The codex contains the text of the Acts of the Apostles, Catholic epistles, and Pauline epistles on 240 paper leaves (24 cm by 19.2 cm). It is carefully written in one column per page, 25 lines per page.

It contains prolegomena, Synaxarion, and scholia to the Acts, and lectionary markings at the margin of the Epistles for liturgical reading. It contains Martyrium Pauli.

The order of books: Acts of the Apostles, Catholic epistles, and Pauline epistles.

Kurt Aland did not place the Greek text of the codex in any Category.

According to the subscription at the end of the Epistle to the Romans, the Letter was written προς Ρωμαιους εγραφη απο Κορινθου δια Φοιβης της διακονου; the same subscription have manuscripts: 42, 90, 216, 339, 466, 642;

== History ==
It is dated by the INTF to the 13th century.

Formerly it was labelled by 101^{a} and 116^{p}. In 1908 Gregory gave the number 462 to it.

The manuscript was examined by Matthaei and Treu. It is currently housed at the State Historical Museum (V. 24, S. 346) in Moscow.

== See also ==
- List of New Testament minuscules
- Biblical manuscript
- Textual criticism
- Minuscule 461
- Minuscule 464
