= Stadtarchiv Frankfurt (Oder) =

Coordinates: 52.3492°N 14.5521°E

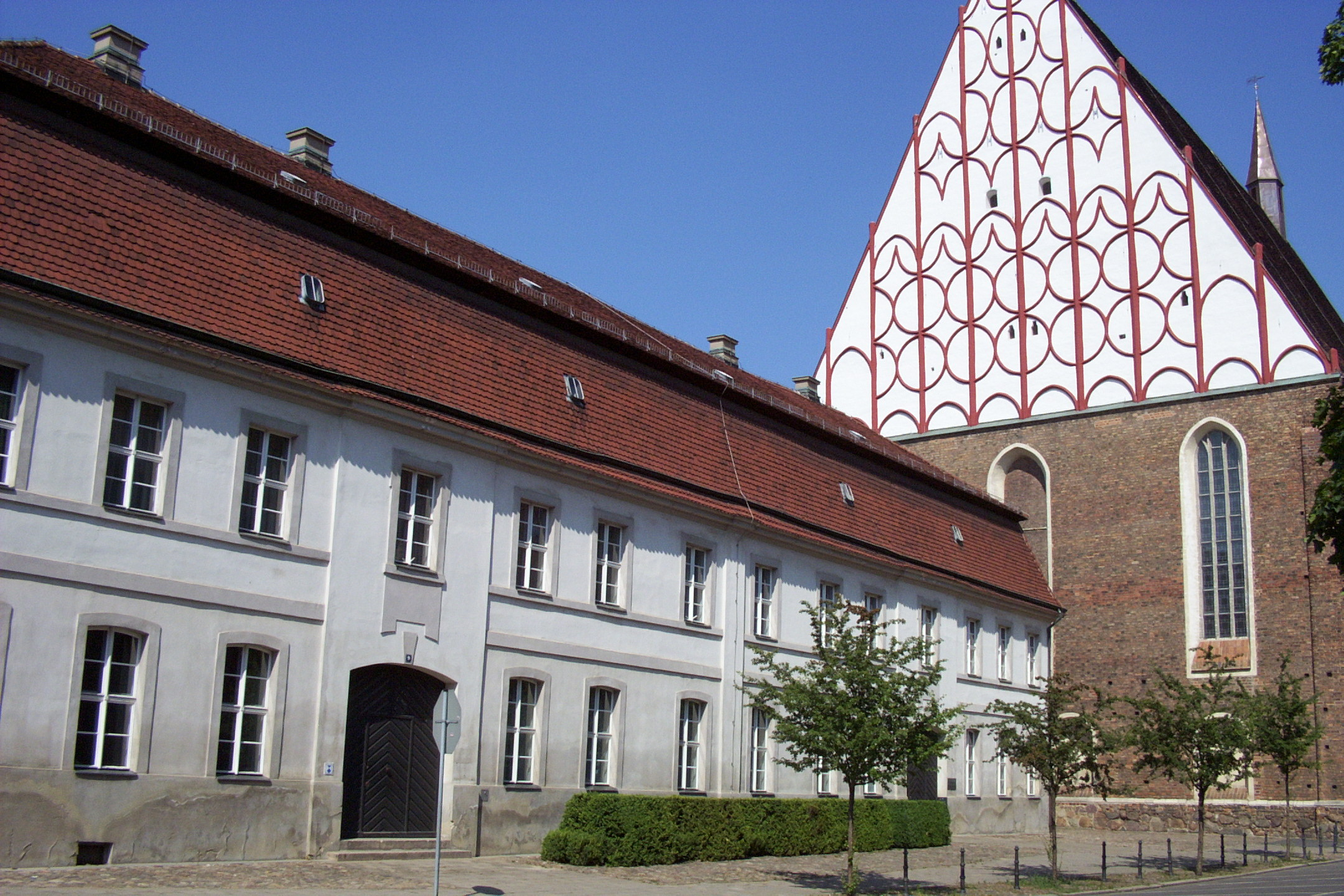
Stadtarchiv (2006)

The Stadtarchiv Frankfurt (Oder), (German: City Archives of Frankfurt an der Oder), contains the documents with information about the history of the city Frankfurt upon Oder and its citizens from the 13th century to the present day. To the archives belongs: seeds, sources for history research, acts, maps, plans, manuscripts, newspapers, magazines, books, stamps and other materials. The library (built in 1925), part of archives, contains about 16 000 volumes of printed books from 1470–2001, and 34 incunabula printed before 1470 in Frankfurt. Most of them by Viadrina University of Frankfurt.
