= Artemidorus Ephesius =

Ancient Greek geographer

Artemidorus of Ephesus
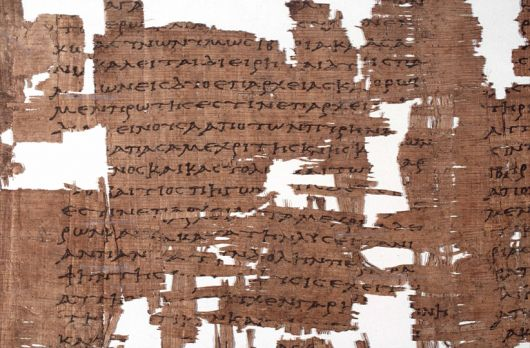
- Artemidorus papyrus
- Born: fl. 100 BC; Ephesus (modern-day Selçuk, İzmir, Turkey)
- Scientific career
- Fields: Geography

Artemidorus of Ephesus (Ancient Greek: Ἀρτεμίδωρος ὁ Ἐφέσιος; Latin: Artemidorus Ephesius) was a Greek geographer, who flourished around 100 BC. His work in eleven books is often quoted by Strabo. What is thought to be a possible fragment of his work is considered by some scholars to be a forgery.

== Biography ==
Artemidorus of Ephesus wrote around 100 BC a geographical treatise presumably composed of eleven books, as such the longest work on the topic to date. The work is now mostly known though citations from Strabo (early 1st c. AD) and Pliny (1st c. AD), supplemented by Stephanus of Byzantium (6th c. AD). Artemidorus seems to have been seen in opposition to Eratosthenes, possibly attempting to update the work of the earlier scholar by providing much greater detail.

== The Artemidorus papyrus ==
In 1998, the discovery of a papyrus thought to contain book 2 of Artemidorus' Geography was announced; the editio princeps was published in 2008. It is known as the Artemidorus papyrus; it also contains the first map of the Iberian Peninsula, and many illustrations.

This 10-foot (3.0 m) long papyrus roll was presumed to have been written in the first century BC, maybe in Alexandria. It was believed that the copyist left spaces for illustrations of maps, for it to be sent to a painter's workshop to have them inserted. However, the painter designed only a partial map, which appears to be what the author believed was the shape of the southwestern Iberian peninsula.

The map is incomplete and has no names, and is perhaps the wrong map for the space in the papyrus. This ruined the roll. Instead the blank spaces were used as scrap papyrus for rough drafts, and to keep a catalog of drawings for clients. The drawings include pictures of real animals, such as giraffes, tigers and pelicans, as well as mythical ones, such as the griffin, marine snake, or a dog with wings. In addition, pictures of heads, feet and hands were drawn until there were no blank spaces.

The papyrus was then presumably sold as scrap paper. It was found in the early 1900s in the form of cartonnage (Konvolut), as a filling for some kind of cavity. The cartonnage was sold to an Egyptian collector in whose hands it remained for fifty years. It then travelled around Europe, before being bought by a German collector who opened it and discovered the remains of the papyrus roll. It has holes in it, but because it got damp at some stage, even when there are holes, the drawings on those parts of the papyrus have been mirrored on the facing part of the roll.

The papyrus – which was bought by an Italian private foundation for 2,750,000 euros in 2004 – is now owned by Turin's Banco di San Paolo.

A 2007 study by Luciano Canfora asserts that the text of the papyrus cannot be by Artemidorus as it contains words not available except in Byzantine Greek, and that the papyrus may be a forgery, perhaps by Constantine Simonides. Richard Janko, in Classical Review 59.2 (2009) pp. 403–410 has offered additional arguments on linguistic, palaeographical, and artistic grounds favoring the case for a forgery by Simonides. Many other established philologists have presented a large amount of evidence and arguments against Canfora’s hypothesis and, in general, in favour of the antiquity of the text: for example Giambattista D'Alessio, Jürgen Hammerstaedt, Peter Parsons. Since the text of the papyrus contains pieces of information that were unknown before the 20th century, "the identification of this papyrus as a forgery by Constantine Simonides involves a great deal of altogether fantastic ad hoc hypothetical constructions that, far from providing a more economical explanation of the evidence, force their advocates into more and more implausible fictions". D'Alessio concludes that "hypothetical forger(s), moreover, should have been endowed with such a range of scholarly, scientific competences and practical skills as to make this hypothesis far less economical than the most obvious dating of the writing of the text to the same period of the papyrus itself, i.e., roughly, between the late 1st century BCE and the late 1st century CE".

On 20 July 2016, following a report submitted by Canfora on 28 October 2013, the Turin Public Prosecutor's Office initiated preliminary investigations into the allegation of fraud. On 29 November 2018, the Turin Public Prosecutor's Office requested the dismissal of criminal charges against the antique dealer Serop Simonian who sold the papyrus in 2004. Solely on the basis of circumstantial evidence —page 33 of the investigative report (in Italian): "quanto meno sulla base di elementi indiziari gravi, precisi e concordanti"— the Prosecutor concluded that the papyrus is a forgery of the 19th century and that Simonian's fraud of 2004 cannot be prosecuted due to the lapse of the prescriptive period, although the Prosecutor's report does not state the antique dealer was aware of the alleged forgery. The investigation was carried out without new scientific tests on the papyrus and without seeking the advice of any other experts in ancient history, archaeology and philology apart from Canfora, as specified in the same investigative report: "Therefore, it is useless to arrange for consultancy, especially since the costs of this could not be justified, considering the statute of limitations".

On 16 June 2019, the results of yet unpublished spectroscopic analyses were announced by the Italian TV program Report, which stated the presence of hexagonal diamond in the ink of the Artemidorus papyrus. Journalist Giulia Presutti and restorer Cecilia Hausmann claimed that "the hexagonal diamond is an element [sic] that is found in nature only in meteoric rock in Sri Lanka or Canada", "consequently, not in Egypt" and "it is an industrial product that appeared more or less in the 19th century". Although presented by classicist Federico Condello as the ultimate evidence of falsity of the papyrus, these claims are unfounded. Hexagonal diamond, another name for lonsdaleite, was first identified in 1967 in samples from Meteor Crater (Arizona). Since then, it has been found in other places where Meteorites struck the Earth, notably in Germany, Russia, Egypt. The technology to artificially produce lonsdaleite —more difficult to produce than Synthetic diamonds— was tested in the second half of the 20th century and in the 21st century.

Following the controversy about its authenticity, the papyrus has been tested with the radiocarbon method, which produced a date between 15 CE and 85 CE with a level of confidence of 68%, and between 40 BCE and 130 CE with a 95.4% level of confidence. The chemical composition of the ink has been analysed and has been found to be consistent with what we know of the ink produced in that time.

== Notes ==
Bibliography

- Roller, Duane W. (2016). "Geography". In Irby, Georgia L. (ed.). A Companion to Science, Technology, and Medicine in Ancient Greece and Rome. Wiley-Blackwell. doi:10.1002/9781118373057. ISBN 978-1-118-37267-8.
