= Wilhelm Friedrich Rinck =

Wilhelm Friedrich Rinck (1793–1854) was a German Protestant priest (from 1814), biblical scholar and palaeographer. Rinck collated manuscripts housed at the Marcian Library: Minuscule 205, 205^{abs} (now recognized as 2886), 209, 460, 1923, 1924, 1925, and Lectionary 34.

== Works ==
- Das Sendscreiben der Korinther an den Apostle Paulus und das dritte sendscreiben Pauli an die Korinther (Heidelberg 1823)
- Lucubratio critica in Acta Apostolorum, Epistolas catholicas et Paulinas, Sumtu Fel. Schneideri: Basilae 1830.
- Apokalyptische Forschungen, oder: Grundriss der Offenbarung Johannis und Anleitung zu ihrem Vesrtändniss (Zürich 1853)
- Die Religion der Hellenen: Aus den Mythen, den Lehren der Philosophen und dem Kultus (Zürich 1853) Volume 1
- Die Religion der Hellenen (1853)
- Jahrbücher für classische Philologie. Teubner, Leipzig 1860
