= Minuscule 908 =

- New Testament manuscript
- Text: Gospels
- Date: 13th century
- Script: Greek
- Now at: Mount Athos
- Size: 21.2 cm by 14.5 cm
- Type: ?
- Category: none
- Note: marginalia

Minuscule 908 (in the Gregory-Aland numbering), ε1251 (von Soden), is a 13th-century Greek minuscule manuscript of the New Testament on parchment. The manuscript has survived in complete condition. It has liturgical books and marginalia.

== Description ==
The codex contains the text of the four Gospels on 312 parchment leaves (size 21.2 cm by 14.5 cm). The text is written in one column per page, 22 lines per page. The headpieces are ornamented.

The text is divided according to the Ammonian Sections, but without references to the Eusebian Canons.

It also contains Argumentum (i.e. explanation of using Eusebian Canons), tables of the κεφαλαια (tables of contents), lectionary markings at the margin (for liturgical use), liturgical books with hagiographies: Synaxarion and Menologion.

== Text ==
The Greek text of the codex Kurt Aland did not place it in any Category. It was not examined by the Claremont Profile Method. In result its textual character is unknown.

== History ==
C. R. Gregory dated the manuscript to the 13th century. Currently the manuscript is dated by the INTF to the 13th century. It was held at the Athos monastery (St. Andrew Θ'). C. R. Gregory saw it in 1886.

The manuscript was added to the list of New Testament manuscripts by Gregory (908^{e}). It was not on the Scrivener's list, but it was added to his list by Edward Miller in the 4th edition of A Plain Introduction to the Criticism of the New Testament.

Currently it is housed in the St Andrew Monastery (4), at Mount Athos.

== See also ==
- List of New Testament minuscules
- Minuscule 907
- Biblical manuscript
- Textual criticism
