= Minuscule 618 =

- New Testament manuscript
- Text: Acts, Catholic epistles, Paul†
- Date: 12th century
- Script: Greek
- Now at: Biblioteca Estense
- Size: 18 cm by 13.8 cm
- Type: Byzantine text-type
- Category: V

Minuscule 618 (in the Gregory-Aland numbering), α 261 (von Soden), is a Greek minuscule manuscript of the New Testament, on parchment. Palaeographically it has been assigned to the 12th century. The manuscript is lacunose. Tischendorf labeled it by 142^{a} and 178^{p}.

== Description ==
The codex contains the text of the Acts of the Apostles, Catholic epistles, Pauline epistles on 292 parchment leaves (size 18 cm by 13.8 cm) with some lacunae. The text is written in one column per page, 21-22 lines per page.

It contains Prolegomena, subscriptions at the end of each book, and numbers of στιχοι.

The order of books: Acts of the Apostles, Catholic epistles, and Pauline epistles. Hebrews is placed after Epistle to Philemon.

== Text ==
The Greek text of the codex is a representative of the Byzantine text-type. Aland placed it in Category V.

According to Scrivener it has valuable text, but with many errors. Its text often resembling codex 460.

== History ==
The manuscript was added to the list of New Testament manuscripts by Johann Martin Augustin Scholz, who slightly examined its text in Book of Acts. C. R. Gregory saw the manuscript in 1886.

Formerly it was labeled by 142^{a} and 178^{p}. In 1908 Gregory gave the number 618 to it.

The manuscript currently is housed at the Biblioteca Estense (G. 243, a.F.1.28. (III B 17)), at Modena.

== See also ==
- List of New Testament minuscules
- Biblical manuscript
- Textual criticism
