= Minuscule 466 =

- New Testament manuscript
- Text: Acts, Cath., Pauline epistles
- Date: 11th century
- Script: Greek
- Now at: Bibliothèque nationale de France
- Size: 25.6 cm by 19.8 cm
- Type: Byzantine text-type
- Category: V

Minuscule 466 (in the Gregory-Aland numbering), α 167 (in the Soden numbering), is a Greek minuscule manuscript of the New Testament, on parchment. Palaeographically it has been assigned to the 11th century. The manuscript is lacunose. Formerly it was labeled by 115^{a} and 135^{p}.

== Description ==
The codex contains the text of the Acts of the Apostles, Catholic epistles, and Pauline epistles on 174 parchment leaves (25.6 cm by 19.8 cm). It begins at Acts 14:27 and ends at 2 Timothy with some lacunae (1 Thess 5:17-28; 2 Thess 1:12-3:4; 1 Timothy 1:1-24; 2:15-3:3; 2 Timothy 2:21-4:22; Tit 2:15-3:15). It is written in one column per page, 27-28 lines per page.

It contains prolegomena, lists of the κεφαλαια (lists of contents) before each sacred books, subscriptions at the end of each book, numbers στιχοι to the Pauline epistles, and some scholia. It has not liturgical notes on the margin.

The order of books: Acts of the Apostles, Catholic epistles, and Pauline epistles.

According to the subscription at the end of the Epistle to the Romans, the Letter was written προς Ρωμαιους εγραφη απο Κορινθου δια Φοιβης της διακονου; the same subscription have manuscripts: 42, 90, 216, 339, 462, 642;

== Text ==
The Greek text of the codex is a representative of the Byzantine text-type. Aland placed it in Category V.

== History ==
The manuscript once belonged to Colbert's collection.

The manuscript was examined and described by Scholz (whole manuscript), Paulin Martin, and C. R. Gregory (1885).

It was added to the list of New Testament manuscripts by Scholz. Formerly it was labeled by 115^{a} and 135^{p}. In 1908 Gregory gave the number 466 to it.

It is currently housed at the Bibliothèque nationale de France (Gr. 58) in Paris.

== See also ==
- List of New Testament minuscules
- Biblical manuscript
- Textual criticism
