= Minuscule 602 =

- New Testament manuscript
- Text: Acts of the Apostles, Pauline epistles †
- Date: 10th century
- Script: Greek
- Now at: Bibliothèque nationale de France
- Size: 20.8 cm by 16 cm
- Type: Byzantine text-type
- Category: V
- Hand: correctly written
- Note: very lacunose

Minuscule 602 (in the Gregory-Aland numbering), α 61 (von Soden), is a Greek minuscule manuscript of the New Testament, on parchment. Palaeographically it has been assigned to the 10th century. The manuscript is very lacunose. Formerly it was labeled by 122^{a} and 143^{p}.

== Description ==
The codex contains the text of the Acts of the Apostles, Catholic epistles, Pauline epistles on 248 parchment leaves (size 20.8 cm by 16 cm), with numerous lacunae (James, Philipians-2 Thess., 2 Timothy-Hebrews). The text is written in one column per page, 17 lines per page.

It contains Prolegomena, the κεφαλαια (chapters), τιτλοι (titles), subscriptions at the end of each book, and στιχοι.

Contents

Acts 13:48-15:22; 15:29-16:36; 17:4-18:26; 20:16-28:17; 1 Peter 2:20-3:2; 3:17-5:14; 2 Peter 1:1-3.18; 1 John 1:1-3:5; 3:21-5:9; 2 John 8–13; 3 John 1–10; Jude 7-25; Romans 1:1-4:16; 4:24-7:9; 7:18-16:24; 1 Cor 1:1-28; 2:13-8:1; 9:6-14:2; 14:10-16:24; 2 Cor 1:1-13:13; Gal 1:1-10; 2:4-6:18; Eph 1:1-18; 1 Ti 1:14-5:5.

== Text ==
The Greek text of the codex is a representative of the Byzantine text-type. Aland placed it in Category V.

== History ==
The manuscript was added to the list of New Testament manuscripts by Johann Martin Augustin Scholz. It was examined and described by Paulin Martin. Gregory saw the manuscript in 1885.

The manuscript currently is housed at the Bibliothèque nationale de France (Gr. 105), at Paris.

== See also ==
- List of New Testament minuscules
- Biblical manuscript
- Textual criticism
