= Minuscule 605 =

- New Testament manuscript
- Text: Acts of the Apostles, Pauline epistles
- Date: 10th century
- Script: Greek
- Now at: Bibliothèque nationale de France
- Size: 33 cm by 23 cm
- Type: Byzantine text-type
- Category: V

Minuscule 605 (in the Gregory-Aland numbering), O ^{5} (von Soden), is a Greek minuscule manuscript of the New Testament, on parchment. Palaeographically it has been assigned to the 10th century. The manuscript has complex contents. Formerly it was labeled by 126^{a} and 153^{p}.

== Description ==
The codex contains the text of the Acts of the Apostles, Catholic epistles, Pauline epistles on 394 parchment leaves (size 33 cm by 23 cm). The text is written in two columns per page, 21 lines per page. The biblical text is surrounded by a catena.

It contains Prolegomena, tables of the κεφαλαια before each book, the κεφαλαια (chapters) at the margin, τιτλοι (titles), subscriptions at the end of each book, and numbers of στιχοι.

The order of books: Acts, Catholic, and Pauline epistles. Epistle to the Hebrews is placed after Epistle to Philemon.

== Text ==
The Greek text of the codex is a representative of the Byzantine text-type. Aland placed it in Category V.

== History ==
The manuscript belonged to the Medicis. The manuscript was brought from Constantinople to Paris.

The manuscript was added to the list of New Testament manuscripts by Johann Martin Augustin Scholz. Cramer used the catena to the Second Epistle to the Corinthians. It was examined and described by Paulin Martin. Gregory saw the manuscript in 1885.

The manuscript currently is housed at the Bibliothèque nationale de France (Gr. 216), at Paris.

== See also ==
- List of New Testament minuscules
- Biblical manuscript
- Textual criticism
