= Minuscule 469 =

- New Testament manuscript
- Text: New Testament (except Gospels)
- Date: 13th century
- Script: Greek
- Now at: Bibliothèque nationale de France
- Size: 23.5 cm by 17 cm
- Type: Byzantine text-type
- Category: V
- Note: marginalia

Minuscule 469 (in the Gregory-Aland numbering), α 306 (in the Soden numbering), is a Greek minuscule manuscript of the New Testament, on parchment. Palaeographically it has been assigned to the 13th century. It was adapted for liturgical use. Formerly it was labeled by 119^{a}, 139^{p}, and 56^{r}.

== Description ==
The codex contains the text of the whole New Testament except Gospels on 229 parchment leaves (size 23.5 cm by 17 cm), with only one lacuna (2 Corinthians 1:8-2:4). The text is written in one column per page, 24-25 lines per page.

It contains prolegomena, lectionary markings at the margin for liturgical use, αναγνωσεις (lessons), liturgical book Menologion, subscriptions at the end of each book, with numbers of στιχοι.

The Catholic epistles follow the Pauline epistles.

== Text ==
The Greek text of the codex is a representative of the Byzantine text-type. Aland placed it in Category V.

== History ==
The manuscript was dated by F. H. A. Scrivener to the 10th century, but the Apocalypse to the 13th century, C. R. Gregory dated it to the 13th or 14th century. It was dated by the INTF to the 13th century.

The manuscript was slightly examined by Scholz, Reiche and C. R. Gregory (1885). It was the last manuscript added it to the list of New Testament manuscripts by Scholz. It was examined and described by Paulin Martin. Herman C. Hoskier collated its text only for the Book of Revelation.

It was added to the list of New Testament manuscripts by Scholz. Formerly it was labeled by 119^{a}, 139^{p}, and 56^{r}. In 1908 Gregory gave the number 469 to it.

It is currently housed at the Bibliothèque nationale de France (Gr. 102A) in Paris.

== See also ==
- List of New Testament minuscules
- Biblical manuscript
- Textual criticism
