= Minuscule 603 =

- New Testament manuscript
- Text: Acts of the Apostles, Pauline epistles †
- Date: 14th century
- Script: Greek
- Now at: Bibliothèque nationale de France
- Size: 22.1 cm by 16 cm
- Type: Byzantine text-type
- Category: V

Minuscule 603 (in the Gregory-Aland numbering), α 61 (von Soden), is a Greek minuscule manuscript of the New Testament, on paper. Palaeographically it has been assigned to the 14th century. The manuscript is lacunose. Formerly it was labeled by 123^{a} and 144^{p}.

== Description ==
The codex contains the text of the Acts of the Apostles, Catholic epistles, Pauline epistles on 476 paper leaves (size 22.1 cm by 16 cm), with only one lacuna (1 Peter 1:9-2:7). The text is written in one column per page, 29-30 lines per page.

It contains Prolegomena, tables of the κεφαλαια before each book, numbers the κεφαλαια (chapters) at the margin, the τιτλοι (titles) at the top, lectionary markings at the margin, subscriptions at the end of each book, and στιχοι. It has hymns.

== Text ==
The Greek text of the codex is a representative of the Byzantine text-type. Aland placed it in Category V.

== History ==
The manuscript was added to the list of New Testament manuscripts by Johann Martin Augustin Scholz. It was examined by Henri Omont, who dated the manuscript on the 13th century. It was examined and described by Paulin Martin. Gregory saw the manuscript in 1885.

The manuscript currently is housed at the Bibliothèque nationale de France (Gr. 106A), at Paris.

== See also ==
- List of New Testament minuscules
- Biblical manuscript
- Textual criticism
