= Minuscule 241 =

- New Testament manuscript
- Name: Codex Dresdensis
- Text: New Testament
- Date: 11th century
- Script: Greek
- Now at: Saxon State Library
- Size: 22.5 cm by 17 cm
- Type: Alexandrian text-type
- Category: none
- Hand: beautifully written

Minuscule 241 (in the Gregory-Aland numbering), δ 507 (Soden), is a Greek minuscule manuscript of the New Testament, on parchment. Palaeographically it has been assigned to the 11th century. Formerly it was labelled by 241^{e}, 104^{a}, 120^{p}, and 47^{r}.

== Description ==
The codex contains entire the text of the New Testament, on 353 parchment leaves (size 22.5 cm by 17 cm). The text is written in one column per page, 31 lines per page. The order of books is Gospels, Acts, Pauline epistles, Catholic epistles, and Book of Revelation. It is beautifully written.

The text is divided according to the κεφαλαια (chapters), whose numbers are given at the margin, with the τιτλοι (titles of chapters) at the top of the pages.

It contains Prolegomena, tables of the κεφαλαια (tables of contents) before each biblical book, Synaxarion, and Menologion.

== Text ==
The Greek text of the codex is a representative of the Alexandrian text-type. The text contains rare readings. Kurt Aland did not place it in any Category. It was not examined by the Claremont Profile Method.

In 1 John 5:6 it has textual variant δι υδατος και πνευματος together with the manuscripts 43, 463, 945, 1241, 1831, 1877, 1891. (Note: For the other textual variants of this verse see: Textual variants in the First Epistle of John.)

== History ==
The manuscript was bought by Alexius for 52 aspri in 1453 in Constantinople. Pachonius, a monk sent it in 1616, along with other books to the monastery Dochiarii at Mount Athos. It was brought to Moscow, by the monk Arsenius, on the suggestion of the Patriarch Nikon, in the reign of Alexei Mikhailovich Romanov (1645-1676). The manuscript was collated by C. F. Matthaei. In 1788 it was bought for the library in Dresden. It was examined by Matthaei, Tregelles, Gebhardt, and Gregory. Herman C. Hoskier collated its text (only for Apocalypse).

The manuscript came to Dresden at the end of the 18th century and was housed at the Sächsische Landesbibliothek (A 172).

== See also ==
- List of New Testament minuscules
- Biblical manuscript
- Textual criticism
