= Minuscule 909 =

- New Testament manuscript
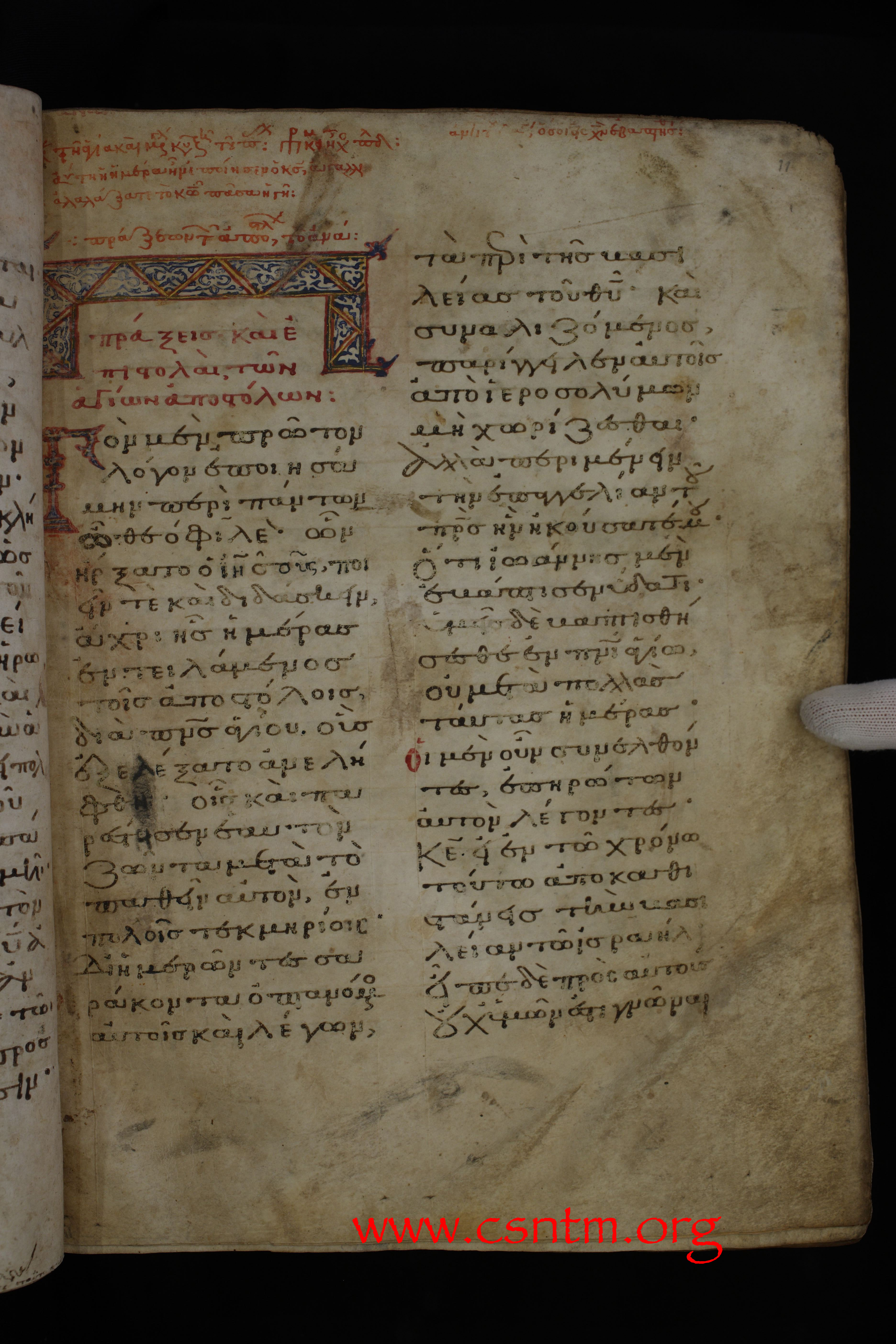
- Folio 11 recto
- Text: New Testament
- Date: 12th century
- Script: Greek
- Now at: Orlando, Florida
- Size: 31.2 cm by 22.8 cm
- Type: ?
- Category: none
- Note: marginalia

Minuscule 909 (in the Gregory-Aland numbering), α263 (von Soden), is a 12th-century Greek minuscule manuscript of the New Testament on parchment. The manuscript has survived in complete condition. It has marginalia.

== Description ==
The codex contains the text of the Book of Acts, Catholic epistles, and Pauline epistles, on 268 parchment leaves (size 31.2 cm by 22.8 cm). According to the CSNTM description it has 271 leaves.

The text is written in two columns per page, 24 lines per page. The leaves 74-80 are written in 25 lines per page. They were written by different hands.

It also contains Prolegomena, Journeys and death of Paul, tables of the κεφαλαια (tables of contents), subscriptions at the end of each of the Gospels with numbers of στιχοι. Lectionary markings at the margin – for liturgical use – were added by later hand. It contains 8 images.

== Text ==
The Greek text of the codex Kurt Aland did not place it in any Category.

== History ==
According to the colophon the manuscript was written in 1108 by Kallistrus, a monk. According to the CSNTM it was written in 1107. Currently the manuscript is dated by the INTF to the 12th century.

In 1554 it belonged to Demetrius. C. R. Gregory saw it in 1883.

The manuscript was added to the list of New Testament manuscripts by Scrivener (198^{a}, 280^{p}) and Gregory (225^{a}, 280^{p}). In 1908 Gregory gave the number 909 to it.

It was held in Cheltenham (Phillipps 7681).

Currently it is housed in the Scriptorium (Van Kampen 902), at Orlando, Florida.

== See also ==
- List of New Testament minuscules
- Minuscule 908
- Biblical manuscript
- Textual criticism
