= Minuscule 912 =

Greek New Testament manuscript

- New Testament manuscript
- Text: New Testament (except the Gospels and Apocalypse)
- Date: 13th century
- Script: Greek
- Now at: British Library
- Size: 33.9 cm by 22 cm
- Type: Byzantine text-type
- Category: V

Minuscule 912 (in the Gregory-Aland numbering), α 366 (von Soden), is a 13th-century Greek minuscule manuscript of the New Testament on parchment.

== Description ==
The codex contains the text of the Book of Acts, Pauline epistles, and Catholic epistles, on 206 parchment leaves (size 33.9 cm by 22 cm).

The text is written in two columns per page, and 31 lines per page.

The text is divided according to chapters (κεφαλαια), whose numbers are given at the margin, and their titles (τιτλοι) at the top of the pages.

It contains Prolegomena, Journeys and death of Paul, liturgical books with hagiographies (Synaxarion and Menologion), subscriptions at the end of each book with numbers of στιχοι.

== Text ==
Kurt Aland the Greek text of the codex placed in Category V. It means it is a representative of the Byzantine text-type.

== History ==
According to Scrivener and C. R. Gregory the manuscript was written in the 13th century. Currently the manuscript is dated by the INTF to the 13th century.

Formerly it was held in the Simonopetra monastery at Athos peninsula. It was brought by Robert Curzon to London in 1837. C. R. Gregory saw it in 1883.

The manuscript was added to the list of New Testament manuscripts by Scrivener (218^{a}, 236^{p}) and Gregory (228^{a}, 283^{p}). In 1908 Gregory gave the number 912 to it.

It is currently housed in the British Library (Add MS 39600) in London.

== See also ==
- List of New Testament minuscules
- Minuscule 911
- Biblical manuscript
- Textual criticism
