= Minuscule 677 =

Manuscript of the New Testament

- New Testament manuscript
- Text: Gospels †
- Date: 13th century
- Script: Greek
- Now at: University of Chicago Library
- Size: 16 cm by 14 cm
- Type: Byzantine text-type
- Category: V

Minuscule 677 (in the Gregory-Aland numbering), ε 353 (von Soden), is a Greek minuscule manuscript of the New Testament, on parchment. Palaeographically it has been assigned to the 13th century. The manuscript is lacunose. Scrivener labelled it by 528^{e}.

== Description ==
The codex contains the text of the four Gospels, on 222 parchment leaves (size 16 cm by 14 cm), with lacunae (Mark 1:1-19; Luke 1:1-18; John 1:1-23). The text is written in one column per page, 25 lines per page.

It contains the Eusebian tables (only one leaf survived). The text is divided according to the κεφαλαια (chapters), whose numerals are given at the margin, and their τιτλοι (titles) at the top. There is also a division according to the Ammonian Sections, but no references to the Eusebian Canons.

It contains Synaxarion and Menologion at the beginning added by a later hand, and much of marginal lectionary markings added by a modern hand.

== Text ==
The Greek text of the codex is a representative of the Byzantine text-type. Hermann von Soden included it to the textual family K^{x}. Kurt Aland placed it in Category V.

According to the Claremont Profile Method it represents the textual family K^{x} in Luke 1, Luke 10, and Luke 20.

== History ==
Scrivener and Gregory dated it to the 13th century. Currently the manuscript is dated by the INTF to the 13th century.

It was examined by Dean Burgon.

The manuscript belong to the book dealer Thorpe. It was acquired along with seven other manuscripts (556, 676, 678, 679, 680, 681, and 682) by the late Sir Thomas Phillips, at Middle Hill in Worcestershire. These manuscripts were in the property of Mr. Fitzroy Fenwick, then at Thirlestaine House in Cheltenham.

Actually the manuscript is housed at the University of Chicago Library (Ms. 232/Goodspeed Gr. 62) in Chicago.

== See also ==
- List of New Testament minuscules
- Biblical manuscript
- Textual criticism
