= Minuscule 556 =

- New Testament manuscript
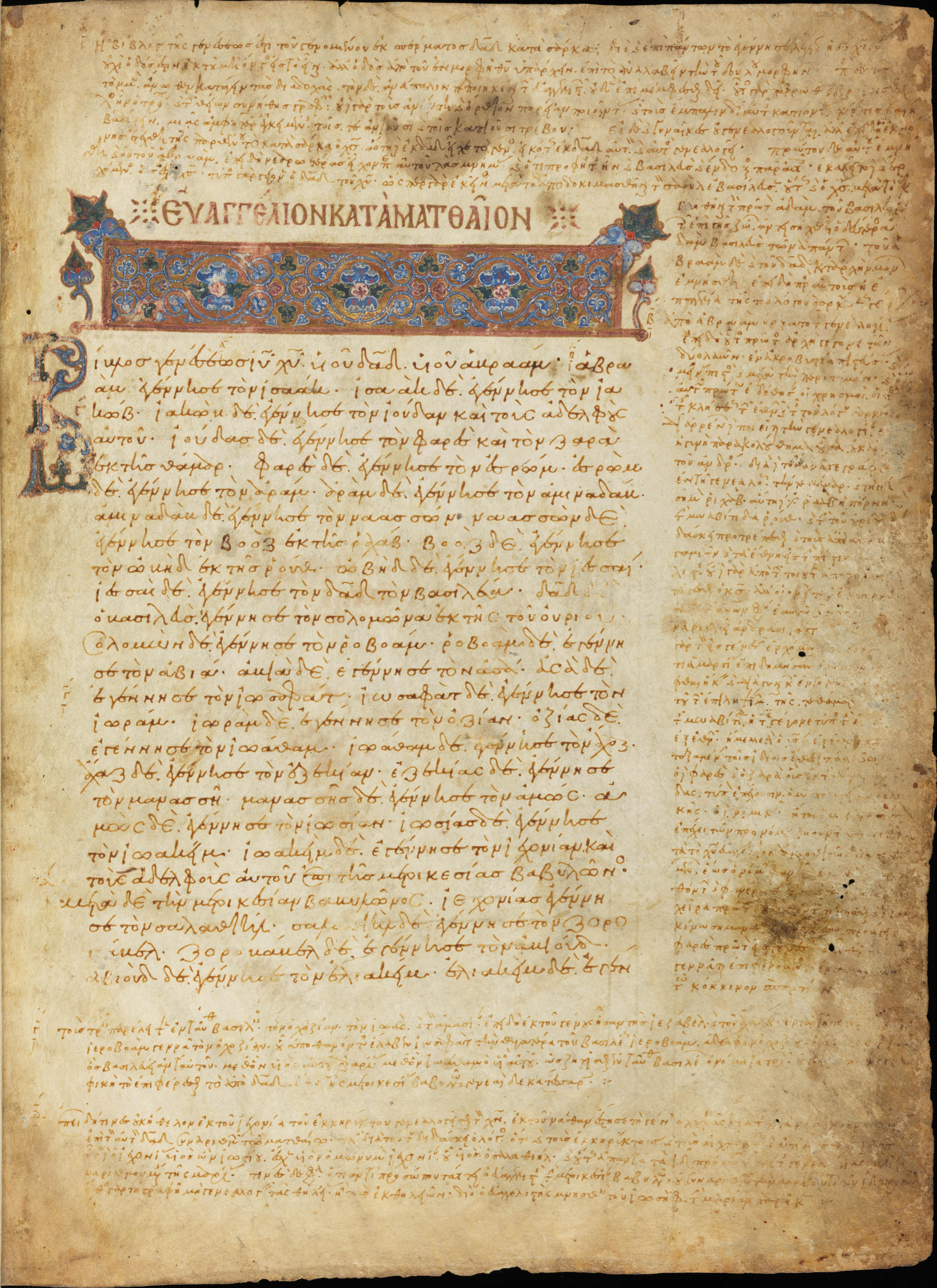
- First page of Matthew, decorated headpiece, biblical text surrounded by a catena
- Text: Gospels
- Date: 12th century
- Script: Greek
- Now at: Bodmer Library
- Size: 32.5 cm by 23 cm
- Type: Byzantine text-type
- Category: V
- Hand: very minute

Minuscule 556 (in the Gregory-Aland numbering), A ^{213} (in the Soden numbering), is a Greek minuscule manuscript of the New Testament, on a parchment. Palaeographically it has been assigned to the 12th century. Scrivener labelled it by number 526.

== Description ==
The codex contains a complete text of the four Gospels on 197 parchment leaves (size 32.5 cm by 23 cm). The writing is in one column per page, 25 lines per page for the text, 61 lines for the commentary, in very minute letters.

The text is divided according to the κεφαλαια and the Ammonian Sections. The numerals of the κεφαλαια are placed at the margin, and their τιτλοι (titles) at the top. There is another divisions according to the Ammonian Sections (in Mark 239 sections – the last in 16:20) with a references to the Eusebian Canons (in gold). It contains liturgical books with hagiographies (Synaxarion and Menologion), and pictures. The headpieces for the Gospels are beautifully illuminated.

The biblical text is surrounded by a catena. It contains the Pericope Adulterae (John 7:53-8:11) but without a commentary.

== Text ==
The Greek text of the codex is a representative of the Byzantine text-type. Aland placed it in Category V. It was not examined by using the Claremont Profile Method.

== History ==
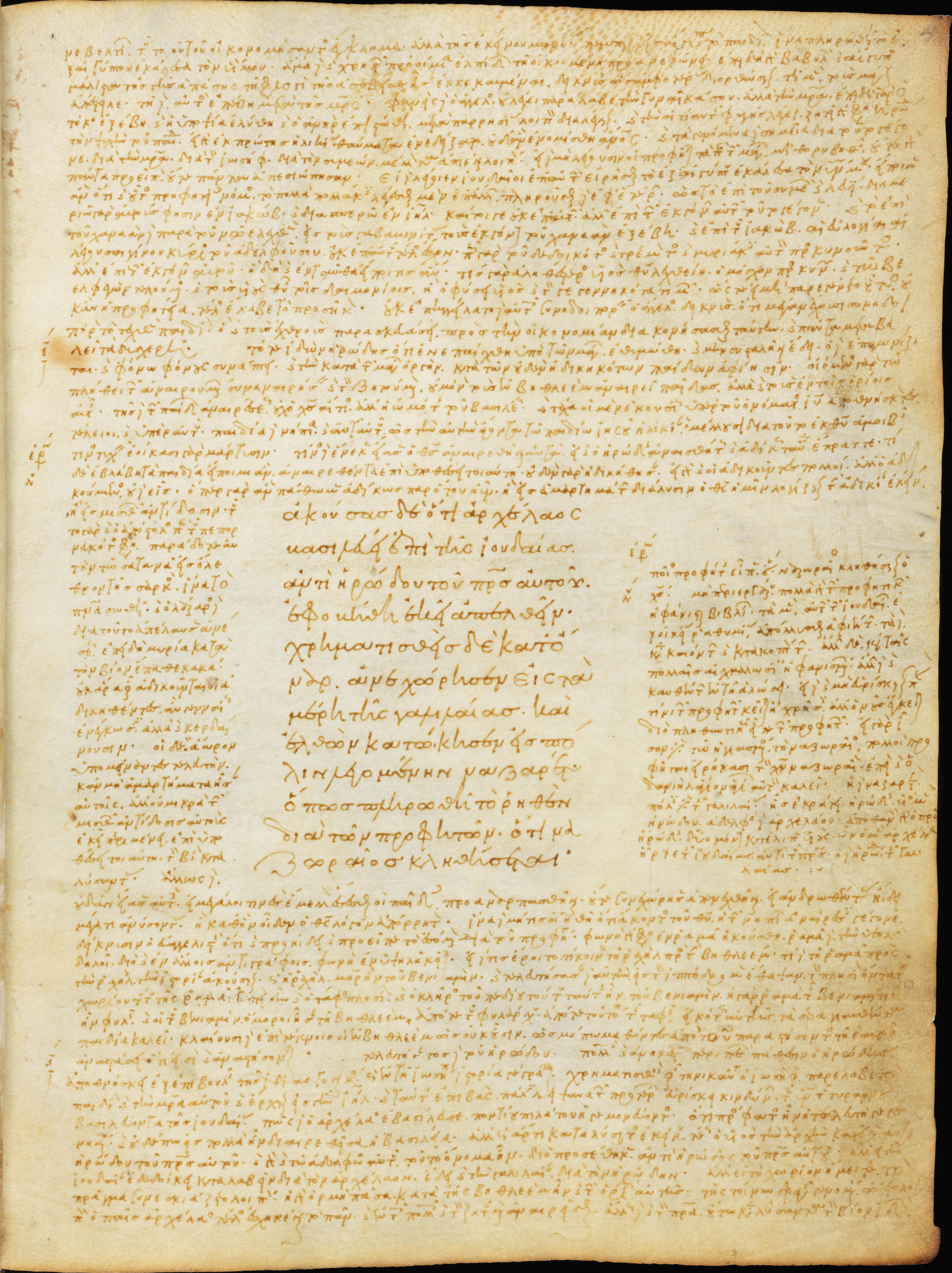
Folio 4 recto

The manuscript was brought along with seven other manuscripts (676, 677, 678, 679, 680, 681, and 682) by the late Sir Thomas Phillips, at Middle Hill in Worcestershire. These manuscripts were in the property of Mr. Fitzroy Fenwick, then at Thirlestaine House in Cheltenham.

The manuscripts was added to the list of the New Testament minuscule manuscripts by F. H. A. Scrivener (526) and C. R. Gregory (556).

The manuscript was examined by Scrivener in 1856, Dean Burgon in 1880, and Herman C. Hoskier in 1886, who quotes some of its readings.

It is currently housed at the Bodmer Library (Cod. Bodmer 25) in Cologny.

== See also ==
- List of New Testament minuscules
- Biblical manuscript
- Textual criticism
