= Minuscule 678 =

- New Testament manuscript
- Text: Gospels
- Date: 12th century
- Script: Greek
- Now at: New Haven, Connecticut
- Size: 27 cm by 20.6 cm
- Type: ?
- Category: none
- Note: beautiful copy

Minuscule 678 (in the Gregory-Aland numbering), ε 273 (von Soden), is a Greek minuscule manuscript of the New Testament, on parchment. Palaeographically it has been assigned to the 12th century. The manuscript has complex contents. Scrivener labelled it by 529^{e}.

== Description ==
A more thorough, accurate description of the manuscript is under preparation (see advance version here). According to the older accounts, the codex contains the text of the four Gospels, on 395 parchment leaves (size 27 cm by 20.6 cm). The text is written in one column per page, 20 lines per page. The text is divided according to the κεφάλαια (chapters), whose numbers are given at the margin, and their τίτλοι (titles) at the top of the pages. The tables of the κεφάλαια are placed before each Gospel. There is also a division according to the Ammonian Sections (in Mark 233), with references to the Eusebian Canons. It contains the Epistula ad Carpianum, and the Eusebian Canon tables at the beginning. Lectionary markings at the margin, incipits, and ἀναγνώσεις (lessons) were added by a later hand. According to Scrivener it is a beautiful copy.

== Text ==
Kurt Aland did not place the Greek text of the codex in any Category.

It was not examined by using the Claremont Profile Method.

== Provenance ==
Scrivener and Gregory dated it to the 11th or 12th century. Currently the manuscript is dated by the INTF to the 12th century. It was added to the list of New Testament manuscripts by Scrivener (529) and Gregory (678) and was examined by Dean Burgon.

The manuscript was acquired along with seven other manuscripts (556, 676, 677, 679, 680, 681, and 682) by the late Sir Thomas Phillips, at Middle Hill in Worcestershire. It was housed at the Connecticut Antiqu. R. Barry (Phillipps 3886) in New Haven, Connecticut. It is now owned by Dumbarton Oaks.

== See also ==
- List of New Testament minuscules
- Biblical manuscript
- Textual criticism
