= Minuscule 679 =

- New Testament manuscript
- Text: Gospels
- Date: 13th century
- Script: Greek
- Now at: J. Paul Getty Museum
- Size: 20.8 cm by 15.3 cm
- Type: Byzantine text-type
- Category: none
- Note: beautiful copy

Minuscule 679 (in the Gregory-Aland numbering), ε 354 (von Soden), is a Greek minuscule manuscript of the New Testament, on parchment. Palaeographically it has been assigned to the 13th century. The manuscript has complex contents. Scrivener labelled it 530^{e}.

== Description ==
The codex contains the text of the four Gospels, on 240 parchment leaves (size 20.8 cm by 15.3 cm). The text is written in one column per page, 25-26 lines per page. The first four lines in Matthew, Mark, and Luke being in gold, with pictures of the four Evangelists and nineteen others.

It contains the Eusebian tables and lists of the κεφαλαια. The Ammonian Sections are incomplete and irregular, without a references to the Eusebian Canons. It has marginal critical notes but no lectionary markings. It contains portraits of the Evangelists and some hagiographic miniatures.

== Text ==
The Greek text of the codex is a representative of the Byzantine text-type. Kurt Aland did not place it in any Category.

According to Wisse's Profile Method it represents textual family Πb in Luke 1, Luke 10, and Luke 20.

== History ==
Scrivener dated the manuscript to the 12th century; Gregory dated it to the 13th century. Currently the manuscript is dated by the INTF to the 13th century.

It was added to the list of New Testament manuscript by Scrivener (530) and Gregory (679). It was examined by Dean Burgon.

The manuscript as acquired along with seven other manuscripts (556, 676, 677, 678, 680, 681, and 682) by the late Sir Thomas Phillips, at Middle Hill in Worcestershire.

Currently the manuscript is housed at the J. Paul Getty Museum (Ludw. II 5 (Phillipps 3887)) in Malibu, California.

== See also ==
- List of New Testament minuscules
- Biblical manuscript
- Textual criticism
