= Minuscule 680 =

Greek minuscule manuscript

- New Testament manuscript
- Text: New Testament
- Date: 14th century
- Script: Greek
- Now at: Yale University Library
- Size: 17 cm by 13 cm
- Type: Byzantine text-type
- Category: V

Minuscule 680 (in the Gregory-Aland numbering), δ 103 (von Soden), is a Greek minuscule manuscript of the New Testament, on parchment. Palaeographically it has been assigned to the 14th century. The manuscript has complex contents. Scrivener labelled it by 531^{e}, 199^{a}, 231^{p}, 104^{r}.

== Description ==
The codex contains entire of the New Testament, on 190 parchment leaves (size 17 cm by 13 cm). The text is written in two columns per page, 41-52 lines per page, in very small letters. The letters are so minute as to require a magnifying glass. The manuscript was written by several different hands.

It contains the Epistula ad Carpianum, Prolegomena, and the Eusebian Canon tables. The text is divided according to the κεφαλαια (chapters) in Greek and Latin, whose numerals are given at the margin, and their τιτλοι (titles) at the top. There is also a division according to the Ammonian Sections, references to the Eusebian Canons at the end of Matthew. It contains lectionary markings, and subscriptions. There are many corrections were made in the margin.

According to Scrivener "this copy has very appearance of having been made from a very ancient codex" (arrangement of the Beatitudes in Matthew 5 in single line, as also the genealogy in Luke 3).

The order of books: Gospels, Acts, Catholic epistles, Pauline epistles (Hebrews precede 1 Timothy), and Apocalypse.

== Text ==
The Greek text of the codex is a representative of the Byzantine text-type. Hermann von Soden included it to the textual family K^{x}. Kurt Aland placed it in Category V.

According to Gregory it has good readings.

According to the Claremont Profile Method it represents the textual family K^{x} in Luke 1, Luke 10, and Luke 20.

== History ==
Scrivener and Gregory dated it to the 11th century. It is presently assigned by the INTF to the 14th century.

The manuscript was acquired along with seven other manuscripts (556, 676, 677, 678, 679, 681, and 682) by the late Sir Thomas Phillips, at Middle Hill in Worcestershire. These manuscripts were in the property of Mr. Fitzroy Fenwick, then at Thirlestaine House in Cheltenham.

The manuscript was added to the list of New Testament manuscripts by Scrivener (531) and Gregory (680).

It was examined by Dean Burgon. The text of the Apocalypse was collated by Herman C. Hoskier.

Actually the manuscript is housed at the Yale University Library (Ms. 248/Phillipps 7682) in Chicago.

== See also ==
- List of New Testament minuscules
- Biblical manuscript
- Textual criticism
