= Minuscule 681 =

- New Testament manuscript
- Text: Gospels
- Date: 13th century
- Script: Greek
- Now at: ?
- Size: 19.3 cm by 14.5 cm
- Type: ?
- Category: none
- Hand: large

Minuscule 681 (in the Gregory-Aland numbering), ε 355 (von Soden), is a Greek minuscule manuscript of the New Testament, on parchment. Palaeographically it has been assigned to the 13th century. The manuscript has complex contents. Scrivener labelled it by 532^{e}.

== Description ==
The codex contains the text of the four Gospels, on 251 parchment leaves (size 19.3 cm by 14.5 cm). The text is written in one column per page, 26 lines per page.

The first page being in gold. It contains the Epistula ad Carpianum (later hand), the Eusebian tables (two different hands), Prolegomena of Cosmas (later hand), numerals of the κεφαλαια (chapters), τιτλοι (titles), the Ammonian Sections (in Mark 234), without references to the Eusebian Canons, lectionary markings (later hand), Synaxarion, Menologion, subscriptions at the end of each Gospel, with numbers of στιχοι, and pictures.

== Text ==
The Greek did not place text of the codex Kurt Aland in any Category.

The manuscript was not examined by using the Claremont Profile Method.

"The text was corrected throughout by an ancient scribe, in a hand bright, clear, and small."

== History ==
Scrivener and Gregory dated the manuscript to the 13th century. Currently the manuscript is dated by the INTF to the 13th century.

It was added to the list of New Testament manuscript by Scrivener (532) and Gregory (681). It was examined by North, Guildford.

The manuscript was acquired along with seven other manuscripts (556, 676, 677, 678, 679, 680, and 682) by the late Sir Thomas Phillips, at Middle Hill in Worcestershire.

Formerly it was housed at the Sotheby's, and it is the last known place of housing of this manuscript. The place of its actual housing is unknown.

== See also ==
- List of New Testament minuscules
- Biblical manuscript
- Textual criticism
