= Minuscule 676 =

- New Testament manuscript
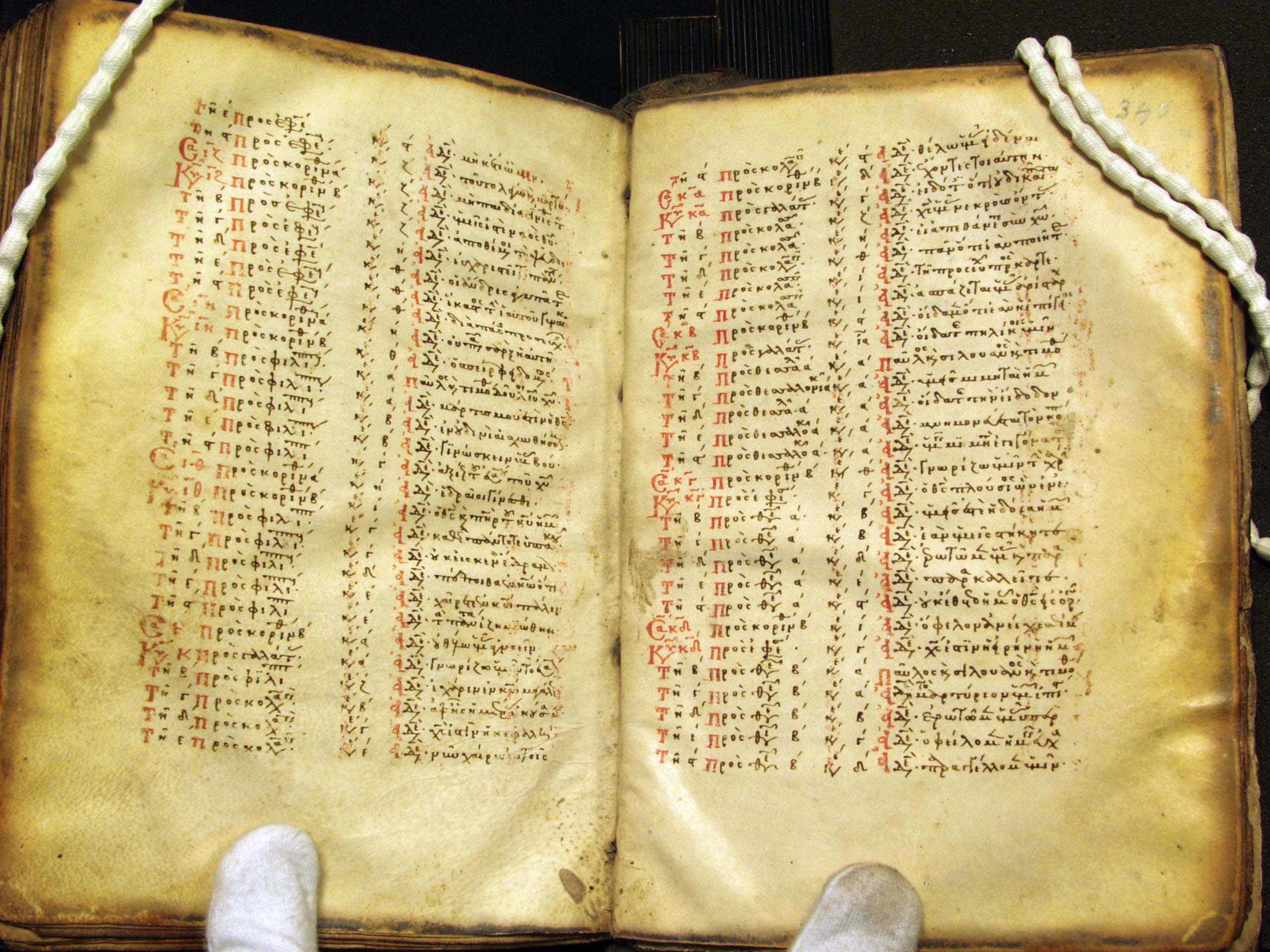
- Text: Gospels, Acts, Paul
- Date: 13th century
- Script: Greek
- Now at: Bible Museum Münster
- Size: 19.6cm by 15cm
- Type: Byzantine text-type
- Category: V

Minuscule 676 (in the Gregory-Aland numbering) α 573 (Soden). It is a Greek minuscule manuscript of the New Testament, on 344 parchment leaves (19.6 cm by 15 cm). It is dated palaeographically to the 13th century. Written in one column per page, 28 lines per page in minuscule letters. It was labelled by Scrivener as 527^{e}.

== Description ==
The codex contains the text of the four Gospels, Book of Acts, Pauline epistles, and catholic epistles, with some lacunae (Matthew 9:36-10:22; Mark 1:21-2:1; John 1:1-22). It contains the tables of the κεφαλαια are placed before every book, lectionary markings, incipits, αναγνωσεις (lessons), Synaxarion, Menologion, subscriptions at the end of books, Euthalian Apparatus, seven illuminations. The Old Testament quotations are marked with inverted comma (>).

It was written by several hands.

== Text ==
The Greek text of the codex is a representative of the Byzantine text-type. Aland placed it in Category V. It was not examined by using the Claremont Profile Method.

== History ==
In 1422 it was held in church of St. George in ελαρανδω (?). The manuscript was bought in 1752 by Nicholas Trimodis. It was held in Ghent.

The manuscript was acquired along with seven other manuscripts (556, 677, 678, 679, 680, 681, and 682) by the late Sir Thomas Phillips, at Middle Hill in Worcestershire. These manuscripts were in the property of Mr. Fitzroy Fenwick, then at Thirlestaine House in Cheltenham.

The manuscript is located now in Bible Museum Münster (Ms. 2).

== See also ==
- List of New Testament minuscules
- Textual criticism
- Bible Museum Münster
