= Minuscule 682 =

- New Testament manuscript
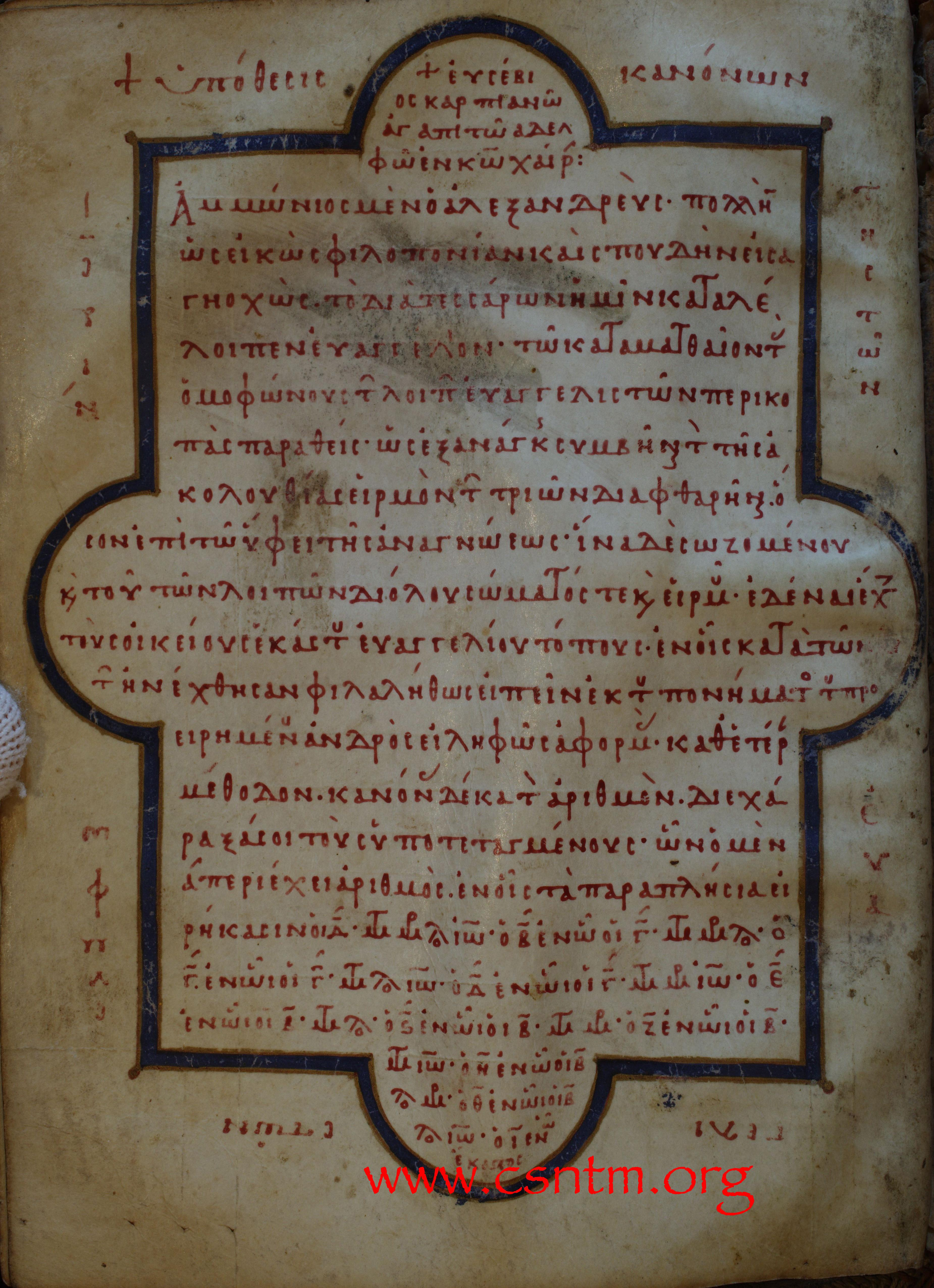
- Hypothesis kanonon
- Text: Gospels
- Date: 11th century
- Script: Greek
- Now at: Orlando, Florida
- Size: 15.4 cm by 12.3 cm
- Type: ?
- Category: none
- Hand: large

Minuscule 682 (in the Gregory-Aland numbering), ε 157 (von Soden), is a Greek minuscule manuscript of the New Testament, on parchment. Palaeographically it has been assigned to the 11th century. The manuscript has complex contents. Scrivener labelled it by 533^{e}.

== Description ==
The codex contains the text of the four Gospels, on 309 parchment leaves (size 15.4 cm by 12.3 cm). The text is written in one column per page, 18 lines per page. The first page being in gold.

The text is divided according to the κεφαλαια (chapters), whose numbers are given at the left margin, and their τιτλοι (titles) at the top. The tables of the κεφαλαια are placed before each Gospel. There is also a division according to the smaller Ammonian Sections (in Mark 233), a references to the Eusebian Canons.

It contains Epistula ad Carpianum, the Eusebian Canon tables, several Prolegomena to the four Gospels, Prolegomena, and subscriptions at the end.

It has unusual marginal note on folio 28 recto.

According to the CSNTM description it has 308 pages.

== Text ==
Kurt Aland did not place it in any Category.

The manuscript was not examined by using the Claremont Profile Method.

== History ==
Scrivener and Gregory dated the manuscript to the 11th century. Currently the manuscript is dated by the INTF to the 11th century.

It was added to the list of New Testament manuscript by Scrivener (533) and Gregory (682). It was examined by Guildford.

The manuscript was acquired along with seven other manuscripts (556, 676, 677, 678, 679, 680, and 681) by the late Sir Thomas Phillips, at Middle Hill in Worcestershire. The manuscript was held in London (Cheltenham 7757). In the 1920s it was transferred to United States.

Actually the manuscript is housed at the Scriptorium (VK 905), Orlando, Florida.

== Gallery ==
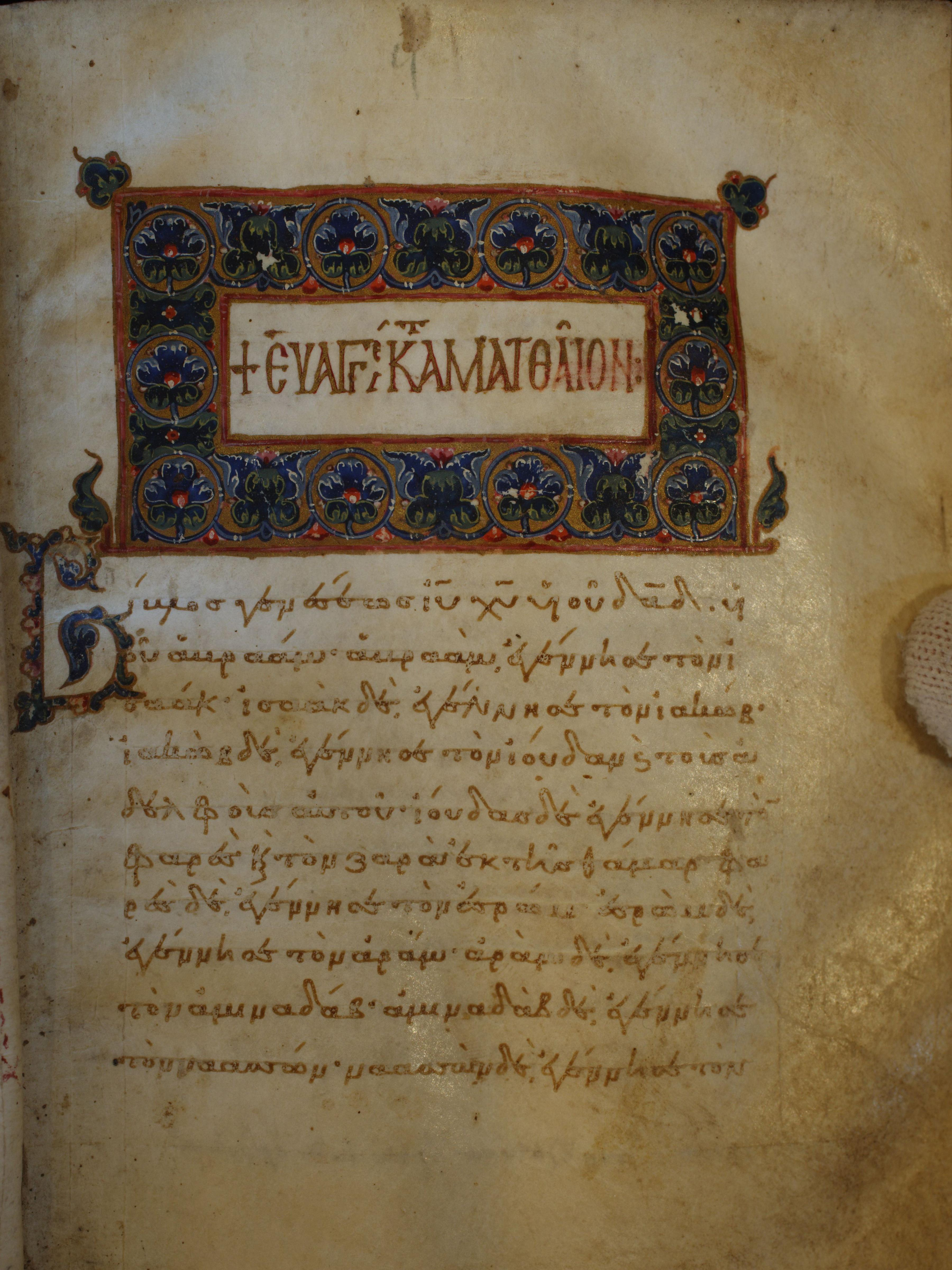
The first page of Matthew

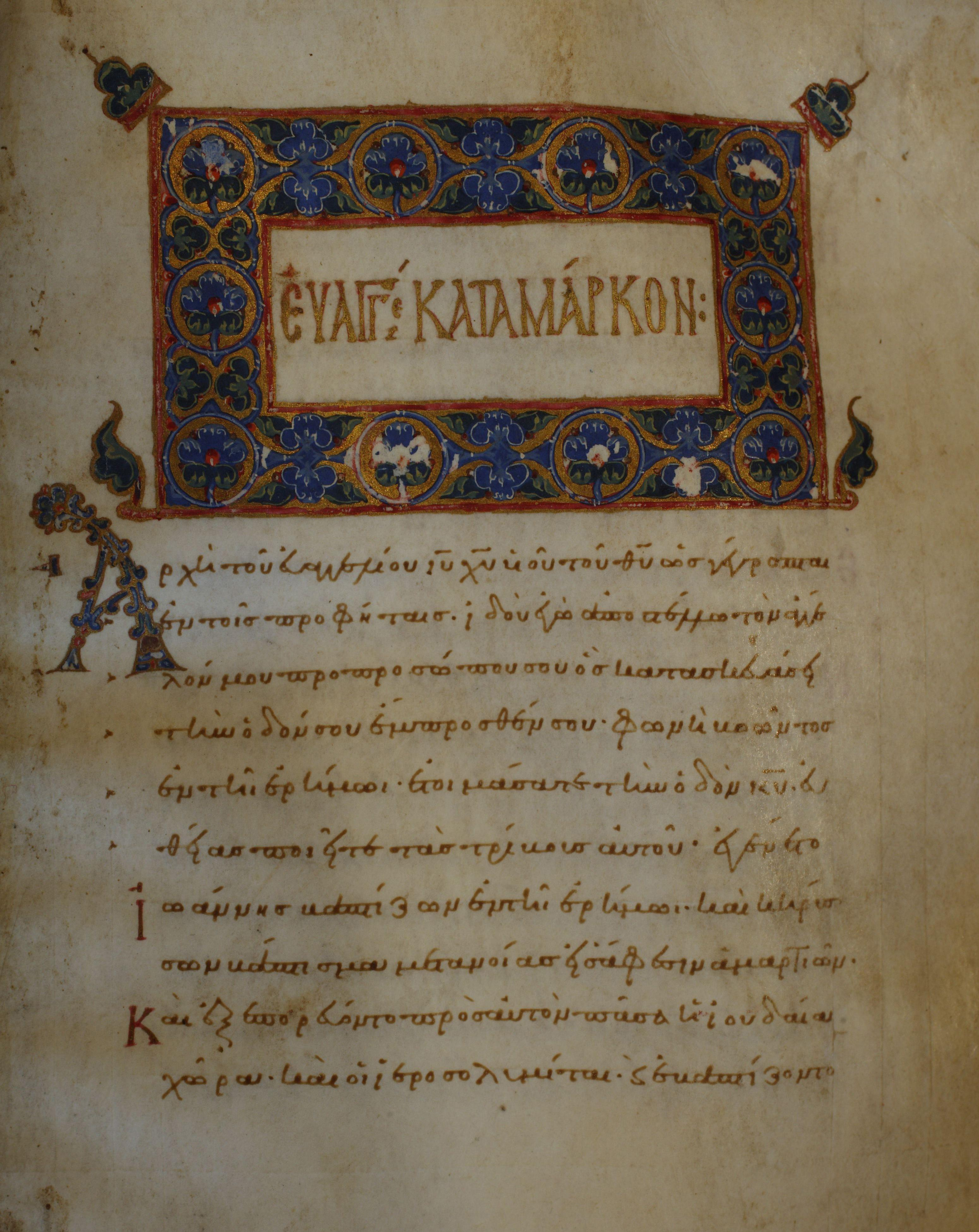
The first page of Mark

== See also ==
- List of New Testament minuscules
- Biblical manuscript
- Textual criticism
