= Portrait of David Wilkie =

Painting by Thomas Phillips

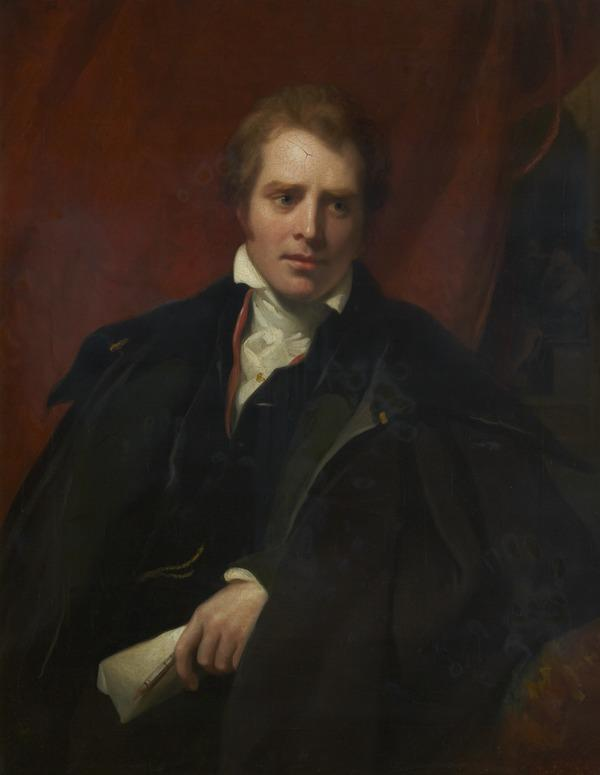
- Artist: Thomas Phillips
- Year: c. 1811
- Type: Oil on canvas, portrait painting
- Dimensions: 99.7 cm × 76.8 cm (39.3 in × 30.2 in)
- Location: Scottish National Portrait Gallery; Edinburgh

Portrait of David Wilkie is an 1811 portrait painting by the English artist Thomas Phillips. It depicts his fellow painter David Wilkie. Both Phillips and the Scottish Wilkie were prominent London-based artists. While Phillips became one of the top portraitists of the fashionable Regency era, Wilkie made his name through genre paintings inspired by the Dutch Old Masters of the seventeenth century.

The painting in a today in the Scottish National Portrait Gallery, having been presented by the Royal Scottish Academy in 1910. Another painting of Wilkie by Phillips now in the Tate Britain is dated 1829 but closely resembles this work.

== Bibliography ==
- Tromans, Nicholas. David Wilkie: The People's Painter. Edinburgh University Press, 2007.
