= Portrait of William Blake =

Painting by Thomas Phillips

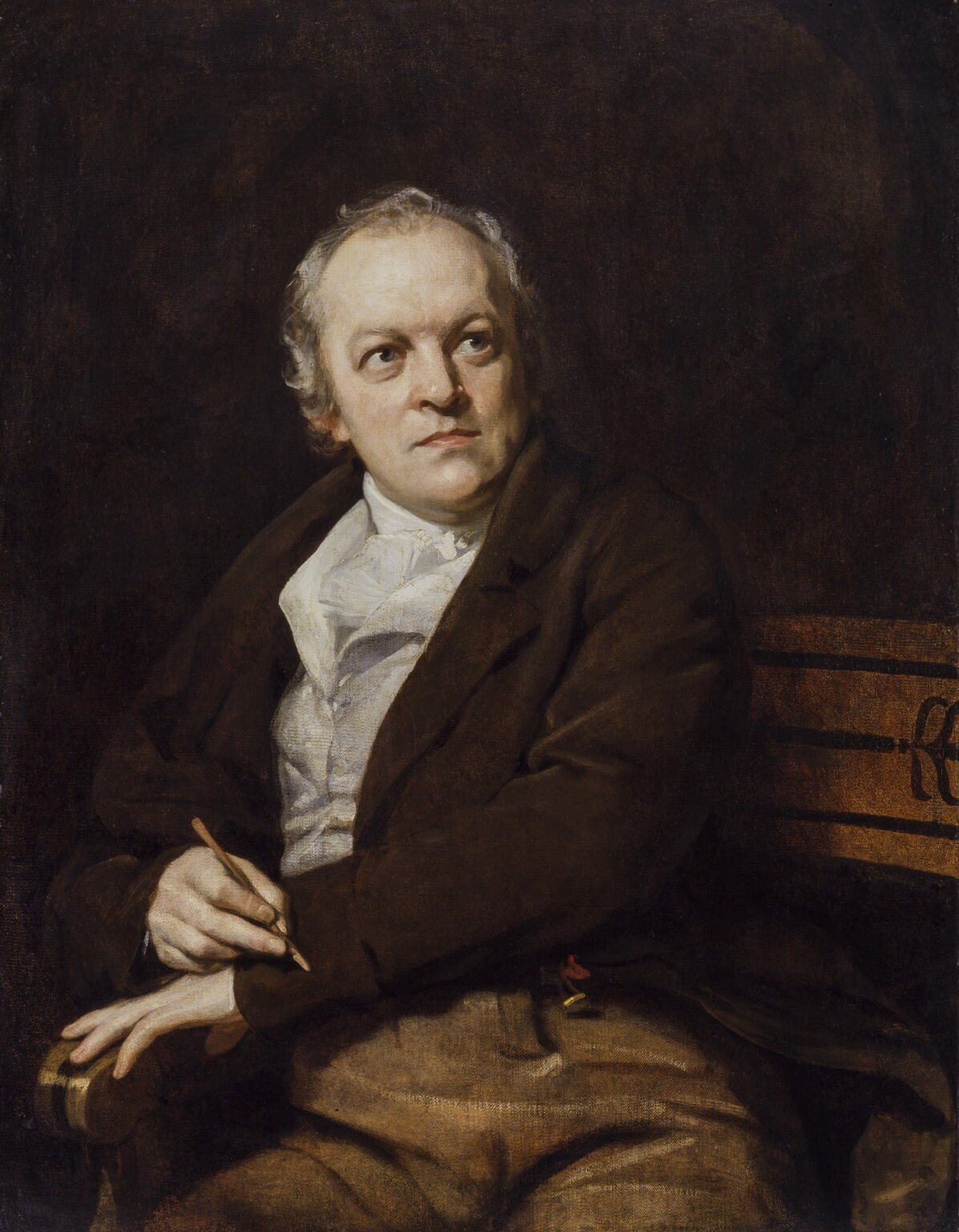
- Artist: Thomas Phillips
- Year: 1807
- Type: Oil on canvas, portrait painting
- Dimensions: 92.1 cm × 70 cm (36.3 in × 28 in)
- Location: National Portrait Gallery; London

Portrait of William Blake is a 1807 portrait painting by the British artist Thomas Phillips. It depicts his fellow artist William Blake. While Thomas Phillips was a fashionable portraitist of the Regency era and member of the Royal Academy, Blake was a more marginal figure at the time, although his works have subsequently become well-known and he is remembered for the poem And did those feet in ancient time, later set to music as the patriotic anthem Jerusalem.

The painting was displayed at the Royal Academy Exhibition of 1807 at Somerset House. The work is now in the collection of the National Portrait Gallery, in London, having been acquired in 1866.

== Bibliography ==
- Myrone, Martin & Concannan, Amy. William Blake. Princeton University Press, 2019.
- Worrall, David. William Blake's Visions: Art, Hallucinations, Synaesthesia. Springer Nature, 2024.
