= Portrait of Lady Caroline Lamb =

Painting by Thomas Phillips

- Artist: Thomas Phillips
- Year: 1813
- Type: Oil on canvas, portrait painting
- Location: Chatsworth House, Derbyshire

Portrait of Lady Caroline Lamb is an oil on canvas portrait painting by the British artist Thomas Phillips, from 1813. It depicts the Anglo-Irish aristocrat and author Lady Caroline Lamb, the wife of the future Prime Minister Lord Melbourne and lover of the poet Lord Byron. Unusually, she is dressed as a page boy carrying a platter of fruit. Phillips also painted Lamb's estranged lover, Lord Byron, twice, including his Lord Byron in Albanian Dress. Today the painting of Lady Caroline is in the collection of Chatsworth House in Derbyshire.

== Bibliography ==
- Douglass, Paul. Lady Caroline Lamb: A Biography. Springer, 2015.
- Eckert, Lindsey. The Limits of Familiarity: Authorship and Romantic Readers. Rutgers University Press, 2022.
- Fraser, Antonia. Lady Caroline Lamb: A Free Spirit. Simon and Schuster, 2023.
- Priestley, John Boynton. The Prince of Pleasure and His Regency, 1811-20. Harper & Row, 1969.
- Shears Jonathon & Rawes, Alan. The Oxford Handbook of Lord Byron. Oxford University Press, 2024.
- Simon, Robin. The Portrait in Britain and America. G.K. Hall, 1987.
