= Thomas Phillips =

English painter (1770–1845)

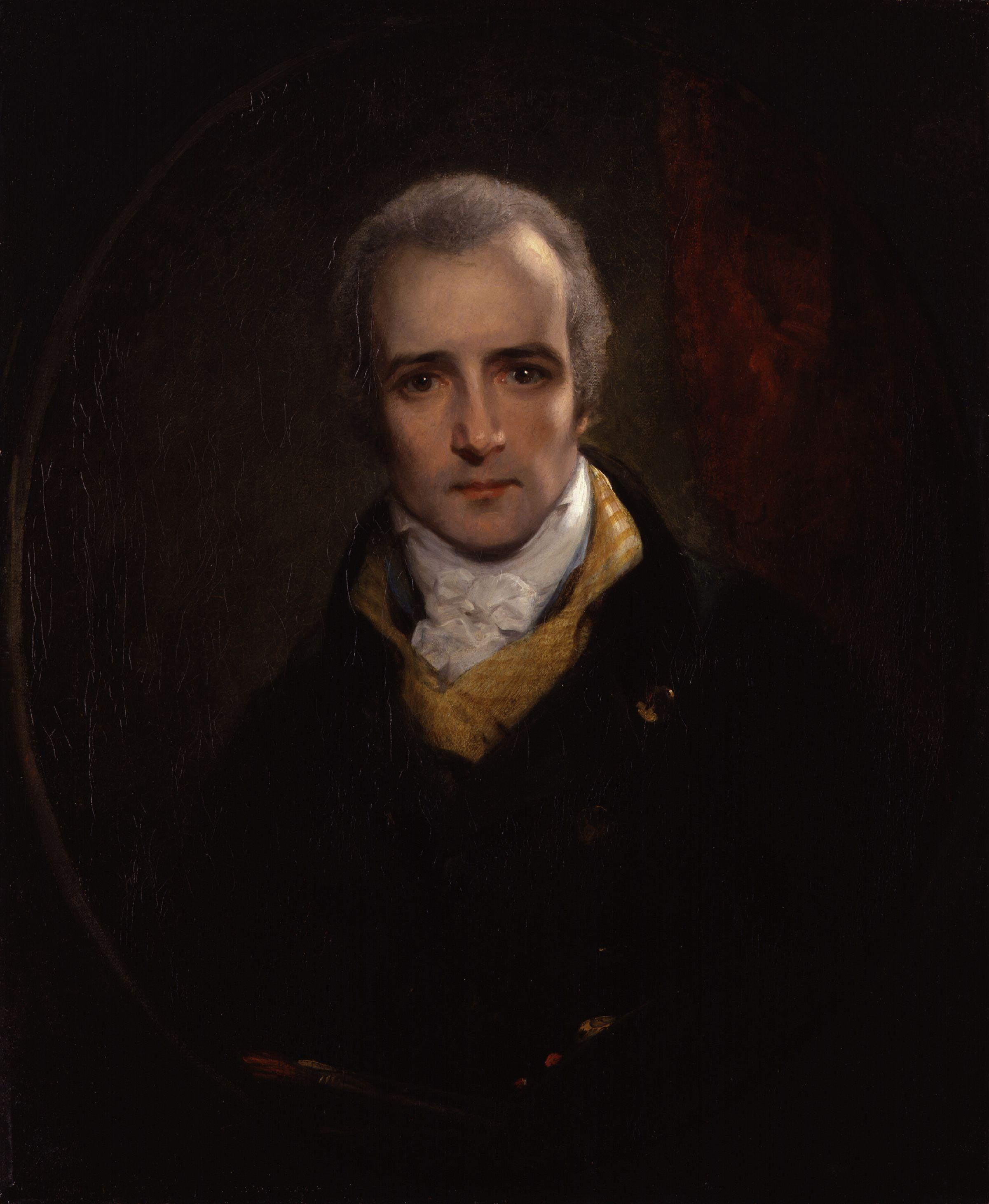
- Self-portrait, c. 1803
- Born: 18 October 1770; Dudley, Worcestershire, England
- Died: 20 April 1845 (aged 74); London, England
- Known for: Painting
- Movement: Romanticism

Thomas Phillips RA (18 October 1770 – 20 April 1845) was an English painter who specialised in portrait painting. He painted many of the notable men of the day including scientists, artists, writers, poets and explorers.

== Life and work ==
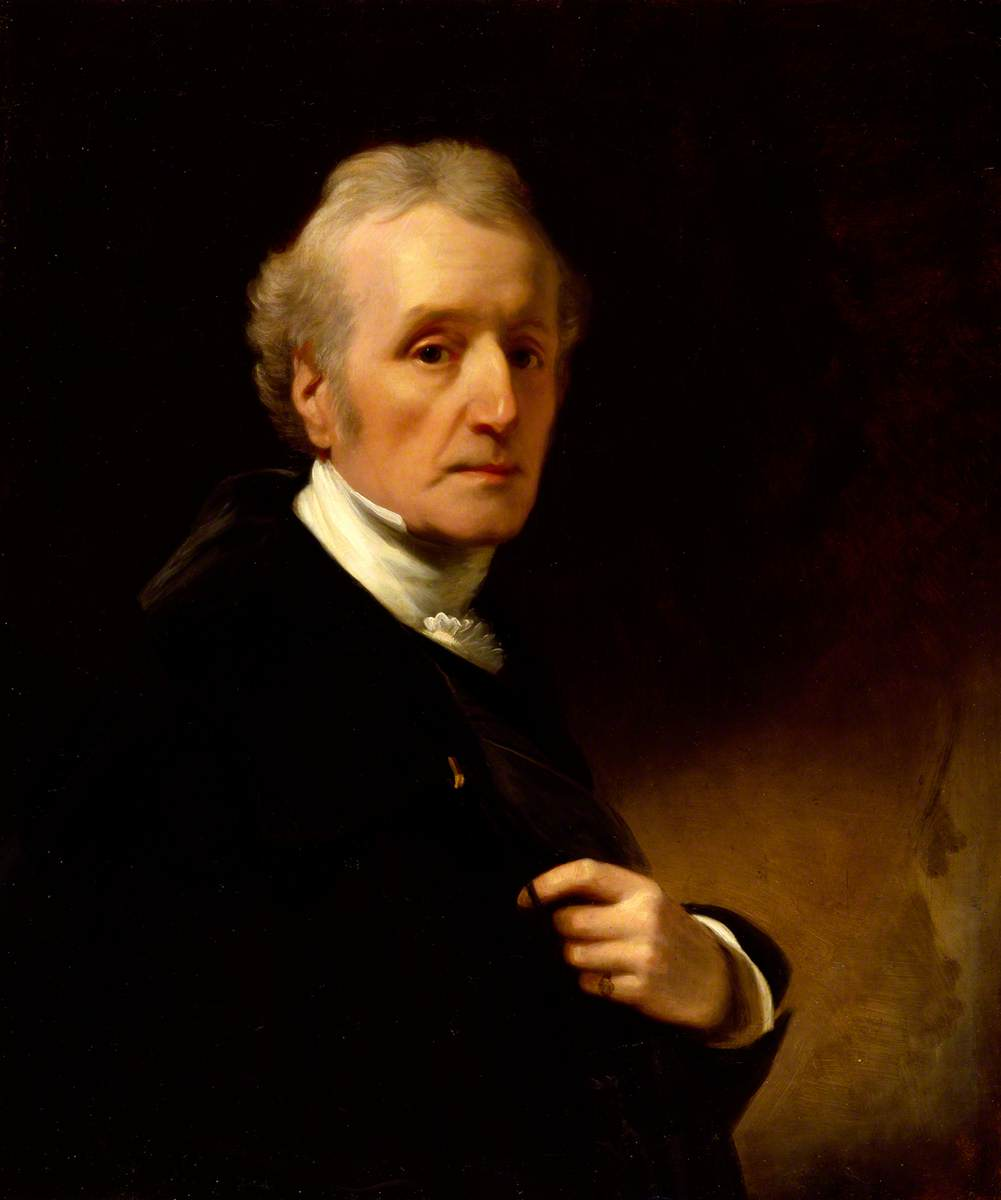
Self-portrait (1820s)

Phillips was born at Dudley, then in Worcestershire. Having learnt glass-painting in Birmingham under Francis Eginton, he visited London in 1790 with an introduction to Benjamin West, who found him employment on the painted-glass windows of St George's Chapel at Windsor. In 1791 he became a student at the Royal Academy, where, in 1792 he exhibited a view of Windsor Castle, followed in the next two years by the Death of Talbot, Earl of Shrewsbury, at the Battle of Castillon, Ruth and Naomi, Elijah restoring the Widow's Son, Cupid disarmed by Euphrosyne, and other pictures.

After 1796, he concentrated on portrait-painting. However, the field was very crowded with the likes of John Hoppner, William Owen, Thomas Lawrence and Martin Archer Shee competing for business; consequently, from 1796 to 1800, his exhibited works were chiefly portraits of gentlemen and ladies, often nameless in the catalogue and of no great importance, historically speaking.

In 1804 he was elected an associate of the Royal Academy, together with his rival, William Owen. About the same time he moved to 8 George Street, Hanover Square, London, formerly the residence of Henry Tresham, R.A., where he lived for the rest of his life. He became a royal academician in 1808, and presented as his diploma work Venus and Adonis (exhibited the same year), perhaps the best of his creative subjects, apart from Expulsion from Paradise. Meanwhile, he rose steadily in public favour, and in 1806, painted the Prince of Wales, the Marchioness of Stafford, the Marquess of Stafford's Family, and Lord Thurlow. In 1807 he sent to the Royal Academy the well-known portrait of William Blake, now in the National Portrait Gallery, London, which was engraved in line by Luigi Schiavonetti, and later etched by William Bell Scott.

His contributions to the academy exhibition of 1809 included a portrait of Sir Joseph Banks (engraved by Niccolo Schiavonetti), and to that of 1814, two portraits of Lord Byron (engraved by Robert Graves). In 1818 he exhibited a portrait of Sir Francis Chantrey, and, in 1819, one of the poet George Crabbe. His 1822 portrait of Sir Charles Asgill was exhibited at the Royal Academy that same year. In 1825 he was elected professor of painting at the Royal Academy, succeeding Henry Fuseli, and, in order to qualify himself for his duties, visited Italy and Rome in company with William Hilton, and also Sir David Wilkie, whom they met in Florence. He resigned the professorship in 1832, and in 1833 published his "Lectures on the History and Principles of Painting".

Phillips also painted portraits of Walter Scott, Robert Southey, George Anthony Legh Keck (1830), Thomas Campbell (poet), Joseph Henry Green, Samuel Taylor Coleridge, Henry Hallam, Mary Somerville, Sir Edward Parry, Sir John Franklin, Dixon Denham, the African traveller, and Hugh Clapperton. Besides these he painted two portraits of Sir David Wilkie, the Duke of York (for the town-hall, Liverpool), Dean William Buckland, Sir Humphry Davy, Samuel Rogers, Michael Faraday (engraved in mezzotint by Henry Cousins), John Dalton, and a head of Napoleon, painted in Paris in 1802, not from actual sittings, but with Empress Joséphine's consent, who afforded him opportunities of observing the First Consul while at dinner. Years later in Paris, he was to portray his younger colleague Ary Scheffer (c. 1835, Musée de la Vie romantique, Paris).

A self-portrait, exhibited in 1844, was one of his last works.

Phillips wrote many occasional essays on the fine arts, especially for Rees's "Cyclopaedia", and also a memoir of William Hogarth for John Nichols's edition of that artist's "Works", 1808–17. He was a fellow of the Royal Society and of the Society of Antiquaries. He was also, with Chantrey, Turner, Robertson, and others, one of the founders of the Artists' General Benevolent Institution.

Phillips died at 8 George Street, Hanover Square, London, on 20 April 1845, and was interred in the burial-ground of St. John's Wood chapel. He married Elizabeth Fraser of Fairfield, near Inverness. They had two daughters and two sons, the elder of whom, Joseph Scott Phillips, became a major in the Bengal artillery, and died at Wimbledon, Surrey, on 18 December 1884, aged 72. His younger son, Henry Wyndham Phillips (1820–1868) was a portrait painter, secretary of the "Artists General Benevolent Institution", and captain in the Artists' volunteer corps.

Artist and illustrator John William Wright (1802–1848) was his pupil.

== Gallery ==
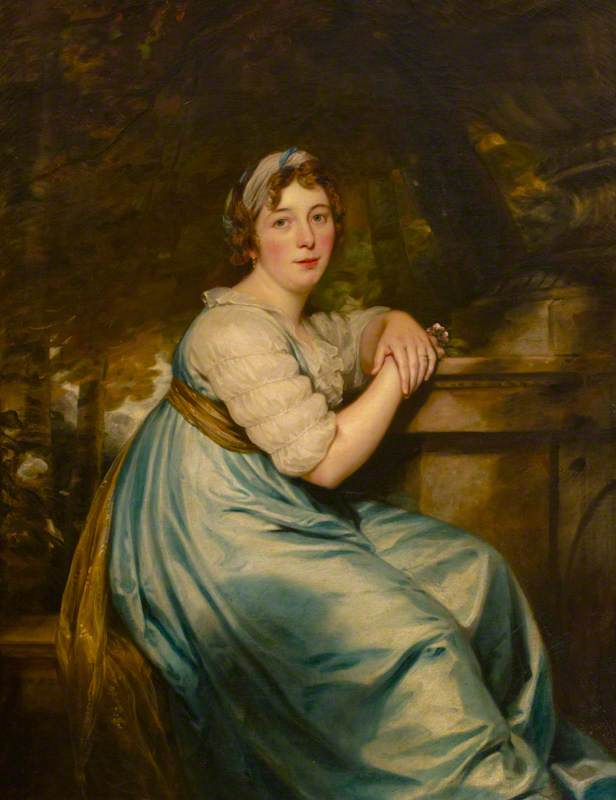
Countess of Egremont, 1797

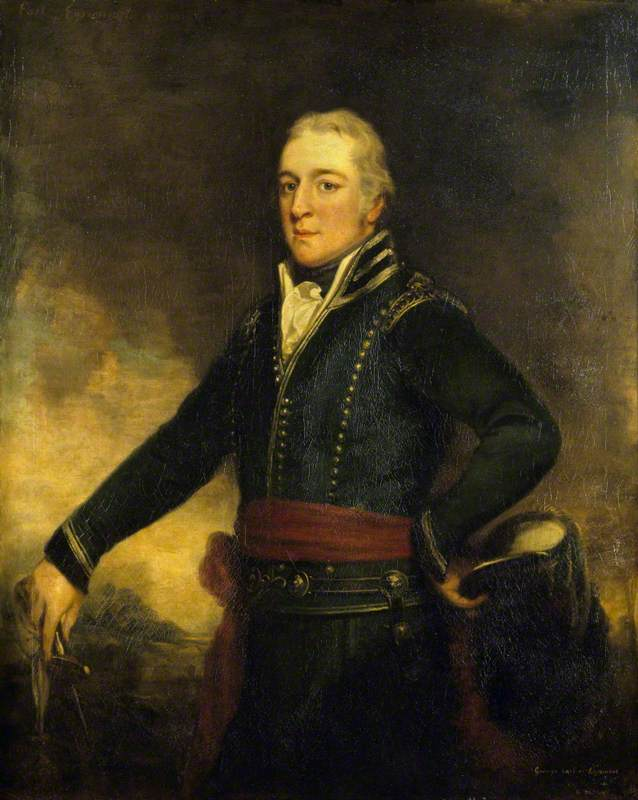
Earl of Egremont, 1799

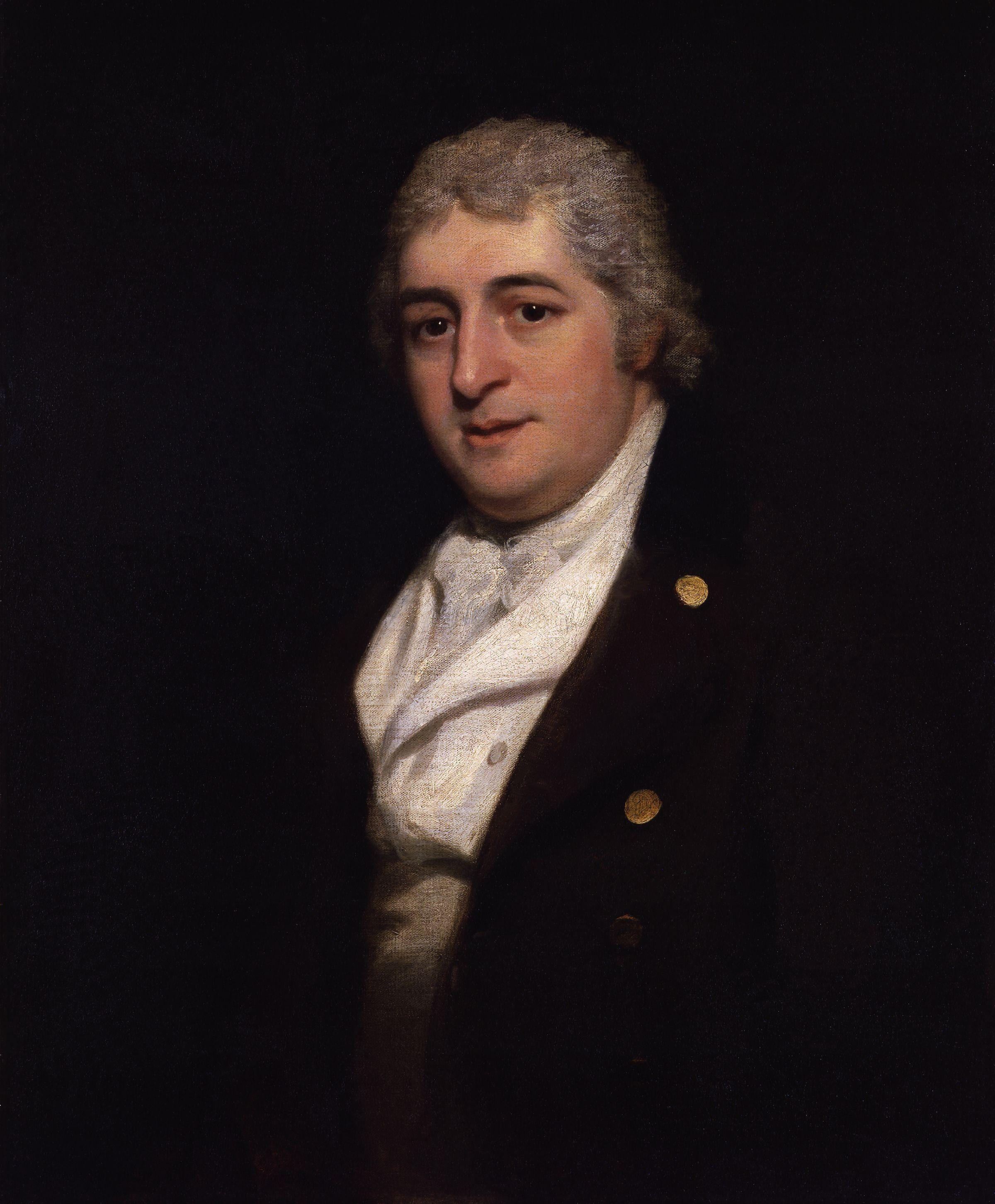
Charles Dibdin, 1799

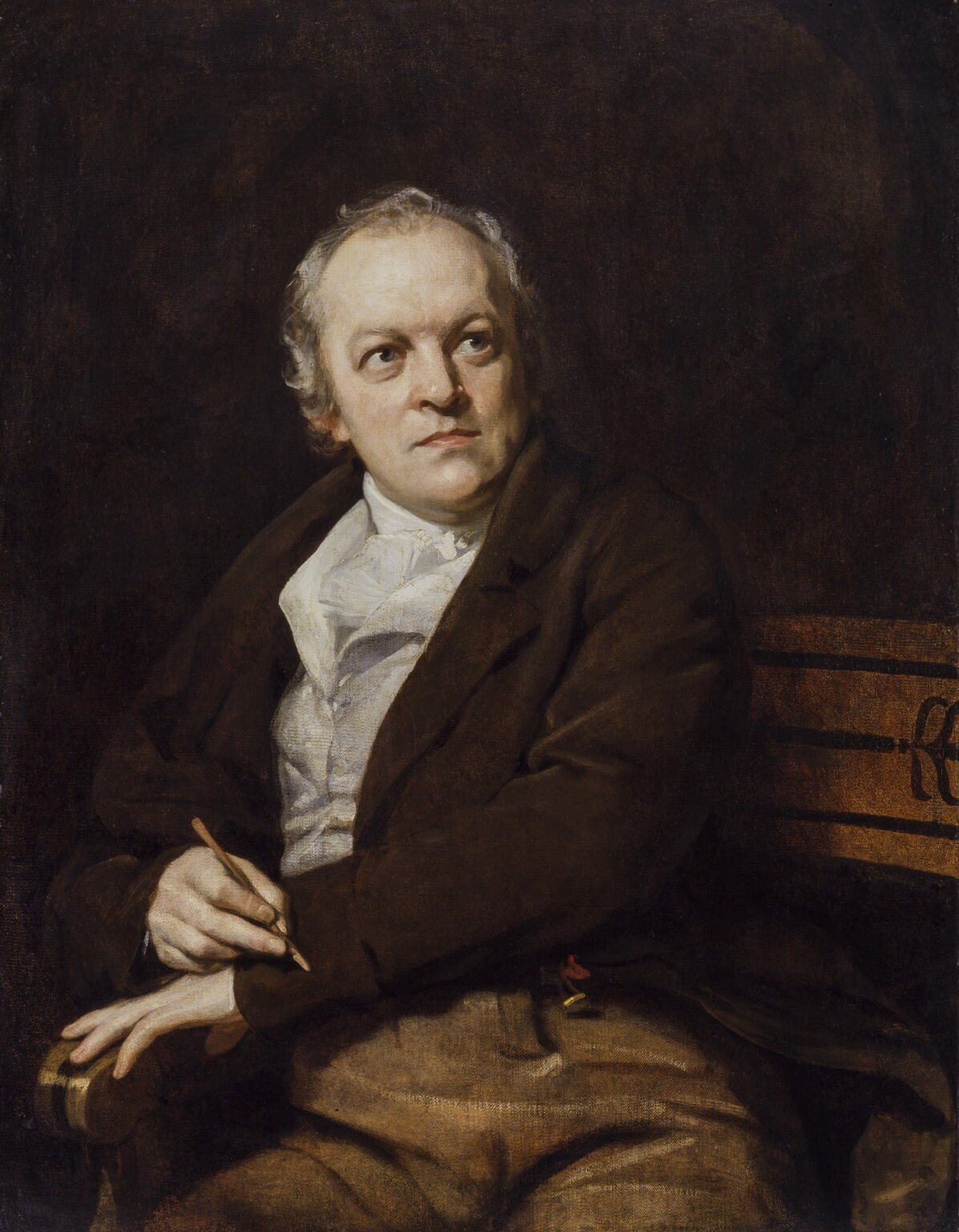
Portrait of William Blake, 1807

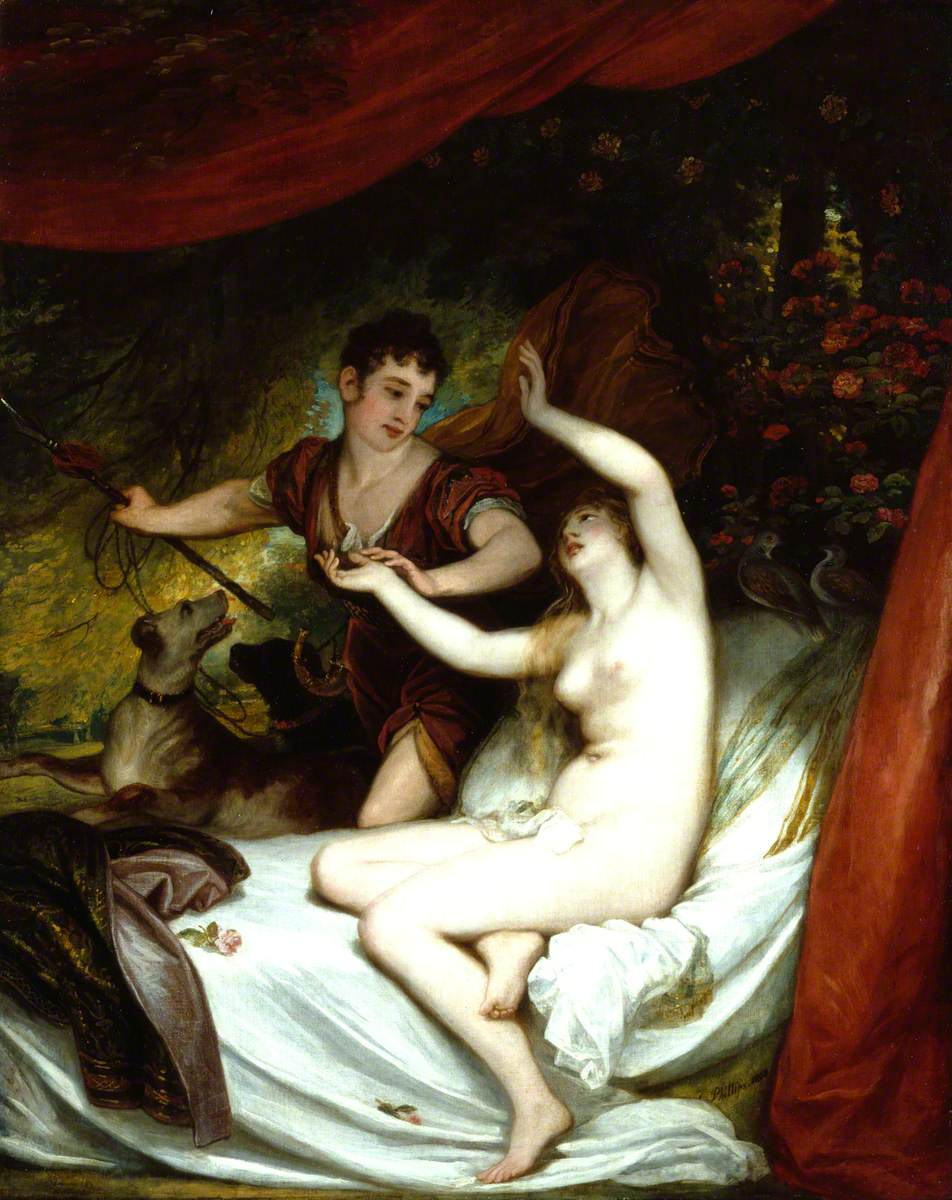
Venus and Adonis, 1808

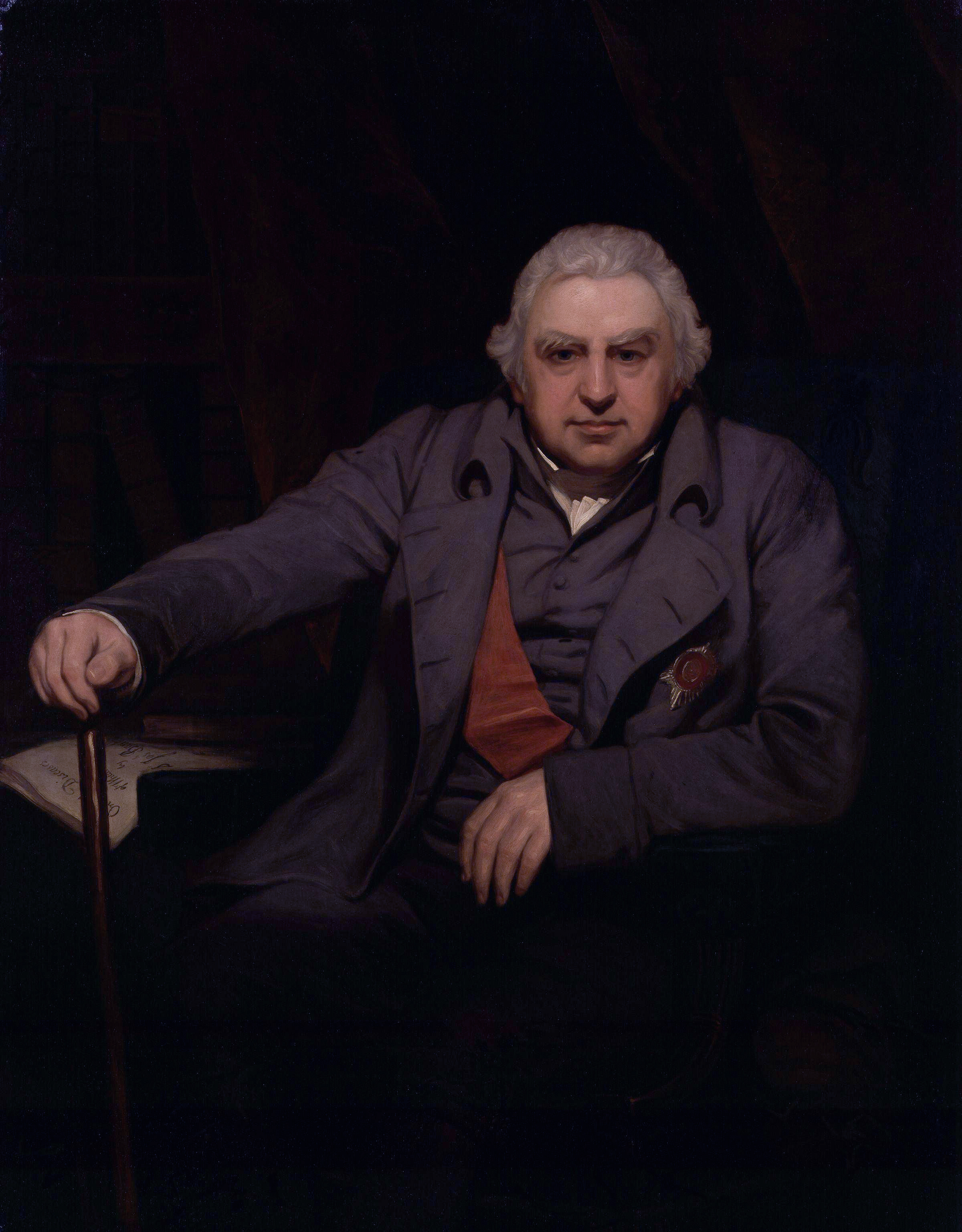
Joseph Banks, 1810

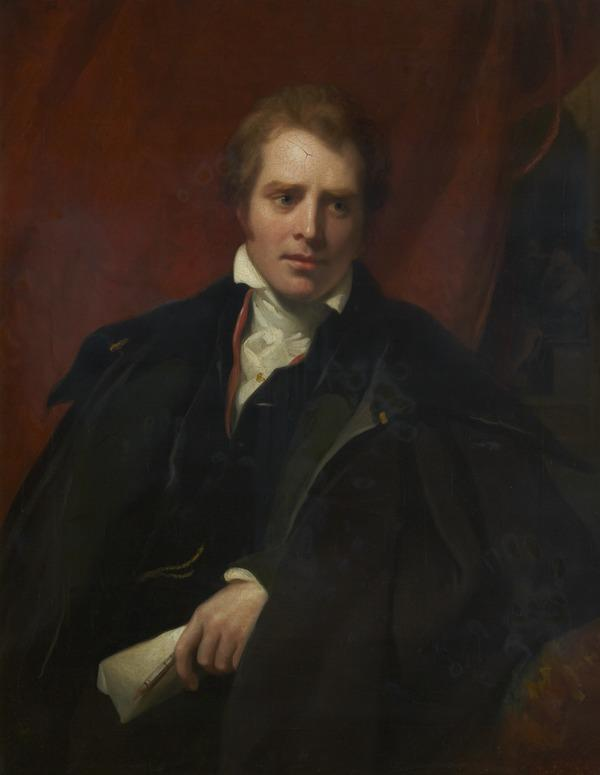
Portrait of David Wilkie, c. 1811

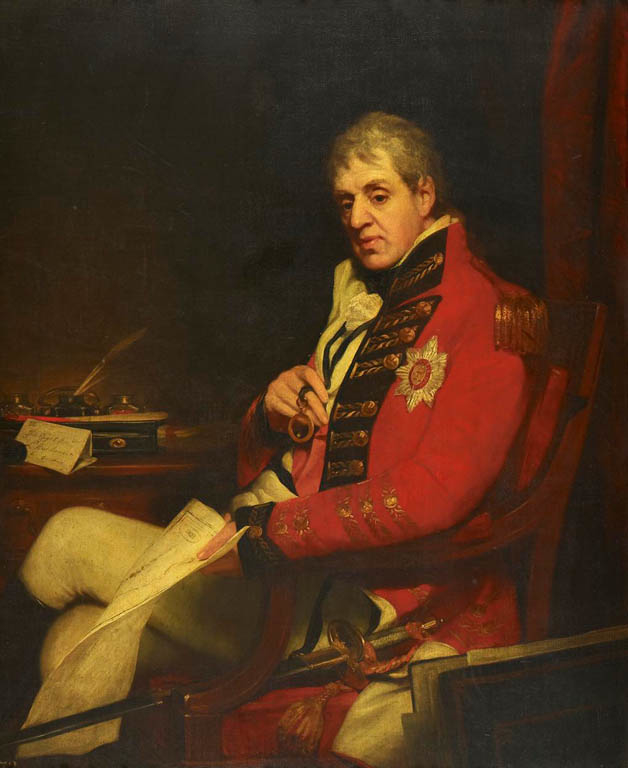
John Hely-Hutchinson, 2nd Earl of Donoughmore, 1811

Portrait of Lady Caroline Lamb, 1813

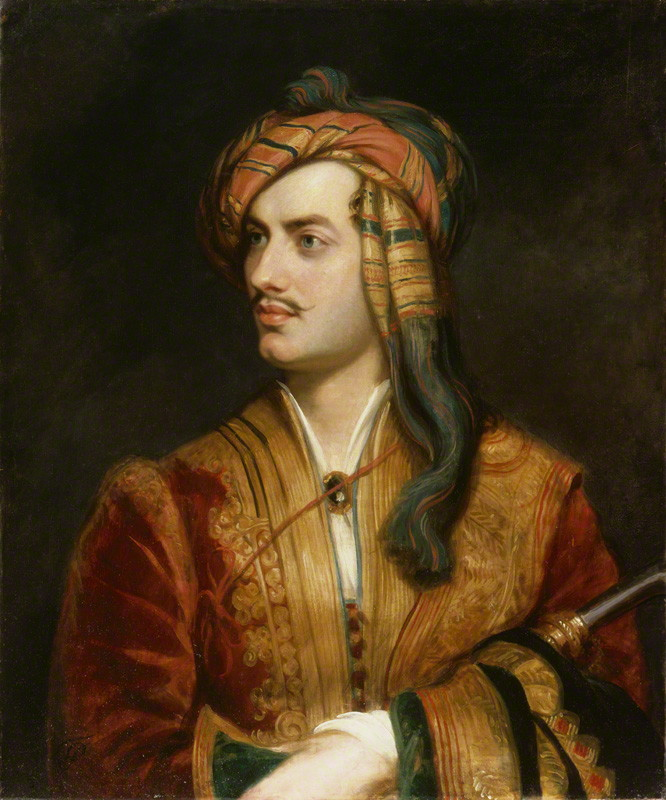
Lord Byron in Albanian Dress, 1813

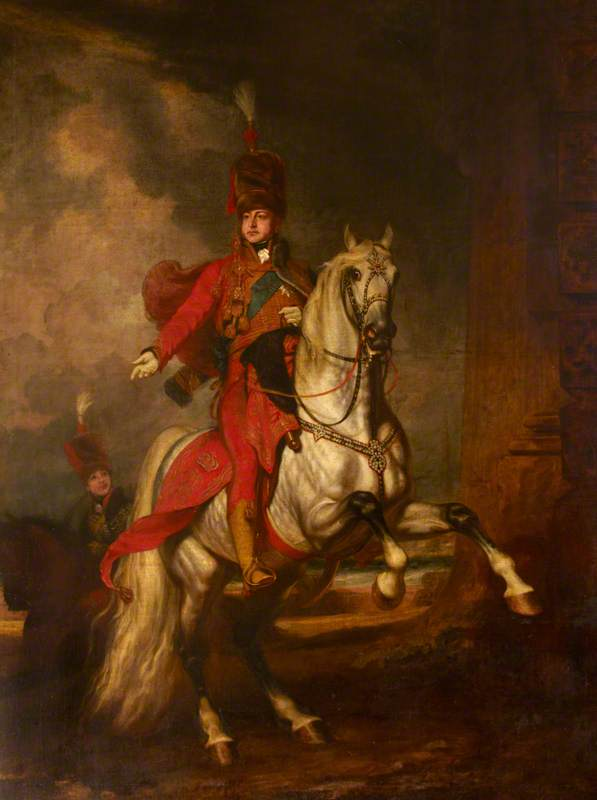
The Prince Regent and Charles Wyndham, 1813

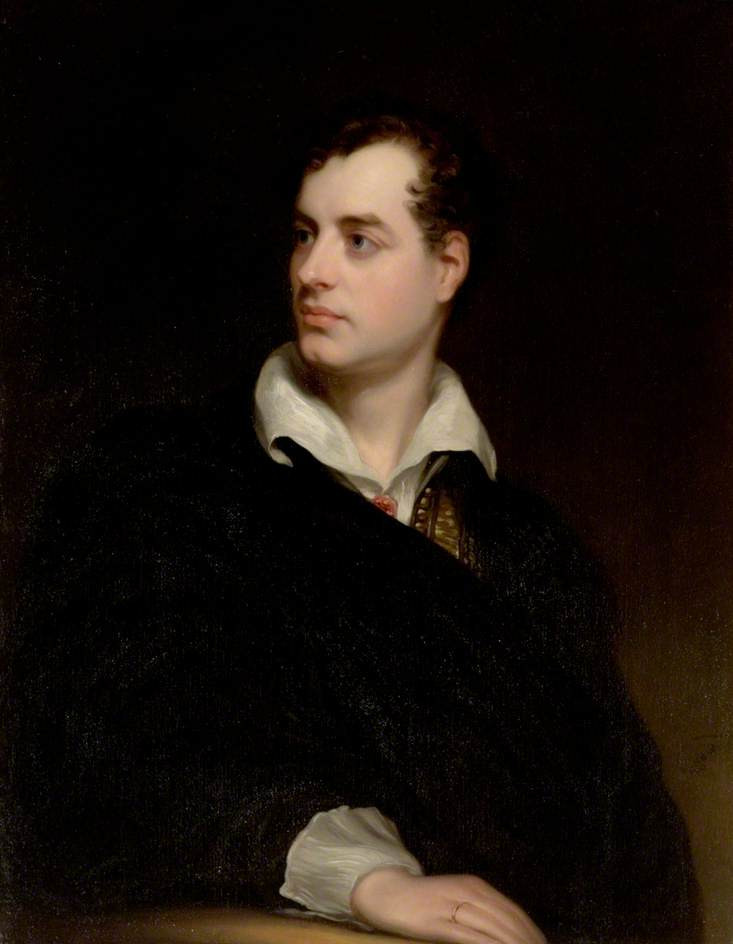
Portrait of Lord Byron, 1814

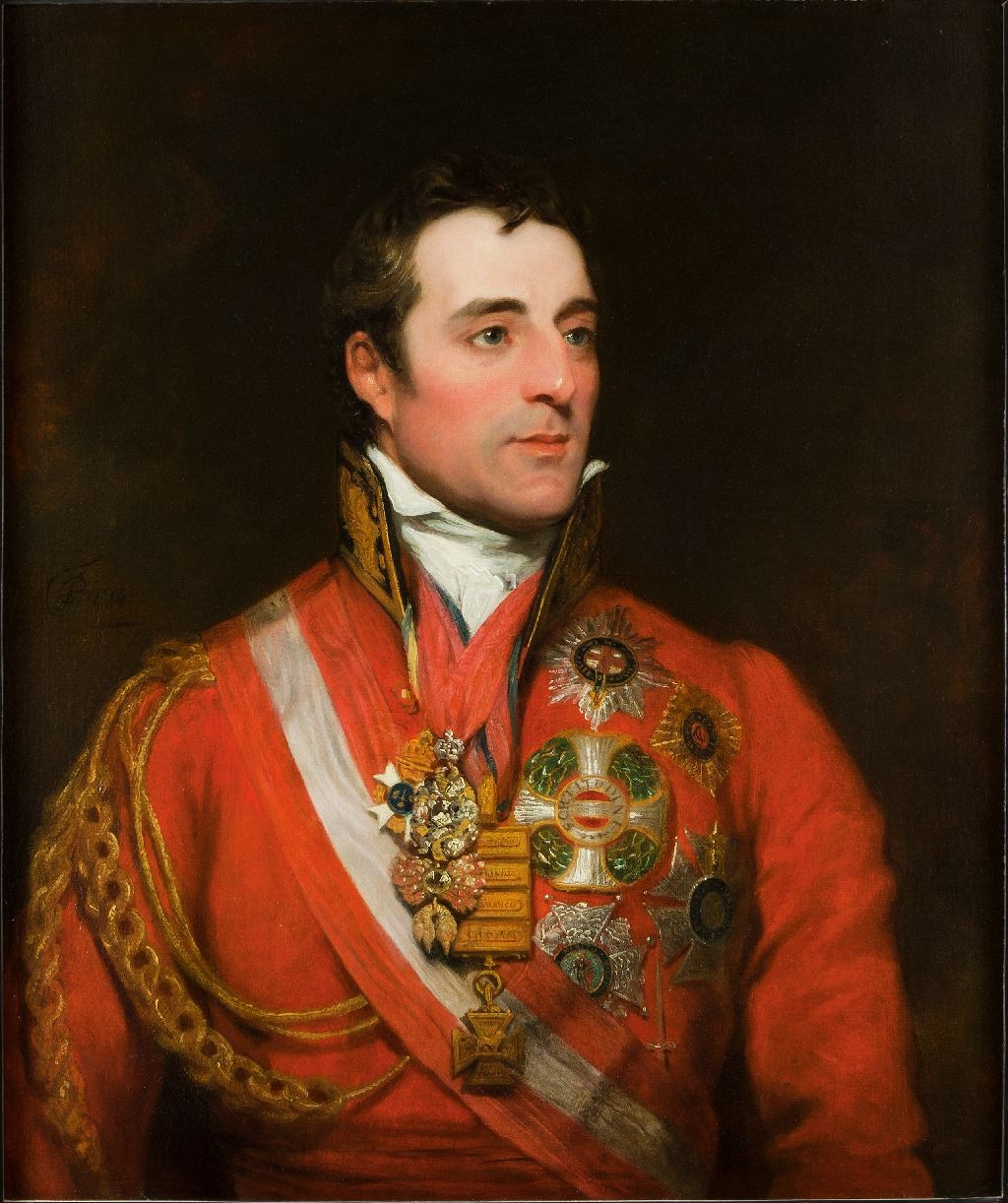
Portrait of the Duke of Wellington, 1814

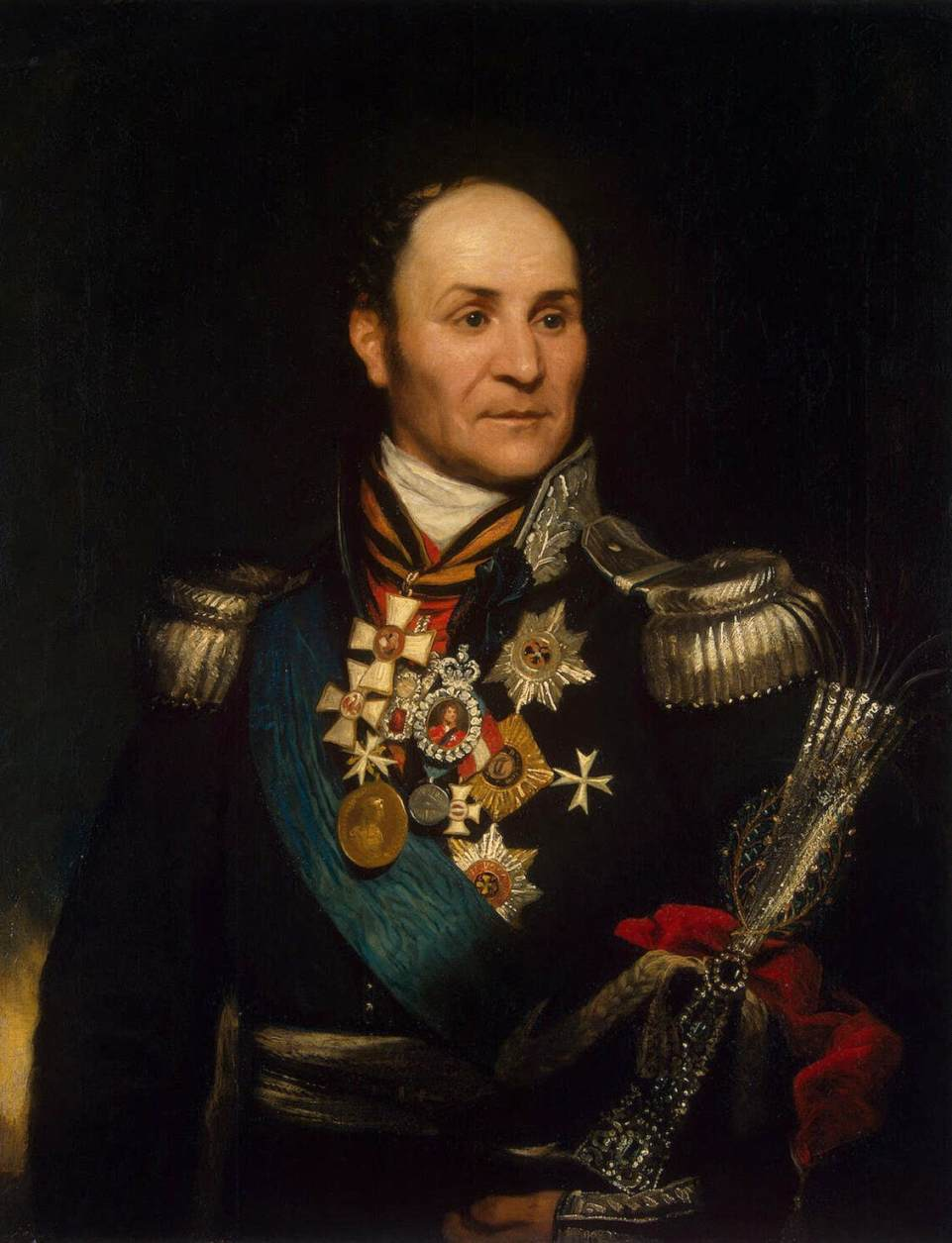
Matvei Platov, 1814

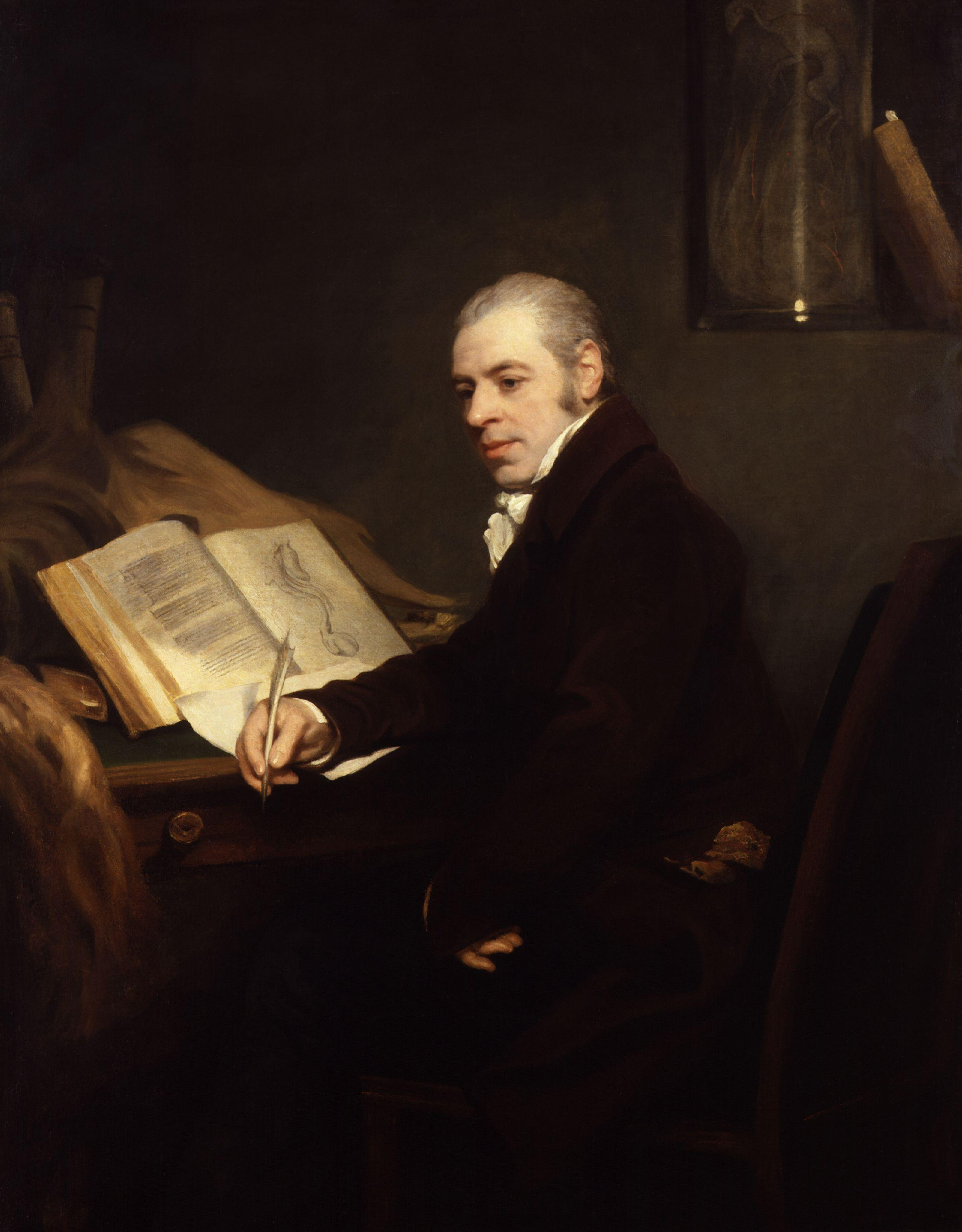
Joshua Brookes, 1815

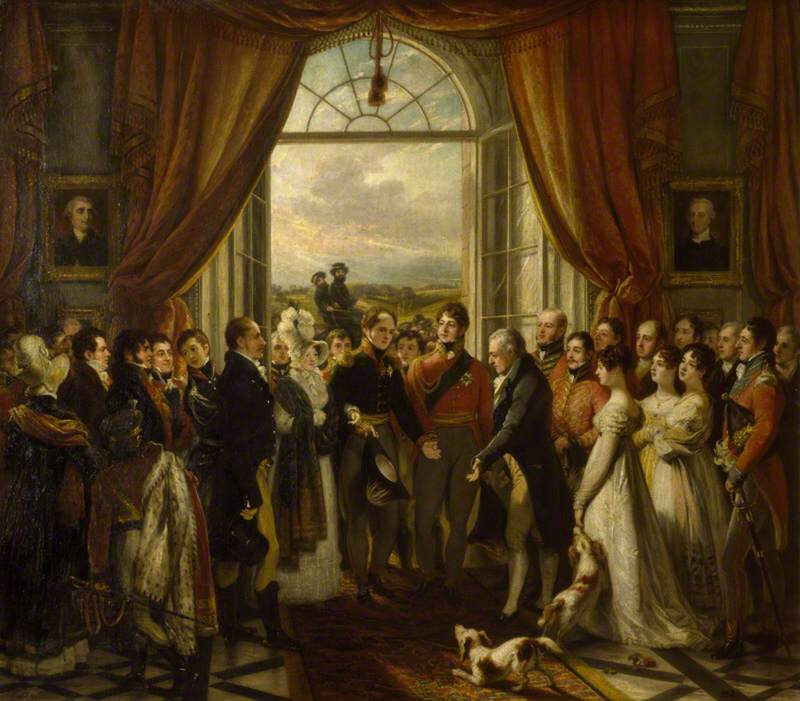
The Allied Sovereigns at Petworth, 1817

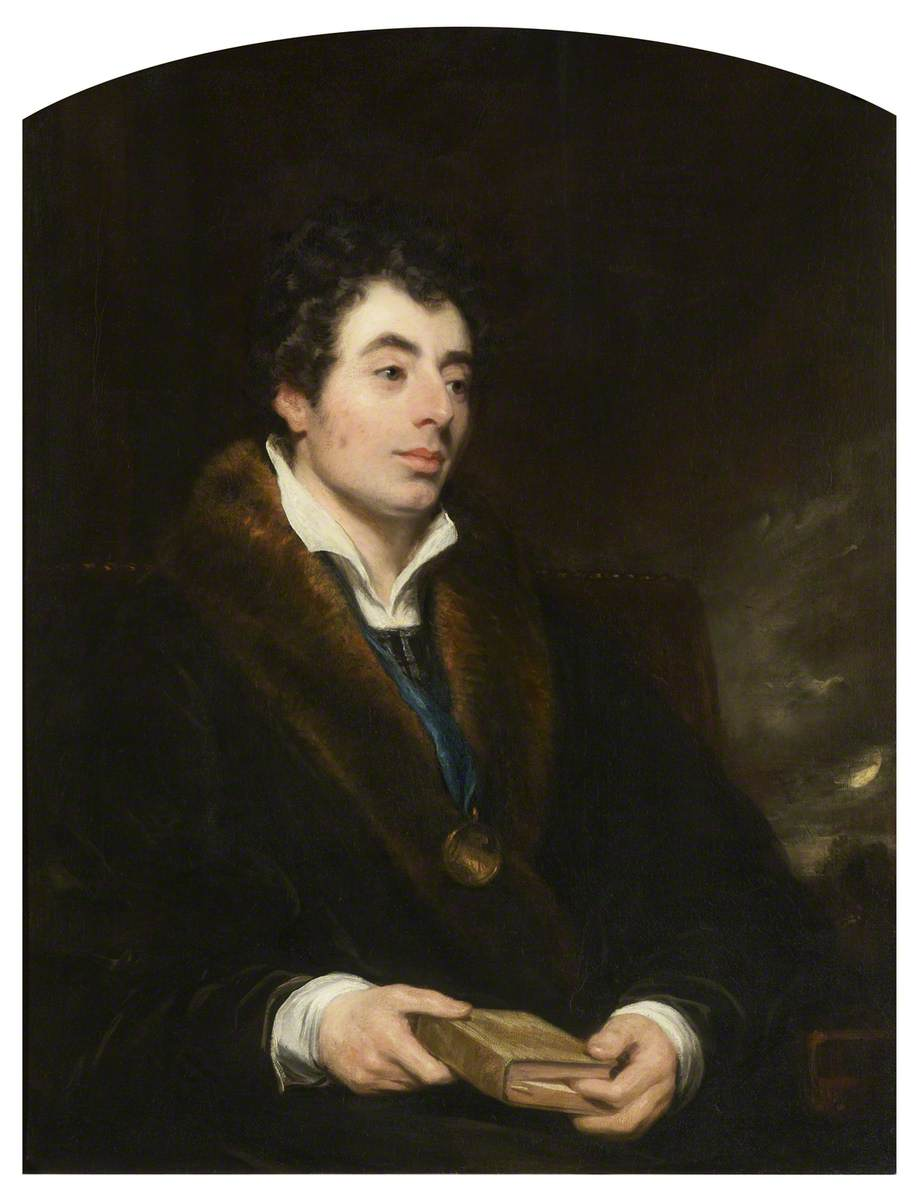
Robert Southey, 1818

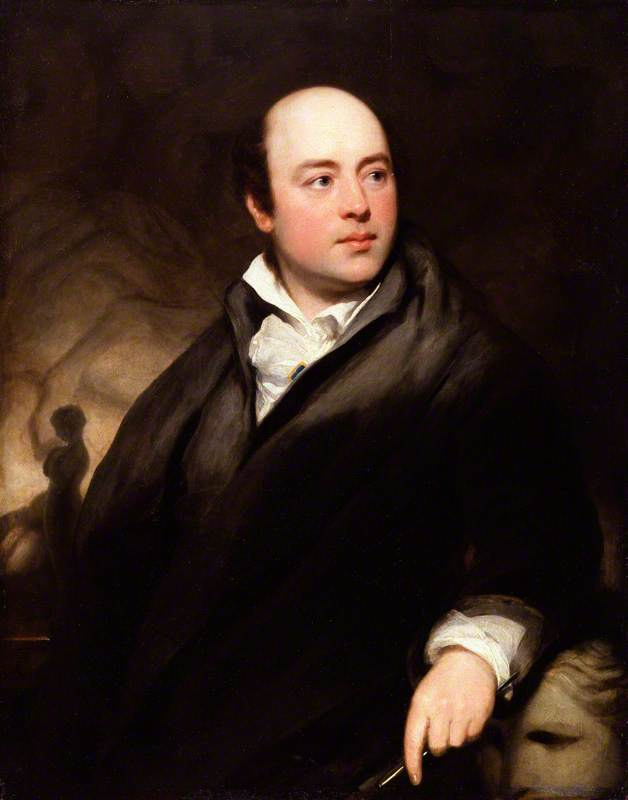
Portrait of Francis Leggatt Chantrey, 1818

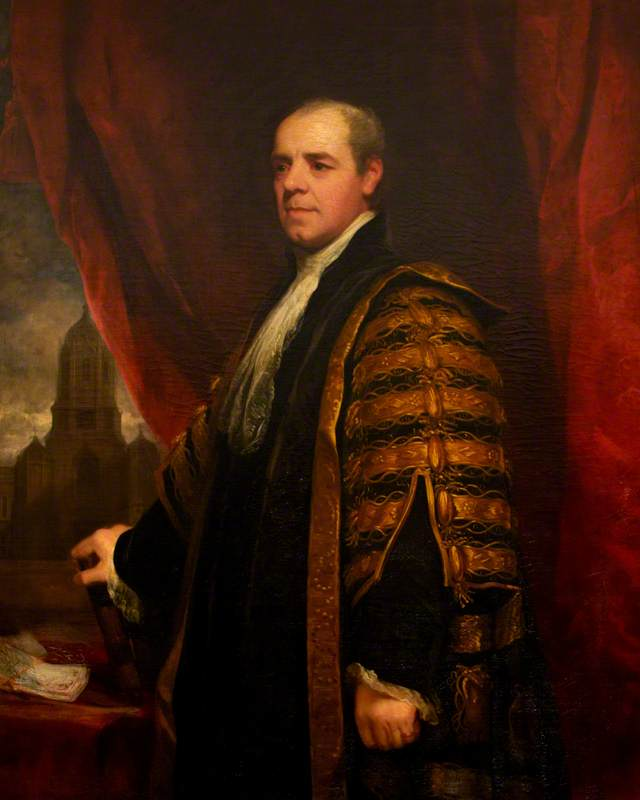
Lord Grenville, 1819

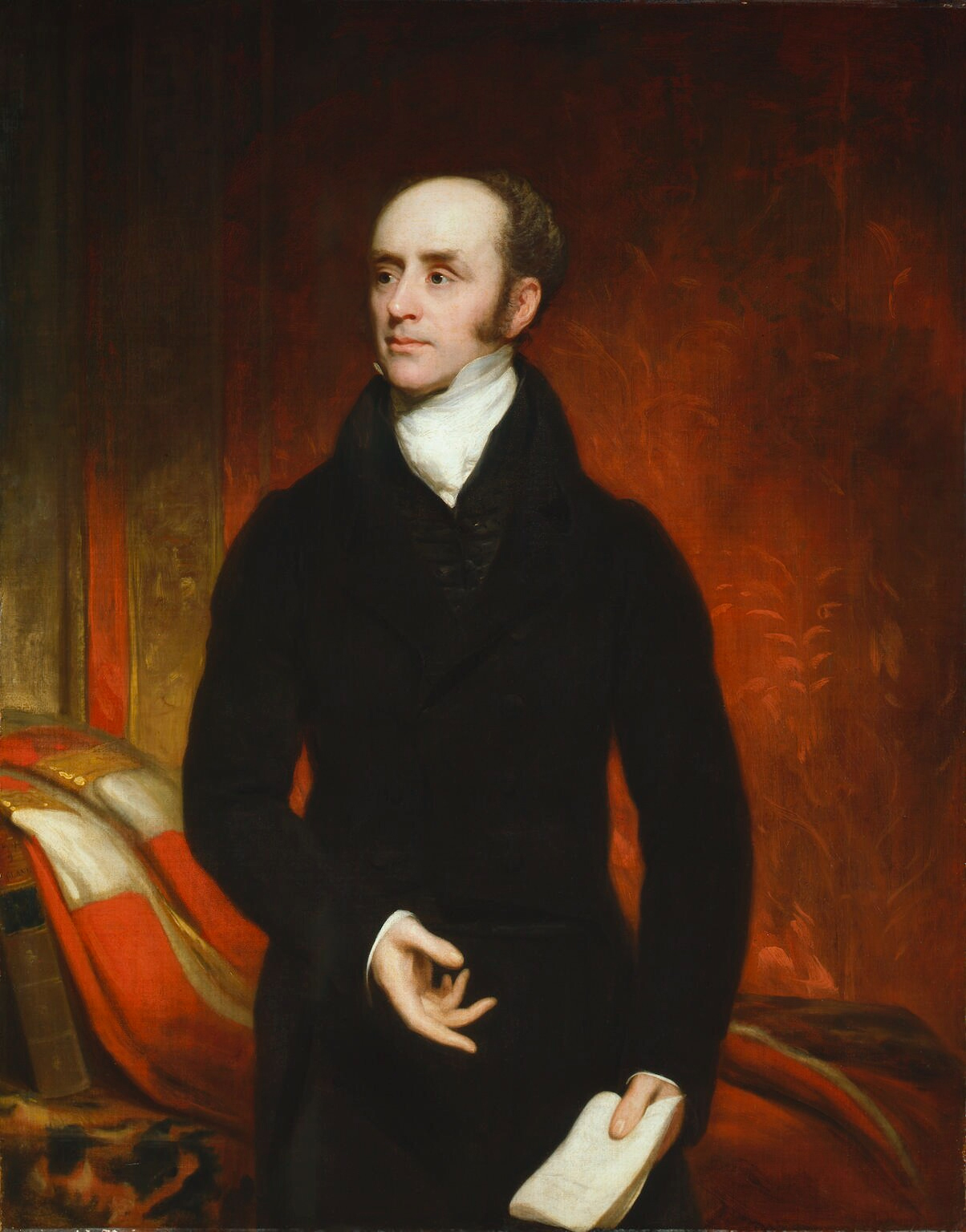
Portrait of Earl Grey, c. 1820

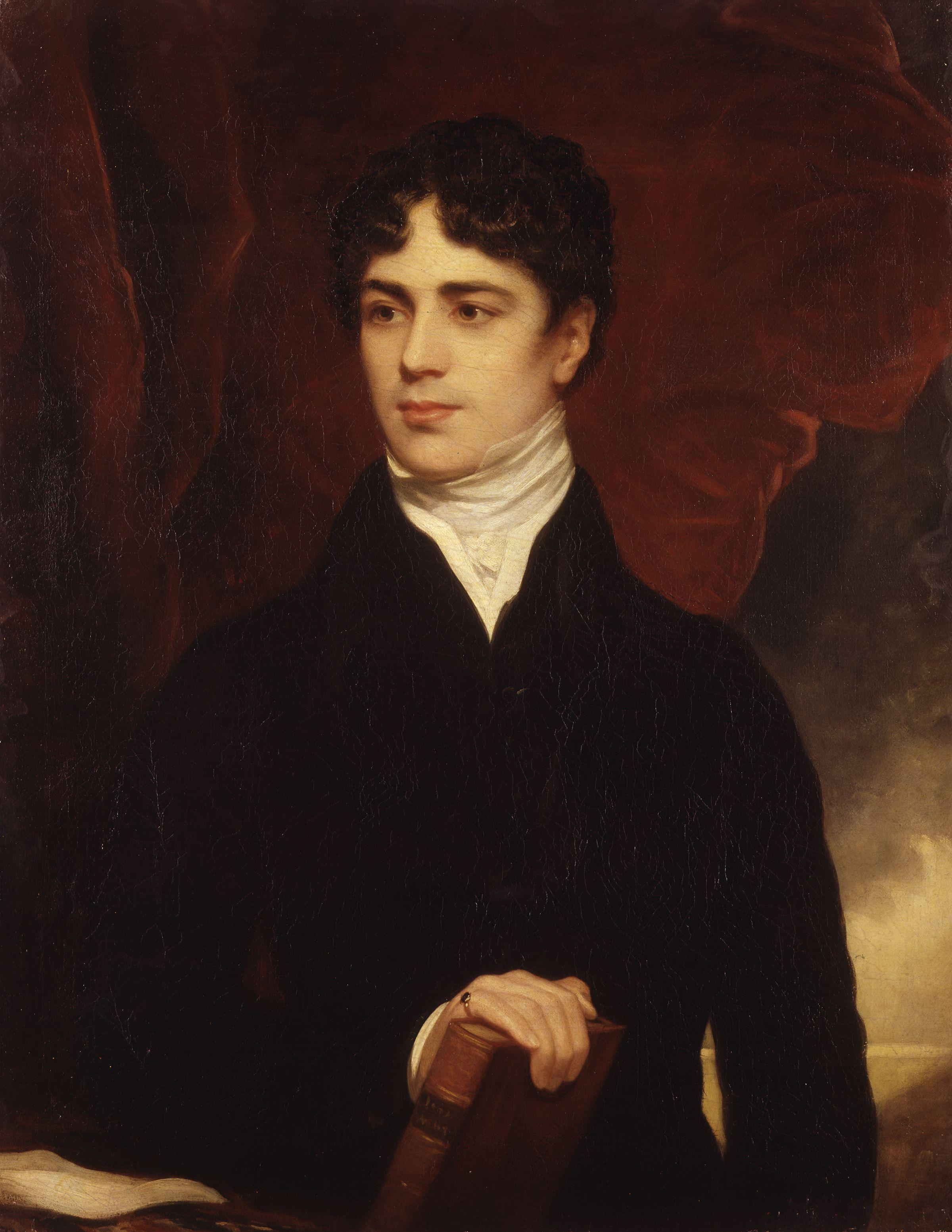
Portrait of the Earl of Durham, 1820

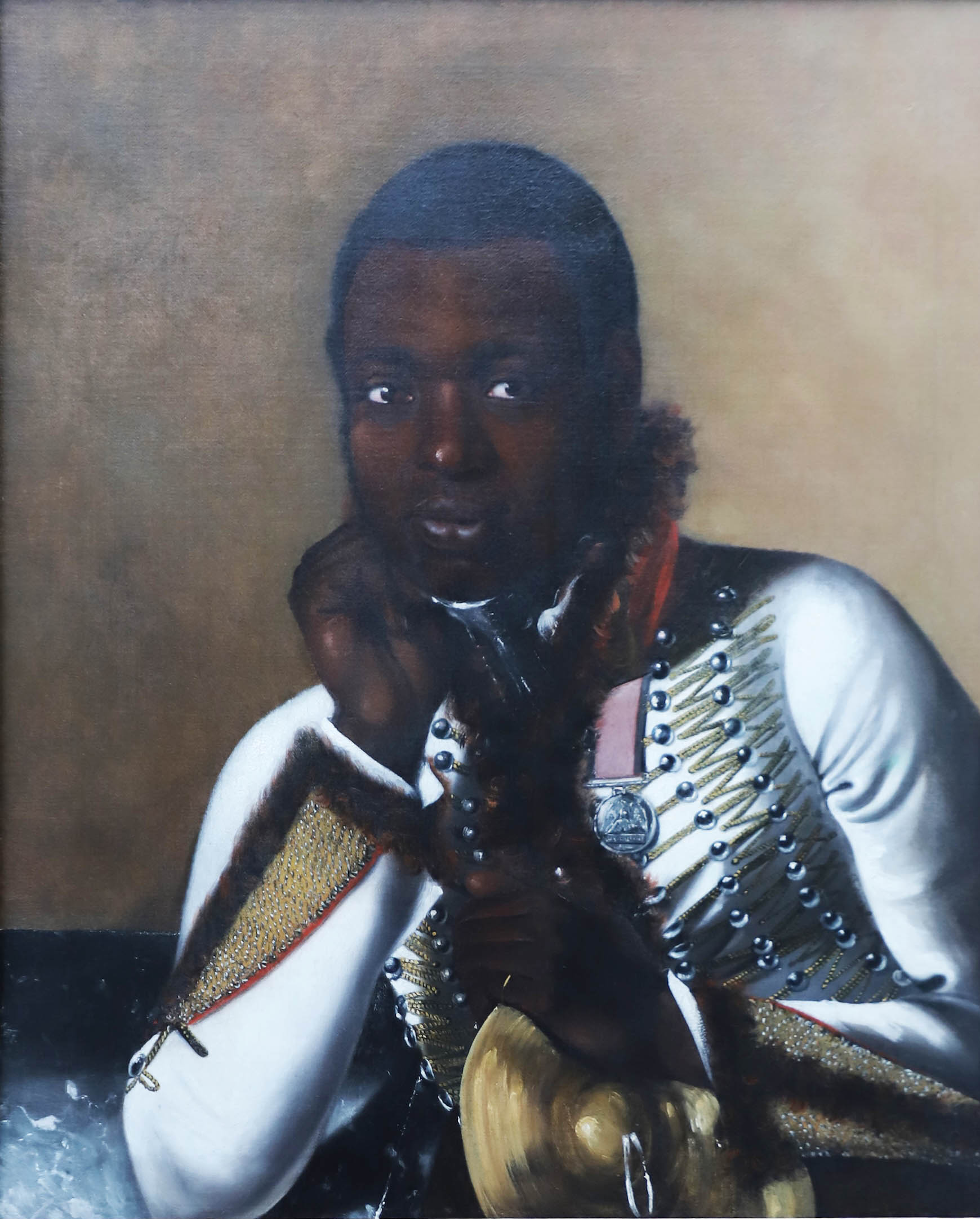
Thomas James, 1821

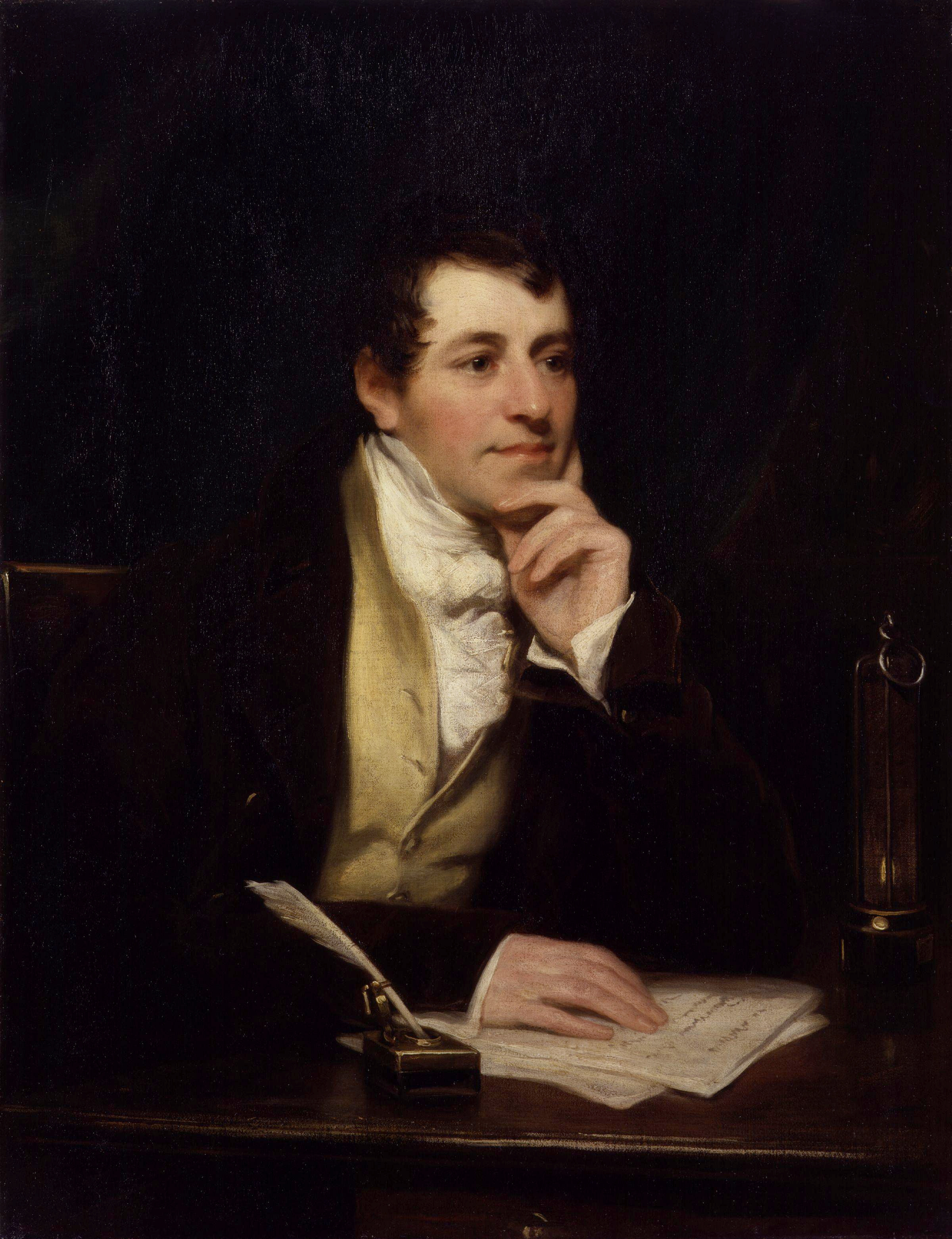
Humphry Davy, 1821

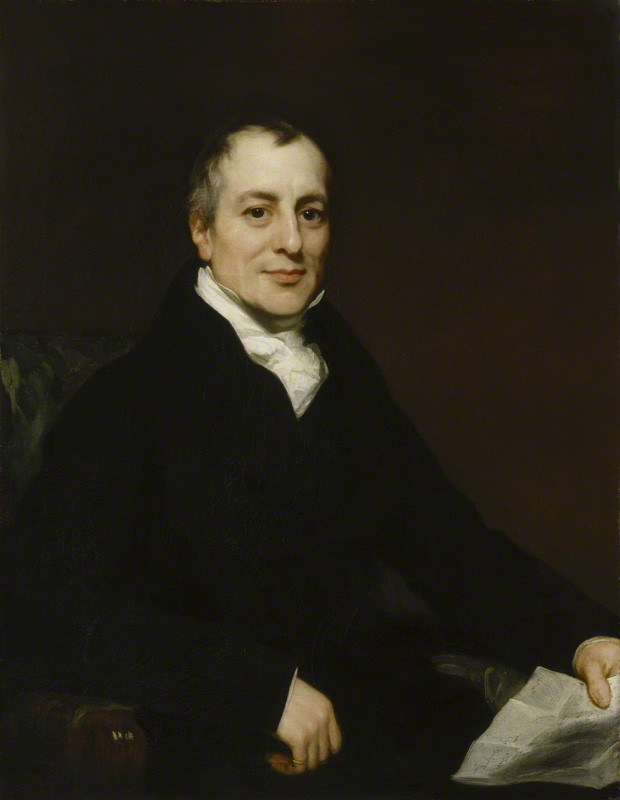
David Ricardo, c. 1821

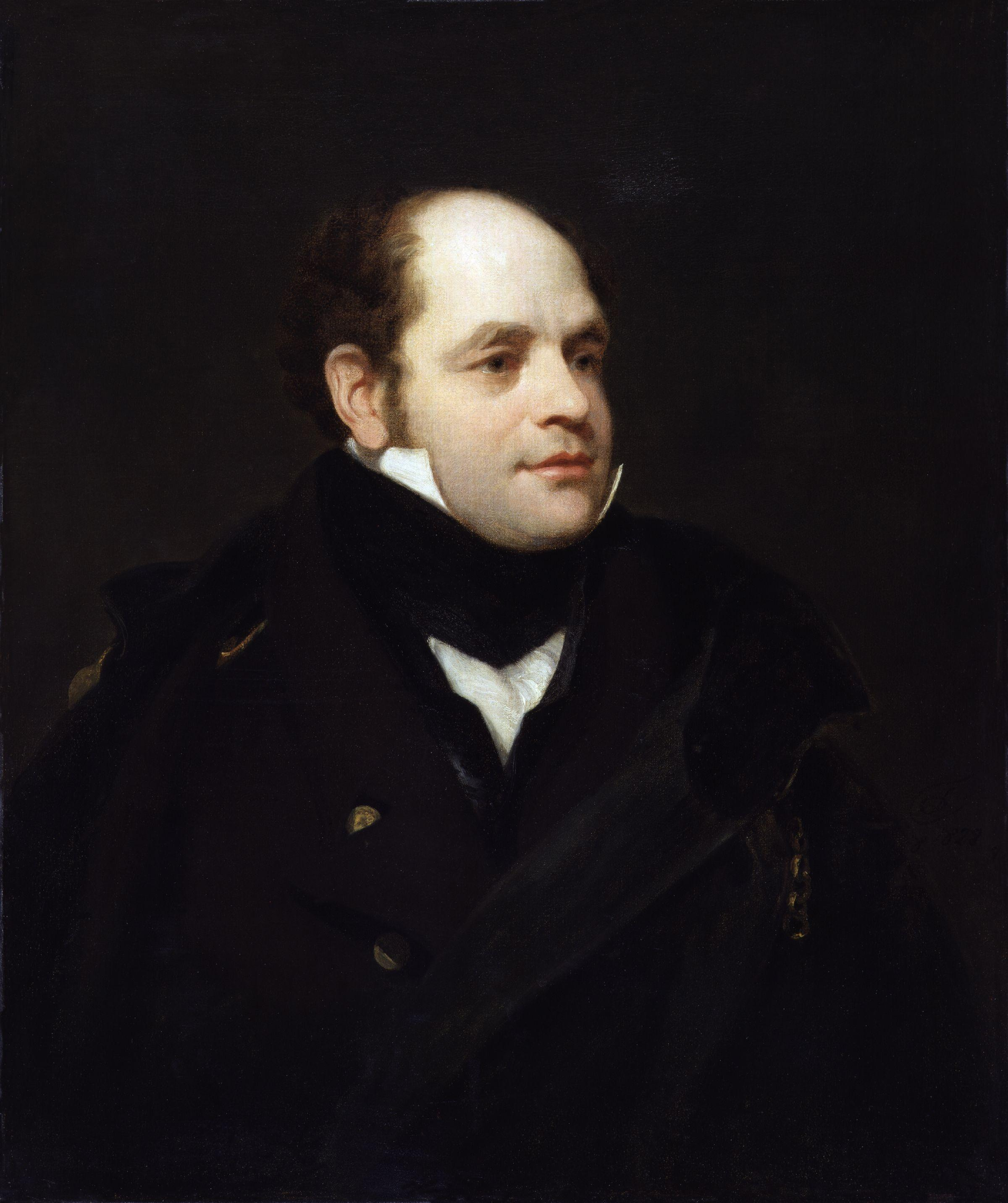
Portrait of John Franklin, 1828

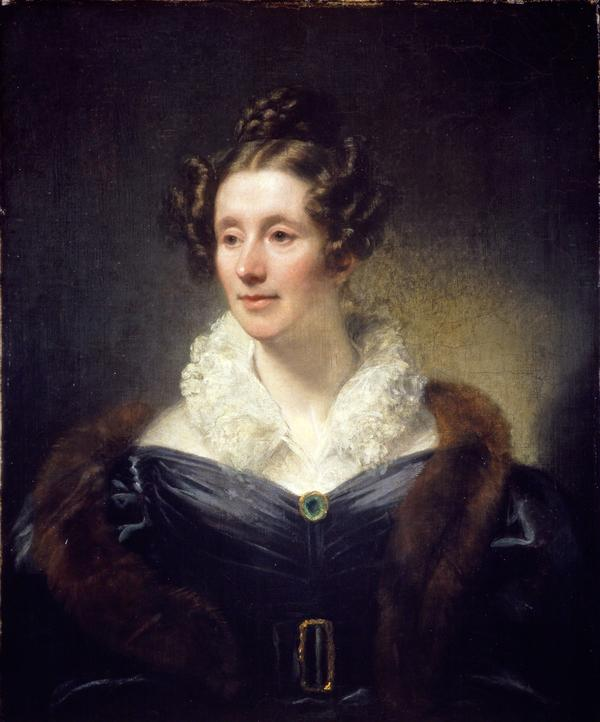
Portrait of Mary Somerville, 1834

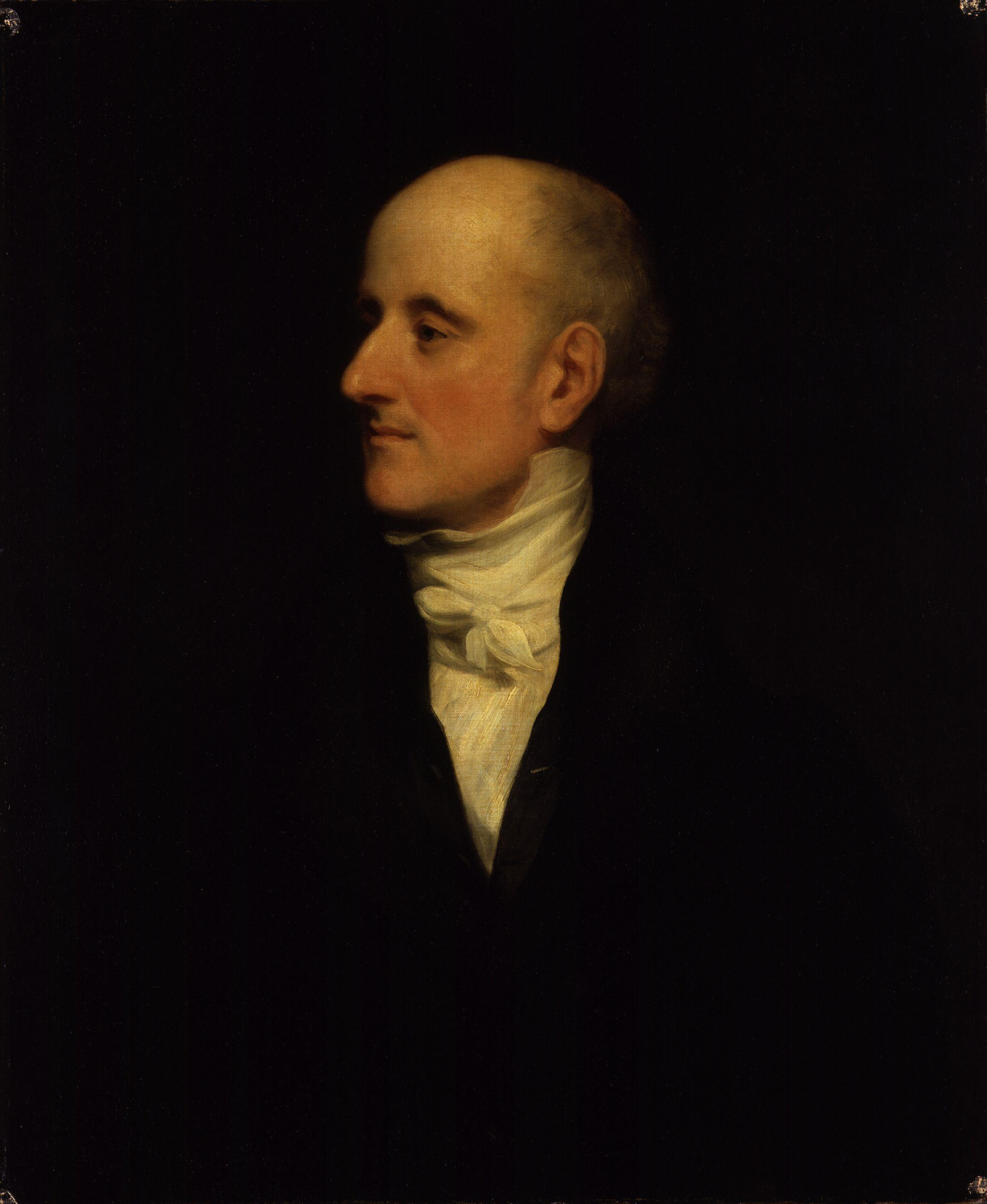
Sir Francis Burdett, 1834

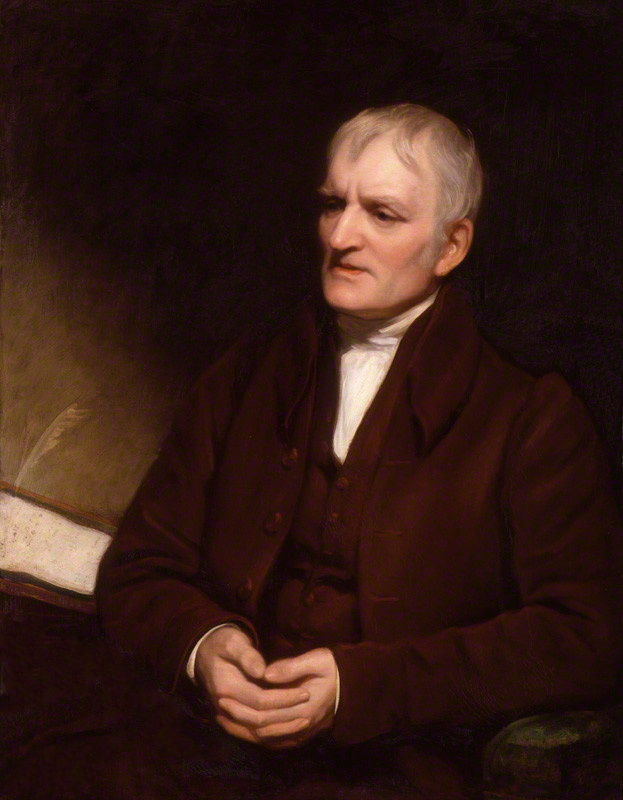
John Dalton, 1835

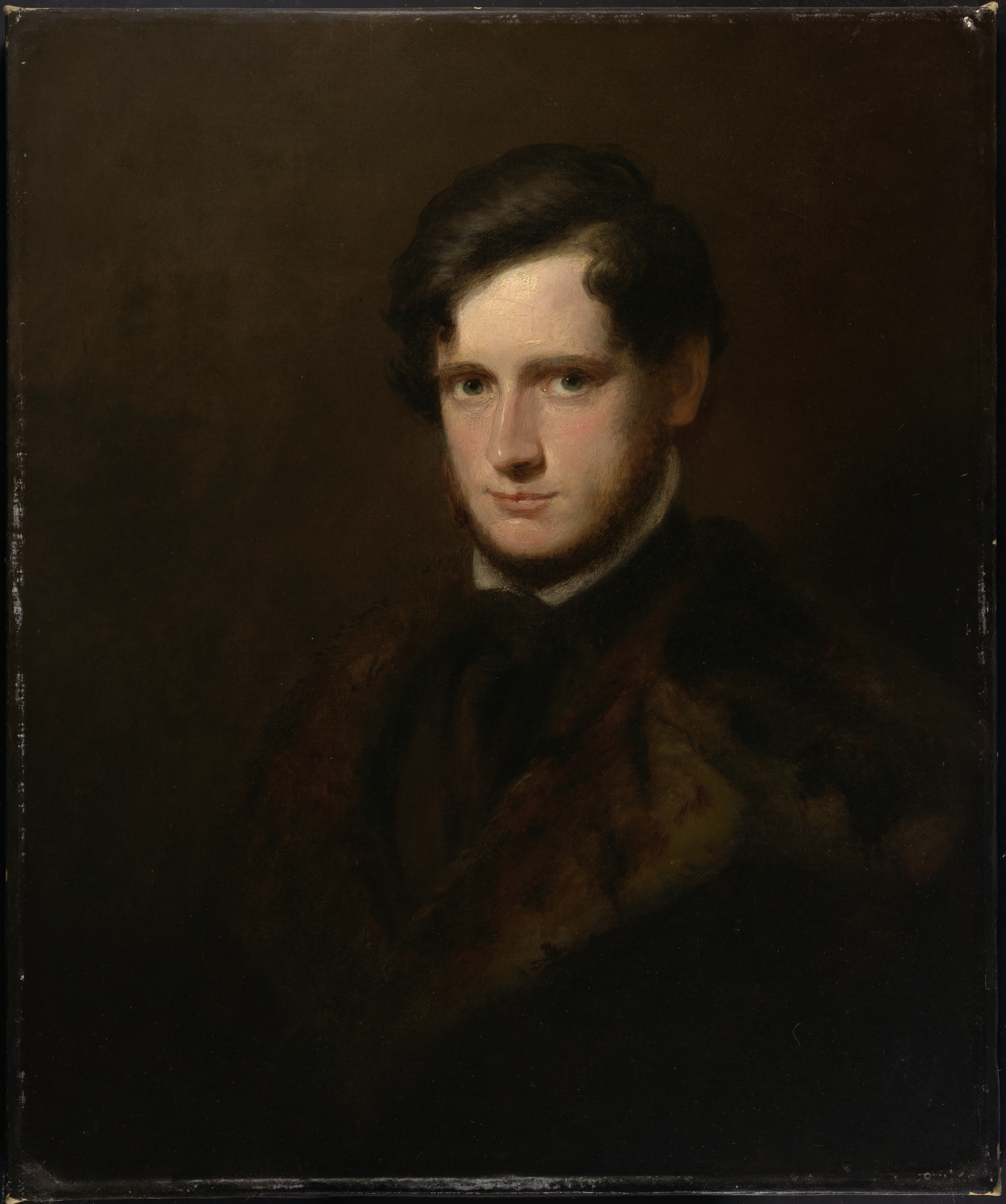
John Lothrop Motley, c. 1835

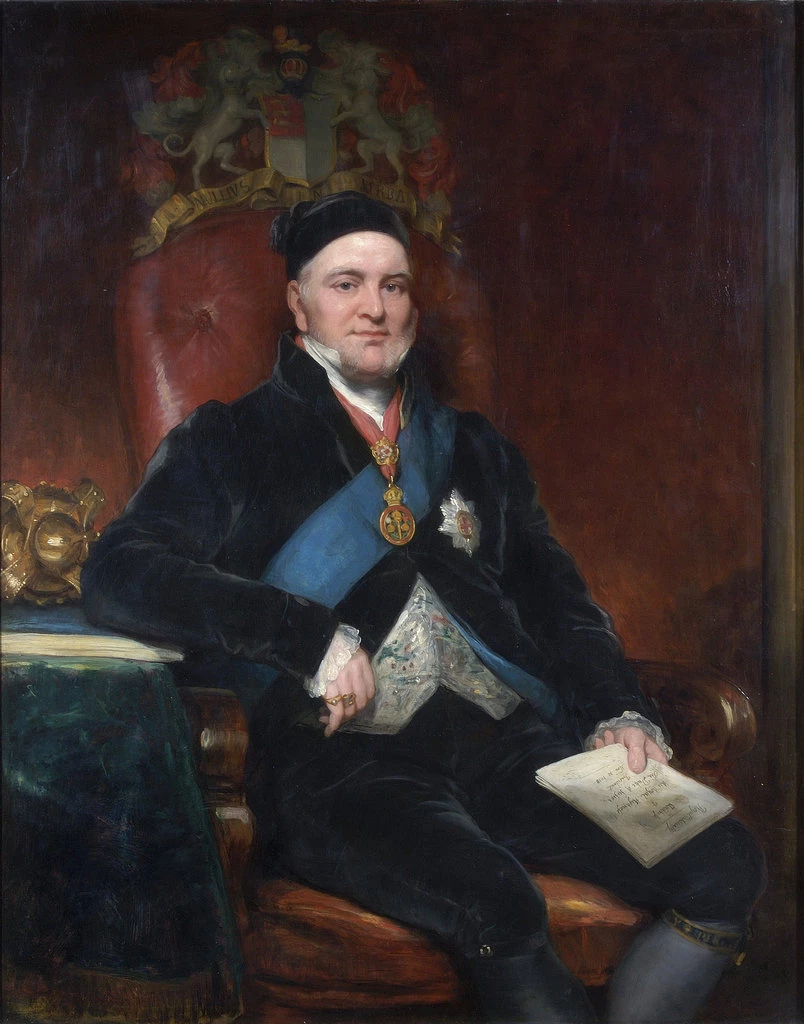
Prince Augustus Frederick, Duke of Sussex, c. 1838

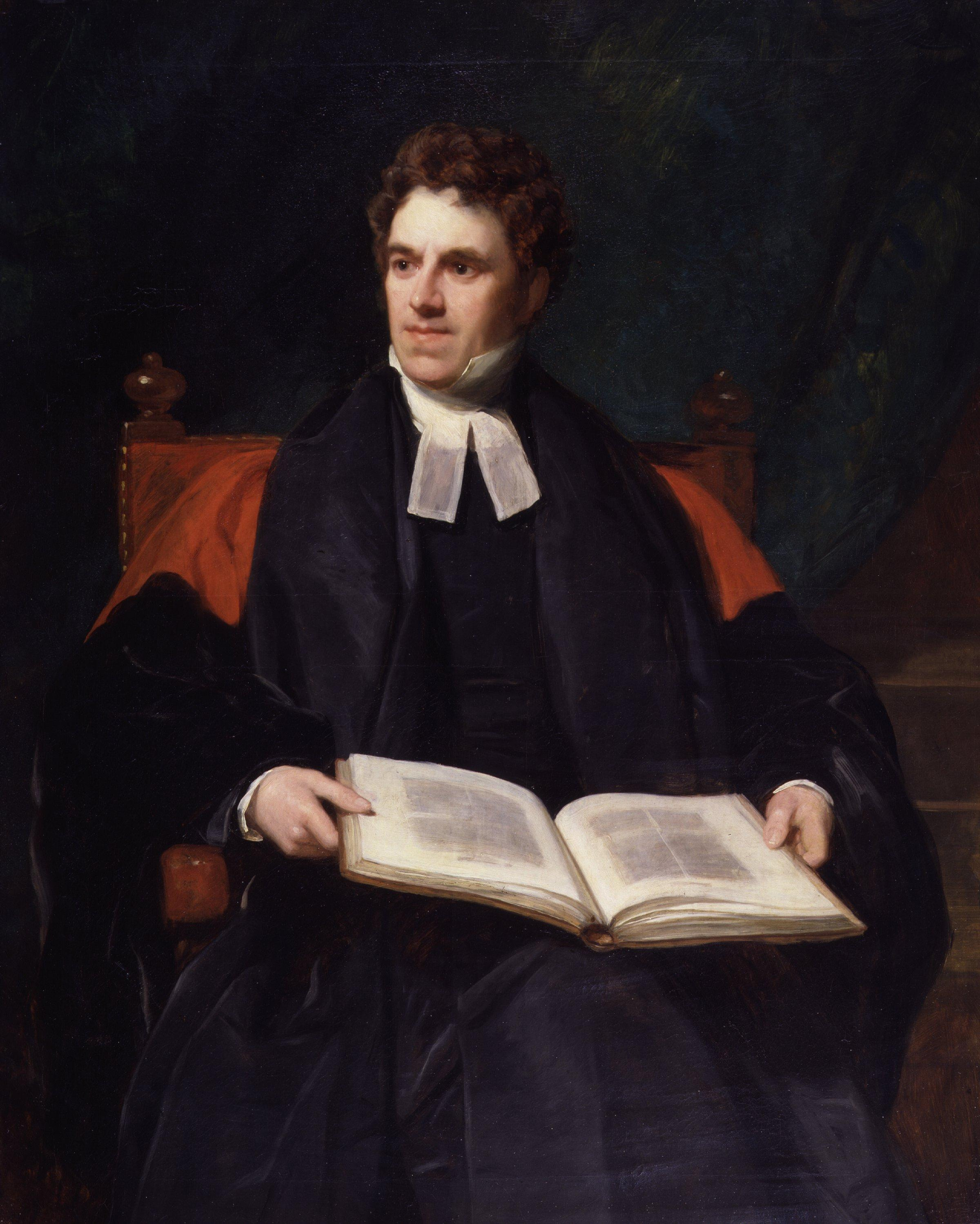
Portrait of Thomas Arnold, 1839

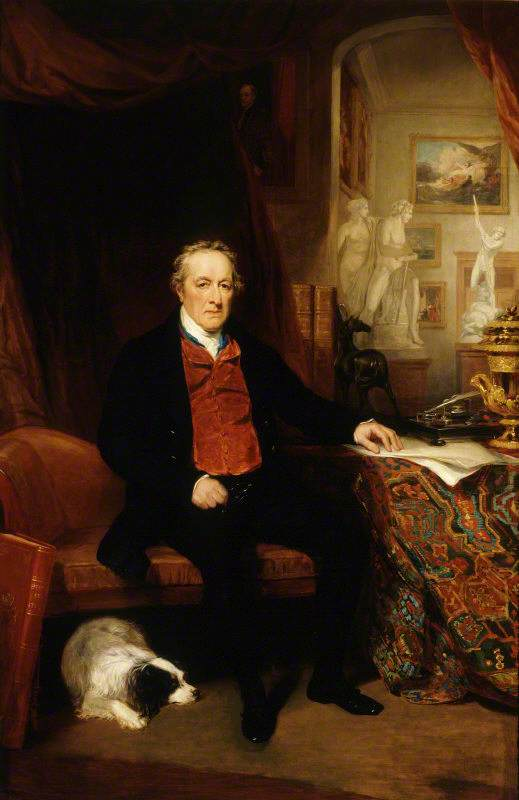
Portrait of the Earl of Egremont, 1839

Portrait of Michael Faraday, 1842

== Sources ==
This article incorporates text from a free content work. Text taken from Dictionary of national biography, 216-217, Graves, R.E., Smith, Elder, and Co.. Internet Archive.
