= Minuscule 93 =

- New Testament manuscript
- Name: Codex Graevii
- Text: Acts, Paul, Rev. †
- Date: 10th-century
- Script: Greek
- Now at: Bibliothèque nationale de France
- Size: 22.8 cm by 17.7 cm
- Type: Byzantine text-type
- Category: V
- Note: marginalia

Minuscule 93 (in the Gregory-Aland numbering), α 51 (Soden), formerly known as Codex Graevii, is a Greek minuscule manuscript of the New Testament, on parchment leaves. Palaeographically it has been assigned to the 10th-century.

Formerly it was labelled it by 17^{a}, 21^{p}, and 18^{r}. It has full marginalia.

== Description ==
The codex contains the text of the New Testament except of the Gospels, with some lacunae (Romans 16:17-27; 1 Corinthians 1:1-7; Hebrews 13:15-25; Revelation 1:1-5), on 270 parchment leaves (22.8 cm by 17.7 cm). The order of books is a usual for the Greek manuscripts: Acts, Catholic epistles, Pauline epistles, and Apocalypse. The Hebrews follows Philemon.

The text is written in one column per page, 27 lines per page. Text of Rev 1:1-5 was supplied by a later hand.

The text is divided according to the κεφαλαια (chapters), whose numbers are given at the margin, and the τιτλοι (titles of chapters) at the top of the pages.

It contains prolegomena, tables of the κεφαλαια (table of contents) before each book, liturgical notes at the margin (for liturgical use), incipits, subscriptions at the end of each book, numbers of στιχοι, and music notes. It has an additional material: Life of prophets and treatise of Pseudo-Dorotheus about 12 apostles and 70 disciples of Jesus (as codices 82, 177, 459, 613, 617, 699).

== Text ==
The Greek text of the codex is a representative of the Byzantine text-type. Aland placed it in Category V. In Catholic epistles it has 20-30% non-Byzantine readings.

== History ==
In 1079 the manuscript was bought by Antonius, a monk. It was held in Constantinople and was purchased by Pierre Séguier (1588–1672). It was examined by Bernard de Montfaucon Johann Jakob Wettstein, and Paulin Martin. C. R. Gregory saw the manuscript in 1885. Herman C. Hoskier collated the text of the Apocalypse.

Formerly it was labelled it by 17^{a}, 21^{p}, and 18^{r}. In 1908 Gregory gave the number 93 to it.

It is currently housed in at the Bibliothèque nationale de France (Fonds Coislin, Gr. 205), at Paris.

== See also ==
- List of New Testament minuscules
- Biblical manuscript
- Textual criticism
