= Minuscule 613 =

- New Testament manuscript
- Text: Acts of the Apostles, Pauline epistles †
- Date: 12th century
- Script: Greek
- Now at: Turin National University Library
- Size: 23.7 cm by 17.3 cm
- Type: ?
- Category: none
- Hand: clear large hand

Minuscule 613 (in the Gregory-Aland numbering), α ^{298} (von Soden), is a Greek minuscule manuscript of the New Testament, on parchment. Palaeographically it has been assigned to the 12th century. The manuscript is lacunose. Formerly it was labeled by 136^{a} and 169^{p}.

== Description ==
The codex contains the text of the Acts of the Apostles, Catholic epistles, and Pauline epistles on 174 parchment leaves (size 23.7 cm by 17.3 cm), with lacunae (Hebrews 13:24-25). The text is written in one column per page, 27 lines per page.

It contains Prolegomena, tables of the κεφαλαια (before each sacred book), lectionary markings noticed lessons for feasts and weekdays, incipits, and Synaxarion.

It contains the treatise of Pseudo-Dorotheus on the Seventy disciples and twelve apostles (as codices 82, 93, 177, 459, 617, 699).

The order of books: Acts, Catholic epistles, and Pauline epistles. Hebrews is placed after Epistle to Philemon.

== Text ==
Aland did not place the Greek text of the codex in any Category.

== History ==
The manuscript was added to the list of New Testament manuscripts by Johann Martin Augustin Scholz. It was examined by Pasinus. C. R. Gregory saw the manuscript in 1886. Formerly it was labeled by 136^{a} and 169^{p}. In 1908 Gregory gave the number 613 to it.

The manuscript was partially destroyed by fire.

The manuscript currently is housed at the Turin National University Library (C. V. 1), at Turin.

== See also ==
- List of New Testament minuscules
- Biblical manuscript
- Textual criticism
