= Minuscule 82 =

- New Testament manuscript
- Text: Acts, Paul, Rev.
- Date: 10th century
- Script: Greek
- Now at: Bibliothèque nationale de France
- Size: 20.6 cm by 16 cm
- Type: Byzantine text-type
- Category: V
- Hand: neatly written
- Note: marginalia

Minuscule 82 (in the Gregory-Aland numbering), O^{1} (Soden), is a Greek minuscule manuscript of the New Testament, on parchment leaves. Paleographically it has been assigned to the 10th century. Formerly it was labelled by 10^{a}, 12^{p}, and 2^{r}. It has marginalia.

== Description ==
The codex contains the text of the Acts, Catholic epistles, Paul, Rev., with a commentary, on 246 parchment leaves (size 20.6 cm by 16 cm). The text is written in one column per page, 28 lines per page. The manuscript is neatly written.

The text is divided according to the κεφαλαια (chapters), whose numbers are given at the margin, with the τιτλοι (titles of chapters) at the top of the pages.

It contains Prolegomena, tables of the κεφαλαια (tables of contents) before each book, subscriptions at the end of each book, numbers of στιχοι, scholia at the margin, and other matter – treatise of Pseudo-Dorotheus about 12 apostles and 72 disciples of Jesus (as codices 93, 177, 459, 613, 617, 699).

== Text ==
The Greek text of the codex is a representative of the Byzantine text-type. Aland placed it in Category V.

According to Scrivener its value in Apocalypse is considerable.

== History ==
The manuscript was examined and described by Wettstein, Scholz, and Paulin Martin. It was used by Westcott and Hort.

C. R. Gregory saw the manuscript in 1885.

Formerly it was labelled by 10^{a}, 12^{p}, and 2^{r}. In 1908 Gregory gave for it number 82.

It is currently housed in at the Bibliothèque nationale de France (Gr. 237), at Paris.

== See also ==
- List of New Testament minuscules
- Biblical manuscript
- Textual criticism
