= Minuscule 617 =

- New Testament manuscript
- Text: New Testament (except Gospels) †
- Date: 11th century
- Script: Greek
- Now at: Biblioteca Marciana
- Size: 30 cm by 23 cm
- Type: mixed
- Category: none
- Note: marginalia

Minuscule 617 (in the Gregory-Aland numbering), O ^{13} (von Soden), is a Greek minuscule manuscript of the New Testament, on parchment. Palaeographically it has been assigned to the 11th century. The manuscript is lacunose. Tischendorf labeled it by 140^{a}, 215^{p}, and 74^{r}.

== Description ==
The codex contains the text of the New Testament except Gospels on 164 parchment leaves (size 30 cm by 23 cm), with two large lacunae (Acts 1:8-19:12; Galatians 2:21-1 Timothy 4:10). The lacking texts were supplemented by two hands on paper in the 13th century. The text is written in two columns per page, 31 lines per page.

It contains Prolegomena, στιχοι, some notes to the Acts, and numerous notes to the Pauline and Catholic epistles. It has Euthalian Apparatus, but incomplete. The text of Epistles is surrounded by a catena, the Apocalypse has a commentary.

It contains treatise of Pseudo-Dorotheus on the Seventy disciples and twelve apostles (as codices 82, 93, 177, 459, 614, 699).

The order of books: Acts of the Apostles, Pauline epistles, Catholic epistles, and Book of Revelation. Hebrews is placed after Epistle to Philemon.

== Text ==
Kurt Aland did not place the Greek text of the codex in any Category.

== History ==
The manuscript belonged to the metropolitan of Ephesus Neophytus in 1481. It was bought for the library in "Gallicio" in 1624.

The manuscript was added to the list of New Testament manuscripts by Johann Martin Augustin Scholz. Gregory saw the manuscript in 1886. The text of the Apocalypse was collated by Herman C. Hoskier.

Formerly it was labeled by 140^{a}, 215^{p}, and 74^{r}. In 1908 Gregory gave the number 617 to it.

The manuscript currently is housed at the Biblioteca Marciana (Gr. Z. 546 (786)), at Venice.

== See also ==
- List of New Testament minuscules
- Biblical manuscript
- Textual criticism
