= Minuscule 459 =

- New Testament manuscript
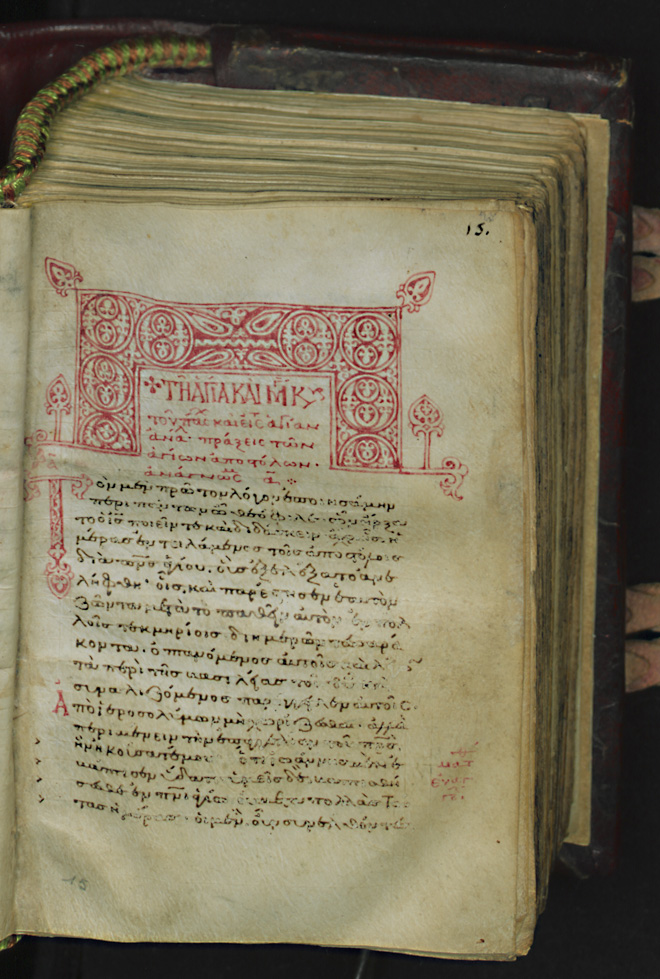
- Folio 15 recto
- Text: New Testament (except Gospels)
- Date: 1092
- Script: Greek
- Now at: Laurentian Library
- Size: 26 cm by 19.5 cm
- Type: mixed, Byzantine
- Category: III, V
- Hand: beautifully written

Minuscule 459 (in the Gregory-Aland numbering), α 104 (in the Soden numbering), is a Greek minuscule manuscript of the New Testament, on parchment. It is dated by a colophon to the year 1092. Formerly it was labeled by 89^{a} and 99^{p}.

== Description ==
The codex contains the text of the Acts of the Apostles, Catholic epistles, Pauline epistles, and Book of Revelation on 276 parchment leaves (26 cm by 19.5 cm). The text is written in one column per page, in 27 lines per page.

The biblical text is divided according to the κεφαλαια (chapters), whose numbers are given at the margin, and their τιτλοι (titles) at the top of the pages.

It contains Prolegomena, tables of the κεφαλαια (tables of contents) before each book, lectionary markings at the margin (for liturgical use), subscriptions at the end of each book, numbers of στιχοι, and treatise of Pseudo-Dorotheus on the Seventy disciples and twelve apostles (as codices 82, 93, 177, 613, 617).

The order of books: Acts, Catholic epistles, and Pauline epistles. The ending of the Epistle to the Romans has the order of verses: 16:23; 16:25-27; 16:24 (as in codices 025 33 104 256 263 365 436 1319 1573 1852 Peshitta arm).

== Text ==
The Greek text of the codex is a mixed in the Pauline epistles and the Byzantine text-type elsewhere. Aland placed it in Category III in the Pauline epistles and in Category V elsewhere.

== History ==
The manuscript was examined and slightly collated by Birch and Scholz. Antonio Maria Biscioni published its facsimile in 1752. C. R. Gregory saw it in 1886.

Formerly it was labeled by 89^{a} and 99^{p}. In 1908 Gregory gave the number 459 to it.

It is currently housed at the Laurentian Library (Plutei IV. 32) in Florence.

== See also ==
- List of New Testament minuscules
- Biblical manuscript
- Textual criticism
