= Minuscule 627 =

- New Testament manuscript
- Text: New Testament (except Gospels) †
- Date: 10th century
- Script: Greek
- Now at: Vatican Library
- Size: 27 cm by 20.5 cm
- Type: Byzantine text-type
- Category: V

Minuscule 627 (in the Gregory-Aland numbering), α 53 (von Soden), is a Greek minuscule manuscript of the New Testament, on parchment. Palaeographically it has been assigned to the 10th century. The manuscript is lacunose. Tischendorf labelled it by 160^{a}, 193^{p}, and 24^{r}. It has unusual order of books: the Book of Revelation is placed between Book of Acts and the Catholic epistles.

== Description ==
The codex contains the text of the New Testament except the four Gospels, on 187 parchment leaves (size 27 cm by 20.5 cm), with lacunae at the beginning and end (Acts 1:1-28:19; Hebrews 3:12-13:25). The text is written in one column per page, 26 lines per page.

The text is divided according to the κεφαλαια (chapters), whose numbers are given at the margin, and the τιτλοι (titles) at the top of the pages.

It contains subscriptions at the end of each book, with numbers of στιχοι, and scholia.

The order of books is unusual: Acts of the Apostles, Book of Revelation, Catholic epistles, Pauline epistles. The Epistle to the Hebrews is placed after the Epistle to Philemon. Minuscule 175 has the same sequence of the New Testament books, but it has the Gospels at the beginning of the codex.

== Text ==
The Greek text of the codex is a representative of the Byzantine text-type. Kurt Aland placed it in Category V.

== History ==
Scrivener dated the manuscript to the 11th century; Gregory, Aland and the INTF to the 10th century.

Formerly it was known as Basilian 101. The manuscript was examined and described by Giuseppe Bianchini. It was added to the list of New Testament manuscripts by Johann Martin Augustin Scholz, who slightly examined the whole manuscript. Gregory saw the manuscript in 1886.

Formerly it was labelled by 160^{a}, 193^{p}, and 24^{r}. In 1908 Gregory gave the number 627 to it. Herman C. Hoskier collated the text of the Apocalypse.

The manuscript is currently housed at the Vatican Library (Vat. gr. 2062), at Rome.

== See also ==
- List of New Testament minuscules
- Biblical manuscript
- Textual criticism
