= Saint Dorotheus =

Saint Dorotheus may refer to:

- Dorotheus of Gaza (505 – 565 or 620), Christian monk and abbot
- Dorotheus of Tyre (c. 255 – 362), traditionally credited with an Acts of the Seventy Apostles
