= Minuscule 450 =

- New Testament manuscript
- Text: Acts, Catholic epistles, Pauline epistles
- Date: 11th century
- Script: Greek
- Now at: Vatican Library
- Size: 25.5 cm by 18 cm
- Type: Byzantine text-type
- Category: V

Minuscule 450 (in the Gregory-Aland numbering), α 63 (in the Soden numbering), is a Greek minuscule manuscript of the New Testament, on parchment. Palaeographically it has been assigned to the 11th century. Formerly it was labelled by 78^{a} and 89^{p}. The manuscript is lacunose.

== Description ==
The codex contains the text of the Acts of the Apostles, Catholic epistles, and Pauline epistles on 177 parchment leaves (25.5 cm by 18 cm) with two lacunae (2 Corinthians 11:15-12:1; Ephesians 1:9-Hebrews 13:25). The text is written in one column per page, in 21 lines per page. The letters are written above lines.

It contains Prolegomena, the Euthalian Apparatus, subscriptions at the end of each book, and στιχοι.

The order of books: Acts, Catholic epistles, Pauline epistles.

== Text ==
The Greek text of the codex is a representative of the Byzantine text-type. Aland placed it in Category V.

== History ==
The manuscript is dated by the INTF to the 11th century.

The manuscript traced to Strasbourg in the possession of H. Boecler, and identified with 201. It was examined by Bianchini, Andreas Birch, Scholz, and Henry Stevenson. C. R. Gregory saw it in 1886.

The manuscript was added to the list of the New Testament manuscripts by Scholz (1794-1852).

Formerly it was labelled by 78^{a} and 89^{p}. In 1908 Gregory gave the number 450 to it.

It is currently housed at the Vatican Library (Vat. Reg. 29) in Rome.

== See also ==
- List of New Testament minuscules
- Biblical manuscript
- Textual criticism
