= Minuscule 632 =

- New Testament manuscript
- Text: New Testament (except Gospels)
- Date: 12th/14th century
- Script: Greek
- Now at: Biblioteca Vallicelliana
- Size: 17.5 cm by 12.4 cm
- Type: Byzantine text-type
- Category: V

Minuscule 632 (in the Gregory-Aland numbering), α 201 (von Soden), is a Greek minuscule manuscript of the New Testament, on parchment. Palaeographically it has been assigned to the 12th or 14th century. The manuscript is lacunose. Formerly it was labeled by 166^{a}, 204^{p}, and 22^{r}.

== Description ==
The codex contains the text of the New Testament except the four Gospels, on 258 parchment leaves (size 17.5 cm by 12.4 cm), with lacunae. The text is written in one column per page, 25-26 lines per page.

It contains Prolegomena, numbers of the κεφαλαια (chapters) at the margin, τιτλοι (titles) at the top of the pages, μαρτυριαι, subscriptions at the end of each book, and numbers of στιχοι.

The order of books: Acts of the Apostles, Catholic epistles, Pauline epistles, and Book of Revelation. Epistle to the Hebrews is placed before First Epistle to Timothy.

== Text ==
The Greek text of the codex is a representative of the Byzantine text-type. Kurt Aland placed it in Category V.

== History ==
The manuscript is dated by the INTF to the 12th or 14th century.

Some parts of the manuscript were written in different time by different scribes. The leaves 1-103 with text of Acts-Jude 24 were written in the 12th century; the leaves 104-191 with the text of Jude 24 - Colossians were written in the 13th century; the leaves 192-228 with the text 1 Thessalonians-Philemon were written in the 12th century; the leaves 229-254 with the text of the Apocalypse and scholia were written in the 14th century.

The leaf with the text of the Acts 1:1-13 was written in the 16th century.

The manuscript was examined and described by Giuseppe Bianchini. It was added to the list of New Testament manuscripts by Johann Martin Augustin Scholz, who slightly examined the manuscript. Gregory saw the manuscript in 1886. Herman C. Hoskier collated the text of the Apocalypse.

Formerly it was labeled by 166^{a}, 204^{p}, and 22^{r}. In 1908 Gregory gave the number 632 to it.

The manuscript currently is housed at the Biblioteca Vallicelliana (B. 86), at Rome.

== See also ==
- List of New Testament minuscules
- Biblical manuscript
- Textual criticism
