= Méditation (Thaïs) =

Composition from the opera Thaïs by Jules Massenet

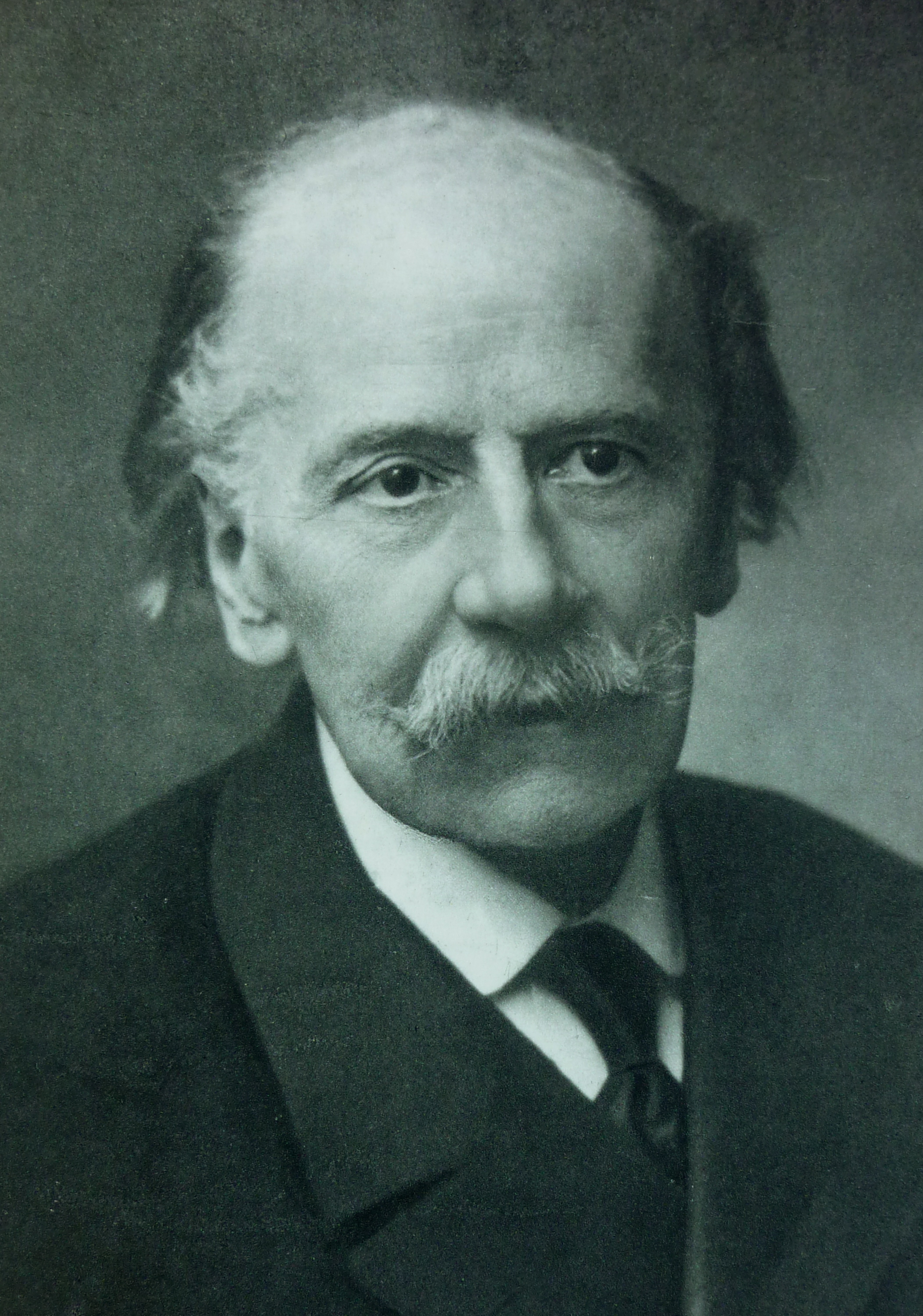
Jules Massenet photographed by Nadar

"Méditation" (pronounced [meditasjɔ̃]) is a symphonic intermezzo from the opera Thaïs by French composer Jules Massenet. The piece is written for solo violin, orchestra and backstage chorus. The opera premiered at the Opéra Garnier in Paris on March 16, 1894.

== Description ==
"Méditation" performed in 2018
Violinist: Bomsori Kim; pianist: Pallavi Mahidhara

"Méditation" performed in 1919
Violinist: Mischa Elman; pianist: Josef Bonime

The Méditation is an instrumental entr'acte performed between the scenes of Act II in the opera Thaïs; a wordless chorus joins in for the last reprise. In the first scene of Act II, Athanaël, a Cenobite monk, confronts Thaïs, a beautiful and hedonistic courtesan and devotée of Venus, and attempts to persuade her to leave her life of luxury and pleasure and find salvation through God. It is during a time of reflection following the encounter that the Méditation occurs. In the second scene of Act II, following the Méditation, Thaïs tells Athanaël that she will let him take her to a cloister near the desert.

Ernest Newman commented that the "solo is almost invariably made far more sickly than it need be or should be", continuing "What concern of [the violinist] is dramatic psychology?", and that the piece sometimes becomes "not merely saccharine but maudlin". He noted that the themes have already been heard; Rodney Milnes identifies that the music "derives both from Athanaël's erotic visions and part of his hymn".

The piece is in D major and is approximately five to six minutes long. Massenet may also have written the piece with religious intentions; the tempo marking is Andante religioso, signifying his intention that it should be played religiously (which could mean either strictly in the tempo or literally with religiously founded emotion) and at walking tempo, or around 60 BPM. The piece opens with a short introduction by the harps, with the solo violin quickly entering with the motif. After the violin plays the melody twice, the piece goes into a section marked animato, gradually becoming more and more passionate (Massenet wrote poco a poco appassionato). The climax is reached at a place marked poco piu appassionato (a little more passion) and is then followed by a short cadenza-like passage from the soloist and returns to the main theme. After the theme is played twice, the soloist joins the orchestra while playing harmonics on the upper register as the harps and strings quietly play below the solo line.

== Orchestration ==
The piece calls for solo violin, two flutes, two oboes, English horn, clarinet, bass clarinet, bassoon, contrabassoon, 2 horns, SATB chorus, two harps and strings. The solo violin part is generally played by the orchestra's concertmaster in an opera setting, or by a featured soloist standing in front of the orchestra in a concert setting. The SATB chorus is indicated by Massenet to be sung by the entire chorus from behind the curtain in an opera setting, and by four to eight soloists seated among the orchestra in a concert setting. Other arrangements have also been made, such as the variation for the violin and piano.

== Performers and adaptations ==
The Méditation from Thaïs is considered to be one of the great encore pieces; many violinists have performed the piece as soloists with major orchestras throughout the world. The Méditation has been transcribed for violin and piano and for other instruments as well. Massenet made an arrangement of the Méditation for voice and keyboard in 1894 as an Ave Maria, which a contemporary critic Camille Bellaigue noted had even been introduced into marriage services. Examples of other arrangements include a version for cello and piano by Jules Delsart; the flautist James Galway, the euphoniumist Adam Frey, and trumpeter Sergei Nakariakov have recorded separate versions on their respective instruments, each with orchestral accompaniment. Jazz bass saxophonist Adrian Rollini quoted the opening bars of the melody in a 1925 recording of 'Milenburg Joys' with the Varsity Eight, although he did play it in the key of D-flat major, a semitone lower than the original composition.

== Choreography ==
The British choreographer Frederick Ashton created a balletic pas de deux from the Méditation. Premiered on 21 March 1971, the piece was first danced by Antoinette Sibley and Anthony Dowell of The Royal Ballet and at the Adelphi Theatre, London, as part of a gala performance. The piece, created in only two rehearsals is not related to the plot of the opera, but resembles a vision scene, with Sibley appearing as "a disembodied, weightless spirit", and features costumes designed by Dowell. It was so well received at its first performance that Ashton asked the audience if they would like an encore (which they did), and Marie Rambert considered it one of Ashton's three masterpieces (along with Symphonic Variations and La fille mal gardée). A recording of the piece from 2004 has been issued on DVD, and by 2013 the work had been performed 45 times, in London and on tour elsewhere, by Royal Ballet dancers.

== Selected recordings ==
According to the Centre for the History and Analysis of Recorded Music (CHARM) database, several recordings were made during the composer's lifetime, including ones by Jacques Thibaud, Georg Sadler and Louis Phal in 1905, Alessandro Genesini in 1908, and Fritz Kreisler in 1910 (his first). Later recordings include:

- 1960 – John Georgiadis – London Symphony Orchestra – London Records
- 1985 – Ivry Gitlis – Shigeo Neriki – EMI Classics
- 1988 – Nadja Salerno-Sonnenberg – Gerard Schwarz, New York Chamber Symphony – EMI Classics
- 1993 - Anne Akiko Meyers - Philharmonia Orchestra - RCA Red Seal
- 1993 – Anne-Sophie Mutter – Vienna Philharmonic – Deutsche Grammophon
- 1996 – James Galway – National Philharmonic Orchestra – RCA
- 1999 – Linda Brava – John Lenehan – EMI Classics
- 2001 – Maxim Vengerov, Vag Papian – EMI
- 2002 – Sarah Chang – Berliner Philharmonic – EMI
- 2003 – Yo-Yo Ma, Kathryn Stott – EMI
- 2004 – Joshua Bell – Royal Philharmonic Orchestra – Decca
- 2009 – Nicola Benedetti – London Symphony Orchestra – Decca

== Sources ==
- Wagner, Paul. "Thaïs: An Opera by Jules Massenet". Music with Ease.
- "Synopsis of Thaïs". Metropolitan Opera.
- "Thaïs: performance on violin in videoclip". Evelien Graat (violinist).
- Aguinaga, Idara. "Méditation (Thaïs): Live "Concert Performance" on Violin - Videoclip". Idara Aguinaga (violinist).
- Vaughan, David. Frederick Ashton and his Ballets, Dance Books, London, 1999.
