= Minuscule 176 =

- New Testament manuscript
- Text: Gospels †
- Date: 13th century
- Script: Greek
- Now at: Vatican Library
- Size: 21.2 cm by 14.5 cm
- Type: Byzantine text-type
- Category: none
- Note: marginalia

Minuscule 176 (in the Gregory-Aland numbering), ε 301 (Soden), is a Greek minuscule manuscript of the New Testament, on parchment. Palaeographically it has been assigned to the 13th century. It has marginalia.

== Description ==
The codex contains the text of the four Gospels on 77 parchment leaves (size 21.2 cm by 14.5 cm), with two large lacunae (Matthew 1:1-10:13; John 2:1-21:25). The text is written in two columns per page, in 38 lines per page (size of column 17.1 by 5 cm), in dark-brown ink, the capital letters in colour.

The text is divided according to the κεφαλαια (chapters), whose numbers are given at the margin, and the τιτλοι (titles of chapters) at the top of the pages. There is also a division according to the Ammonian Sections, (no references to the Eusebian Canons).

It contains and lectionary markings at the margin for liturgical use.

== Text ==
The Greek text of the codex is a representative of the Byzantine text-type. Hermann von Soden included it to the textual family K^{x}. Aland did not place it in any Category. According to the Claremont Profile Method it represents textual family K^{x} in Luke 10. In Luke 1 and Luke 20 it has mixed text. It creates textual pair with minuscule 165, related to the group 22.

== History ==
This codex, along with codices 173, 174, 175, and 177, was brought from the Library of the Basilian monks.

It was examined by Bianchini, Birch (about 1782), and Scholz. C. R. Gregory saw it in 1886.

It is currently housed at the Vatican Library (Vat. gr. 2113), at Rome.

== See also ==
- List of New Testament minuscules
- Biblical manuscript
- Textual criticism
