= Minuscule 173 =

Greek minuscule manuscript of the New Testament

- New Testament manuscript
- Text: Gospels †
- Date: 12th century
- Script: Greek
- Now at: Vatican Library
- Size: 20 cm by 13.3 cm
- Type: Byzantine
- Category: none
- Note: marginalia

Minuscule 173 (in the Gregory-Aland numbering), ε 209 (Soden), is a Greek minuscule manuscript of the New Testament, on parchment. Palaeographically it has been assigned to the 12th century. It has marginalia.

== Description ==
The codex contains the text of the four Gospels on 155 thick parchment leaves (size 20 cm by 13.3 cm), with a large lacunae in the fourth Gospel (John 12:1-21:25). It contains numerous itacistic errors.

The text is written in two columns per page, in 20 lines per page, in brown-black ink.

The text is divided according to the κεφαλαια (chapters), whose numbers are given at the margin, and their τιτλοι (titles of chapters) at the top of the pages. There is also a division according to the Ammonian Sections, but without references to the Eusebian Canons.

It contains the Epistula ad Carpianum, Eusebian Canon tables at the beginning, tables of the κεφαλαια (tables of contents) before each Gospel, lectionary markings at the margin (for liturgical use), Menologion, subscriptions at the end of each Gospel, with numbers of ρηματα, and numbers of στιχοι.

== Text ==
The Greek text of the codex is representative of the Byzantine text-type. According to Hermann von Soden it belongs to the textual family K^{x}. Aland did not place it in any Category. According to the Claremont Profile Method its text is mixed in Luke 1 and Luke 10. In Luke 20 it represents family Λ. It has some relationship to the textual group 1216.

== History ==
This codex, together with 174, 175, 176, and 177, was brought from the Library of the Basilian monks.

It was examined by Bianchini, Birch (about 1782), and Scholz. C. R. Gregory saw it in 1886.

It is currently housed at the Vatican Library (Vat. gr. 1983), at Rome.

== See also ==
- List of New Testament minuscules
- Biblical manuscript
- Textual criticism
