= Camille Bellaigue =

French music critic and musicologist

Camille Bellaigue (May 24, 1858 – October 3, 1930) was a French music critic and musicologist. He wrote one of the first biographies in French of Giuseppe Verdi, dedicating it to Arrigo Boito.

== Biography ==
The grandson of Claude Bellaigue and René Pierson, and son of Antonin Bellaigue, Camille Bellaigue was born on May 24, 1858, in Paris.

A student of Antoine François Marmontel, he obtained a first prize in piano at the Paris Conservatory in 1878. He worked as a musical journalist, first at Le Correspondant, later joining the Revue des deux Mondes in 1885, where he wrote numerous musical reviews . Described as "an elegant but superficial writer," his writing is characterized by a hostility toward the then-new musical styles of composers like Cesar Franck and Claude Debussy, and his enthusiasm for older composers like Charles Gounod.

In 1884, the French Academy awarded him the Vitet prize in 1894 for his book Psychologie musicale, which he published the previous year with Delgrave.

A follower of Charles Maurras and a Papal gentleman to Pius X, he married the niece of Herman Hoskier. His daughter, Marie-Élisabeth Bellaigue, married the French politician Jacques Vendroux and was a close friend of Yvonne de Gaulle. He died in Paris on October 3, 1930.

Bellaigue also worked as piano and voice teacher. He taught singing to Wilfrid Pelletier and also coached him on piano in the French operatic repertoire.
