= Minuscule 174 =

- New Testament manuscript
- Text: Gospels †
- Date: 1052
- Script: Greek
- Now at: Vatican Library
- Size: 24.6 cm by 19 cm
- Type: Caesarean text-type
- Category: none
- Note: member of ƒ^{13}

Minuscule 174 is a Greek minuscule manuscript of the New Testament Gospels, written on parchment. It is designated by the siglum 174 in the Gregory-Aland numbering of New Testament manuscripts, and ε109 in the von Soden numbering of New Testament manuscripts. It is dated by a colophon to the year 1052 CE.

== Description ==
The manuscript is a codex (the precursor to the modern book format), containing the text of the four Gospels on 132 thick parchment leaves (size 24.6 cm by 19 cm), with three gaps (Matthew 1:1-2:1; John 1:1-27; 8:47-21:25). The text is written in two columns, 30 lines per page (text-block size 18.2 cm by 6.5 cm), in brown-red ink, with the capital letters in red. It has marginal notes.

The text is divided according to the chapters (known as κεφαλαια / kephalaia), whose numbers are given in the margin, and their titles (τιτλοι / titloi) at the top of the pages. There is also a division according to the Ammonian Sections, with references to the Eusebian Canons written below Ammonian Section numbers (an early system of dividing the four Gospels into different sections).

It contains tables of contents (also known as κεφαλαια / kephalaia) before each Gospel, lectionary markings in the margin for liturgical use, and subscriptions at the end of each of Gospel. The subscriptions contain the numbers of phrases (ρηματα / rhemata) and numbers of lines (στιχοι / stichoi).

== Text ==
The Greek text of the codex has been considered a representative of the Caesarean text-type. The text-types are groups of different New Testament manuscripts which share specific or generally related readings, which then differ from each other group, and thus the conflicting readings can separate out the groups. These are then used to determine the original text as published; there are three main groups with names: Alexandrian, Western, and Byzantine. The Caesarean text-type however (initially identified by biblical scholar Burnett Hillman Streeter) has been contested by several text-critics, such as Kurt and Barbara Aland. The manuscript is a member of textual Family 13, also known as the Ferrar Group/Family. Kurt Aland did not place it in any Category among his New Testament manuscript text classification system.

According to the Claremont Profile Method (a specific analysis method of textual data), it represents textual group Λ in Luke 1, Luke 10, and Luke 20.

== History ==
The manuscript was written by the monk Constantine "tabernis habitante" (living in a tavern), "cum praessent praefecturae Georgilas dux Calabriae" (when Georgilas, Duke of Calabria, presided over the prefectures). The codex, together with 173, 175, 176, and 177, was brought from the Library of the Basilian monks.

It was examined by textual scholars Giuseppe Bianchini, Andreas Birch (about 1782), Johan M. A. Scholz, James Rendel Harris, and William Hugh Ferrar. Biblical scholar Caspar René Gregory saw it in 1886. It is currently housed at the Vatican Library (Vat. gr. 2002), at Rome.

== See also ==
- List of New Testament minuscules
- Minuscule 13
- Biblical manuscript
- Textual criticism
