= Lectionary 36 =

Lectionary ℓ 36
- New Testament manuscript
- Text: Evangelistarion
- Date: 10th-century
- Script: Greek
- Now at: Vatican Library
- Size: 34 cm by 25.2 cm

Lectionary 36, designated by siglum ℓ 36 (in the Gregory-Aland numbering). It is a Greek manuscript of the New Testament, on parchment leaves. Palaeographically it has been assigned to the 10th-century.

== Description ==
The codex contains lessons from the Gospels of John, Matthew, Luke lectionary (Evangelistarium), with lacunae. It is written in Greek uncial letters, on 268 parchment leaves (34 cm by 25.2 cm), in two columns per page, in 21 lines per page, 13 letters per page.

== History ==
The manuscript was examined by Giuseppe Bianchini, Italian palaeographer, and Andreas Birch, Danish palaeographer.

The manuscript is sporadically cited in the critical editions of the Greek New Testament (UBS3).

Currently the codex is located in the Vatican Library (Vat. Gr. 1067) in Rome.

== See also ==
- List of New Testament lectionaries
- Biblical manuscript
- Textual criticism
