= Minuscule 175 =

- New Testament manuscript
- Name: Cod. Vaticanus gr. 2080
- Text: New Testament †
- Date: 12th century
- Script: Greek
- Now at: Vatican Library
- Size: 20.2 cm by 14.5 cm
- Category: none
- Note: marginalia

Minuscule 175 (in the Gregory-Aland numbering), δ 95 (Soden), is a Greek minuscule manuscript of the New Testament, on parchment. Palaeographically it has been assigned to the 12th century. It has marginalia.

== Description ==
The codex contains almost complete text of the New Testament on 247 parchment leaves (size 20.2 cm by 14.5 cm), with only one lacuna (Matthew 1:1-4:17).

The text is written in one column per page, in 35–37 lines per page (size of text 16.9 by 10.5 cm), in brown ink.

The Book of Revelation is placed between Acts of the Apostles and Catholic epistles (see Minuscule 627). The Pauline epistles follow Catholic epistles. It contains scholia to the Acts, some marginal corrections made by prima manu (e.g. Luke 24:13). The Pauline epistles have the Euthalian subscriptions. It has margin notes in uncial script to the Acts of Apostles.

== Text ==
According to Hermann von Soden in the Acts and epistles the text of the manuscript is a representative of the Byzantine text-type. Kurt Aland did not place it in any Category. According to the Claremont Profile Method it represents textual family Π^{a} in Luke 1, Luke 10, and Luke 20.

== History ==
This codex, together with 173, 174, 176, and 177, was brought from the Library of the Basilian monks.

It was examined by Bianchini, Birch (about 1782), and Scholz. C. R. Gregory saw the manuscript in 1886.

It is currently housed at the Vatican Library (Vat. gr. 2080), at Rome.

== See also ==
- List of New Testament minuscules
- Biblical manuscript
- Textual criticism
