= Minuscule 165 =

Manuscript of the New Testament

- New Testament manuscript
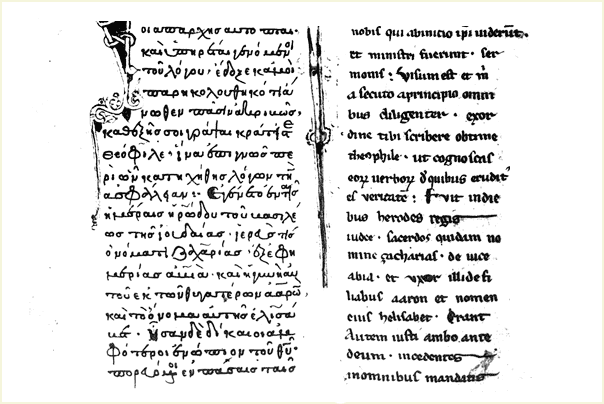
- beginning of the Gospel of Luke
- Name: Codex Barberinianus 14
- Text: Gospels
- Date: 1292
- Script: Greek-Latin
- Now at: Vatican Library
- Size: 30.4 cm by 20.4 cm
- Type: Byzantine/mixed
- Category: none
- Note: marginalia

Minuscule 165 (in the Gregory-Aland numbering), ε 1320 (Soden), is a Greek-Latin minuscule manuscript of the New Testament, on parchment. It is dated by its colophon to the year 1292. It has complex contents. It has marginalia.

== Description ==
The codex contains a complete text of the four Gospels on 214 thick parchment leaves (size 30.4 cm by 20.4 cm). The text is written in two columns per page, in 33 lines per page.

The text is divided according to the κεφαλαια (chapters), whose numbers are given at the margin, and their τιτλοι (titles of chapters) at the top of the page (partly from later hand). There is also another division according to the smaller Ammonian Sections (in Mark 236 sections, the last in 16:12), with references to the Eusebian Canons (written below Ammonian Section numbers).

It contains the Epistula ad Carpianum, the Eusebian Canon tables at the beginning, tables of the κεφαλαια (tables of contents) before each Gospel, and Synaxarion (liturgical book).

== Text ==
The Greek text of the codex is a representative of the Byzantine text-type. Hermann von Soden classified it to the textual family K^{x}. Aland did not place it in any Category.

According to the Claremont Profile Method it represents textual family K^{x} in Luke 10. In Luke 1 and Luke 20 it has mixture of the Byzantine text-families. It creates textual pair with Minuscule 176, related to the group 22.

The Pericope Adulterae (John 7:53-8:11) is marked by an obelus as doubtful.

== History ==
The manuscript was probably written in Calabria. The subscription states that it was written by Romanus for one Archbishop Paul, and given to the Library by Eugenia, daughter of John Pontanus († 1503).

It was examined by Birch (about 1782), Scholz (1794-1852), Victor Gardthausen. C. R. Gregory saw it in 1886.

It is currently housed at the Vatican Library (Barb. gr. 541), at Rome.

== See also ==
- List of New Testament minuscules
- Biblical manuscript
- Textual criticism
