= Lectionary 126 =

Lectionary ℓ 126
- New Testament manuscript
- Text: Evangelistarion
- Date: 11th century
- Script: Greek
- Now at: Vatican Library
- Size: 31 cm by 22.8 cm

Lectionary 126, designated by siglum ℓ 126 (in the Gregory-Aland numbering) is a Greek manuscript of the New Testament, on parchment leaves. Palaeographically it has been assigned to the 11th century.

== Description ==
The codex contains lessons from the Gospels of John, Matthew, Luke lectionary (Evangelistarium), on 337 parchment leaves (31 cm by 22.8 cm). The text is written in Greek minuscule letters, in two columns per page, 23 lines per page. It contains the Pericope Adulterae (John 8:3-11).

== History ==
The manuscript was written by one George. The manuscript was added to the list of New Testament manuscripts by Scholz. It was examined by Bianchini, Scholz, Gregory.

The manuscript is not cited in the critical editions of the Greek New Testament (UBS3).

Currently the codex is located in the Vatican Library (Vat. gr. 2041) in Rome.

== See also ==
- List of New Testament lectionaries
- Biblical manuscript
- Textual criticism

== Bibliography ==
- G. Bianchini, Evangeliarium quadruplex latinae versionis antiquae seu veteris italicae (Rome, 1749), part 1, vol. 2, p. 517.
- J. M. A. Scholz, Biblisch-kritische Reise in Frankreich, der Schweiz, Italien, Palästine und im Archipel in den Jahren 1818, 1819, 1820, 1821: Nebst einer Geschichte des Textes des Neuen Testaments, p. 102 f.
- Codinus Curopalates, De officialibus Ausg. v. Bekker, Bonn 1839, p. 251.
