= Pseudo-Dorotheus =

A number of late 3rd-century Christian works are pseudepigraphically attributed to Dorotheus of Tyre. These works describe the lives of the Apostles and their disciples, including tradition about Barnabas living in Rome.
