= Lectionary 35 =

Lectionary ℓ 35
- New Testament manuscript
- Name: Codex Vaticanus Graecus 351
- Text: Evangelistarion
- Date: 11th-century
- Script: Greek
- Now at: Vatican Library
- Size: 33.8 cm by 25 cm

Lectionary 35, designated by siglum ℓ 35 (in the Gregory-Aland numbering), is a Greek manuscript of the New Testament, on parchment leaves. Palaeographically it has been assigned to the 11th-century.

== Description ==
The codex contains lessons from the Gospels of John, Matthew, Luke lectionary (Evangelistarium), with lacunae. It is written in Greek uncial letters, on 151 parchment leaves (33.8 cm by 25 cm), one column per page, in 11 lines per page. It contains only the lessons for holidays

== History ==
It was examined by Bianchini and Birch. C. R. Gregory saw it in 1886.

The manuscript is not cited in the critical editions of the Greek New Testament (UBS3).

Currently the codex is located in the Vatican Library (Vat. Gr. 351) in Rome.

== See also ==
- List of New Testament lectionaries
- Biblical manuscript
- Textual criticism

== Bibliography ==
- G. Bianchini, Evangeliarium quadruplex latinae versionis antiquae seu veteris italicae (Rome, 1749), 1. Part, 2. vol., p. 504.
