= Lectionary 125 =

Lectionary ℓ 125
- New Testament manuscript
- Text: Evangelistarion
- Date: 11th century
- Script: Greek
- Now at: Vatican Library
- Size: 22.1 cm by 16.7 cm

Lectionary 125, designated by siglum ℓ 125 (in the Gregory-Aland numbering) is a Greek manuscript of the New Testament, on parchment leaves. Palaeographically it has been assigned to the 11th century.

== Description ==
The codex contains lessons from the Gospels of John, Matthew, Luke lectionary (Evangelistarium), on 123 parchment leaves (22.1 cm by 16.7 cm). Some parts of the codex were lost, in result its text is lacunose. The text is written in Greek minuscule letters, in two columns per page, 23 lines per page. It contains the Pericope Adulterae (John 8:3-11).

It contains subscription with date 1346, and a memorandum of the death (October 12, 1345) and burial of one Constantia.

== History ==
The manuscript was added to the list of New Testament manuscripts by Scholz. It was examined by Bianchini.

The manuscript is not cited in the critical editions of the Greek New Testament (UBS3).

Currently the codex is located in the Vatican Library (Vat. gr. 2017) in Rome.

== See also ==
- List of New Testament lectionaries
- Biblical manuscript
- Textual criticism

== Bibliography ==
- Bianchini, Evangeliarium quadruplex latinae versionis antiquae seu veteris italicae (Rome, 1749), part 1, vol. 2, p. 518.
