= Minuscule 145 =

Greek minuscule manuscript of the New Testament

- New Testament manuscript
- Text: Luke, John
- Date: 11th century
- Script: Greek
- Now at: Vatican Library
- Size: 17.6 cm by 13 cm
- Type: Byzantine text-type
- Category: none
- Note: full marginalia

Minuscule 145 (in the Gregory-Aland numbering), ε 101 (Soden), is a Greek minuscule manuscript of the New Testament, on parchment leaves. Paleographically it has been assigned to the 11th century. It has full marginalia.

== Description ==
The codex contains the text of the Gospel of Luke and Gospel of John on 161 thick parchment leaves (size 17.6 cm by 13 cm), with some lacunae (Luke 4:15-5:36; John 1:1-26).

The text is written in one column per page, 17 lines per page. The text is divided according to the κεφαλαια (chapters), whose numbers are given at the margin of the text, and their τιτλοι (titles of chapters) at the top of the pages. There is also another division according to the smaller Ammonian Sections, whose numbers are given at the margin, with references to the Eusebian Canons (written below Ammonian Section numbers).

It contains Prolegomena of Kosmas, tables of the κεφαλαια (tables of contents) before each Gospel, lectionary markings at the margin (for liturgical use), and pictures.

The text of Luke 17-21 has many corrections made by the hand of Presbyter Nikolaus.

== Text ==
The Greek text of the codex is a representative of the Byzantine text-type. Hermann von Soden classified it to the textual family K^{x}. Kurt Aland did not place it in any Category. According to the Claremont Profile Method it represents Π^{a} in Luke 1 and Luke 10. In Luke 20 it has mixed text.

The spurious text of John 5:4 is marked by an obelus. The Pericope Adulterae (John 7:53-8:11) has annotation that many manuscripts do not contain this pericope.

== History ==
The manuscript was presented by Maximilian of Bavarian to Urban VIII, a Pole (1623–1644).

It was examined by Bianchini, Birch (about 1782), and Scholz. C. R. Gregory saw the manuscript in 1886.

It is currently housed at the Vatican Library (Vat. gr. 1548), at Rome.

== See also ==
- List of New Testament minuscules
- Biblical manuscript
- Textual criticism
