= First Epistle to the Thessalonians =

Book of the New Testament

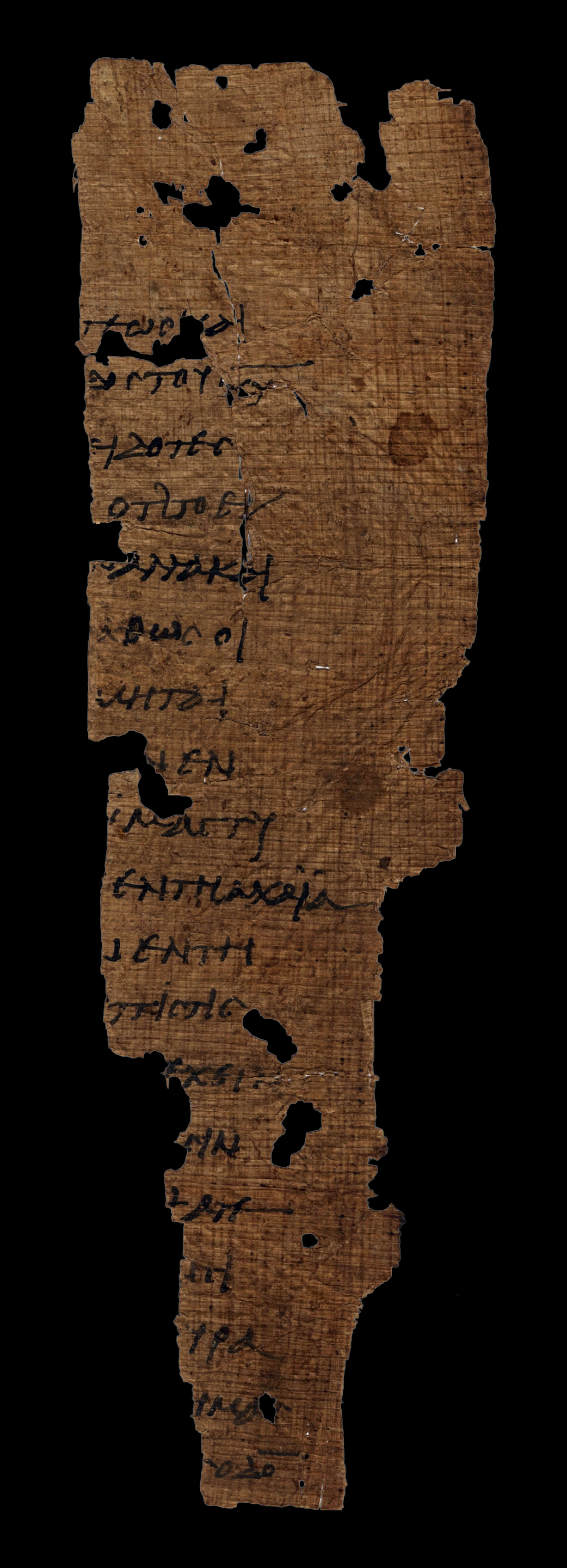
1 Thessalonians 1:3–2:1 on Papyrus 65 (recto; c. AD 250)

The First Epistle to the Thessalonians (Note: The book is sometimes called the First Letter of Paul to the Thessalonians, or simply 1 Thessalonians. It is most commonly abbreviated as "1 Thess.") is a Pauline epistle of the New Testament of the Christian Bible. The epistle is attributed to Paul the Apostle, and is addressed to the church in Thessalonica, in modern-day Greece.

1 Thessalonians is a letter written by the Apostle Paul to the early Christian community in Thessalonica within the Roman Empire. Paul had visited the city, preached the gospel, and gained converts, many of whom were likely Gentiles. It is usually dated around 49–51 AD during Paul's stay in Corinth, making it one of the earliest surviving Christian texts. Some early manuscripts, however, suggest it may have been written from Athens after Timothy returned with news about the Thessalonian church.

The original manuscript has not survived, but several early copies remain, including Papyrus 46 (around AD 200), Papyrus 65 (3rd century), and codices such as Vaticanus, Sinaiticus, and Alexandrinus. Most scholars regard the letter as authentically Pauline because its style and theology align with his other writings, and its authorship is affirmed by 2 Thessalonians, although certain passages, particularly 2:13–16 and 5:1–11, are debated.

The letter emphasizes encouragement, ethical guidance, and hope over theological disputes. Paul expresses gratitude for the Thessalonians' faith and love, reminding them of his honorable conduct and efforts not to burden them financially during his visit. He instructs them on living harmoniously, coping with grief, and preparing for Christ's return, reassuring faith in the resurrection of the dead.

== Background and audience ==
Thessalonica is a city on the Thermaic Gulf, which at the time of Paul was within the Roman Empire. Paul visited Thessalonica and preached to the local population, winning converts who became a Christian community. There is debate as to whether or not Paul's converts were originally Jewish. The Acts of the Apostles describes Paul preaching in a Jewish synagogue and persuading people who were already Jewish that Jesus was the Messiah, but in 1 Thessalonians itself Paul says that the converts had turned from idols, suggesting that they were not Jewish before Paul arrived.

Most New Testament scholars believe Paul wrote this letter from Corinth only months after he left Thessalonica, although information appended to this work in many early manuscripts (e.g., Codices Alexandrinus, Mosquensis, and Angelicus) state that Paul wrote it in Athens after Timothy had returned from Macedonia with news of the state of the church in Thessalonica.

== Oldest surviving manuscripts ==
The original manuscript of this letter is lost, as are over a century of copies. The text of the surviving manuscripts varies. The oldest surviving manuscripts that contain some or all of this book include:

- Papyrus 46 (c. AD 200)
- Papyrus 65 (3rd century)
- Codex Vaticanus (325–350)
- Codex Sinaiticus (330–360)
- Codex Alexandrinus (400–440)
- Codex Ephraemi Rescriptus (c. 450)
- Codex Freerianus (c. 450)
- Codex Claromontanus (c. 550)

== Composition ==
=== Date ===
It is widely agreed that 1 Thessalonians is one of the first books of the New Testament to be written, and the earliest extant Christian text. A majority of modern New Testament scholars date the letter to 49–51 AD, during Paul's 18-month stay in Corinth coinciding with his second missionary journey. The reference to proconsul Gallio in the inscription provides an important marker for developing a chronology of the life of Apostle Paul, since he presides over the trial of Paul in Achaea mentioned in the Acts of the Apostles (Acts 18:12–17).

1 Thessalonians does not focus on justification by faith or questions of Jewish–Gentile relations, themes that are covered in all other letters. Because of this, some scholars see this as an indication that this letter was written before the Epistle to the Galatians, where Paul's positions on these matters were formed and elucidated.

=== Authenticity ===
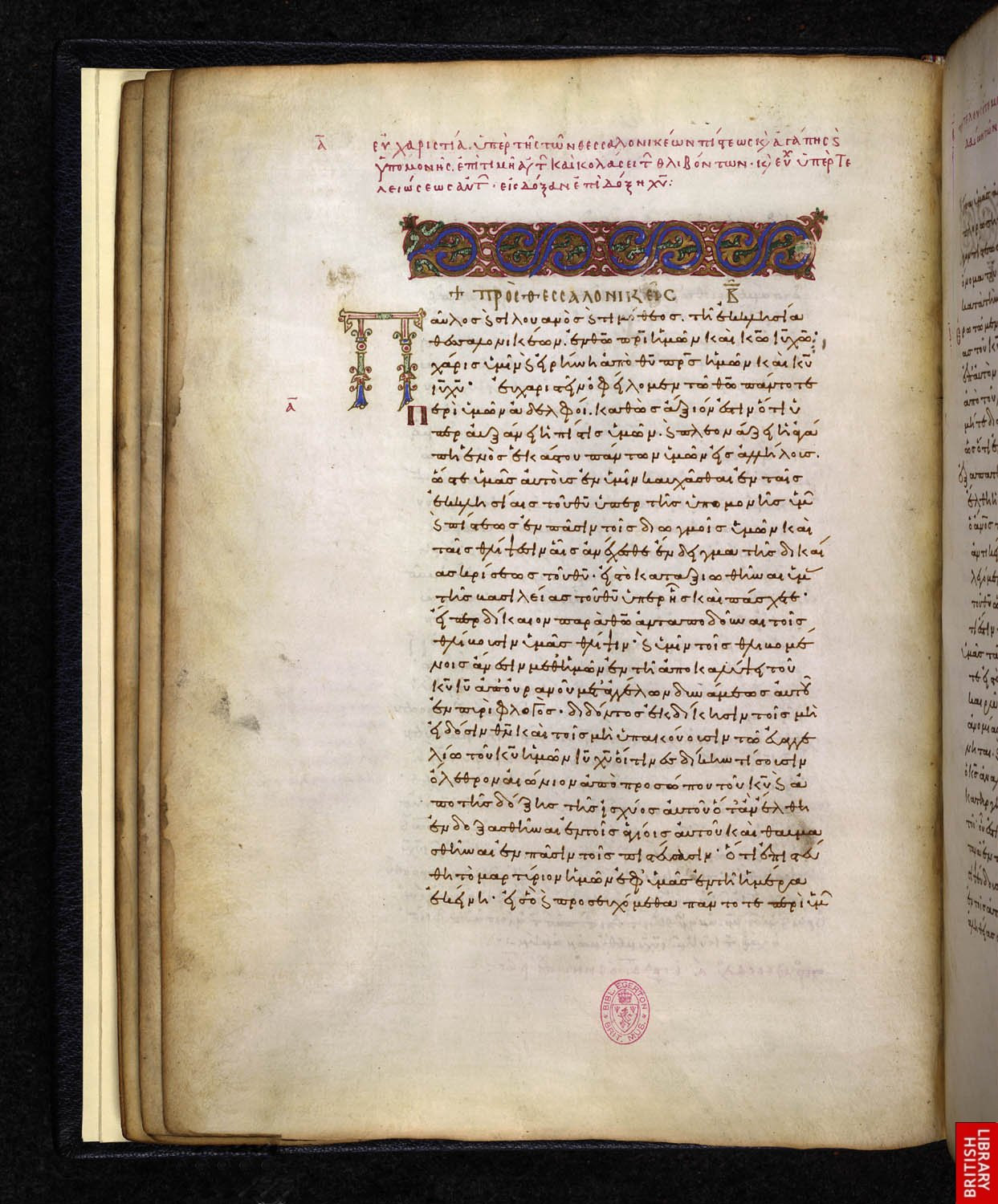
The first page of the epistle in Minuscule 699 gives its title as προς θεσσαλονικεις, "To the Thessalonians."

The majority of New Testament scholars hold 1 Thessalonians to be authentic, although a number of scholars in the mid-19th century contested its authenticity, most notably Clement Schrader and F.C. Baur. 1 Thessalonians matches other accepted Pauline letters, both in style and in content, and its authorship is also affirmed by 2 Thessalonians.

The authenticity of 1 Thessalonians 2:13–16 has been extensively discussed. An interpolation hypothesis was proposed in the past based mostly on internal arguments on the text such as antisemitic, grammatical, or time period approximation concerns. However, since the late 20th century, the scholarly consensus view is that the passage is authentically Pauline for multiple reasons such as: there is no manuscript evidence of these verses missing and no alternative placement either, rhetorical connection between verse 13 and 14 makes it clear that these verses are not out of place, Paul in other letters such as Romans believed God's wrath was being manifested in the present, Paul was writing to Thessalonians (which included non-Jews) when he wrote about "Jews" in this letter, and Paul wrote in a diverse fashion not in a censored modern-anachronistic fashion.

It is also sometimes suggested that 1 Thessalonians 5:1–11 is a post-Pauline insertion that has many features of Lukan language and theology that serves as an apologetic correction to Paul's imminent expectation of the Second Coming in 1 Thessalonians 4:13–18. Some scholars, such as Schmithals, Eckhart, Demke and Munro, have developed complex theories involving redaction and interpolation in 1 and 2 Thessalonians.

== Contents ==
=== Outline ===
1. (1:1–10) Salutation and thanksgiving
2. (2:1–20) Past interactions with the church
3. (3:1–13) Regarding Timothy's visit
4. (4:1–5:25) Specific issues within the church
  1. (4:1–12) Relationships among Christians
  2. (4:13–18) Mourning those who have died
  3. (5:1–11) Preparing for God's arrival
  4. (5:12–25) How Christians should behave
5. (5:26–28) Closing salutation

=== Text ===
Paul, speaking for himself, Silas, and Timothy, gives thanks for the news about the Thessalonians' faith and love; he reminds them of the kind of life he had lived while he was with them. Paul stresses how honorably he conducted himself, reminding them that he had worked to earn his keep, taking great pains not to burden anyone. He did this, he says, even though he could have used his status as an apostle to impose upon them.

Paul goes on to explain that the dead will be resurrected prior to those still living, and both groups will greet the Lord in the air. Paul believed at the time of composition that he would be among the living who would experience the Second Coming, though he would go on to consider the possibility of death prior to Jesus' return later in life. Hays argues for a contingent eschatology in the Pauline epistles where God withholds judgment to give time for repentance, also found in Jesus and the Synoptics.

== See also ==
- Authorship of the Pauline epistles
- Imitation of Christ
- Second Epistle to the Thessalonians

== Notes ==
First Epistle to the Thessalonians Pauline Epistle
Preceded by Colossians	New Testament; Books of the Bible	Succeeded by Second Thessalonians
