= Lectionary 124 =

Lectionary ℓ 124
- New Testament manuscript
- Text: Evangelistarion
- Date: 12th century
- Script: Greek
- Now at: Vatican Library
- Size: 19.9 cm by 14.7 cm

Lectionary 124, designated by siglum ℓ 124 (in the Gregory-Aland numbering) is a Greek manuscript of the New Testament, on parchment leaves. Palaeographically it has been assigned to the 12th century.

== Description ==
The codex contains lessons from the Gospels of John, Matthew, Luke lectionary (Evangelistarium) with lacunae at the beginning and end. The manuscript contains 162 parchment leaves (19.9 cm by 14.7 cm). The text is written in Greek minuscule letters, in two columns per page, 24 lines per page. It contains pictures.

== History ==
The manuscript was added to the list of New Testament manuscripts by Scholz. It was examined by Bianchini.

The manuscript is not cited in the critical editions of the Greek New Testament (UBS3).

Currently the codex is located in the Vatican Library (Vat. gr. 1988) in Rome.

== See also ==
- List of New Testament lectionaries
- Biblical manuscript
- Textual criticism

== Bibliography ==
- Bianchini, Evangeliarium quadruplex latinae versionis antiquae seu veteris italicae (Rome, 1749), part 1, vol. 2, p. 518.
