= Lectionary 123 =

Lectionary ℓ 123
- New Testament manuscript
- Text: Evangelistarion
- Date: 10th century
- Script: Greek
- Now at: Vatican Library
- Size: 28.4 cm by 22.4 cm

Lectionary 123, designated by siglum ℓ 123 (in the Gregory-Aland numbering) is a Greek manuscript of the New Testament, on parchment leaves. Palaeographically it has been assigned to the 10th century.

== Description ==
The codex contains lessons from the Gospels of John, Matthew, Luke lectionary (Evangelistarium) with some lacunae, on 197 parchment leaves (28.4 cm by 22.4 cm). It is written in Greek uncial letters, in two columns per page, 11 lines per page, in large letters. It contains pictures. It is very correctly written, without points.

== History ==
The manuscript was added to the list of New Testament manuscripts by Scholz. It was examined by Alter and Bianchini.

The manuscript is not cited in the critical editions of the Greek New Testament (UBS3).

Currently the codex is located in the Vatican Library (Vat. gr. 1522) in Rome.

== See also ==
- List of New Testament lectionaries
- Biblical manuscript
- Textual criticism
