= Lectionary 127 =

Lectionary ℓ 127
- New Testament manuscript
- Text: Evangelistarion
- Date: 9th century
- Script: Greek
- Now at: Vatican Library
- Size: 27 cm by 18.5 cm

Lectionary 127, designated by siglum ℓ 127 (in the Gregory-Aland numbering) is a Greek manuscript of the New Testament, on parchment leaves. Palaeographically it has been assigned to the 9th century.

== Description ==
The codex contains lessons from the Gospels of John, Matthew, Luke lectionary (Evangelistarium) with some lacunae at the beginning and end. The codex contains 178 parchment leaves (27 cm by 18.5 cm). The text is written in Greek uncial letters, in two columns per page, 20-27 lines per page, in 9-13 letters per line. It contains the musical notes.

== History ==
The manuscript was added to the list of New Testament manuscripts by Scholz. It was examined and described by Montfaucon, Bianchini, Scholz, and Gregory.

The manuscript is not cited in the critical editions of the Greek New Testament (UBS3).

Currently the codex is located in the Vatican Library (Vat. gr. 2063) in Rome.

== See also ==
- List of New Testament lectionaries
- Biblical manuscript
- Textual criticism

== Bibliography ==
- B. de Montfaucon, Palaeographia Graeca (1708), p. 233 f.
- Bianchini, Evangeliarium quadruplex latinae versionis antiquae seu veteris italicae (Rome, 1749), part 1, vol. 2, p. 517.
- J. M. A. Scholz, Biblisch-kritische Reise in Frankreich, der Schweiz, Italien, Palästine und im Archipel in den Jahren 1818, 1819, 1820, 1821: Nebst einer Geschichte des Textes des Neuen Testaments, p. 102 f.
