= Kim Haines-Eitzen =

Kim Haines-Eitzen is the Hendrix Memorial Professor in the Department of Near Eastern Studies at Cornell University. She specialises in early Christianity, early Judaism, and other ancient Mediterranean Religions.

== Education ==
Haines-Eitzen received her PhD from the Department of Religious Studies at the University of North Carolina, Chapel Hill in 1997. Her doctoral thesis was entitled Literacy, Power, and the Transmitters of Early Christian Literature. She received an MA from the University of North Carolina in 1993.

== Career and research ==
Haines-Eitzen has published on early Christian scribal practices and on desert monasticism. She published the monograph Guardians of Letters: Literacy, Power, and the Transmitters of Early Christian Literature in 2000 with Oxford University Press. Her second book, The Gendered Palimpsest: Women, Writing, and Representation in Early Christianity, was also published by Oxford University Press in 2011. Sonorous Desert: What Deep Listening Taught Early Christian Monks and What It Can Teach Us was published in 2022 by the University of Princeton Press.

Haines-Eitzen featured in the documentary series The Story of God with Morgan Freeman, made by National Geographic. She was awarded a National Humanities Center (NHC) Fellowship for 2024-25. She has written for The Conversation.

== Bibliography ==
- The Gospel of John: A Biography. Princeton: Princeton University Press, 2026.
- Sonorous Desert: What Deep Listening Taught Early Christian Monks and What It Can Teach Us. Princeton: Princeton University Press, 2022.
- The Gendered Palimpsest: Women, Writing, and Representation in Early Christianity. Oxford: Oxford University Press, 2011.
- Boundaries and Bodies in Late Antiquity, co-edited with Georgia Frank, special issue of The Journal of Early Christian Studies 17 (2009)
- Guardians of Letters: Literacy, Power, and the Transmitters of Early Christian Literature. Oxford: Oxford University Press, 2000.
