= Papyrus 65 =

Papyrus 𝔓^{65}
- New Testament manuscript
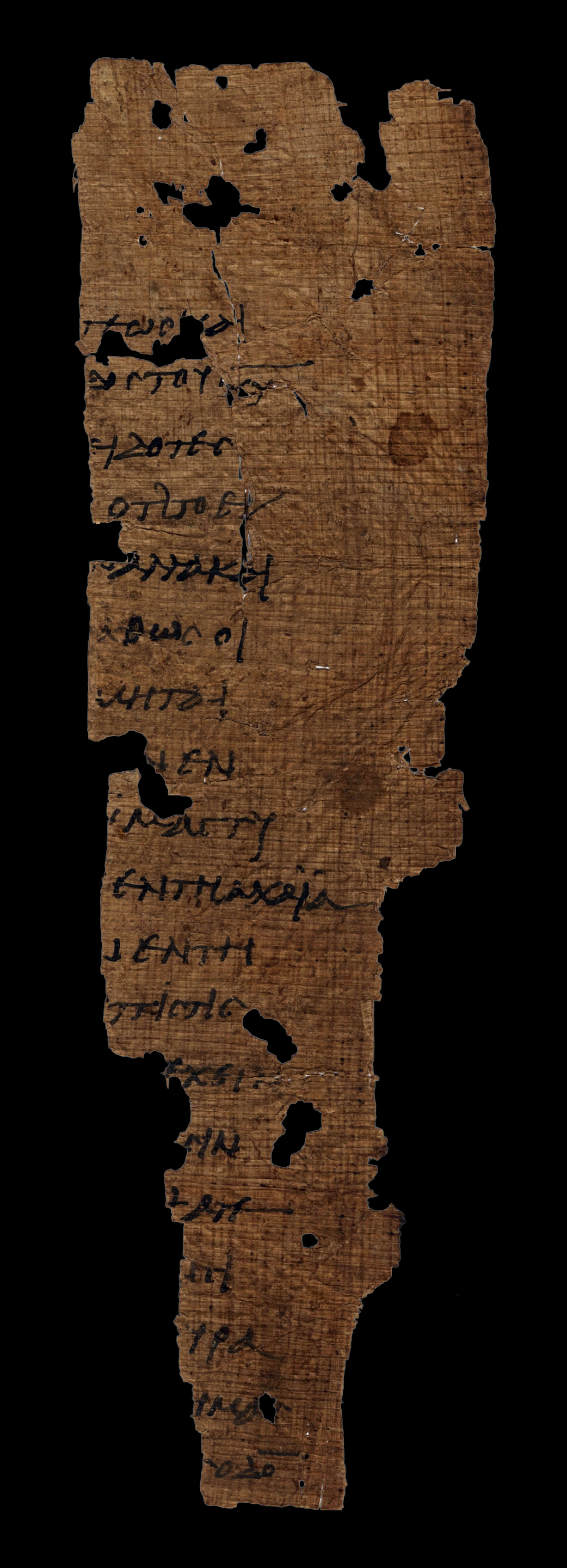
- Recto, 1 Thess 1:1-2:1
- Text: 1 Thessalonians 1-2 †
- Date: 3rd century
- Script: Greek
- Found: Egypt
- Now at: National Archaeological Museum (Florence)
- Cite: V. Bartoletti, PGLSI XIV, (1957), pp. 5-7.
- Type: Alexandrian text-type
- Category: I

Papyrus 65 (in the Gregory-Aland numbering), designated by 𝔓^{65}, is a copy of the New Testament in Greek. It is a papyrus manuscript of the First Epistle to the Thessalonians. The surviving texts of the epistle are the verses 1:3-2:1 and 2:6-13. The manuscript has been assigned on palaeographic grounds to the 3rd century.

Text

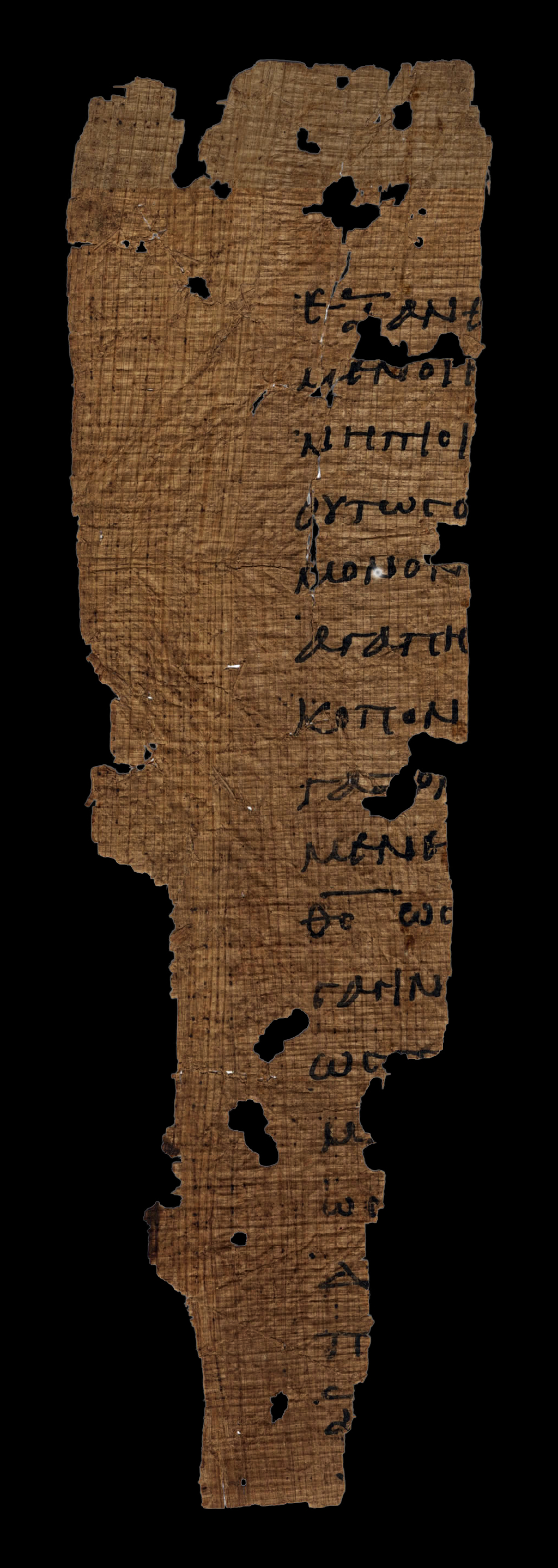
Verso, 1 Thess 2:6-13

The Greek text of this codex is a representative of the Alexandrian text-type. Aland placed it in Category I, but text of the manuscript is too brief for certainty. According to Philip Comfort, 𝔓^{49} and 𝔓^{65} came from the same manuscript.

Location

It is currently housed at the Papyrological Institute of Florence in National Archaeological Museum (Florence) (PSI 1373).

== See also ==
- List of New Testament papyri

== Images ==
- Papyrus 65
