= Minuscule 177 =

- New Testament manuscript
- Text: Acts, Paul, General epistles, Rev.
- Date: 11th century
- Script: Greek
- Now at: Bavarian State Library
- Size: 26.5 cm by 21 cm
- Type: Byzantine text-type
- Category: V
- Note: close to family K^{x} marginalia

Minuscule 177 (in the Gregory-Aland numbering), α 106 (Soden), is a Greek minuscule manuscript of the New Testament, on parchment. Palaeographically it has been assigned to the 11th century. Formerly it was labelled by 179^{a}, 128^{p}, and 82^{r}. It has marginalia.

== Description ==
The codex contains the text of the Acts of the Apostles, Pauline epistles, the General epistles and Book of Revelation on 225 parchment leaves (size 26.5 cm by 21 cm). The text is written in one column per page, in 25 lines per page.

The text is divided according to the κεφαλαια (chapters), whose numbers are given at the margin, and their τιτλοι (titles of chapters) at the top of the pages.

It contains prolegomena, fragments of the Eusebian Canon tables, numbers of στιχοι at the end of each book, and marginal notes to the Pauline epistles. It has also a treatise of Pseudo-Dorotheus on the Seventy disciples and twelve apostles (as codices 82, 93, 459, 613, 617, 699).

== Text ==
The Greek text of the codex is a representative of the Byzantine text-type. Aland placed it in Category V.

The text is very close to the Textus Receptus. It contains the Comma Johanneum (in 1 John 5:7) at the margin added in the 17th or 18th century.

== History ==
The manuscript once belonged to Zomozerab, the Bohemian. The portion of the manuscript which contains the text of the Apocalypse was collated by Franz Delitzsch. C. R. Gregory saw the manuscript in 1887.

It was added to the list of New Testament manuscripts by Scholz. Formerly it was labelled by 179^{a}, 128^{p}, and 82^{r}. In 1908 Gregory gave the number 177 to it.

It is currently housed at the Bavarian State Library (Gr. 211), at Munich.

== See also ==
- List of New Testament minuscules
- Biblical manuscript
- Textual criticism
