= Giuseppe Bianchini =

Italian Oratorian and scholar

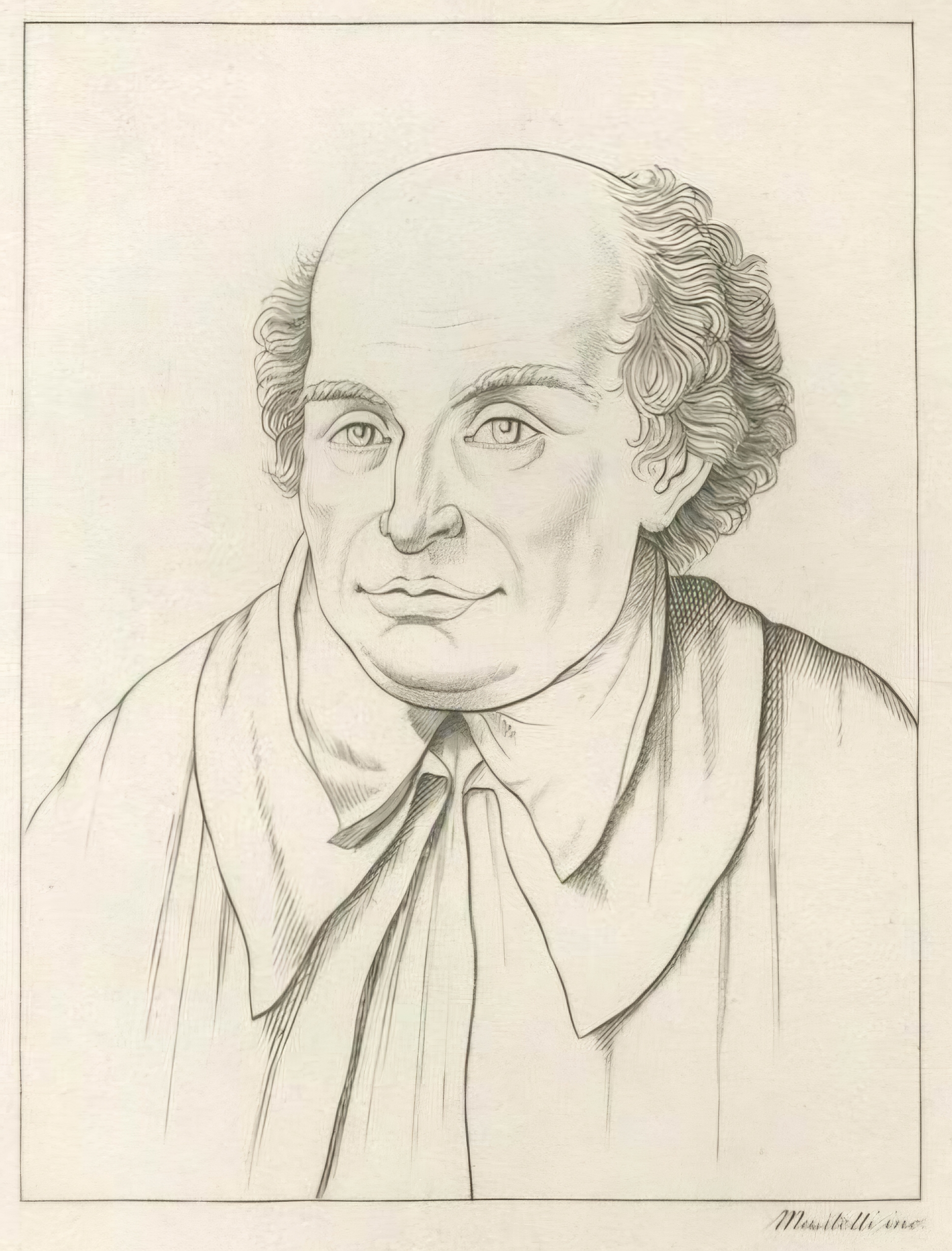
Giuseppe Bianchini

Giuseppe Bianchini (1704 in Verona – 1764 in Rome) was an Italian Oratorian, biblical, historical, and liturgical scholar.

== Works ==
Clement XII and Benedict XIV, who highly appreciated Bianchini's learning, entrusted him with several scientific labors. Bianchini had contemplated a large work on the texts of the Bible, Vindiciæ Canonicarum Scripturarum Vulgatæ latinæ editionis, which was to comprise several volumes, but only the first, in which, among other things, are to be found fragments of the Hexapla (Codex Chisianus), was published (Rome, 1740). Much more important is his Evangeliarium quadruplex latinæ versionis antiquæ, etc., 2 vols. (Rome, 1749). Among his historical works may be mentioned the fourth volume which Bianchini added to the publication of his uncle, Francesco Bianchini, Anastasii bibliothecarii Vitæ Rom. Pontif. (Rome, 1735); he also published the Demonstratio historiæ ecclesiasticæ quadripartitæ (Rome, 1752–54). The chief liturgical work of Bianchini is Liturgia antiqua hispanica, gothica, isidoriana, mozarabica, toletana mixta (Rome, 1746). He also undertook the edition of the works of B. Thomasius (Tomasi), but only one volume was issued (Rome, 1741).

In addition he investigated and wrote an account of the reported spontaneous human combustion of the Countess Cornelia Zangheri Bandi (Verona, 1731, later republished at Rome).

Bianchini examined and described many of biblical manuscripts housed in Italy, such as: Minuscule 145, 169, 170, 171, 173, 174, 175, 176, 178, 179, 180, 196, 394, 397, 450, 627, 632, Lectionary 35, Lectionary 46, Lectionary 123, Lectionary 124, Lectionary 125, Lectionary 126, Lectionary 127, Codex Cyprius, Codex Angelicus, Codex Campianus, Codex Vaticanus 2066, Codex Curiensis, Codex Corbeiensis I, Codex Corbeiensis II, Codex Sangermanensis I.

== Writings ==
- Evangeliarium quadruplex latinæ versionis antiquæ seu veteris italicæ (Rome, 1749)
