= Charles Delagrave (publisher) =

French publisher and editor

Charles Marie Eugène Delagrave (12 May 1842 – 17 March 1934) was a French publisher and editor, specializing in primary, secondary and university educational works. He was born and died in Paris.

== Life ==
After studying at the collège Sainte-Barbe, in 1865 Delagrave acquired a classic bookshop founded by Dezobry and Magdeleine 25 years before and by 1865 run by Tandou. Delagrave expanded it considerably and was recognized and rewarded at international exhibitions in Paris, Philadelphia, Antwerp, Melbourne and Barcelona.

He edited important cartographic publications by Levasseur, as well as being a member of the Institut de France and publishing works on art education, new years' honours and prizes. On his death his funeral was held at the Église Saint-Thomas-d'Aquin.

== Sources ==
- Francis Marcoin, Librairie de jeunesse et littérature industrielle au XIXe siècle, vol. 7 de Histoire culturelle de l'Europe, Paris, Honoré Champion, 2006, 893 p. (ISBN 978-2-74531-301-0, ISSN 1296-5677), p. 609.
- Louis Bethléem, Revue des lectures, Lille, 1934, p. 651.
- Françoise-Thérèse Charpentier, Georges Barbier-Ludwig et Bernard Ponton, Lettres pour l'art : correspondence, 1882-1904, Strasbourg, La Nuée bleue, 2006, 349 p. (ISBN 978-2-71650-690-8), p. 329.
