= Herman Hoskier =

British banker

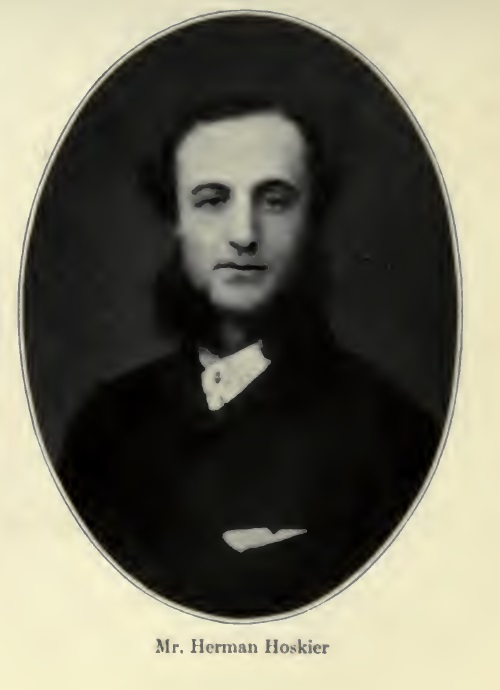
Herman Hoskier

Herman Hoskier (1832–1904), British banker, lived at Hayes, Kent, England. He was a director of the Union Bank of London and of Brown, Shipley & Co. He had a daughter Coralie Mary Hoskier and son Herman Charles Hoskier.

During the American Civil War he was the agent for Brown Bros. & Co. in New Orleans and Mobile, Alabama, and subsequently he became partner of Brown, Shipley & Co., founding its London house when its Liverpool branch closed. He retired from the firm in 1881, and became a director of the Guinness Brewery.
