= Minuscule 699 =

- New Testament manuscript
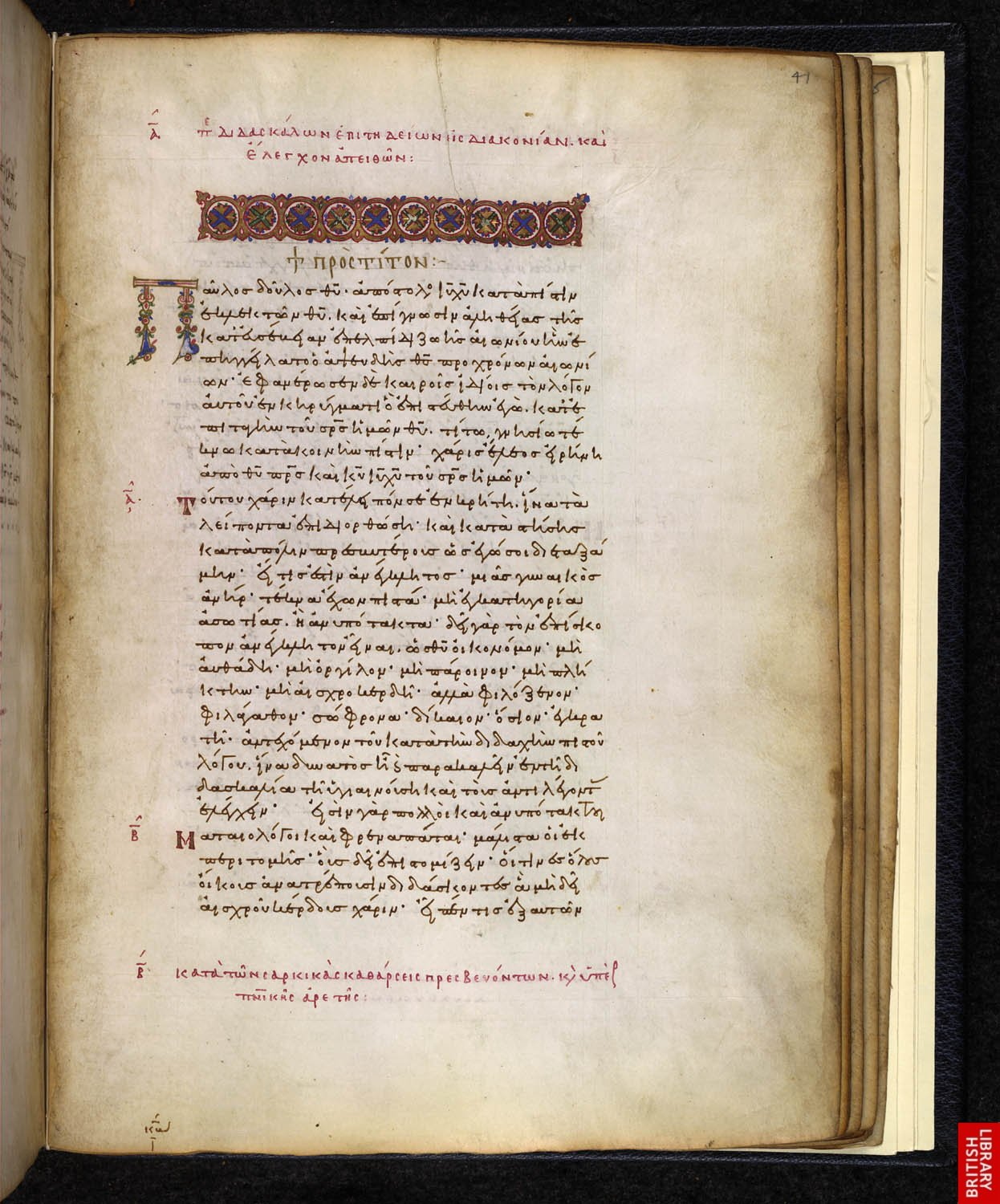
- Folio 41 verso of Egerton MS 3145, the beginning of the Epistle to Titus
- Text: New Testament †
- Date: mid 10th or 11th century
- Script: Greek
- Now at: British Library
- Size: 29.3 cm by 20.6 cm
- Type: Byzantine text-type
- Category: V

Minuscule 699 (in the Gregory-Aland numbering), δ104 (von Soden), is a Greek minuscule manuscript of the New Testament, on parchment. Palaeographically it has been assigned to the 11th century. Some leaves of the manuscript were lost. Scrivener labelled it by 603^{e}.

== Description ==
The codex contains the text of the New Testament on 369 parchment leaves (size 29.3 cm by 20.6 cm), with some lacunae (Romans 16:19–27; 1 Cor 1:1–11; 2 Cor 10:9–13:13; Gal 1:1–12). Four leaves are unfoliated on paper. The order of books is usual for the Greek manuscripts: Gospels, Acts, Catholic epistles, Pauline epistles (Hebrews before 1 Timothy), Apocalypse.

The text is written in one column per page, 30 lines per page. The text of Matthew 23:1–20 was supplied by a later hand. The headpieces in colour and gold, the large initials in colours and gold, at the beginning of books, small initials in red and gold.

The text is divided according to the κεφαλαια (chapters), whose numbers are given at the left margin; the τιτλοι (titles) are given at the top or bottom of the pages. There is also a division according to the Ammonian Sections (in Mark 241, the last section in 16:20), but there are no references to the Eusebian Canons.

It contains the tables of the κεφαλαια before each Gospel, lectionary markings in the margin, and subscriptions at the end, Synaxarion, and Menologion. It contains many brief scholia on the margin made by prima manu. At the end on three leaves are unfinished επιγραμμα of Pseudo-Dorotheus, Bishop of Tyre, on the Seventy disciples and the 12 Apostles.

In the Pauline epistles occur iota adscriptum, and N ephelkystikon always with verbs (except Hebrews 1:14; 12:8.11) is frequent; errors of itacismus occur 49 times: αι (for ε) 5; ε (for αι) 2; ι (for ει) 5; ει (for ι) 8; ει (for η) 5; η (for ει) 3; ω (for ο) 6; ο (for ω) 9; ι (for η) 2; η (for ι) 3; ε (for η) 1; υ (for οι) 1.

There are omissions by homoioteleuton in Philemon 2:20; 2 Thessalonians 3:4; 1 Timothy 1:9; 2 Timothy 4:11.

== Text ==
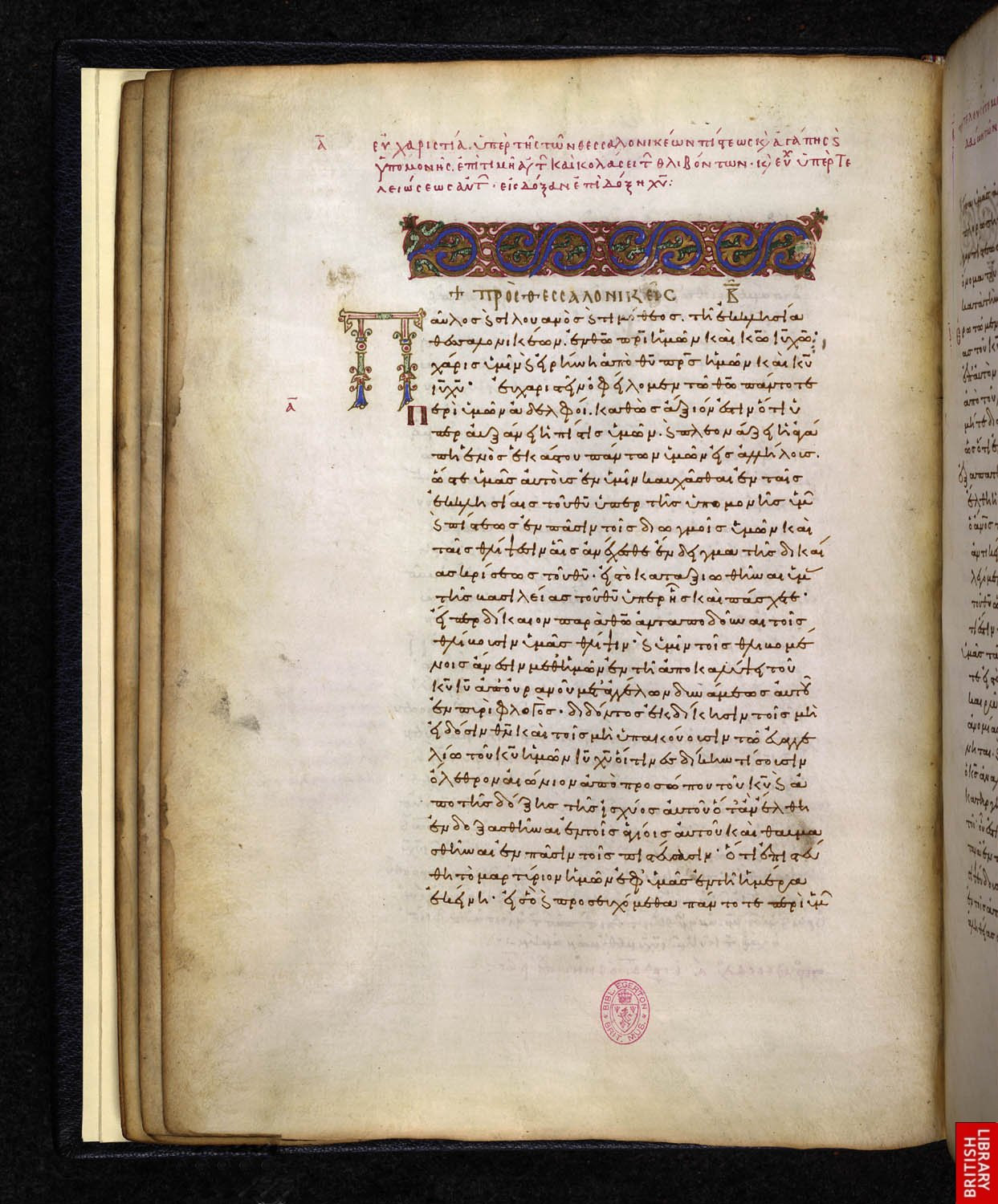
Folio 18 recto of the codex, the beginning of the 1 Thessalonians, with the decorated headpiece

The Greek text of the codex is a representative of the Byzantine text-type. Hermann von Soden classified it as part of the textual family Family K^{1}. According to Soden this group represents the oldest form of the Byzantine text, descends from the 4th century and was a result of Lucian's recension.

Kurt Aland the Greek text of the codex placed it in Category V.

According to the Claremont Profile Method it represents textual group K^{x} in Luke 1 and Luke 20. In Luke 10 no profile was made. It creates a textual cluster with Codex Athous Dionysiou.

It lacks the text of Matthew 16:2b–3 (signs of the times).

It has some remarkable readings but they are very rare.

== History ==
Scrivener dated the manuscript to the 10th or 11th century, Gregory dated the manuscript to the 11th century. Currently the manuscript is dated by the British Library to the mid 10th century and by the INTF to the 11th century.. Probably it was written in Constantinople.

In 1864, the manuscript was in the possession of a dealer at Janina in Epeiros. It was then purchased from him by a representative of Baroness Burdett-Coutts (1814–1906), a philanthropist, along with other Greek manuscripts of the New Testament. They were transported to England in 1871. Part of the manuscript (Egerton MS 3145) was purchased by the British Museum, on 8 October 1938.

The manuscript was presented by Burdett-Coutts to Sir Roger Cholmely's School, and was housed at the Highgate (Burdett-Coutts II. 4), in London. Scrivener examined and collated its text. His collation was edited posthumously in 1893.

It was added to the list of New Testament manuscripts by Scrivener (603) and Gregory (699).

It was examined and described by S. T. Bloomfield, Dean Burgon, Edward A. Guy. Gregory saw the manuscript in 1883. Herman C. Hoskier collated text of the Apocalypse.

The manuscript is housed at the British Library, in two collections. 302 leaves (Matthew-Galatians, including the Catholics) are housed in the Additional Manuscripts (Add MS 28815) and 67 leaves (Ephesians-Revelation) are housed in the Egerton collection (Egerton MS 3145).

== See also ==
- Biblical manuscript
- Lists of New Testament minuscules
- Seventy disciples
- Textual criticism
