= Herman C. Hoskier =

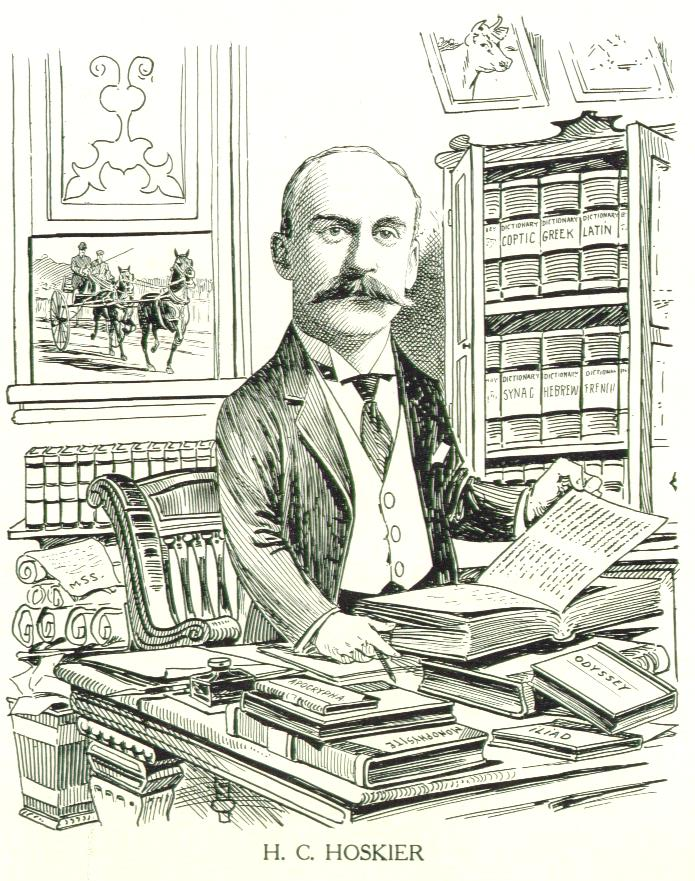

Herman Charles Hoskier (1864–1938), was a biblical scholar, British textual critic, and son of a merchant banker, Herman Hoskier (1832–1904).

As a textual critic of the New Testament, Hoskier generally but not entirely supported the text-type known as the Byzantine text-type against the Alexandrian text-type: the "text-types" are groups of different New Testament manuscripts which share specific or generally related readings, which then differ from each other group, and thus the conflicting readings can separate out the groups. These are then used to determine the original text as published; there are three main groups with names: Alexandrian, Western, and Byzantine. In one of his most famous publications, Codex B and It Allies, he compared the text of the two leading witnesses to the "Alexandrian Text Type", Codex Vaticanus and Codex Sinaiticus. With this publication he showed how many significant disagreements these supposedly "best witnesses" of the Alexandrian text have. Hoskier attempted to demonstrate that Vaticanus presents a text which has been conformed to the Coptic versions. He also compared the text of Minuscule 700 with the Textus Receptus, where he noted 2724 differences between the two.

Hoskier collated every known Greek manuscript of the Apocalypse up to the year 1918, which took him 30 years to complete. The result of this work was published in 1929 (Concerning the Text of the Apocalypse). Hoskier shows parallels between Papyrus 46 and the Ethiopic Version in the Pauline epistles.

== Works ==
- Hoskier, Herman Charles (1890). A Full Account and Collation of the Greek Cursive Codex Evangelium 604 (with two facsimiles). London: David Nutt Publishers.
- Hoskier, Herman Charles (1910). Concerning the Genesis of the Versions of the New Testament. Vol. 1–2. London: Bernard Quaritch.
- Hoskier, Herman Charles (1910). The Golden Latin Gospels in the library of J. Pierpont Morgan. New York: Private Printing.
- Hoskier, Herman Charles (1911). Concerning the date of the Bohairic Version. London: Bernard Quaritch.
- Hoskier, Herman Charles (1913). "Collation of Codex 157 (ROME. VAT. URB. 2)". Journal of Theological Studies. 14 (53). Oxford: Oxford University Press. JSTOR 23947304.
- Hoskier, Herman Charles (1913). The Lost Commentary of Oecumenius on the Apocalypse.
- Hoskier, Herman Charles (1914). Codex B and Its Allies, a Study and an Indictment. London: Bernard Quaritch.
- Hoskier, Herman Charles (1919). The Text of Codex Usserianus 2., or2 (microform) ("Garland of Howth") with critical notes to supplement and correct the collation of the late T. K. Abbott. London: Bernard Quaritch.
- Hoskier, Herman Charles (1925). Immortality. Boston: Stratford Company.
- Hoskier, Herman Charles (1928). The Complete Commentary of Oecumenius on the Apocalypse. Ann Abbor: University of Michigan.
- Hoskier, Herman Charles (1929). Concerning the Text of the Apocalypse: Collation of All Existing Available Greek Documents with the Standard Text of Stephen's Third Edition Together with the Testimony of Versions, Commentaries and Fathers. Vol. 1–2. London: Bernard Quaritch.
- Hoskier, Herman Charles (1930). The Bronze Horses. Portland: The Mosher press.
- Hoskier, Herman Charles (1930). What is Nirvana?. Portland: The Mosher press.
- Hoskier, Herman Charles (1932). In Tune with the Universe. London: Rider & Co.
- Hoskier, Herman Charles (1934). The Back of Beyond. London: C. W. Daniel Company.
- Hoskier, Herman Charles (1938). A Commentary on the Various Readings in the Text of the Epistle to the Hebrews in the Chester-Beatty Papyrus P46 (circa 200 A.D.). London: Bernard Quaritch.

== See also ==
- Differences between codices Sinaiticus and Vaticanus
