= Dorotheus of Tyre =

Syrian bishop of Tyre and saint (c. 255 – 362)

Saint Dorotheus
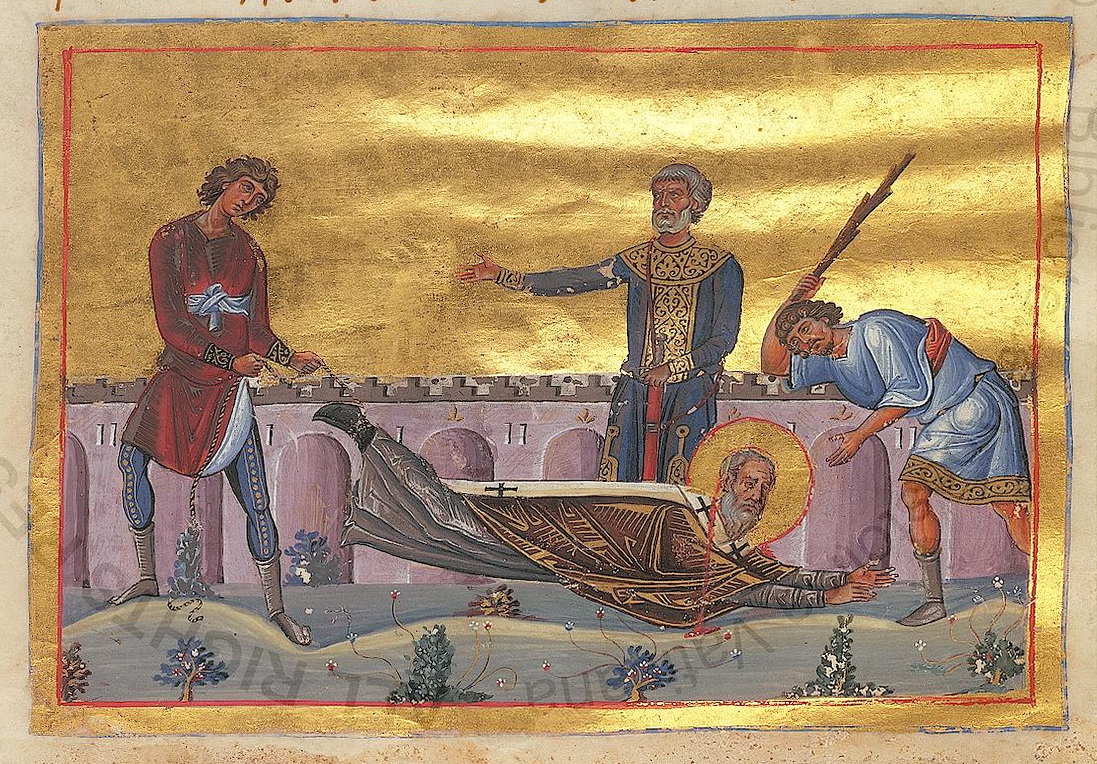
- Miniature from the Menologion of Basil II
- Born: c. 255; Antioch (modern-day Antakya, Hatay, Turkey)
- Died: 362
- Venerated in: Catholic Church; Eastern Orthodox Church
- Feast: June 5 (Gregorian calendar), June 18 (Julian calendar)
- Attributes: traditionally credited with an Acts of the Seventy Apostles

Saint Dorotheus (Greek: Άγιος Δωρόθεος) bishop of Tyre (present-day Lebanon; c. 255 – 362) is traditionally credited with an Acts of the Seventy Apostles (which may be the same work as the lost Gospel of the Seventy), who were sent out according to the Gospel of Luke 10:1.

Dorotheus was a learned priest of Antioch (Eusebius, VII.32) and a eunuch. Dorotheus is said to have been driven into exile during the persecution of Diocletian, but later returned. He attended the Council of Nicaea in 325, but was exiled to Odyssopolis (Varna) on the Black Sea in Thrace by Julian the Apostate. There, the 107-year-old priest was martyred for his faith. His feast day is observed June 5 according to the Gregorian calendar which coincides with June 18 on the Julian calendar.

== See also ==
- Pseudo-Dorotheus, works pseudepigraphically attributed to Dorotheus of Tyre
- 4th century in Lebanon
