= Pauline epistles =

Books of the New Testament attributed to Paul the Apostle

The Pauline epistles, also known as Epistles of Paul or Letters of Paul, are the thirteen books of the New Testament attributed to Paul the Apostle, although the authorship of some is in dispute. Among these epistles are some of the earliest extant Christian documents. They provide an insight into the beliefs and controversies of early Christianity. As part of the canon of the New Testament, they are foundational texts for both Christian theology and ethics.

The majority of scholars believe that Paul actually wrote seven of the thirteen Pauline epistles (Galatians, Romans, 1 Corinthians, 2 Corinthians, Philemon, Philippians, 1 Thessalonians) while three of the epistles in Paul's name are widely seen as pseudepigraphic (1 Timothy, 2 Timothy, and Titus). Whether Paul wrote the three other epistles in his name (2 Thessalonians, Ephesians and Colossians) is widely debated, with 2 Thessalonians having strong support for its authenticity. These latter six epistles are believed by some scholars to have come from followers writing in his name, using material from Paul's surviving letters and letters written by him that no longer survive. Though for Colossians, it has been noted that Colossians has indisputably Pauline stylistic characteristics, found nowhere else in the New Testament. Advocates of Pauline authorship also argue that the differences between Colossians and the rest of the New Testament are not as great as they are purported to be. The Epistle to the Hebrews, although it does not bear his name, was traditionally considered Pauline (although Rome questioned its authorship), but from the 16th century onwards opinion steadily moved against Pauline authorship and few scholars now ascribe it to Paul, mostly because it does not read like any of his other epistles in style and content and because the epistle does not indicate that Paul is the author, unlike the others.

The Pauline epistles are usually placed between the Acts of the Apostles and the catholic epistles (also called the general epistles) in modern editions. Most Greek manuscripts place the general epistles first, and a few minuscules (175, 325, 336, and 1424) place the Pauline epistles at the end of the New Testament.

== Authenticity ==
Possible dates of Pauline epistles ■ Captivity letters ■ Pastoral letters
36	(31–36 AD: conversion of Paul)
37
38
39
40
41
42
43
44
45
46
47
48	Epistle to the Galatians
49
50	First Epistle to the Thessalonians
51	Second Epistle to the Thessalonians
52
53
54	First Epistle to the Corinthians
55	Second Epistle to the Corinthians
56
57	Epistle to the Romans
58
59
60
61
62	Epistle to the Philippians
62	Epistle to Philemon
62	Epistle to the Colossians
62	Epistle to the Ephesians
63
64	First Epistle to Timothy
65	Second Epistle to Timothy
66	Epistle to Titus
67	(64–67 AD: death of Paul)

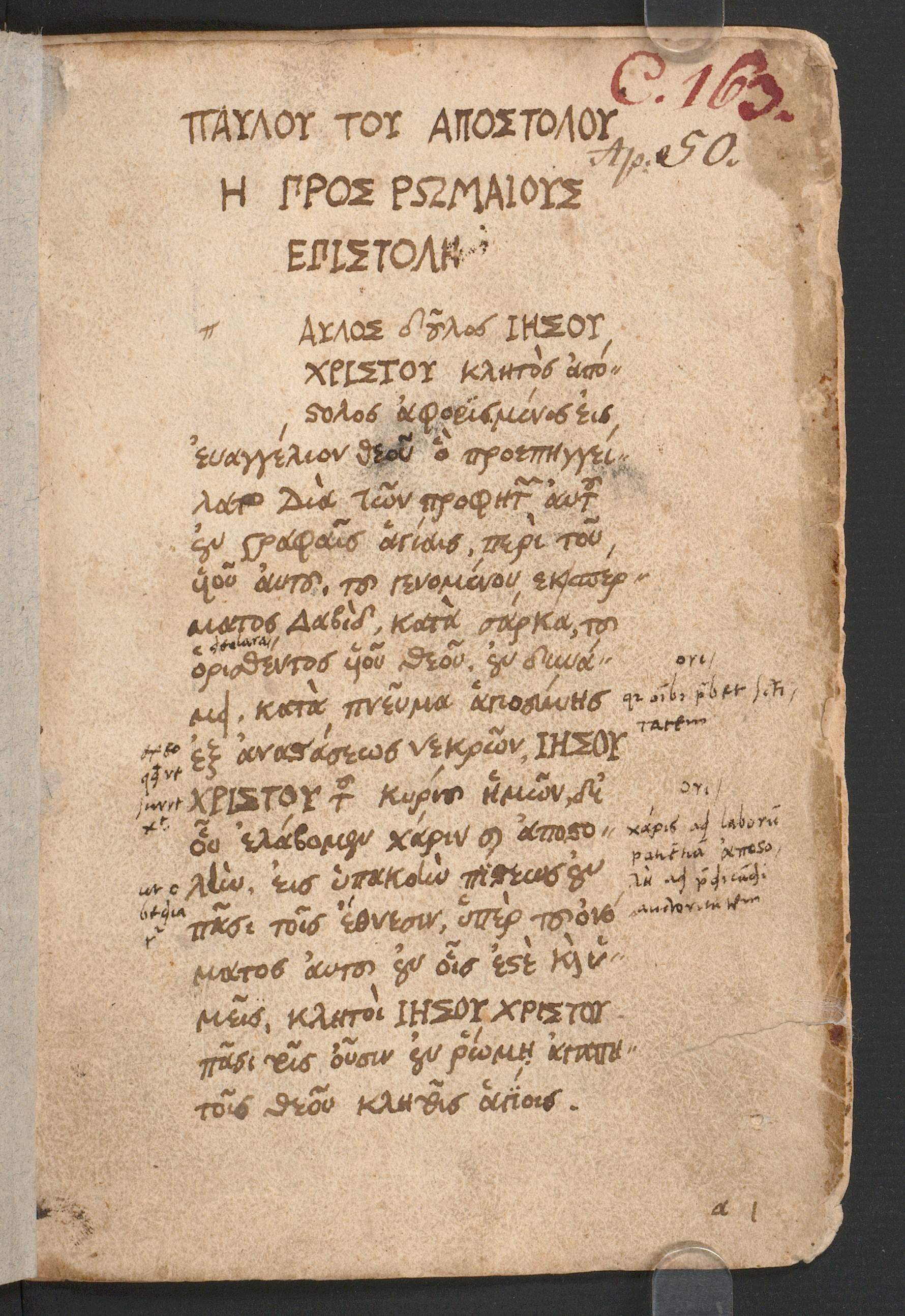
Beginning of the Greek manuscript by Huldrych Zwingli of the Pauline epistles, written in 1517, preserved in the Zentralbibliothek Zürich

In all of these epistles, except the Epistle to the Hebrews, the author and writer claims to be Paul. The contested letters may have been written using Paul's name, as it was common to attribute at that point in history.

On the letters where scholars are divided or think are pseudepigraphic, their arguments often rely on internal evidences (e.g. style, vocabulary, subject matter) which tend to be subjective, rather than external and historical evidences (e.g. extant manuscripts, reception of ancient authors, early canonical lists, letter titles, early translation collections of the New Testament). Early Christians consistently rejected forged writings and pseudepigraphers were unlikely to succeed since such writings did not circulate extensively compared to the writings contained in the New Testament, which have external evidence of being recognized as Pauline directly or indirectly.

Locations where Paul's letters were sent

Seven letters (with consensus dates) considered genuine by most scholars:

- Galatians (c. 48 AD)
- First Thessalonians (c. 49–51)
- First Corinthians (c. 53–54)
- Second Corinthians (c. 55–56)
- Romans (c. 55–57)
- Philippians (c. 57–59 or c. 62)
- Philemon (c. 57–59 or c. 62)

The three letters on which scholars are about evenly divided: If these letters are inauthentic, then the consensus dates are probably incorrect.

- Second Thessalonians (c. 51–52)
- Colossians (c. 57–59 or c. 62)
- Ephesians (c. 62)

The letters thought to be pseudepigraphic by many scholars (traditional dating given): The content of these letters strongly suggests they were written a decade or more later than the traditional dates.

- First Timothy (c. 62–64)
- Second Timothy (c. 62–65)
- Titus (c. 66–67)
- Epistle to the Hebrews, although anonymous and not really in the form of a letter, has long been included among Paul's collected letters. Although some churches ascribe Hebrews to Paul, neither most of Christianity nor modern scholarship does so.

== Ancient letter collecting and publishing practices ==
=== Paul's use of secretaries ===
A number of scholars have argued that from biographic details from Paul, he likely suffered from some physical impediment such as vision loss or damaged hands. Paul explicitly states in multiple epistles that he used secretaries, sometimes mentioned by name, a potential explanation for seemingly non-Pauline epistles. The six disputed epistles are believed by some scholars to have come from followers writing in his name, using material from Paul's surviving letters and letters written by him that no longer survive. Paul used scribal secretaries and may have had a team of readers, which adds layers to how Paul's letters were composed. Candida Moss has argued that enslaved and formerly enslaved secretaries played a significant but overlooked role in the production of early Christian texts such as the Pauline epistles, urging a broader and more ethical recognition of their contributions to authorship beyond traditional assumptions. Paul's secretaries and close associates often delivered and routed his letters to churches and other destinations, as he mentions in some of his letters, and they helped distribute news from other churches as well.

=== Letter structure and publishing norms ===
Paul was not different than other ancient authors that wrote, collected, and published letters, which was a specific literary genre. Cicero, Seneca, Pliny the Younger, Ignatius of Antioch offer comparable examples to Pauline letter publishing. Among the practices of ancient letter publishing, authors played a role in assembling and preparing their letters for circulation, letters were not typically arranged chronologically but by addressee or subject, letter collections were sometimes expanded over time even with pseudepigraphic writings after the author's death, and scribes or secretaries made duplicate copies for their clients.

The letters of Paul follow a Greco-Roman conventional structure, with some modification: opening, thanksgiving or blessing, body, and closing.

== Order ==
In the order they appear in the New Testament, the Pauline epistles are:

Name	Addressees	Greek	Latin	Abbreviations	
Name	Addressees	Greek	Latin	Full	Min.
Romans	Church at Rome	Πρὸς Ῥωμαίους	Epistola ad Romanos	Rom	Ro
1 Corinthians	Church at Corinth	Πρὸς Κορινθίους Αʹ	Epistola I ad Corinthios	1 Cor	1C
2 Corinthians	Church at Corinth	Πρὸς Κορινθίους Βʹ	Epistola II ad Corinthios	2 Cor	2C
Galatians	Churches in Galatia	Πρὸς Γαλάτας	Epistola ad Galatas	Gal	G
Ephesians	Church at Ephesus	Πρὸς Ἐφεσίους	Epistola ad Ephesios	Eph	E
Philippians	Church at Philippi	Πρὸς Φιλιππησίους	Epistola ad Philippenses	Phil	Phi
Colossians	Church at Colossae	Πρὸς Κολοσσαεῖς	Epistola ad Colossenses	Col	C
1 Thessalonians	Church at Thessalonica	Πρὸς Θεσσαλονικεῖς Αʹ	Epistola I ad Thessalonicenses	1 Thess	1Th
2 Thessalonians	Church at Thessalonica	Πρὸς Θεσσαλονικεῖς Βʹ	Epistola II ad Thessalonicenses	2 Thess	2Th
1 Timothy	Saint Timothy	Πρὸς Τιμόθεον Αʹ	Epistola I ad Timotheum	1 Tim	1T
2 Timothy	Saint Timothy	Πρὸς Τιμόθεον Βʹ	Epistola II ad Timotheum	2 Tim	2T
Titus	Saint Titus	Πρὸς Τίτον	Epistola ad Titum	Tit	T
Philemon	Saint Philemon	Πρὸς Φιλήμονα	Epistola ad Philemonem	Philem	P
Hebrews*	Hebrew Christians	Πρὸς Ἑβραίους	Epistola ad Hebraeos	Heb	H

This ordering is remarkably consistent in the manuscript tradition, with very few deviations. The evident principle of organization is descending length of the Greek text, but keeping the three pastoral epistles addressed to individuals in a separate final section. The only anomaly is that Galatians precedes the slightly longer Ephesians.

Chronological order of Paul's letters
Date	Name	Location of authorship
c. 48	Galatians	Antioch (uncertain)
c. 49–51	1 Thessalonians	Corinth
c. 49–51	2 Thessalonians	Corinth
c. 53–55	1 Corinthians	Ephesus
c. 55–56	2 Corinthians	Macedonia
c. 57	Romans	Corinth
c. 62	Ephesians	Rome
c. 62	Philippians	Rome
c. 62	Colossians	Rome
c. 62	Philemon	Rome
c. 62–64	1 Timothy	Macedonia
c. 62–64	Titus	Nicopolis
c. 64–67	2 Timothy	Rome

In modern editions, the anonymous Epistle to the Hebrews is placed at the end of Paul's letters and before the general epistles. This practice was popularized through the 4th century Vulgate by Jerome, who was aware of ancient doubts about its authorship, and is also followed in most medieval Byzantine manuscripts with hardly any exceptions.

The placement of Hebrews among the Pauline epistles is less consistent in the manuscripts:

- between Romans and 1 Corinthians (i.e., in order by length without splitting the Epistles to the Corinthians): Papyrus 46 and minuscules 103, 455, 1961, 1964, 1977, 1994.
- between 2 Corinthians and Galatians: minuscules 1930, 1978, and 2248
- between Galatians and Ephesians: implied by the numbering in B. In B, Galatians ends and Ephesians begins on the same side of the same folio (page 1493); similarly 2 Thessalonians ends and Hebrews begins on the same side of the same folio (page 1512).
- between 2 Thessalonians and 1 Timothy (i.e., before the Pastorals): א, A, B, C, H, I, P, 0150, 0151, and about 60 minuscules (e.g. 218, 632)
- after Philemon: D, 048, E, K, L and the majority of minuscules.
- omitted: F and G

== Lost Pauline epistles ==
Paul's own writings are sometimes thought to indicate several of his letters that have not been preserved:

- A first, or "zeroth", epistle to Corinth, also called A Prior Epistle of Paul to the Corinthians, or Paul's previous Corinthian letter, possibly referenced at 1 Corinthians 5:9.
- A third epistle to Corinth, written in between 1 and 2 Corinthians, also called the Severe Letter, referenced at 2 Corinthians 2:4 and 2 Corinthians 7:8–9
- An earlier epistle to the Ephesians referenced at Ephesians 3:3–4
- A possible Pauline Epistle to the Laodiceans, referenced at Colossians 4:16

== Pseudepigraphic epistles ==
Several other epistles were attributed to Paul during the course of history but are now considered pseudepigraphic. They are not considered canonical by most Christian denominations, but some do appear in some Bibles.

- Third Epistle to the Corinthians, a correspondence of two letters allegedly sent by the Corinthians to Paul, and then a reply letter allegedly sent by Paul to the Church of Corinth. It was considered genuine for some time by the Syriac Orthodox Church and the Armenian Apostolic Church, but is now widely dated in the second half of the 2nd century CE.
- Epistle to the Alexandrians, an alleged epistle written by Paul to the Church of Alexandria. It is mentioned in the Muratorian fragment (2nd century CE), which denounces it as a spurious work forged by Marcion of Sinope. Its text has been lost and nothing is known about its content.
- Non-Pauline Epistle to the Laodiceans versions:
  - The Marcionite Epistle to the Laodiceans. The Muratorian fragment (2nd century CE) denounces a claimed Epistle to the Laodiceans as another spurious work forged by Marcion of Sinope. Its text has been lost and nothing is known about its content.
  - The Latin Epistle to the Laodiceans. It is found in some old Latin Bible manuscripts, but is widely considered a forgery, and is largely a copy of verses from the Epistle to the Philippians. Theories vary, but it was possibly made as a counterforgery to offset the popularity of the Marcionite epistle.
- Correspondence of Paul and Seneca, a collection of correspondence claiming to be between Paul and Seneca the Younger. They are universally considered a forgery from the 4th century CE.

== Collected epistles ==
David Trobisch finds it likely that Paul first collected his letters for publication himself. It was normal practice in Paul's time for letter writers to keep one copy for themselves and send a second copy to the recipient(s); surviving collections of ancient letters sometimes originated from the senders' copies, at other times from the recipients' copies. A collection of Paul's letters circulated separately from other early Christian writings and later became part of the New Testament. When the canon was established, the gospels and Paul's letters were the core of what would become the New Testament.

== See also ==
- Biblical apocrypha
- New Testament athletic metaphors
- New Testament military metaphors

== Bibliographic resources ==
- Aland Kurt. "The Problem of Anonymity and Pseudonymity in Christian Literature of the First Two Centuries." Journal of Theological Studies 12 (1961): 39–49.
- Bahr, Gordon J. "Paul and Letter Writing in the First Century." Catholic Biblical Quarterly 28 (1966): 465–477. idem, "The Subscriptions in the Pauline Letters." Journal of Biblical Literature 2 (1968): 27–41.
- Bauckham, Richard J. "Pseudo-Apostolic Letters." Journal of Biblical Literature 107 (1988): 469–494.
- Carson, D.A. "Pseudonymity and Pseudepigraphy." Dictionary of New Testament Background. Eds. Craig A. Evans and Stanley E. Porter. Downers Grove: InterVarsity, 2000. 857–864.
- Cousar, Charles B. The Letters of Paul. Interpreting Biblical Texts. Nashville: Abingdon, 1996.
- Deissmann, G. Adolf. Bible Studies. Trans. Alexander Grieve. 1901. Peabody: Hendrickson, 1988.
- Doty, William G. Letters in Primitive Christianity. Guides to Biblical Scholarship. New Testament. Ed. Dan O. Via Jr. Philadelphia: Fortress, 1988.
- Gamble, Harry Y. "Amanuensis." Anchor Bible Dictionary. Vol. 1. Ed. David Noel Freedman. New York: Doubleday, 1992.
- Haines-Eitzen, Kim. "'Girls Trained in Beautiful Writing': Female Scribes in Roman Antiquity and Early Christianity." Journal of Early Christian Studies 6.4 (1998): 629–646.
- Hart, David Bentley. "The New Testament." New Haven and London: Yale University Press: 2017. 570–574.
- Kim, Yung Suk. A Theological Introduction to Paul's Letters. Eugene, Oregon: Cascade Books, 2011.
- Longenecker, Richard N. "Ancient Amanuenses and the Pauline Epistles." New Dimensions in New Testament Study. Eds. Richard N. Longenecker and Merrill C. Tenney. Grand Rapids: Zondervan, 1974. 281–297. idem, "On the Form, Function, and Authority of the New Testament Letters." Scripture and Truth. Eds. D.A. Carson and John D. Woodbridge. Grand Rapids: Zondervan, 1983. 101–114.
- Murphy-O'Connor, Jerome. Paul the Letter-Writer: His World, His Options, His Skills. Collegeville, MN: Liturgical, 1995.
- Richards, E. Randolph. The Secretary in the Letters of Paul. Tübingen: Mohr, 1991. idem, "The Codex and the Early Collection of Paul's Letters." Bulletin for Bulletin Research 8 (1998): 151–66. idem, Paul and First-Century Letter Writing: Secretaries, Composition, and Collection. Downers Grove: InterVarsity, 2004.
- Robson, E. Iliff. "Composition and Dictation in New Testament Books." Journal of Theological Studies 18 (1917): 288–301.
- Slaten, Arthur Wakefield (1918) "Qualitative nouns in the Pauline epistles and their translation in the revised version". Chicago, Illonis: The University of Chicago Press. OCLC 1051723498
- Stowers, Stanley K. Letter Writing in Greco-Roman Antiquity. Library of Early Christianity. Vol. 8. Ed. Wayne A. Meeks. Philadelphia: Westminster, 1989.
- Wall, Robert W. "Introduction to Epistolary Literature." New Interpreter's Bible. Vol. 10. Ed. Leander E. Keck. Nashville: Abingdon, 2002. 369–391.
