= Interpretations of the Book of Revelation =

The Book of Revelation belongs to the biblical texts whose interpretation has always posed many challenges, leading to the development of various interpretative systems. Ancient Eastern exegesis was prophetic in nature and favored allegorical interpretations. Since the 3rd century, many exegetes have believed that the Book of Revelation presents the same issues multiple times under different symbols.

By the end of the Middle Ages, a historical-philosophical interpretation emerged, relating the symbols of the Apocalypse to the history of the church. It was characterized by an anti-Muslim perspective. Initially, the Protestant exegesis also employed a historical-philosophical interpretation, but with an anti-Catholic and anti-papal stance. In the 17th century, an eschatological interpretation arose, relating most of the symbols in the Apocalypse to the end of the world.

By the late 19th century, a dispute over the literary unity of the Apocalypse and the origin of its symbols began. A polemic ensued, and extreme and overly far-reaching proposals were rejected. This debate has not yet been fully resolved and currently concerns only the initial and final parts of the Apocalypse.

== Patristic era ==
=== Greek exegesis ===
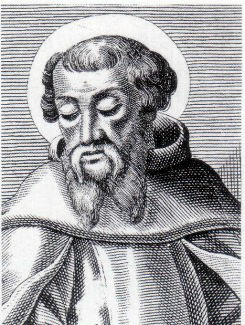
Irenaeus of Lyon

The exegesis of the Book of Revelation began in Anatolia by the Greeks as early as the beginning of the 2nd century (Papias of Hierapolis, bishop of Hierapolis), but it initially focused only on selected fragments of the Apocalypse. Papias proclaimed that after the resurrection of the righteous, Christ would visibly reign on Earth for a thousand years, after which there would be a universal resurrection and judgment. Justin Martyr was also a millenarian.

By the mid-2nd century, Melito of Sardis engaged with the Apocalypse, and around the year 170, he wrote a work titled On the Devil and the Apocalypse of John, which has been lost. Also lost is a commentary by Didymus the Blind.

At the end of the 2nd century, Irenaeus (d. 202) brought the accomplishments of the Anatolian exegesis to the West. In the fifth book of Adversus Haereses (around 180), he interprets certain fragments of the Apocalypse, primarily chapters 13 and 17, connecting them to chapters 2 and 7 of the Book of Daniel. He associates the symbols of the Apocalypse with pagan Rome, but applies an eschatological interpretation, viewing the millennium as a sabbatical millennium of peace on Earth. His interpretation is a derivative of Anatolian speculations.

Hippolytus of Rome (d. 236) authored a commentary on the Apocalypse, but it has survived only in fragments. However, another of his works, De Christo et Antichristo (around 200), which provides an almost complete interpretation of chapters 11–13, 17 (derived from Irenaeus), also addresses chapters 18, 21, and 22. His interpretation is similar to that of Irenaeus.

Origen (d. 254) did not write a commentary on the Apocalypse, but his hermeneutical principles left a strong mark on the exegesis of this book, especially in the East. He believed that biblical texts contained both somatic (literal) and allegorical meanings, with the latter being of greater value. The allegorical meaning could be either psychological, accessible to the less perfect, or pneumatic, available only to the perfect. Origen rejected millenarianism.

A significant role in the development of exegesis (particularly Eastern) of the Apocalypse was played by the work of the millenarian Methodius of Olympus (d. 311), Convivium Decem Virginum. In the eighth discourse, he interprets the symbols of chapter 12 of the Apocalypse. Methodius opposed Origen's views on apokatastasis, resurrection, and others, but used the allegorical method of interpretation derived from him. He believed that the three-and-a-half-year tribulation of the Apocalypse would begin in the year 350 AD after the death of the Lord. In his view, the number of the beast was 616, which represented the monogram of the Antichrist. He also associated the seven heads of the dragon with the seven deadly sins: lack of self-control, lust, cowardice, weakness, unbelief, foolishness, and everything that benefits evil.

Andreas of Caesarea (6th century) applied a triple sense of Scripture: literal, moral, and allegorical. In the Apocalypse, the allegorical sense predominated. His commentary played an important role in Eastern exegesis until the end of the Middle Ages. He was also the last Eastern exegete to influence Western exegesis. Andreas of Caesarea went to great lengths to reach ancient Greek manuscripts and compile all significant interpretations of the Apocalypse of John (Papias, Justin, Irenaeus, etc.). In his interpretation of chapter 12, he follows Methodius, while in chapters 13 and 17, he is influenced by Irenaeus and Hippolytus, and in the interpretation of chapter 20, by Ticonius and Augustine of Hippo. Furthermore, he engages in polemics with Oecumenius. He combines the allegorical method (influenced by Methodius) with the literal one, and recapitulation with a continuous, uninterrupted exposition of the Apocalypse of John. This results in the use of different, sometimes incompatible interpretations, which he did not entirely reconcile. However, the lack of synthetic continuity in Andreas' commentary is not as glaring as in other commentaries of his time, and his commentary is considered the best Greek commentary of the Middle Ages. It had a significant influence on later medieval commentators, as well as on those who came after (including Erasmus and Francisco Ribera). Today, this commentary plays a crucial role in textual criticism.

The commentary of Arethas of Caesarea (around 895) is a compilation that blends opposing views from Andreas and Oecumenius. Eastern exegesis had a prophetic and apocalyptic character, and its representatives favored allegorical interpretations.

The Syriac commentary by Dionysius bar Salibi (12th century) is dependent on early Greek exegetes such as Pope Dionysius of Alexandria, Hippolytus of Rome, and Hippolytus of Bosra.

=== Latin exegesis ===
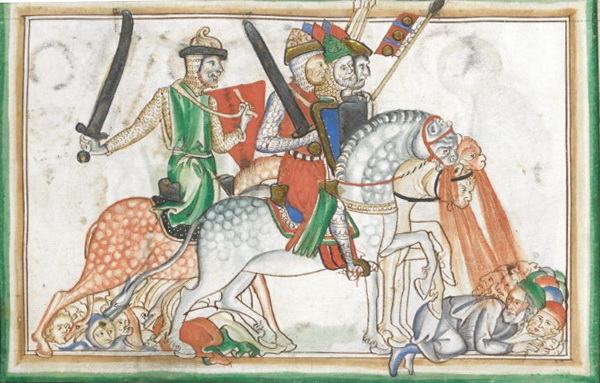
Four Horsemen of the Apocalypse in a 13th-century manuscript, kept in the British Library

The first Latin commentary – written by a Greek – was authored by Victorinus of Pettau (d. 304) in the late 3rd century. Though incomplete, it became the foundation for later Latin commentaries. Victorinus was the first to apply the principle of recapitulation, though he did not use the term itself. The Apocalypse presents the same issues multiple times under different symbols (Ticonius later called this recapitulation). He equates the seven "trumpets" with the seven "bowls", and the apocalyptic beast is Nero.

Later, the Donatist Ticonius (d. 390) made use of this text, and his commentary became a significant expansion of Victorinus' work. Ticonius' text has survived in four editions (including that of Jerome). Ticonius broke with millenarianism, and in his view, Babylon represented the entire world at odds with God. He believed that the "great tribulation" would begin in the year 350 AD after the death of the Lord and would last for three and a half years, after which the world would end. Ticonius' commentary played a central role for two centuries. His followers included Primasius of Hadrumetum, Cassiodorus, Apringius, and Bede.

Ticonius also formulated seven hermeneutical principles, of which the fourth (de specie et genere) and the sixth (de recapitulatione) had a significant influence on the exegesis of the Apocalypse. Recapitulatio for him meant the repetition of descriptions previously omitted.

Lactantius believed that history would last six thousand years, after which a thousand-year kingdom would begin. He calculated that two hundred years after his time, the fall of Rome would occur, followed by the rise of ten kingdoms.

Augustine of Hippo did not write a commentary on the Apocalypse, but in the 20th book of De Civitate Dei, he elaborates on the Antichrist, the false prophet, the thousand-year kingdom, Gog and Magog, and the great tribulation. He believed that the "thousand-year kingdom" began with the birth of Christ, but that the thousand years should not be understood literally. The personified Antichrist would rule for three and a half years. Augustine's influence on the exegesis of chapter 20 of the Book of Revelation was significant, and his interpretation of this chapter dominated until the 16th century.

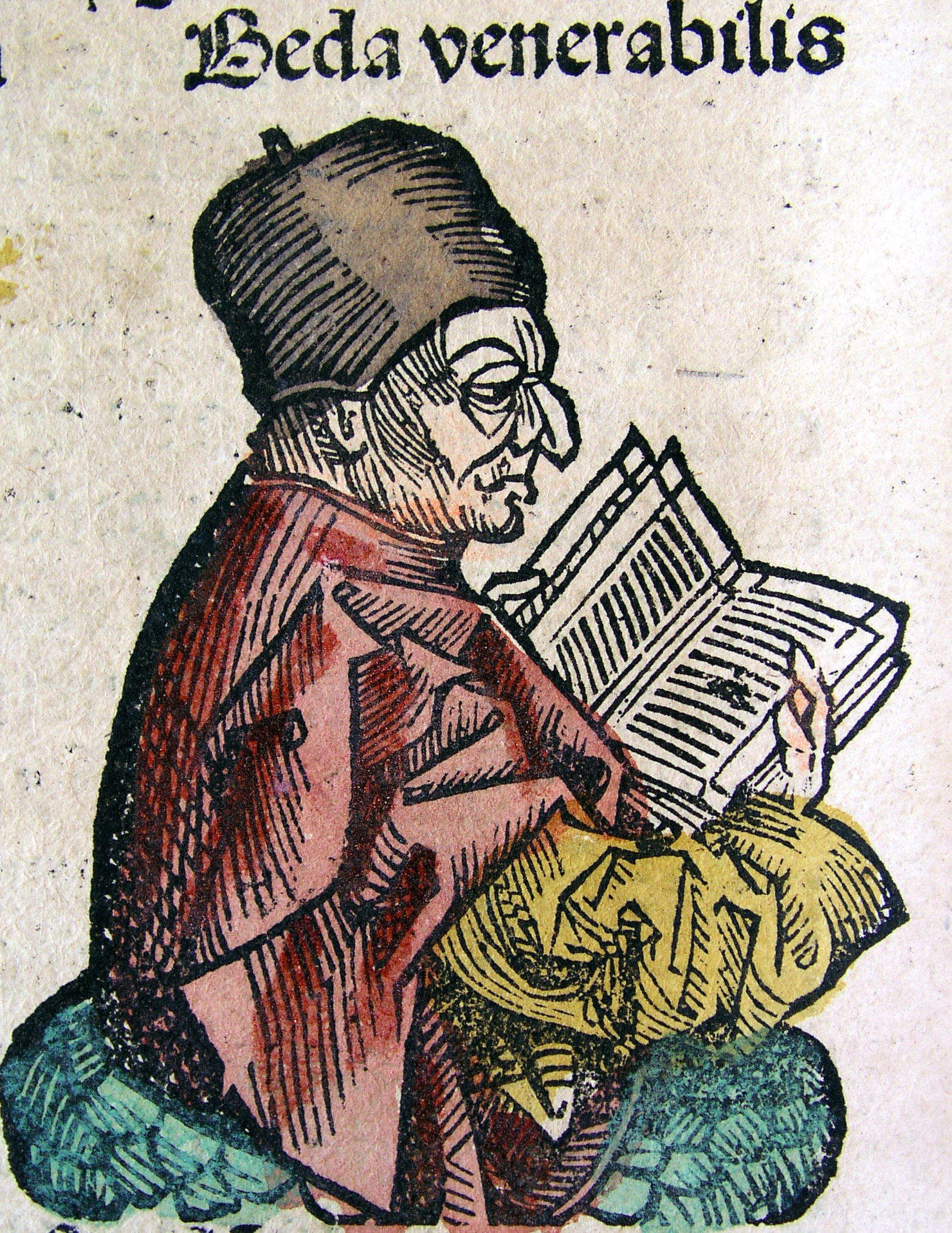
Bede's commentary played a key role until the time of Joachim of Fiore

The next important period in the history of exegesis is associated with Bede, the creator of the quadruple sense of biblical interpretation. He added a mystical sense to the three senses of Andreas of Caesarea, which was later used by scholastics. Bede's commentary (written around 705) was the most important commentary since Ticonius and played a leading role until the time of Joachim of Fiore (d. 1202).

Rupert of Deutz (d. 1135) advocated for a literal interpretation. He opposed the recapitulation of the "trumpets" by the "bowls" and also opposed the interpretation of Anselm of Laon. His commentary influenced Haymo of Faversham and Richard of Saint Victor.

== Scholastic era ==
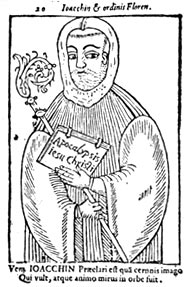
Joachim of Fiore as the creator of historical exegesis

Already Bede introduced a certain element of historio-philosophical interpretation into the Apocalypse. This was further developed by subsequent exegetes (such as Rupert of Deutz), and especially by Joachim of Fiore, a Calabrian Cistercian abbot, who is considered the creator of this interpretative method. He applied recapitulation, identifying the seven "seals" with the seven "trumpets" and seven "bowls". According to him, the Apocalypse describes six periods of the church's struggles. The seventh period was to be the earthly Millennium, which would begin in 1260 (the number 1260 comes from Apocalypse 11:3, where it mentions 1,260 days). He associated the apocalyptic beast with Islam, while the second beast was identified with heretics (primarily the patarini). Joachim interpreted chapter 20 of the Apocalypse in line with Augustine. His approach to recapitulation did not deviate significantly from Bede's system.

The historical exegesis was further developed by Nicholas of Lyra in his 1329 commentary. Unlike Joachim, Nicholas did not use recapitulation. He divided the history of the church into seven epochs:

1. The apostles' struggle with the Jews (chapters 2–3)
2. The martyrs' struggle with Rome (chapters 4–7)
3. The doctors' struggle with the Arians (chapters 8–11)
4. The struggle with Islam (chapters 12–14)
5. The struggle of the church with Babylon (chapters 15–18), with the seven "bowls" representing the history of the Crusades (chapter 16)
6. The time of the Antichrist (chapter 19)
7. The Millennium and eternity (chapters 20–22)

Nicholas of Lyra believed that the number 666 was contained in the name Muhammad. His work was widely distributed and influential. Between 1350 and 1450, around 800 complete manuscript copies and about 700 partial copies were made. It was one of the first works to be printed (1471–1472), and its popularity persisted until the 16th century.

The historical method of interpretation completely dominated exegesis in the late Middle Ages, and the reformers later adopted it. On one hand, this marked a regression in the exegesis of the final biblical book, but on the other hand, it led to the development of exegesis in multiple directions. It is now believed that historical interpretation stemmed from a misunderstanding of the literary genre of the Apocalypse and a limited understanding of the nature of prophecies.

During this period, commentaries by the following authors were also published: the Dominican Jordan of Saxony (d. 1237), William of Auxerre, Bernard of Trilia (d. 1292), and Juan de Torquemada (d. 1468). By the end of the Middle Ages, the Apocalypsis Nova appeared – a kind of dialogue with the archangel Gabriel discussing the truths of the faith. This work, attributed to Amadeus of Portugal (1422–1482), has survived in about 20 manuscripts.

== Modern era ==
=== Protestant exegesis ===
Exegetes of this era employed linguistic analyses and more accurately identified biblical parallels. Protestant exegesis until the 18th century largely followed the paths laid out by Nicholas of Lyra and Joachim of Fiore, adding an anti-papal interpretation of chapter 13. According to Martin Luther, both beasts in chapter 13 represented the empire and the papacy. The papacy healed the mortal wound of the beast and revived the ancient Roman Empire.

In 1528, Francis Lambert authored the first Protestant commentary on the Apocalypse. His interpretation derived from Ticonius, Bede, Haymo, and Walafrid, with the addition of anti-papal readings of chapters 13 and 17. Subsequent German-speaking Protestant commentators included Melchior Hoffman (1530), Sebastian Meyer (1534), Theodore Bibliander (1547), Petrus Artopoeus (1549), Heinrich Bullinger (1557), and Franciscus Junius (1591). They adopted a modified version of Nicholas of Lyra's system, incorporating Luther's interpretation of chapter 13.

John Foxe published the first English Protestant commentary in 1587, influenced by Sebastian Meyer and polemicizing against Jesuit Francisco Ribera. He dated the Millennium from 300 to 1300, marking 1300 as the onset of Ottoman dominance lasting until 1594 (the fifth and sixth apocalyptic trumpets). His reading of chapter 13 followed the approach of German Protestant commentators. Subsequent English commentators included John Napier (1593), Thomas Brightman (1596), and Joseph Mede (1627).

Hugo Grotius was the first Protestant to break away from historiosophy and anti-papal interpretations. His philological and critical insights laid the groundwork for future exegesis, pioneering a historical interpretation of the Apocalypse. Chapters 1–11 depicted the judgment on Judaism, with the seventh trumpet corresponding to the Bar Kokhba revolt. Chapters 12–19 described the judgment on paganism, and chapter 20 referred to the era of Constantine the Great. Grotius identified the "heads of the beast" as successive Roman emperors from Claudius (the first to persecute Christians) to Titus, and the "ten horns" as Roman senators.

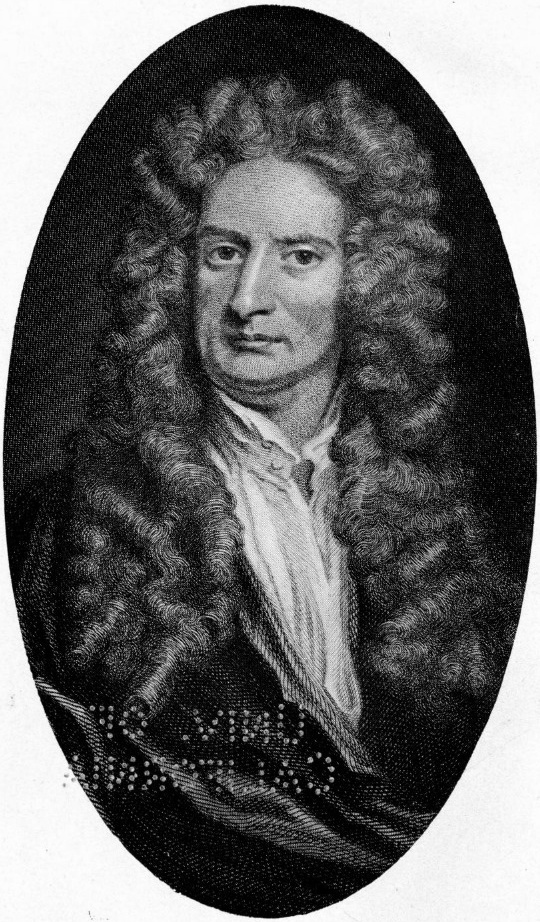
Isaac Newton was interested in the Apocalypse

Isaac Newton (1642–1727) devoted the later years of his life to studying the Apocalypse. His 1733 work Observations... demonstrated his erudition and cautious approach to interpreting the book's imagery and symbols. Newton believed that the prophecies of the Apocalypse could only be fully understood after their fulfillment. He was favorable toward chiliasm and critical of the historiosophical systems of Joachim of Fiore and Nicholas of Lyra.

Johann Albrecht Bengel was among the last proponents of anti-papal interpretations in Protestant exegesis. He identified the "heads of the beast" with seven popes, from Gregory VII to Innocent III. Bengel promoted a dual chiliasm, intertwining his Apocalypse interpretation with fantastical elements. He predicted that in 1836 the Chronus (lasting 1111 1/9 years since 725) would end, ushering in the Nonchronus. He expected the Parousia in 1836, followed by a thousand-year kingdom lasting until 2836, after which Satan would be bound for another millennium. The world would end in 3836.

By the 19th century, historiosophical interpretations of the Apocalypse had nearly disappeared but continued to be maintained by Adventists and Jehovah's Witnesses to this day.

=== Post-tridentine Catholic exegesis ===
After the Council of Trent, there was a revival in Catholic exegesis, which lasted until the end of the Thirty Years' War when it became evident that Protestantism was a lasting phenomenon. The historiosophical system (Islam as the beast) was rejected as inadequate, and two new directions emerged in its place. The first, associated with Hentenius and Salmerón, related the visions of the Apocalypse to the early centuries of Christianity (referred to in German exegesis as Urkirchengeschichtliche Deutung) and was merely a narrowing of the historiosophical system. The symbols of the Apocalypse were connected to pagan Rome and early heresies. From this perspective, the historical system (de Mariana) would later emerge. The second, associated with Francisco Ribera and Cornelius a Lapide, was an eschatological system with certain historiosophical elements (Endgeschichtliche Deutung). Over time, another direction appeared, interpreting the visions of the Apocalypse in the context of the author's contemporary times (Zeitgeschichtliche Deutung).

Dominican John Hentenius (died 1566) and Jesuit Alfonso Salmeron (died 1585) dated the writing of the Book of Revelation to the time of Nero. Jesuit Ludovicus ab Alcasar (died 1613) believed that chapters 5–11 dealt with the church's struggle against the Synagogue, while chapters 12–19 addressed the church's struggle against pagan Rome. This school gained adherents such as the Protestant Hugo Grotius (died 1645), Bishop Jacques-Bénigne Bossuet (died 1704), Antoine Augustin Calmet (died 1757), and Jesuit Louis Billot.

In Jesuit circles during the Counter-Reformation, the eschatological system was revived, with its restorer being F. Ribera (died 1591), who interpreted everything from chapter 4 onward as referring to the end times, but began chapter 20 with the death of Christ and continued to the era of the Antichrist.

Cornelius a Lapide (died 1637) and Menochius (died 1655), following Ribera, interpreted Revelation 6:12–22:21 as referring to the end times and the events immediately preceding them. They treated the Apocalypse as an expansion of the "Little Apocalypse" of the Synoptic Gospels (Matthew 24; Mark 13; Luke 21). The most significant differences among these exegetes concern the identification of the prophecies in Revelation 1:1–6:11 with historical events. This system was very popular in the 17th century thanks to the works of a Lapide, and it still has its supporters today, though in a somewhat modified form.

=== Final era ===
At the end of the 19th century, a debate arose regarding the literary unity of the Book of Revelation (Daniel Völter, Eberhard Vischer, Erbes, Friedrich Spitta, Weiss, and others) and the origins of its symbols (Hermann Gunkel, Albrecht Dieterich, Wilhelm Bousset). These theories had their beginnings with Grotius and Hammond, but contemporary scholars of their time did not take them up. This changed at the end of the 19th century, thanks to Daniel Völter, who published Die Entstehung der Apokalypse in 1882 (with a second edition in 1885) and Das Problem der Apokalypse in 1893. In these works, he proposed a two-source hypothesis. The first source – Proto-Apocalypse – was attributed to John Mark, written between 65 and 66 (adjusted to 62 in 1893). The second source – Cerinthus' Apocalypse – was authored by the heresiarch Cerinthus between 68 and 69 (adjusted to 68–70 in 1893). These sources were redacted in two subsequent compilations during the reigns of Trajan and Hadrian. This hypothesis attracted the interest of other biblical scholars, each reconstructing the hypothetical sources differently.

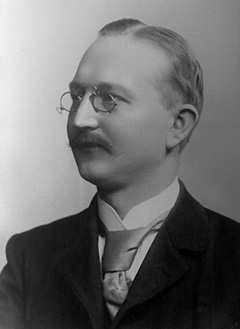
Hermann Gunkel

Hermann Gunkel shifted the focus of inquiry toward the dependency of the Book of Revelation on pagan myths. In his work Schöpfung und Chaos in Urzeit und Endzeit, he criticized the Zeitgeschichtliche Deutung (on pages 202–235) and introduced a new interpretive method, the Traditionsgeschichtliche Methode. According to this method, the symbols in Revelation were borrowed from Babylonian mythology.

Wilhelm Bousset (1865–1920) published Der Antichrist in 1895, in which he argued against Gunkel's core thesis. Using the eschatological concept of the Antichrist as an example, Bousset demonstrated that the symbolism of Revelation is primarily rooted in Jewish and Christian apocalyptic traditions, with any potential influences from Babylonian mythology being secondary.

The most notable commentaries from this period are those of Bousset (1896 1906), Charles (1920), Lohmeyer (1926), and Allo (1933). Following the contributions of Bousset, Charles, and Lohmeyer, many exegetes believed that little remained to be done, and only sporadically engaged with the exegesis of this book.

== See also ==
- Commentary on Revelation

== Bibliography ==
- Jankowski, Augustyn (1959). Apokalipsa świętego Jana [Book of Revelation] (in Polish). Poznań: Pallottinum.
- Bousset, Wilhelm (1906). Die Offenbarung Johannis [The Revelation of John] (in German). Göttingen: Vandenhoeck und Ruprecht.
- Stefaniak, Ludwik (1957). Interpretacja 12 rozdziału Apokalipsy św. Jana w świetle historii egzegezy [Interpretation of Chapter 12 of the Book of Revelation in Light of the History of Exegesis] (in Polish). Poznań: Pallottinum.
- Kealy, Sean P. (1987). The Apocalypse of John. Liturgical Press. ISBN 0-8146-5581-5.
- Wielgus, Stanisław (1990). Badania nad Biblia̧ w starożytności i w średniowieczu [Research on the Bible in Antiquity and the Middle Ages] (in Polish). Lublin: Tow. Nauk. Katolickiego Uniwersytetu Lubelskiego.
