= Non-Berengaudus =

The enlarged initial C in the right column is the start of the non-Berengaudus commentary in the illuminated manuscript CCCC 20. The Latin and French text of Revelation is in the left column.

The non-Berengaudus commentary (or gloss) is an anonymous commentary on the Book of Revelation. It was translated from Latin into Old French in the 13th century and survives as such in prose and in verse, always accompanying a French translation of Revelation. The designation "non-Berengaudus" has become customary to distinguish it from the commentary of Berengaudus, which was also translated into Old French, as in the Trinity Apocalypse.

The non-Berengaudus commentary has its own distinctive picture cycle, forming the smaller of two branches of the English Gothic illuminated Apocalypse tradition. The other branch uses the Berengaudus commentary. In the non-Berengaudus tradition, the miniatures are usually irregularly dispersed and heavily painted. The core group of non-Berengaudus illustrated manuscripts are the Corpus-Lambeth stem.

== Origins ==
The earliest manuscript of the non-Berengaudus gloss, from about 1250, is the Paris Apocalypse (BnF fr. 403). Léopold Delisle and Paul Meyer argued that the translator of the prose French translation of Revelation in the Paris Apocalypse also translated the non-Berengaudus commentary from a Latin original. They further argue that the glosses on Revelation in the moralized Bibles and a certain manuscript of the Osuna collection in Madrid represent abridged versions of the original Latin text of the non-Berengaudus. The non-Berengaudus is a "variant version" of the commentary in the Glossa Ordinaria. Suzanne Lewis argues that the moralized Bible's commentary is a "more abbreviated" version based on the same Latin original.

The commentary was composed between 1150 and 1250, probably closer to the latter date. Delisle and Meyer associated it with the rise of the mendicant orders in the early 13th century. They favoured attributing it to a Franciscan author, but Olwen Rhys argues for a Dominican. The author was probably French, possibly Norman. The purpose of the new commentary was to update the conservative and monastic commentary of Berengaudus for a secular and mendicant audience.

== Content ==
The prologue to the commentary proper distinguishes between those prophecies in Revelation that have been fulfilled, are being fulfilled and are yet to be fulfilled and between three kinds of vision:

Because this book, among the other books of the New Testament, is called prophecy, St. John saw in the spirit and announced the secrets of Jesus Christ and Holy Church, those which have in large part been fulfilied, and those now in the present, and those which are still to come. . . . However, because John saw them in the spirit, and holy Scripture distinguishes three kinds of vision, it would be well to understand how he saw them in the spirit: for one vision is corporeal, when we see something with our bodily eyes; another is spiritual or imaginary, when we see in dreams [sleep] or in waking imagination something which signifies something else; the third kind of vision is called intellectual, when the Holy Spirit illuminates the understanding of man's soul and makes him see with spiritual eyes the truth of God's secrets. And in this way St. John not only saw the figures but understood their meaning.

Compared to the Berengaudus commentary, the non-Berengaudus is more pastoral, evincing more concern with penitence, penance and preaching. It is more current, influenced as it is by the Crusades and church reform. It sometimes refers to "this century" (ceste siecle).

== Translation history ==
Page from Yates Thompson 10 illustrating the first three verses of Revelation 7

In the Paris Apocalypse, the prose commentary begins with the words "Par seint Johan sunt signifie lui bon prelatz". This version is found in at least twenty manuscripts. A set of Anglo-Norman prose extracts are used as glosses in three manuscripts of the Anglo-Norman Revelacion, a versified translation. It begins "Ceste livre entre les autres livres del novel testament est dit prophesie." In the Giffard Apocalypse, the non-Berengaudus gloss was versified and intercalated with another verse translation of Revelation (distinct from Revelacion).

The non-Berengaudus commentary was twice adapted into Middle English. A prose paraphrase is found in British Library MS Additional 18633, based on the same version found with Revelacion. An English translation more closely related to the Paris version is found in the English Apocalypse.

== Corpus-Lambeth stem ==
The six manuscripts of the Corpus-Lambeth stem are:

- Cambridge, Corpus Christi College, MS 394 (13th century)
- London, Lambeth Palace, MS 75 (13th century)
- Paris, Bibliothèque Nationale, MS fr. 9574 (13th century)
- Oxford, University College, MS 100 (14th century)
- Cambridge, University Library, MS Gg.1.1 (14th century)
- London, British Library, MS Yates Thompson 10 (14th century)

The non-Berengaudus gloss increased in popularity in the 14th century.

== Bibliography ==
- Dean, Ruth; Bolton, Maureen (1999). Anglo-Norman Literature: A Guide to Texts and Manuscripts. Anglo-Norman Text Society.
- Delisle, Léopold; Meyer, Paul, eds. (1901). L'Apocalypse en franrais au XIII^{e} siecle (Bibl. nat. fr. 403): Introduction et texte. Paris.
- Fox, J. C. (1912). "The Earliest French Apocalypse and Commentary". The Modern Language Review. 7 (4): 445–468. JSTOR 3713172.
- James, M. R. (1931). The Apocalypse in Art. Oxford University Press.
- Laing, Aileen H. (1977). "The Corpus-Lambeth Stem: A Study of French Prose Apocalypse Manuscripts – Abstract". Manuscripta. 21 (1): 17–18.
- Lewis, Suzanne (1990). "The Enigma of Fr. 403 and the Compilation of a Thirteenth-Century English Illustrated Apocalypse". Gesta. 29 (1): 31–43. JSTOR 767098.
- Lewis, Suzanne (1995). Reading Images: Narrative Discourse and Reception in the Thirteenth-Century Illuminated Apocalypse. Cambridge University Press.
- Nolan, Barbara (1977). The Gothic Visionary Perspective. Princeton University Press.
- Pitts, Brent A.; Furnish, Shearle (2006). "The Middle English Apocalypse Gloss in British Library MS Additional 18633". Notes and Queries. 53 (3): 293–295.
- Pitts, Brent A., ed. (2010). Revelacion (BL Royal 2.D.xiii). Anglo-Norman Text Society.
- Rhys, Olwen, ed. (1946). A Rhymed Anglo-Norman Apocalypse with Commentary. Anglo-Norman Text Society.
