= Textual variants in the Book of Revelation =

Textual variants in the Book of Revelation are the subject of the study called textual criticism of the New Testament. Textual variants in manuscripts arise when a copyist makes deliberate or inadvertent alterations to a text that is being reproduced. An abbreviated list of textual variants in the Book of Revelation is given in this article below.

Most of the variations are not significant and some common alterations include the deletion, rearrangement, repetition, or replacement of one or more words when the copyist's eye returns to a similar word in the wrong location of the original text. If their eye skips to an earlier word, they may create a repetition (error of dittography). If their eye skips to a later word, they may create an omission. They may resort to performing a rearranging of words to retain the overall meaning without compromising the context. In other instances, the copyist may add text from memory from a similar or parallel text in another location. Otherwise, they may also replace some text of the original with an alternative reading. Spellings occasionally change. Synonyms may be substituted. A pronoun may be changed into a proper noun (such as "he said" becoming "Jesus said"). John Mill's 1707 Greek New Testament was estimated to contain some 30,000 variants in its accompanying textual apparatus which was based on "nearly 100 [Greek] manuscripts." Peter J. Gurry puts the number of non-spelling variants among New Testament manuscripts around 500,000, though he acknowledges his estimate is higher than all previous ones.

== Legend ==
A guide to the sigla (symbols and abbreviations) most frequently used in the body of this article.

General sigla
# beginning with 0: uncial
# not beginning with 0: minuscule
^{*} superscript: original reading
^{c} superscript: scribal correction
^{ms} superscript: individual manuscript
^{mss} superscript: multiple manuscripts
^{pt} superscript: partial attestation
^{vid} superscript: uncertain reading
arab: Arabic versions
arm: Armenian versions
𝔐 or Byz: Byzantine text-type
cop: Coptic versions

sa: Sahidic version
bo: Boharic version

eth: Ethiopic versions
ƒ: Greek manuscripts family
geo: Georgian versions
goth: Gothic versions
it: Italic/Vetus Latina
lat: most Italic and Vulgate
latt: all Italic and Vulgate
𝔓: papyrus
𝑙: individually numbered lectionary
Lect: most or all numbered lectionaries
parenthesized (): approximate reading
rell: all other extant manuscripts
slav: Slavic versions
syr: Syriac versions
vg: Latin Vulgate
ς: Textus Receptus

Uncial sigla
א: Codex Sinaiticus (01)
A: Codex Alexandrinus (02)
B: Codex Vaticanus (03)
C: Codex Ephraemi Rescriptus (04)
D^{ea}: Codex Bezae (05)
D^{p}: Codex Claromontanus (06)
K^{e}: Codex Cyprius (017)
K^{ap}: Codex Mosquensis I (018)
L^{e}: Codex Regius (New Testament) (019)
L^{ap}: Codex Angelicus (020)
P^{apr}: Codex Porphyrianus (025)
S: Codex Vaticanus 354 (028)
V: Codex Mosquensis II (031)
W: Codex Washingtonianus (032)
Z: Codex Dublinensis (035)
Γ: Codex Tischendorfianus IV (036)
Δ: Codex Sangallensis 48 (037)
Θ: Codex Koridethi (038)
Ξ: Codex Zacynthius (040)
Π: Codex Petropolitanus (New Testament) (041)
Φ: Codex Beratinus (043)
Ψ: Codex Athous Lavrensis (044)
Ω: Codex Athous Dionysiou (045)
ff^{1}: Codex Corbeiensis I
ff^{2}: Codex Corbeiensis II
g^{1}: Codex Sangermanensis I
k: Codex Bobiensis

Critical editions
T8th: Tischendorf's 8th Edition of Editio Octava Critica Maior
WH: Westcott and Hort (1881)
NA: Novum Testamentum Graece (Nestle–Aland)
UBS: United Bible Societies
ECM: Editio Critica Maior

== Textual variants ==
Textual variants in the Book of Revelation
2 Textual variants in Revelation 1

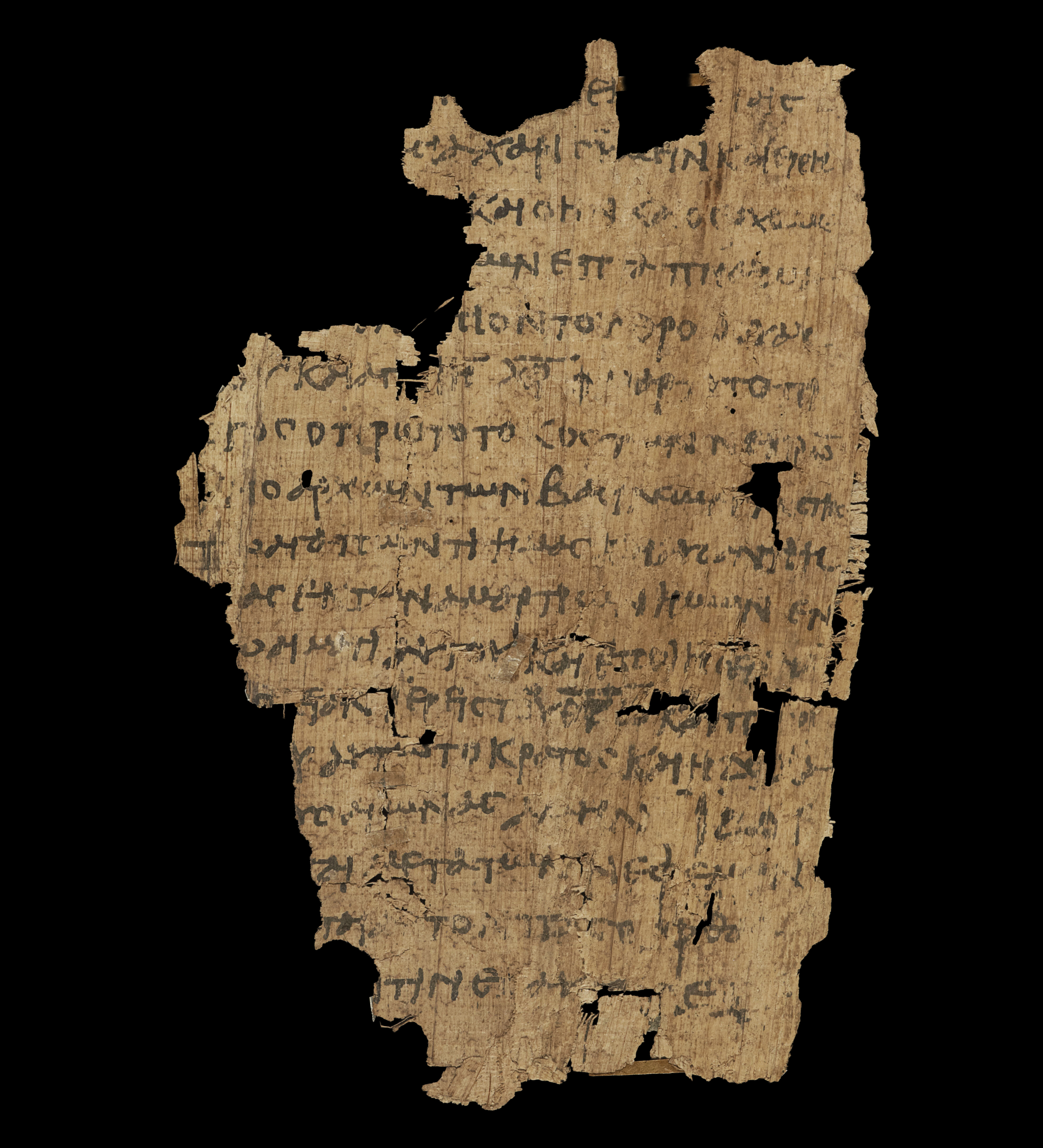
Revelation 1:4-7 in 𝔓^{18}

Revelation 1:5

λυσαντι ημας εκ ('freed us from') – 𝔓^{18}, א^{c}, A, C, 2020, 2081, 2814
λουσαντι ημας απο ('washed us from') – P, 046, 94, 1006, 1859, 2042, 2065, 2073, 2138, 2432

Revelation 1:6

βασιλειαν ('kingdom') – א, A, 046, 1854, 2050, 2351
βασιλεις ('kings') – P, Byz^{A}

0 Textual variants in Revelation 2

Revelation 2:1

0 Textual variants in Revelation 3

Revelation 3:1

0 Textual variants in Revelation 4

Revelation 4:1

1 Textual variants in Revelation 5

Revelation 5:9

ἠγόρασας τῷ θεῷ ('redeemed to God') – A, eth
ἠγόρασας τῷ θεῷ ἡμας ('redeemed to God us') – 046, 1006, 1611, 1859, 2020, 2042, 2053, 2065, 2081, 2138, 2432, cop^{bo} א
ἠγόρασας ἡμας τῷ θεῷ ('redeemed us to God') – 94, 1828, 2073, 2344, cop^{sa}
ἠγόρασας ἡμας ('redeemed us') – 2065*, 2814, Cyprian

0 Textual variants in Revelation 6

Revelation 6:1

0 Textual variants in Revelation 7

Revelation 7:1

1 Textual variants in Revelation 8

Revelation 8:13

αετου – א, A, P^{115}, 046, 1424, 1841, 1862, 93, 456, 627, 920, 1611, 2329, 2351, Byz, Philoxenian, Harklean, Vulgate, Old Latin, Boharic, Sahidic, Ethiopic, Georgian, Ansbert, Bede, Oikoumenios, Primasius, Caesarius, Tyconius
αγγελου – P, 2074, 104, 241, 256, 2059, 2081, 620, 922, 2186, 2286, 2814, Byz^{A}, Armenian, Slavonic, Andreas, Victorious
αγγελου ως αετου — 42, Oikoumenios^{comm}

0 Textual variants in Revelation 9

Revelation 9:1

0 Textual variants in Revelation 10

Revelation 10:1

2 Textual variants in Revelation 11

Revelation 11:17

ο ων και ο ην και ο ερχομενος — Boharic, Tyconius, Beatus, 1841, 051, 2074, 35, 1006, 911/2040, 1740, 469, 757
ο ων και ο ην και — P^{47}, Sinaiticus, 0308, C, 2344
ο ων και ο ην — Byz, 2814

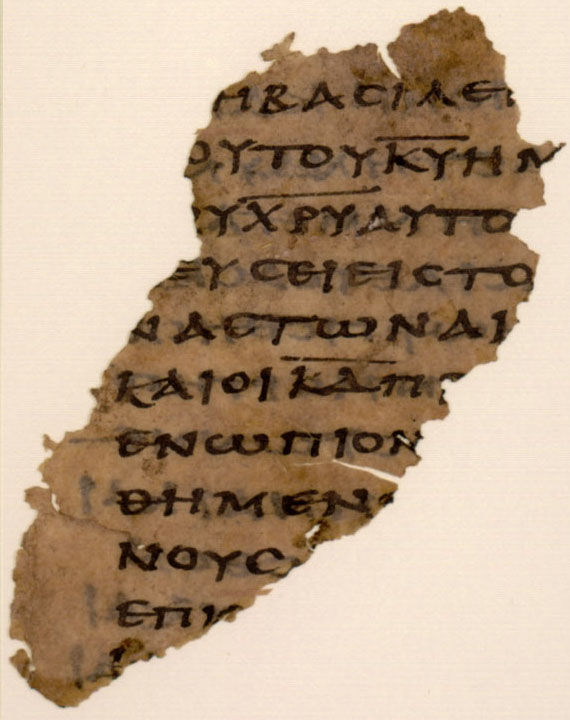
Revelation 11:18 in Uncial 0308, the reading "Servants and prophets"

Revelation 11:18

τοις δουλοις σου και τοις προφηταις ('thy servants and prophets') – 𝔓^{47}, א, 0308
τοις δουλοις σου τοις προφηταις ('thy servants prophets') – A, Byz

0 Textual variants in Revelation 12

Revelation 12:1

1 Textual variants in Revelation 13

Revelation 13:18

εξακοσιοι εξηκοντα εξ ('six hundred sixty-six') – א A P 046, most minuscules, Byz^{pt} lat syr cop arm eth Irenaeus Hippolytus Origen Victorinus Gregory Primasius Andrew Beatus Arethas
χ̅ξ̅ϲ̅ ('666') – 𝔓^{47} 051 Byz^{pt}
εξακοσιοι εξηκοντα πεντε ('six hundred sixty-five') – 2344
εξακοσιοι τεσσαρακοντα εξ ('six hundred forty-six') – it^{ar}
εξακοσιοι δεκα εξ ('six hundred sixteen') – C vg^{ms} Irenaeus^{mss} Tyconius^{pt} Caesarius
χ̅ι̅ϲ̅ ('616') – 𝔓^{115}

0 Textual variants in Revelation 14

Revelation 14:1

0 Textual variants in Revelation 15

Revelation 15:1

0 Textual variants in Revelation 16

Revelation 16:1

0 Textual variants in Revelation 17

Revelation 17:1

1 Textual variants in Revelation 18

Revelation 18:20

αγιοι αποστολοι — C, 051, 2329, 35, 2059, 2081, 2344, 2186, 2286, 2814, Vg^{Cl}, it^{gig}, Byz^{A}
αγιοι και οι αποστολοι — Sinaiticus, A, P, 046, 1424, 1841, 1862, 82, 93, 456, 627, 920, 1611, 2074, 2053, 2062, Byz
αγγελου και οι αποστολοι — Hippolytus, syr^{har}

0 Textual variants in Revelation 19

Revelation 19:1

0 Textual variants in Revelation 20

Revelation 20:1

0 Textual variants in Revelation 21

Revelation 21:1

1 Textual variants in Revelation 22

Revelation 22:14

ποιουντες τας εντολας αυτου ('those who do His commandments') – 046 94 205 209 1611^{supp} 1854 1859 2030 2042 2065 2073 2138 2329 2377 2432 2814 Byz it^{gig} syr cop^{bo} (Tertullian) Cyprian Tyconius (Caesarius) Andrew (Beatus) Arethas
τηρουντες τας εντολας αυτου ('those who keep His commandments') – arm
πλυνοντες τας στολας αυτων ('those who wash their robes') – א A 1006 1841 2020 (2050) 2053 2062 it^{mss} vg cop^{sa} eth Ambrose Apringius Fulgentius (Primasius) Haymo

== See also ==
- Alexandrian text-type
- Biblical inerrancy
- Byzantine text-type
- Caesarean text-type
- Categories of New Testament manuscripts
- Comparison of codices Sinaiticus and Vaticanus
- List of New Testament verses not included in modern English translations
- Textual variants in the New Testament
- Western text-type
