= Picture Book of the Life of Saint John and the Apocalypse =

Illuminated manuscript of the Apocalypse and Life of St. John, c. 1400

- The British Library, Additional MS 38121
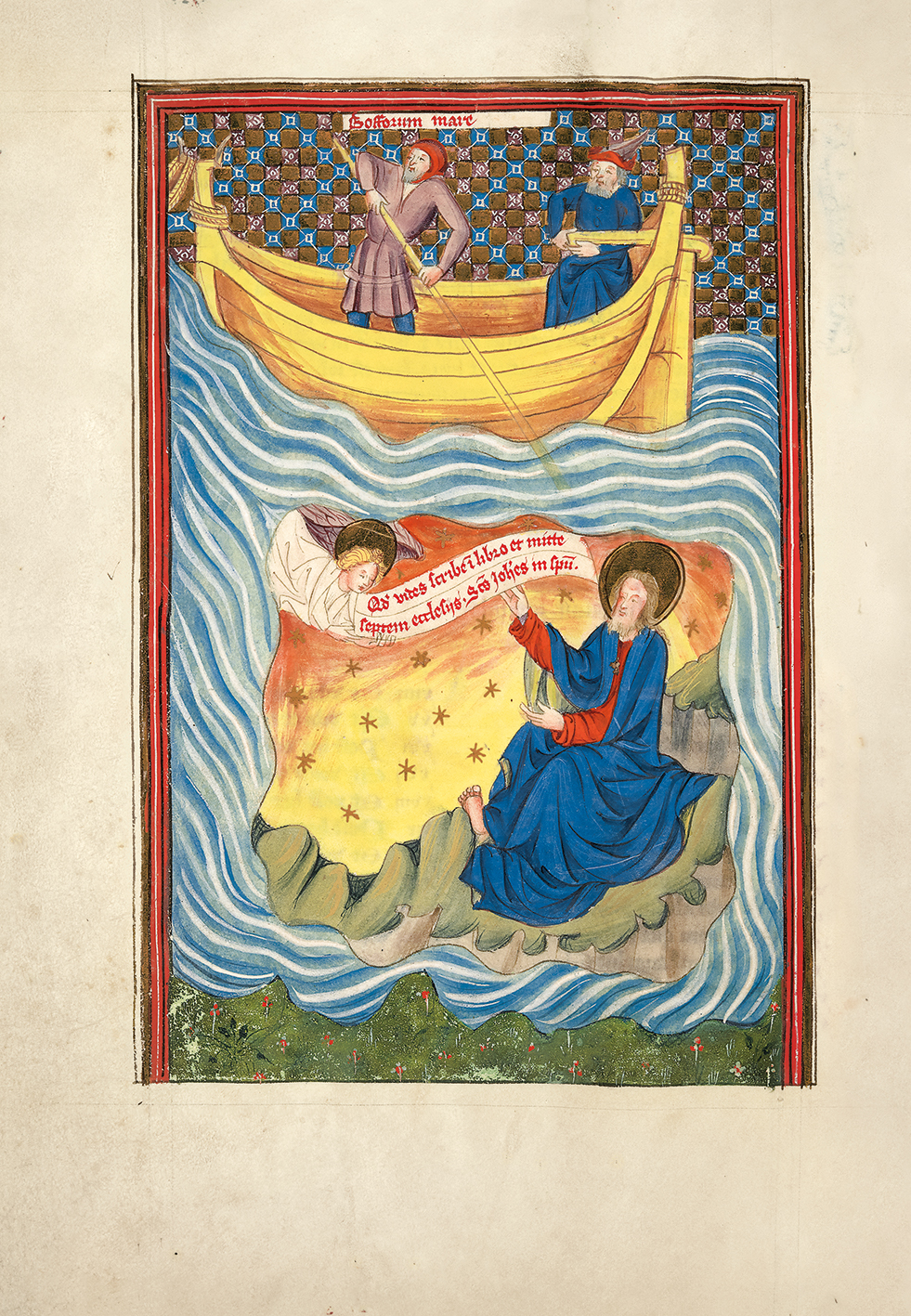
- John on Patmos
- Also known as: Tongerlo Apocalypse
- Date: c. 1400
- Place of origin: Southern Netherlands
- Material: parchment
- Size: 335 × 230 mm; 47 leaves
- Script: Gothic (textualis semi-quadrata)
- Contents: Book of Revelation, Berengaudus' commentary, Life of Antichrist, and Life of John
- Illumination: 94 miniatures
- Previously kept: Tongerlo Abbey (present-day Belgium)

The Picture Book of the Life of Saint John and the Apocalypse (London, British Library, Additional MS 38121) is an illuminated manuscript that combines the biblical Book of Revelation with the legendary Life of John in a picture-book format, that is, a sequence of continuous images in which textual elements are integrated directly into the illustrations. Stylistic features indicate a southern Netherlandish origin: the manuscript was likely produced around 1400, most probably in Brabant. Internal evidence together with surviving archival records suggests that it may have been made for, or at least was early on associated with, the Abbey of Tongerlo.

This codex belongs to the tradition of thirteenth-century English picture-book Apocalypses, yet it diverges from its predecessors in notable ways. Whereas earlier examples relied on tinted drawings, the British Library manuscript employs fully painted miniatures enriched with gold. Moreover, unlike the earlier picture-book Apocalypses, it also incorporates the complete Vulgate text of Revelation, in addition to the explanatory inscriptions and labels embedded within the images themselves.

== Contents and decoration ==
The Picture Book of the Life of Saint John and the Apocalypse comprises 47 folios with 94 miniatures, most of them half-page images arranged in double registers. It presents an extensive pictorial cycle of the Book of Revelation, supplemented by five scenes from the Life of Antichrist (inserted into Revelation chapter 11), all framed by episodes from the legendary Life of John. The manuscript opens with scenes from John's life before his exile on Patmos, followed by his apocalyptic visions. After the conclusion of the Revelation, the narrative transitions seamlessly back to his legendary biography, depicting his return from exile and his final years in Ephesus.

Despite its essentially visual character, the manuscript incorporates a substantial amount of text. Most significant are the captions and labels embedded within the miniatures, drawn chiefly from the Book of Revelation and the 9th-century commentary by the monk Berengaudus. Running parallel, though not synchronised with the imagery, is the Vulgate text of Revelation, preceded by a preface (attributed to Saint Jerome) and a chapter list.

The manuscript belongs to the long-lived tradition of Anglo-French picture-book Apocalypses, a genre that originated in mid-thirteenth-century England with two closely related works: the Morgan Apocalypse (New York, Morgan Library & Museum, MS M.524) and the Bodleian Apocalypse (Oxford, Bodleian Library, MS Auct. D.4.17). These early picture books, probably descending from a lost Anglo-French archetype, established a stable iconographic program that persisted for more than a century and a half, as seen also in the Rylands Apocalypse (Manchester, John Rylands Library, Latin MS 19, c. 1360–70).

Although the British Library manuscript compositions follow established picture-book iconography, its richly painted surfaces depart from the earlier line-drawing and colour-wash style. Heavy pigments, extensive gilding, and sumptuous gold grounds reflect the opulent courtly taste of the Burgundian Netherlands and contrast sharply, standing in sharp contrast to, for example, the emerging French preference for grisaille. A hallmark of its decoration is the pervasive diapering of backgrounds: elaborate grids of gilded and coloured squares, accented with fine white linework, which create intricate diamond patterns that further enhance the manuscript's splendour. The compositions show the influence of contemporary block-book Apocalypses. Variations in facial modelling, drapery treatment, colour palette, and hatching suggest that at least three artists collaborated in its production.

== Gallery ==
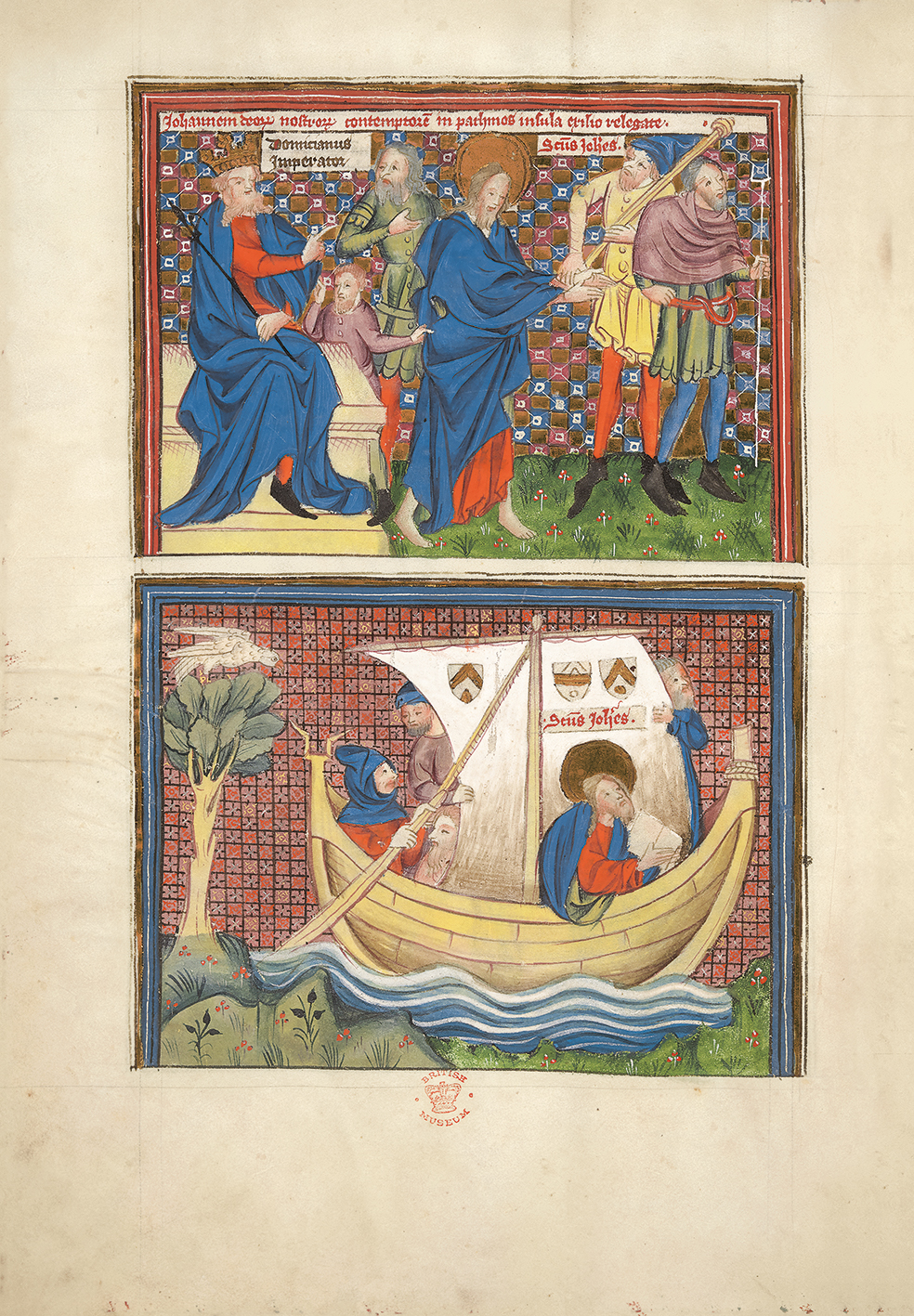
Life of John: Domitian exiles John / John sails to Patmos, f. 2v

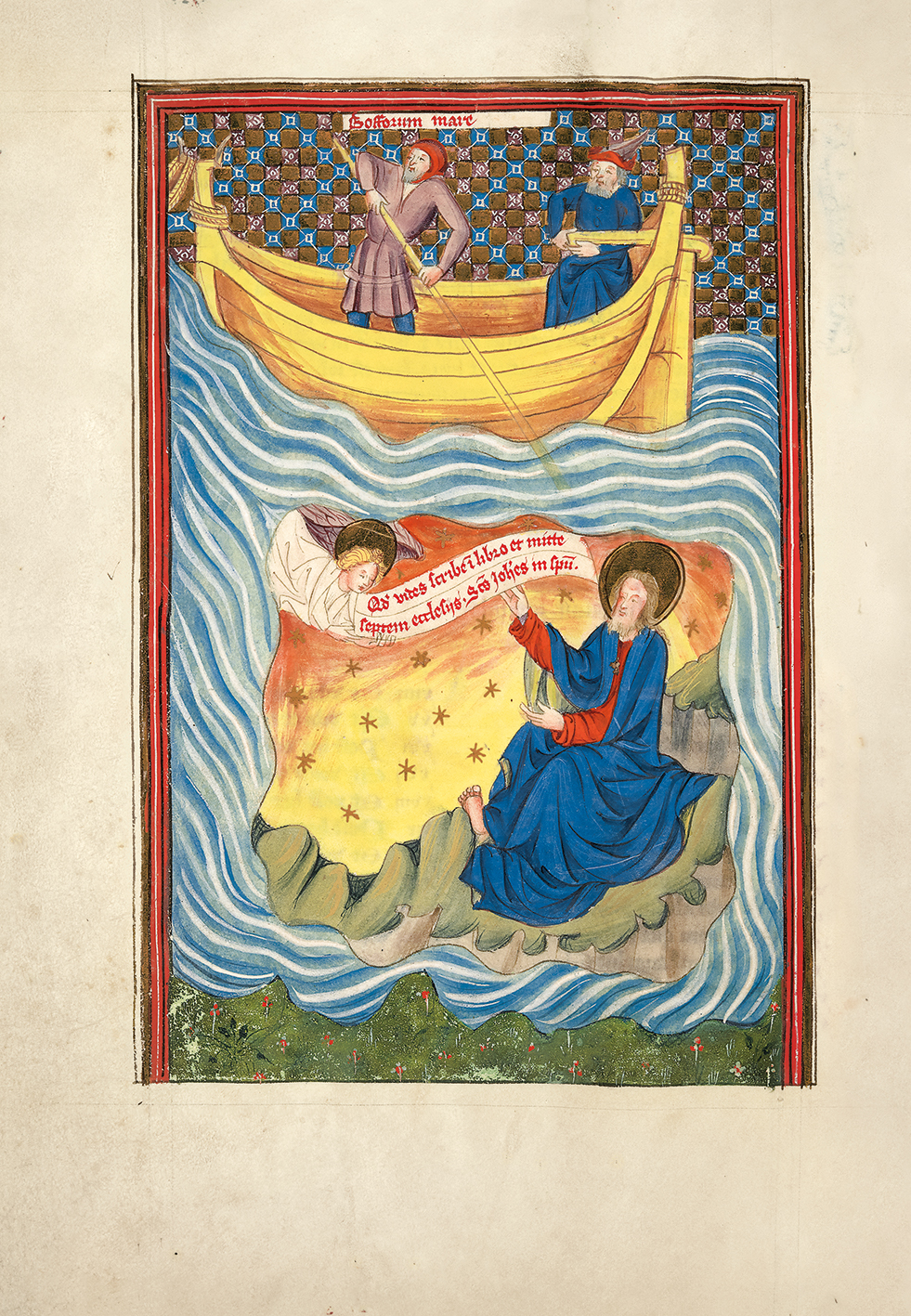
John on Patmos, f. 3v

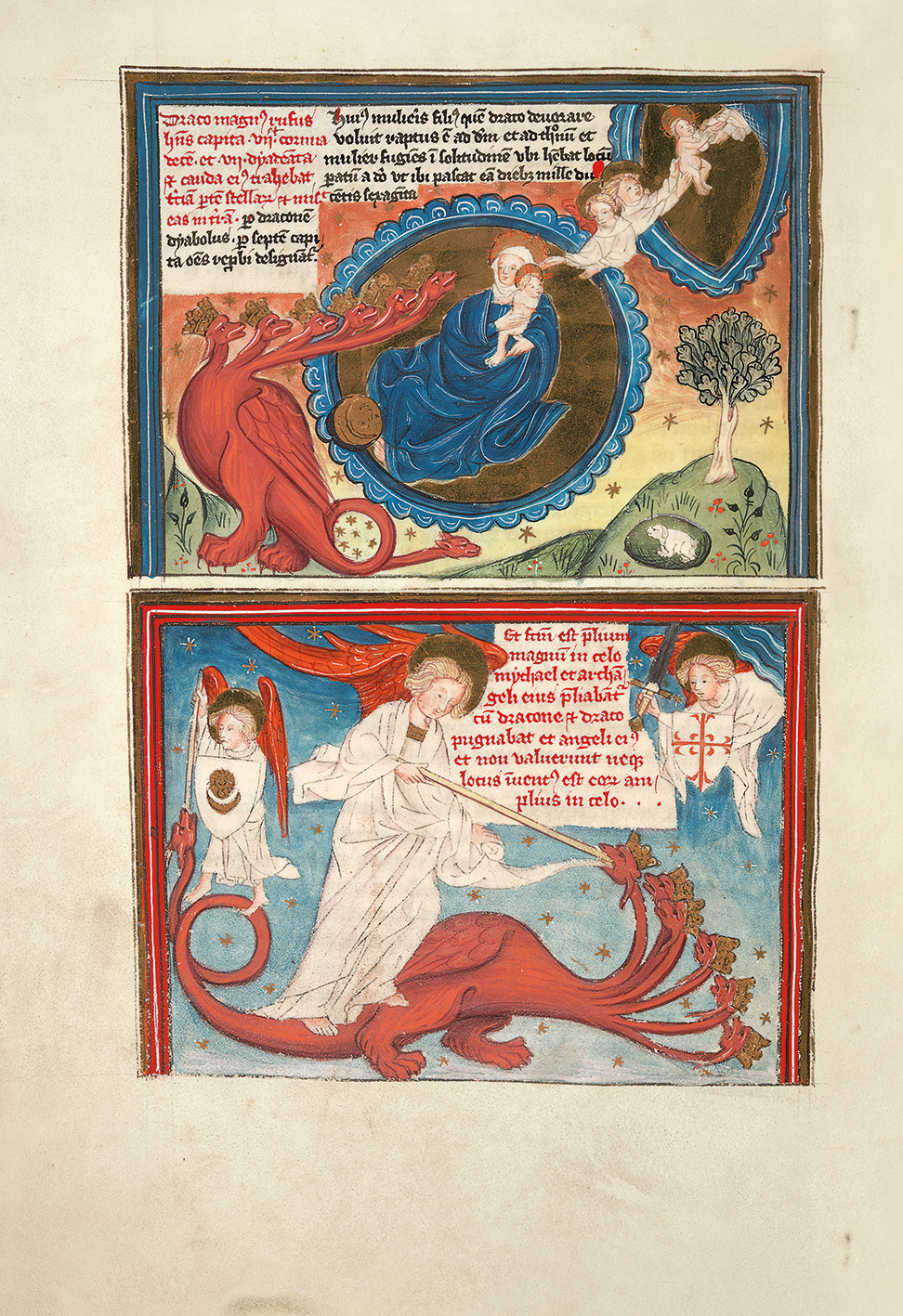
Woman harassed by the Dragon / Michael and angels attack the Dragon, f. 20v

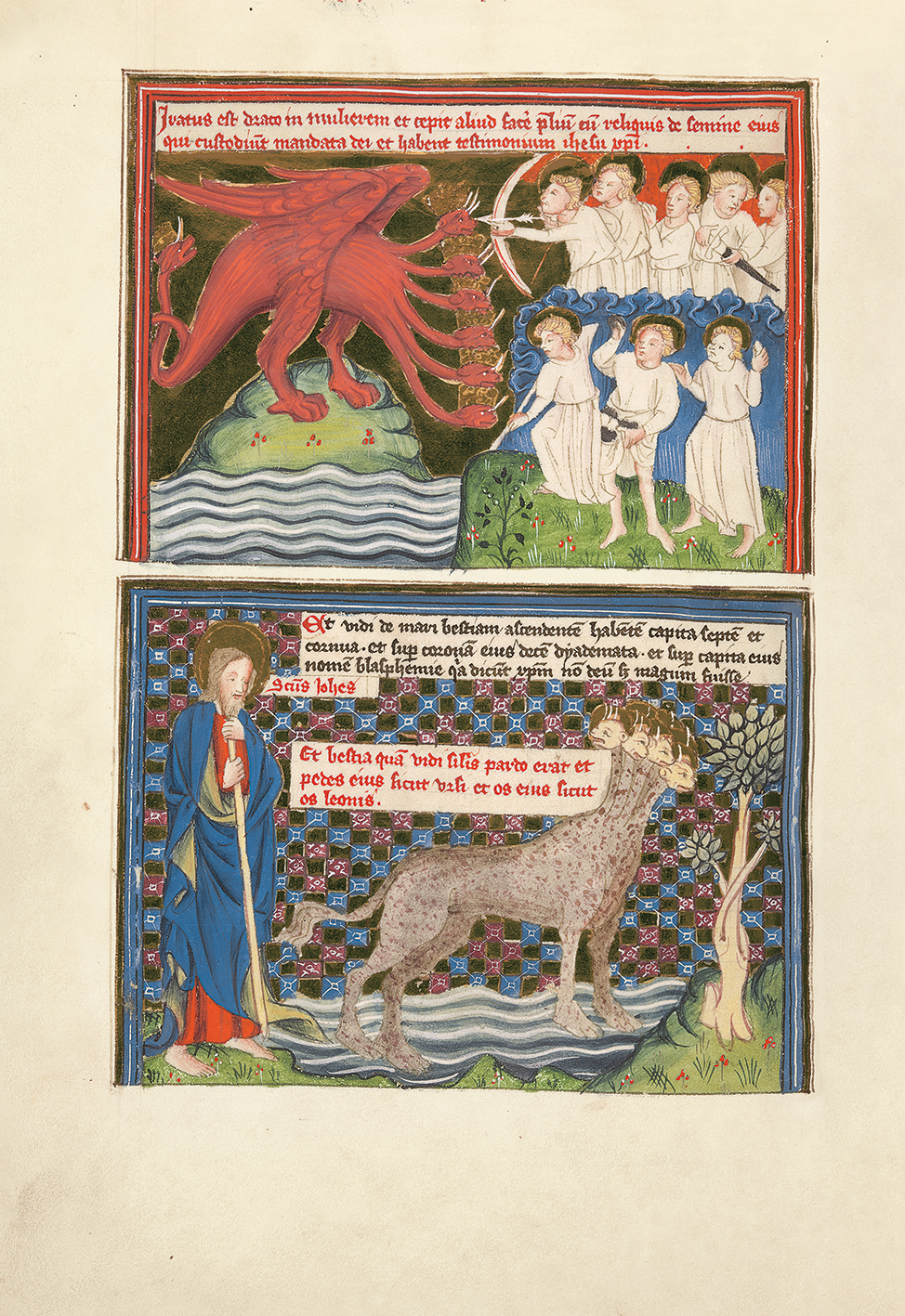
The Seed of the Woman fight the Dragon / Beast from the Sea, f. 23v
