= Commentary on Revelation =

The Lamb and the Four Living Creatures, from the Silos Beatus, an illustrated commentary on Revelation

There have been many commentaries on the biblical Book of Revelation, also called the Apocalypse of Saint John.

== Commentary traditions ==
=== Eastern ===
Around 200, Gaius of Rome wrote a commentary intending to refute Revelation. It is not extant, being known only through fragments of a commentary by Hippolytus of Rome designed to refute it. Although other Greek commentaries were written over the next three centuries, none is extant. Melito of Sardis and Origen of Alexandria are sometimes thought to have written such commentaries, but this is uncertain. The first Greek commentary that survives complete is that of Oecumenius from around 550. It was a major influence on the most influential of Greek commentaries, that of Andrew of Caesarea, written a half-century later.

The earliest Coptic and Syriac commentaries are anonymous and roughly contemporary with Andrew of Caesarea. In the 10th century, a Slavonic translation of Andrew's commentary appeared and a Georgian translation by Euthymius the Athonite. An Armenian translation by Nerses of Lambron appeared in the 12th century. The entire Easter commentary tradition refers back to the Gaius–Hippolytus controversy.

=== Western ===
The earliest Latin commentary on Revelation was written on the eastern edge of the Latin-speaking world by Victorinus of Pettau around 300. Victorinus tended to see the fulfillment of the prophecies of the book taking place in his own day, which coincided with the Diocletianic Persecution. He was a chiliast, seeing a future millennial reign of Christ before the end of the world. A century later, Jerome reworked Victorinus' commentary. His revised edition remained influential throughout the medieval period.

The second Latin commentary was written by Ticonius from a Donatist perspective. It would probably have been ignored had its exegesis not been appreciated by Ticonius's critic and fellow African, Augustine of Hippo. Ticonius's influence, through Augustine, was extensive. A third African, Primasius of Hadrumetum, stands at the head of the orthodox Latin commentary tradition. He combined the exegesis of the heterodox Victorinus and Ticonius but read in light of Jerome and Augustine's more orthodox interpretations.

== List of commentators ==
=== Patristic period ===
==== Coptic ====
- Pseudo-Cyril of Alexandria (7th century), Apocalypse Commentary

==== Greek ====
- Gaius of Rome (c. 200), wrote a critical commentary (fragmentary)
- Hippolytus of Rome (3rd century), Apologia pro apocalypsi et evangelio Joannis apostoli et evangelistae (fragmentary)
- Nepos of Arsinoë (3rd century)
- Dionysius of Alexandria (3rd century)
- Scholia in Apocalypsin (3rd century)
- Oecumenius (518), Commentarius in Apocalypsin
- Didymus the Blind (4th century), Fragmentum in Apocalypsim
- Andrew of Caesarea (7th century), Commentarius in Apocalypsin

==== Latin ====
- Victorinus of Pettau (3rd century), Commentarii in Apocalypsin
- Ticonius (380), Commentarii in Apocalypsim (fragmentary), from a Donatist perspective
- Jerome (398), Commentarii in Apocalypsin, a revision and prologue to Victorinus
- Caesarius of Arles (537), Explanatio in Apocalypsin
- Primasius of Hadrumetum (540), Commentarius in Apocalypsin
- Apringius (548), Tractatus in Apocalypsin (fragmentary)
- Cassiodorus (580), Complexiones in Apocalypsin
- Commemoratorium de Apocalypsi Johannis Apostoli (c. 600), part of the Irish Reference Bible, misattributed to Jerome and Isidore
- De septem sigillis (6th–7th century), misattributed to Alcuin
- Pseudo-Jerome, Commemoratorium de Apocalypsi Johannis apostoli (6th–8th century?)
- Paterius (7th century), De Testimoniis in Apocalypsin S. Joannis Apostoli
- Bede (710), Expositio Apocalypseos
- Ambrose Autpert (778), Expositio in Apocalypsin
- Beatus of Liébana (786), Commentary on the Apocalypse, surviving in many illuminated Beatus manuscripts
- De enigmatibus ex Apocalypsi Johannis (8th century), anonymous

==== Syriac ====
- Commentary on the Apocalypse (6th–7th century)

=== Medieval commentators ===
==== Arabic ====
- Bulus al-Bushi (c. 1250), Commentary on the Apocalypse of John
- Ibn Katib Qaysar (c. 1266), Commentary on the Apocalypse

==== Armenian ====
- Nerses of Lambron (c. 1180), Commentary on the Revelation
- Gregory of Tatev (14th century)

==== Ethiopic ====
- Tergwame Qalamsis

==== Georgian ====
- Euthymius the Athonite (10th century)

==== Greek ====
- Arethas of Caesarea (c. 930)
- Neophytos of Cyprus (13th century)

==== Latin ====
- Alcuin, Explanatio Apocalypsis per interrogationem et responsionem
- Theodulf of Orléans (810), Exposition on the Apocalypse of John
- Smaragdus of Saint-Mihiel (812), Homilies on the Apocalypse
- Berengaudus (9th century), Expositio super septem visiones libri Apocalypsis
- Paschasius Radbertus (9th century)
- Helinand of Perseigne (12th century)
- Joachim of Fiore (12th century)
- Alexander Minorita (1235), Expositio in Apocalypsim
- Hugh of Saint-Cher (13th century), Exposition on the Apocalypse
- Nicholas of Gorran (13th century), On the Apocalypse of the Apostle John
- Peter of John Olivi (13th century)
- Pseudo-Albert (13th century), Expositio in Apocalypsim
- Vital du Four (13th century), Commentaries on the Apocalypse
- Nicholas of Lyra (1329)
- Austentius (14th century), fragmentary
- John Ridewall (14th century), Lectura super Apocalypsi (fragmentary)
- Heymeric de Campo (15th century)
- Giovanni Nanni (1480), Glosa siue Expositio super Apocalypsim

==== Slavonic ====
- Anonymous 10th-century commentary in the Nikol'skij Apocalypse

==== Syriac ====
- Dionysius bar Salibi (c. 1171)
- Gabriel Barclay (16th century), Metrical Exposition on the Apocalypse of John

==== Vernacular ====
- Non-Berengaudus (early 13th century; Old French)
- Federigo da Venezia (1393/4; Venetian), Literalis expositio super Apocalypsim

== See also ==
- Interpretations of the Book of Revelation
