= Paris Apocalypse =

13th-century illuminated manuscript

Woman and the dragon (fol. 19v)

The Paris Apocalypse (shelfmark Paris, Bibliothèque nationale de France, MS fr. 403) is an illuminated manuscript of the biblical Book of Revelation with commentary produced in England around 1250. The language of the text is Anglo-Norman French and the illustrations are the work of the Sarum Master. It is one of the earliest English illustrated manuscripts of Revelation in the Gothic style.

The Apocalypse measures 325 by 230 millimetres (12.8 in × 9.1 in). It contains a pictorial cycle illustrating the life of John the Divine without text on the opening and closing folios (1r–2r, 43v–44v). Revelation and the commentary are interspersed in two columns beginning on folio 2v. They are accompanied by 76 half-page miniatures on top beginning at folio 6r. The commentary text being somewhat longer, it is not complete when Revelation ends on folio 44r. It thus picks up after the final pictures of John's life on folio 45r–45v.

== Illustrations ==
Hellmouth (fol. 40r)

The miniatures were drawn in outline by a draughtsman and subsequently tined by a colourist in green, blue, ochre, red and vermilion on a plain uncoloured background. There are touches of gold. The collaboration of draughtsman and colourist probably took place in London. The artist responsible has been identified as the Sarum Master. To Suzanne Lewis, the colouring is similar to that in the Evesham Psalter and suggests the same hand.

The cycle of illustrations in the Paris Apocalypse is related to that in the Morgan Apocalypse and is thought to depend on the same prototype. Of the several manuscripts related to the Morgan, the Paris is the only one to contain a full commentary. The immediate model for the format of the Paris Apocalypse—half-page miniatures above text in two columns—is the lost Metz Apocalypse.

Revelation chapters 2–3 are unillustrated. For Revelation 6–16, the illustrations align with the text, but outside of this there is some misalignment owing to the length of the commentary compared to that of the models. In a few cases the illustrations match the commentary of Berengaudus found in the model rather than the actual commentary used. In other cases, however, the illustrations are updated to better reflect the division of the French text or more accurately reflect the text.

== Texts ==
Revelation 22:1 illustrated (fol. 42r)

According to Suzanne Lewis:

The thirteenth-century English illustrated Apocalypse was created as a book to be read. Despite their dominance in the hierarchical layout of the page, the pictures were not intended to supplant the text but were perceived as an aid to the reader's comprehension and absorption of glossed Scripture.

The language of the texts in the Paris Apocalypse is Anglo-Norman French with Francien influences. Both are in prose translated from Latin. Scholars Léopold Delisle and Paul Meyer argue that the same person translated both for the Paris Apocalypse. It is the earliest manuscript of this particular commentary, usually known as the non-Berengaudus gloss. In the Paris Apocalypse, it begins with the words "Par seint Johan sunt signifie lui bon prelatz". It is related to the Glossa Ordinaria and the Bible moralisée.

== Provenance ==
According to Lewis, the Paris Apocalypse "is one of the earliest extant examples of a long line of deluxe, custom-designed manuscripts, each uniquely responding to the exacting requirements of a particular individual." The original patrons who commissioned the work were probably Richard de Clare, 6th Earl of Gloucester, and his wife, Countess Maud de Lacy. The original intended reader was probably Maud. The manuscript probably passed to the English crown when some de Clare properties were confiscated.

An inventory compiled by Gilles Mallet in 1373 shows that the Paris Apocalypse was by then in the royal library of King Charles V of France. It was catalogued there again in 1380 by Jean Blanchet and 1411 by Antoine des Essarts. In 1424, it was catalogued when John, Duke of Bedford, bought up much of the French royal library. After John's death in 1435, it may have passed to William Cleve, who was clerk of the works under Henry VI. It was eventually acquired by Louis de Gruuthuse (died 1491), who added his coat of arms to it. Louis XII acquired it, probably before he became king of France in 1498. He overwrote Gruuthuse's arms with the royal arms. The manuscript travelled with the library until finding a permanent home in Paris in 1595, where it remains today in the collection of the Bibliothèque nationale de France.

== Works cited ==
- Becdelièvre, Véronique de (2018). "Français 403". BnF: Archives et Manuscrits.
- Dean, Ruth; Bolton, Maureen (1999). Anglo-Norman Literature: A Guide to Texts and Manuscripts. Anglo-Norman Text Society.
- Delisle, Léopold; Meyer, Paul, eds. (1901). L'Apocalypse en franrais au XIII^{e} siecle (Bibl. nat. fr. 403): Introduction et texte. Paris.
- Fox, J. C. (1912). "The Earliest French Apocalypse and Commentary". The Modern Language Review. 7 (4): 445–468. JSTOR 3713172.
- Lewis, Suzanne (1990). "The Enigma of Fr. 403 and the Compilation of a Thirteenth-Century English Illustrated Apocalypse". Gesta. 29 (1): 31–43. JSTOR 767098.
- Richards, Emerson Storm Fillman (2020). La voiz que Seint Johan oï ou ciel signefie ka grant joie de Seinte Eglise en ciel et en terre: An Analysis of the Production and Reception of the Paris Apocalypse (Paris, Bibliotheque Nationale De France, MS fr. 403) (PhD dissertations). Indiana University.
- Richards-Hoppe, Emerson Storm Fillman (2022). "Christus homo factus Wm Cleue prosperet actus: Examining a Provenance Mark with Suggestions About the Later Ownership of the Paris Apocalypse (Paris, Bibliothèque nationale de France, MS fr. 403)". Manuscript Studies. 7 (2): 361–369.
