= Lambeth Apocalypse =

English illuminated manuscript

The Lambeth hellmouth (folio 36v)

The Lambeth Apocalypse (London, Lambeth Palace Library, MS 209) is an illuminated manuscript of the Book of Revelation produced in England in the years 1260–1275 for Eleanor, Countess of Winchester. Besides Revelation, it contains commentary drawn from the work of Berengaudus. The text is all in Latin. Revelation is illustrated by 78 miniatures and is followed by 28 drawings, a sequence illustrating the life of John the Divine plus devotional images. The inclusion of these devotional images, including one depicting the Veil of Veronica, is unique among the deluxe English Apocalypse manuscripts produced around this time.

The Lambeth Apocalypse may have been produced in London or in St Albans or Canterbury. Eleanor is depicted in a donor portrait on folio 48r wearing the wimple and veil of a married woman, an undergarment bearing the arms of the Ferrers family and a cloak bearing the arms of her husband between 1252 and 1264, Roger de Quincy, Earl of Winchester. Eleanor is also depicted on folio 15v. Both times she is depicted reading.

The Lambeth Apocalypse's miniatures are at the top of the page and the text is in two columns below it. The selections from the commentary emphasise personal holiness, befitting a manuscript intended for a devout laywoman who may well have need the assistance of a chaplain to read the Latin. The text, however, might have been redundant after frequent use, with "the pictures acting as keys to unlock the memory of the beholder." The images are framed and take up about half the page. Extensive use is made of gold leaf. The 28 drawings at the end are ink wash with gold leaf. Although the Apocalypse has been likened to a picture book apocalypse, the biblical text is not abbreviated.

Nigel Morgan has published in two volumes the text of the Lambeth Apocalypse and a full-colour facsimile edition. According to Morgan, the Lambeth served as a source for the Abingdon and Gulbenkian Apocalypses.

== Bibliography ==
- Kauffmann, C. M. (1991). "An Apocalypse in Facsimile". Art History. 14 (3): 451–454. doi:10.1111/j.1467-8365.1991.tb00451.x.
- Mettler, Ruth; Morgan, Nigel J.; Brown, Michelle P.; Steenbock, Frauke (1990). Die Lambeth Palace Apokalypse. Mueller und Schindler Verlag.
- Michael, Michael (1992). "Review of Morgan 1990". The Antiquaries Journal. 72: 218–219. doi:10.1017/S0003581500071560.
- Morgan, Nigel (1990). The Lambeth Apocalypse, Manuscript 209 in Lambeth Palace Library: A Critical Study. Harvey Miller.
- Morgan, Nigel (2008). "The Lambeth Apocalypse". In Tim Ayers (ed.). The History of British Art, 600–1600. Yale University Press. pp. 166–167.
- Whatley, Laura J. (2022). "Eleanor de Quincy and Imagined Crusading in the Lambeth Apocalypse. (London, Lambeth Palace, MS 209)". In Kathryn Hurlock; Laura J. Whatley (eds.). Crusading and Ideas of the Holy Land in Medieval Britain. Brepols. pp. 171–187. doi:10.1484/M.TCNE-EB.5.129233.
