= Trinity Apocalypse =

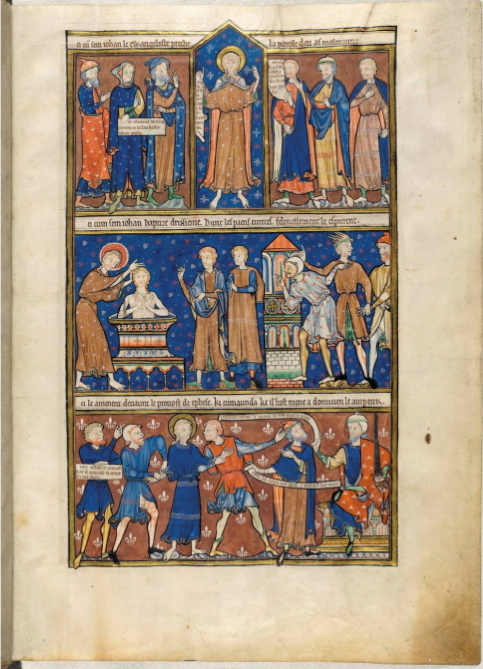
First page of the Trinity Apocalypse

The Trinity Apocalypse is an illuminated manuscript containing the Book of Revelation, a commentary on Revelation and a biographical sketch of Saint John. Produced in England around 1260, or perhaps somewhat earlier, it is now shelfmark R.16.2 at Trinity College in Cambridge, for which it is named.

The language of the text of the Trinity Apocalypse, including all its captions, is Anglo-Norman French. It is a unique translation, not attested anywhere else. The commentary is an abridged translation of the 9th-century Latin commentary by Berengaudus. This particular abridgement is not found in any other manuscript. The entire text of the manuscript is by the same scribe.

The first section of the manuscript is a series of scenes from the life of Saint John with explanatory text. Revelation and a commentary follow. The final section is another series of scenes from the life of Saint John with explanatory text. There is a total of thirty scenes from the life of John. The explanatory text consists of titles, inscriptions within the pictures and a short two-paragraph text. These texts are unique and were not copied from any known source, but the legendary life of John they portray is derived ultimately from the 2nd-century Acts of John via Pseudo-Abdias and the Legenda Aurea.

In the illustrations of Revelation, the new mendicant orders, the Franciscans and Dominicans, are represented. They were seen as the fulfillment of the Two Witnesses prophecy of chapter 11. Each of the Four Horsemen gets a miniature of its own, as does each blast of the Seven Trumpets.

The pictures on the final leaf of the manuscript are unfinished. They were executed by a different and inferior artist.

The Trinity Apocalypse is a deluxe production for a patron of high rank. Internal evidence points to a laywoman with connections to the Franciscans. M. R. James suggested Henry III's queen, Eleanor of Provence, who was in England between 1236 and 1291.

== See also ==
- English Apocalypse manuscripts

== Sources ==
- James, M. R., ed. (1909). The Trinity College Apocalypse: A Reproduction in Facsimile of the Manuscript R. 16. 2 in the Library of Trinity College, Cambridge. The Roxburghe Club.
- McKitterick, David, ed. (2005). The Trinity Apocalypse (Trinity College Cambridge, MS R.16.2). University of Toronto Press.
- O'Hear, Natasha; O'Hear, Anthony (2015). Picturing the Apocalypse: The Book of Revelation in the Arts over Two Millennia. Oxford University Press.
- Pagan, Heather (2018). "Review of Short 2016". French Studies: A Quarterly Review. 72 (1): 97. doi:10.1093/fs/knx258.
- Short, Ian, ed. (2016). Trinity Apocalypse. Anglo-Norman Text Society.
- Whatley, Laura J. (2018). "Crusading for (Heavenly) Jerusalem: A Noble Woman, Devotion, and the Trinity Apocalypse". In Elisa A. Foster; Julia Perratore; Steven Rozenski (eds.). Devotional Interaction in Medieval England and Its Afterlives. Brill. pp. 49–79.
