= Revelacion =

First page in London, British Library, Royal 2.D.xiii

Revelacion is a late 13th-century Anglo-Norman French versification of the biblical Book of Revelation. It was a popular text and is known today from ten surviving illuminated manuscripts, each containing between 76 and 106 miniature illustrations. Each manuscript also contains the text of the Latin Vulgate in parallel and several include a parallel Anglo-Norman commentary in prose, the non-Berengaudus.

Revelacion is divided into 113 episodes, although some manuscripts are incomplete. One, Cambridge, Fitzwilliam Museum, McClean 123, is heavily damaged. Revelacion's versification is irregular in both metre and rhyme. Its first editor, Paul Meyer, published only extracts in 1896 because of its lack of literary merit. He attributed its irregularity to the influence of English speech patterns. The first full critical edition was published in 1910, edited by Brent Pitts using the manuscript London, British Library, Royal 2.D.xiii as his base text. Since this manuscript does not include the commentary, it is not included with Pitts's edition. In Pitts's analysis, the metrical irregularity of Revelacion may "reflect the ascendency of the paraphraser over the poet", since the poem is a rather accurate rendering of the Vulgate.

Revelation 19:19 from Toulouse 815

The ten manuscripts of Revelacion are divided into three families, conventionally designated α, β and γ. Listed by their sigla, they are:

- α
  - B – Oxford, Bodleian, Auctarium D.4.14, folios 6r–55r
  - f – Cambridge, Fitzwilliam Museum, McClean 123, folios 66r–105r
  - P – Cambridge, Magdalene College, Pepys 1803, folios 1r–44r
  - R – London, British Library, Royal 2.D.xiii, folios 1r–51v
  - Y – Oxfordshire, Wormsley Library, folios 1r–47r
- β
  - K – Copenhagen, Kongelige Bibliothek, Thott 89, folios 1r–50r
- γ – the family with the commentary
  - A – London, British Library, Additional 18633, folios 1r–50v
  - b – Oxford, Bodleian Library, Ashmole 753, pages 1–76
  - C – Cambridge, Corpus Christi College, 20, folios 1r–60v
  - T – Toulouse, Bibliothèque municipale, 815, folios 1r–57v

== See also ==
- English Apocalypse manuscripts

== Editions ==
- Pitts, Brent A., ed. (2010). Revelacion (BL Royal 2.D.xiii). Anglo-Norman Text Society.
