= Gulbenkian Apocalypse =

13th-century illuminated manuscript

- Lisbon, Calouste Gulbenkian Museum, LA139
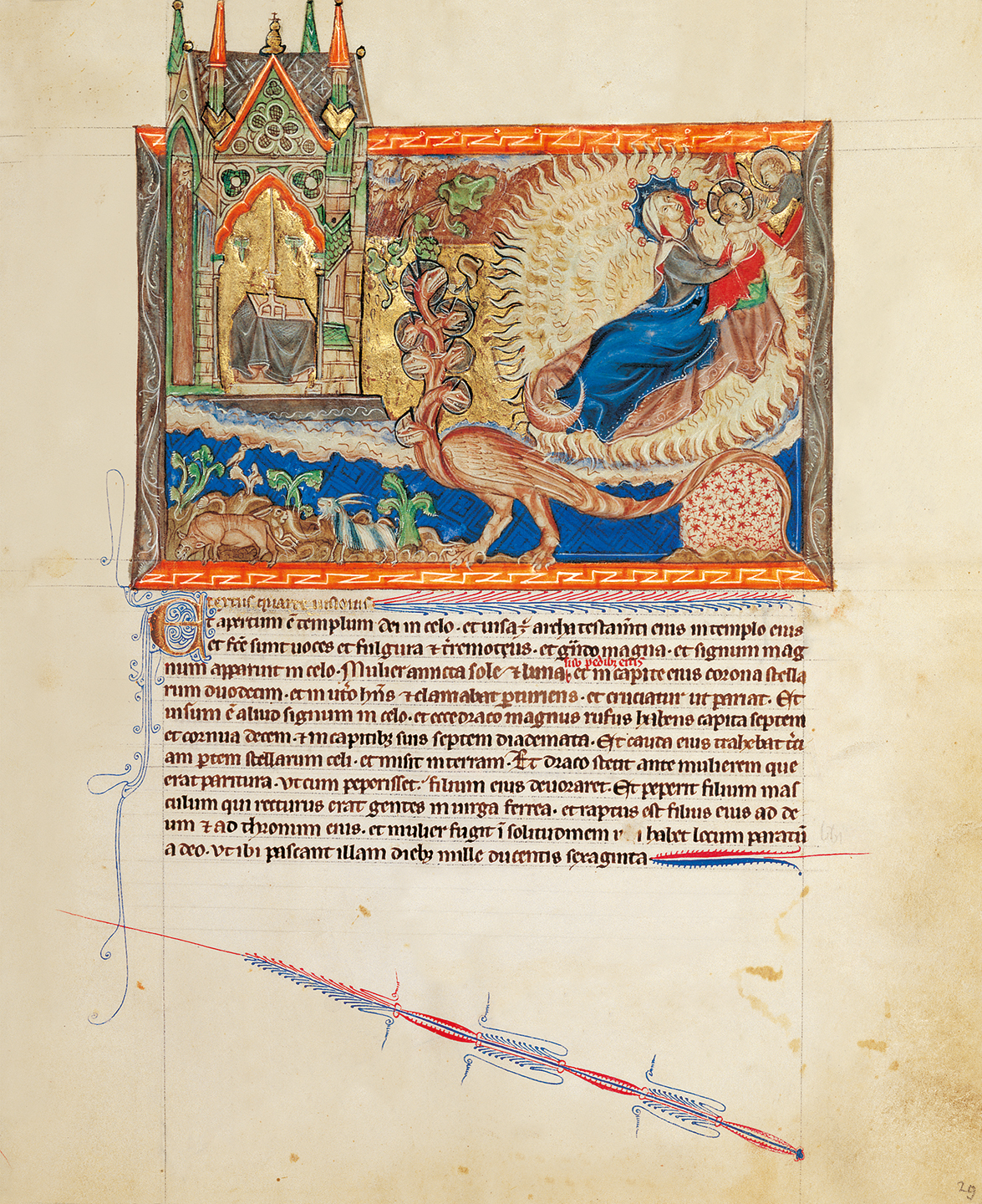
- Date: c. 1265–70
- Place of origin: England
- Language: Latin
- Size: 270 × 217 mm; 76 folios
- Contents: Book of Revelation, Berengaudus commentary
- Illumination: 153

The Gulbenkian Apocalypse is a richly illuminated thirteenth-century manuscript of the Revelation of John, now in the Calouste Gulbenkian Museum, Lisbon (LA139). It contains the Revelation text in Latin, accompanied by a theological commentary by a mediaeval exegete Berengaudus, and is illustrated with 152 painted and gilded miniatures. Although the precise place and date of production remain debated, it is usually agreed that the manuscript was produced in an English scriptorium, most likely around 1265–1270, a dating suggested by Nigel Morgan.

The manuscript belongs to a closely related group of three illustrated Apocalypses, the others now in Lambeth Palace Library (Lambeth Apocalypse, MS 209) and the British Library (Abingdon Apocalypse, Additional MS 42555), apparently produced by the same workshop of scribes and illuminators. Within this group, the Gulbenkian Apocalypse is generally regarded as the most accomplished in terms of artistic quality and richness of decoration. More broadly, it is an example of the flourishing tradition of English illustrated Apocalypses of the thirteenth century, produced during a period (c. 1250–1280) when such manuscripts enjoyed exceptional popularity as luxury books, second only to illuminated Psalters.

== Description ==
The Gulbenkian Apocalypse follows the most common English format of the period, with rectangular miniatures placed above a two-column text. The illustrations are arranged alternately above sections of the Revelation and above the corresponding theological commentary on the facing page, creating a close visual and interpretative dialogue between image and text. The commentary itself consists largely of selected extracts from the Revelation commentary attributed to Berengaudus, a work well known in England from the late eleventh century, though often radically abbreviated and shaped to guide interpretation in tandem with the manuscript images.

In this respect, the Gulbenkian Apocalypse is exceptional in that its theological commentary is fully illustrated, a feature shared only with the Abingdon Apocalypse among surviving English manuscripts of the period. These commentary images place strong emphasis on ecclesiological interpretation, depicting bishops, priests, monks, and friars in large numbers and with striking accuracy in dress and insignia. Although no record of the manuscript's commission survives, this sustained focus on the institutional Church, combined with the manuscript's learned and sumptuous presentation, suggests that it was intended for a high-ranking ecclesiastical reader, possibly a bishop or senior secular cleric.

From an artistic perspective, the Gulbenkian Apocalypse is notable for its innovative use of colour and its painterly modelling in light and shade. Its illustrations reflect the arrival of new French styles in England and the developments of contemporary Parisian illumination. Its miniatures vividly render the dramatic visions of the Revelation – angels, beasts, cosmic battles, and the ultimate triumph of good over evil – while also reflecting contemporary chivalric interests in their depiction of conflict and heroism. The manuscript is widely regarded as one of the finest surviving examples of the illustrated Apocalypse produced in thirteenth-century England.

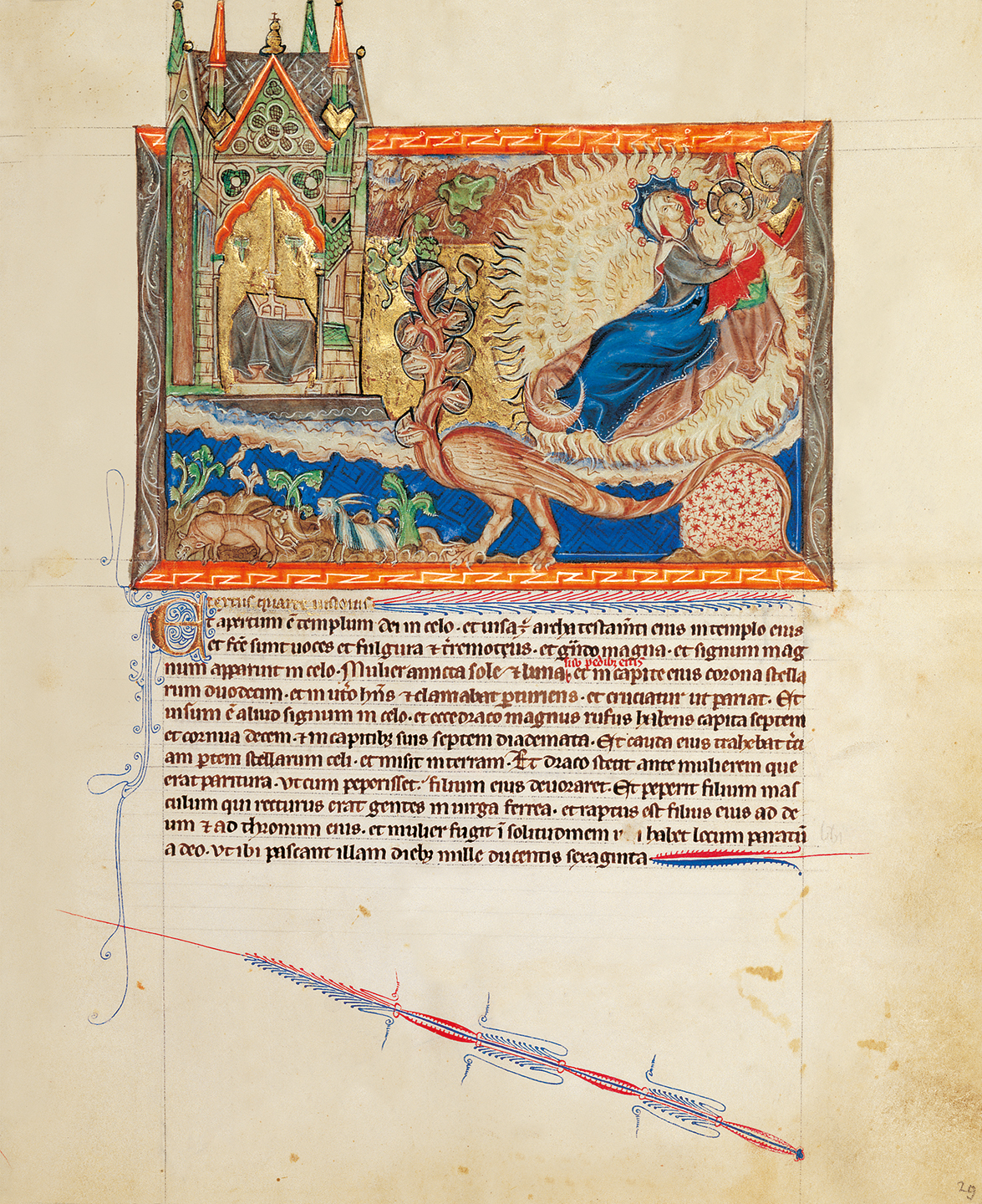
The Temple in Heaven, the Woman clothed with the Sun and the Dragon (Rev 11–12), f. 29r

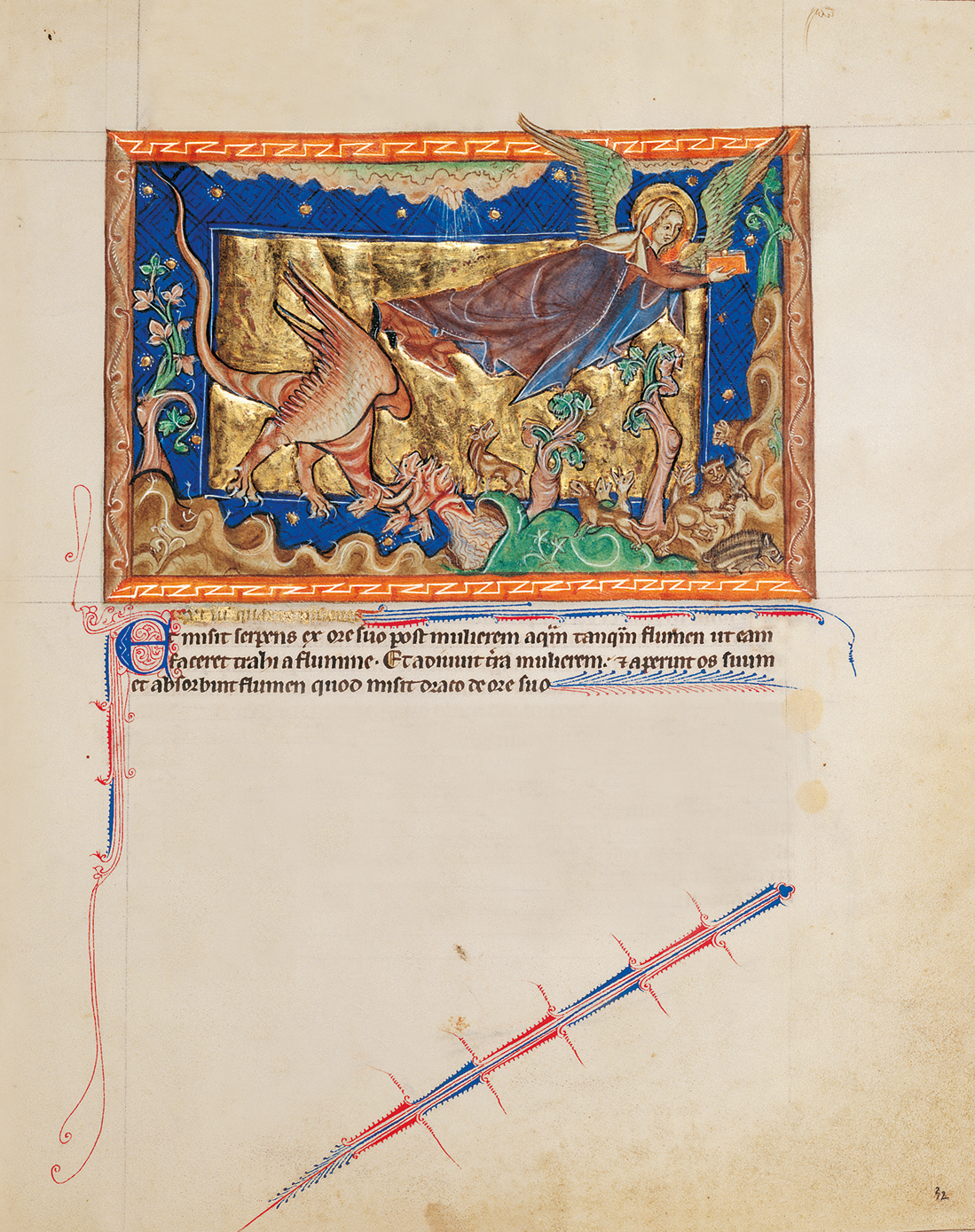
The Dragon casts out the flood at the Woman, f. 32r

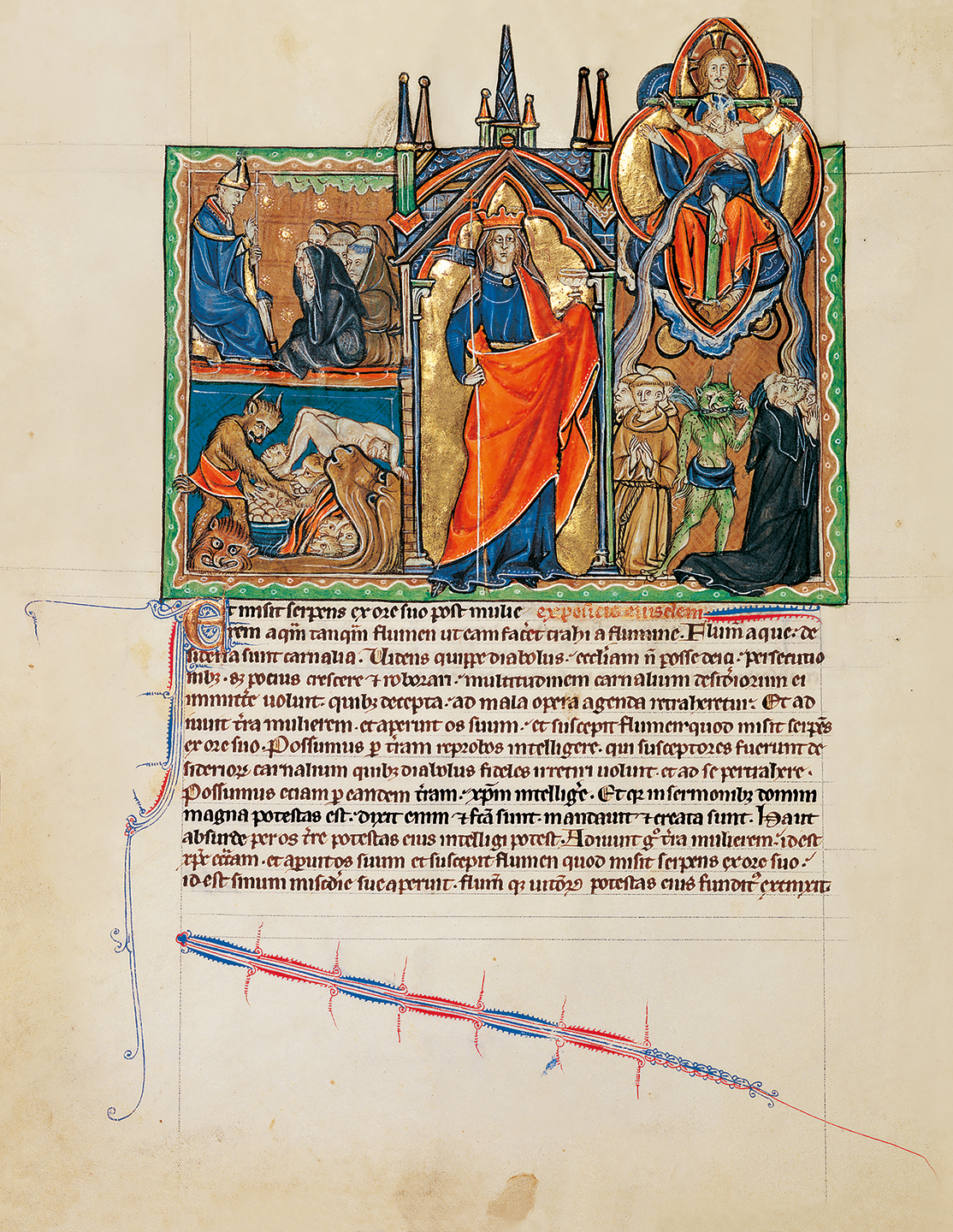
The Church triumphs over the evils of carnal desires and vices, f. 32v

== Bibliography ==
- Morgan, Nigel; Lewis, Suzanne; Nascimento, Aires; Somoano, Raquel (2019). Gulbenkian Apocalypse. Barcelona: M. Moleiro Editor. ISBN 978-84-16509-38-6.
- Morgan, Nigel (1988). Early Gothic Manuscripts (II): 1250–1285. Survey of manuscripts illuminated in the British Isles. Vol. 5. Harvey Miller. ISBN 978-0-905203-53-9.
- Emmerson, Richard Kenneth and Lewis, Suzanne (1985). "Census and Bibliography of Medieval Manuscripts Containing Apocalypse Illustrations, ca. 800–1500 (II)." Traditio, 41: 367–409. DOI: https://doi.org/10.1017/S0362152900006966.
