= English Apocalypse manuscripts =

Medieval illustrated manuscripts

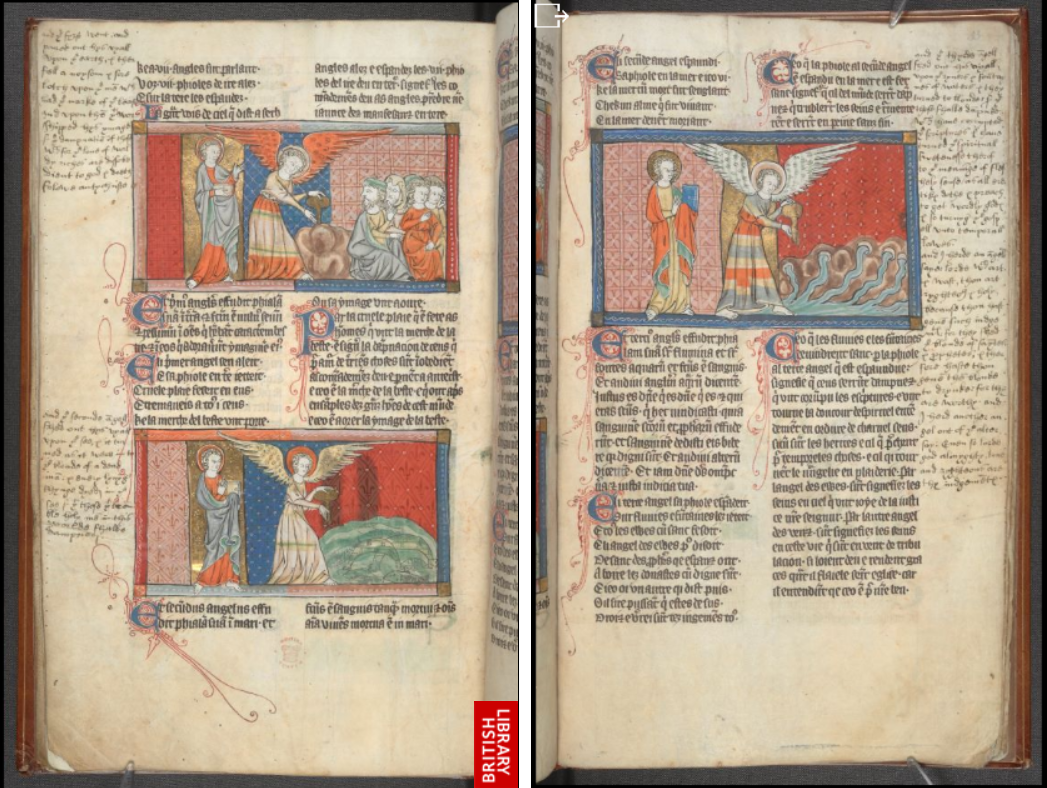
British Library Add 18633, containing the Vulgate text, Revelacion and a commentary

English Apocalypse manuscripts are illustrated manuscripts that contain the text of Revelation or a commentary on Revelation. Most of these were copied between 1250 and 1400. They include the vernacular Anglo-Norman Apocalypses.

These manuscripts can be divided by the language and form of the Apocalypse text. Many manuscripts have a Latin text, others have an Anglo-Norman prose text and others have a French verse text combined with a Latin text. Two manuscripts do not have a separate text, but incorporate excerpts from the text into the illustrations. The illustrations can be divided into several iconographic groups.

Paul Meyer and Léopold Delisle, in their book L'Apocalypse en français au XIII^{e} siècle (Paris MS fr. 403), 2 vols., Paris, 1901, were the first scholars to try to list, describe and categorize the Apocalypse manuscripts.

M. R. James also wrote about illustrated Apocalypse manuscripts in his book The Apocalypse in Art, London, 1931. Since M. R. James' work, there have been a number of more recent studies by R. Freyhan, George Henderson, Peter Klein, Suzanne Lewis, Nigel Morgan and Lucy Sandler.

== List of known English Apocalypse manuscripts ==
This is not an exhaustive list of known English Apocalypse manuscripts of the 13th and 14th centuries.

- Berlin, Kupferstichkabinet Blatt Inv. No. 1247
- Brussels, Bibliothèque Royale MS II.282
- Cambridge, Corpus Christi College MS 20: origin unknown (England or Northern France)Corpus Christi MS 20
- Cambridge, Corpus Christi College MS 394 Corpus Christi MS 394
- Cambridge, Fitzwilliam Museum MS Add. 317
- Cambridge, Fitzwilliam Museum MS McClean 123 (Nuneaton Book)
- Cambridge, Magdelene College MS F.4.5 (Crowland Apocalypse)
- Cambridge, Magdelene College MS Pepys 1803 (Pepys Apocalypse): origin unknown (England or Northern France)
- Cambridge, Trinity College MS B.10.2
- Cambridge, Trinity College MS B.10.6: origin unknown (England or Northern France)
- Cambridge, Trinity College MS R.16.2 (Trinity Apocalypse): origin unknown (England or Northern France)Trinity Apocalypse
- Cambridge, University Library MS Gg 1.1
- Copenhagen, Kongelige Bibliothek MS Thott 89.4
- Dublin, Trinity College MS 64 (Dublin Apocalypse)
- Eton College Library MS 177 (Eton Apocalypse)
- Lisbon, Gulbenkian Museum MS LA139 (Gulbenkian Apocalypse)
- London, British Library Add MS 18633 Add MS 18633
- London, British Library Add MS 35166 Add MS 35166
- London, British Library Add MS 38842 Add MS 38842
- London, British Library Add MS 42555 Abingdon Apocalypse

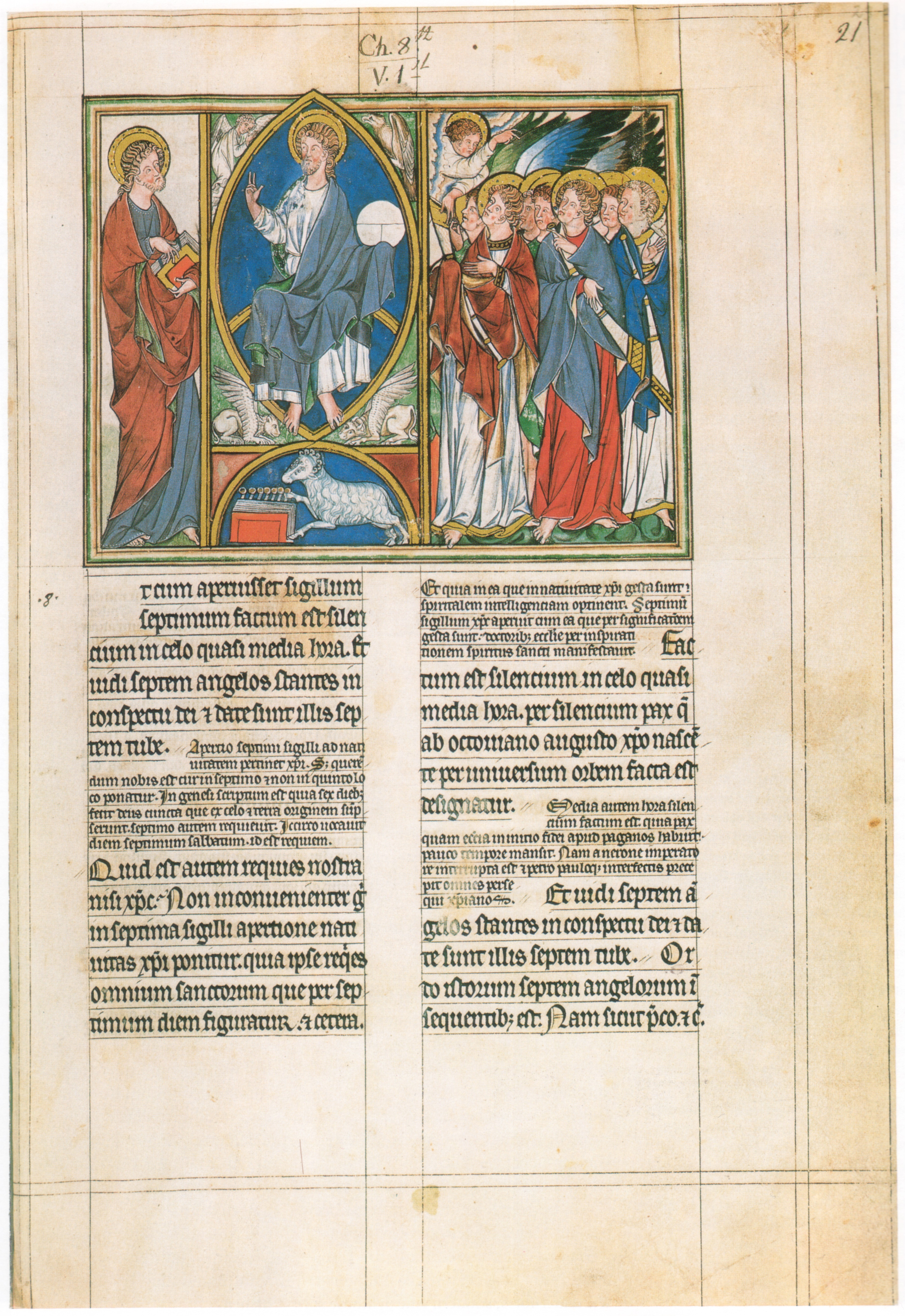
The Douce Apocalypse (21r); Oxford, Bodleian Library

- London, British Library Royal MS 15 D II The Welles Apocalypse
- London, British Library Royal MS 19 B XV Queen Mary Apocalypse
- London, British Library Royal MS 2 D XIII Royal MS 2 D XIII
- London, Lambeth Palace Library MS 209 Lambeth Apocalypse
- London, Lambeth Palace Library MS 434
- London, Lambeth Palace Library MS 75
- Los Angeles, J. Paul Getty Museum MS Ludwig III.1 Getty (Dyson Perrins) Apocalypse
- Metz, Bibliothèque Municipale MS Salis 38 (no longer extant) (Metz Apocalypse)
- Moscow, State Lenin Library MS NH.1678
- New York, Morgan Library 7 Museum MS M.524 (Morgan Apocalypse)
- New York, Public Library MS Spencer 57 (Spencer Apocalypse)
- Norwich, Central Library MS 287 (Norwich Apocalypse)
- Oxford, Bodleian Library MS Ashmole 753
- Oxford, Bodleian Library MS Auct D.4.14
- Oxford, Bodleian Library MS Auct D.4.17 (Bodleian Apocalypse)
- Oxford, Bodleian Library MS Bodley 401
- Oxford, Bodleian Library MS Canonici Bibl.62 (Canonici Apocalypse)
- Oxford, Bodleian Library MS Douce 180 Douce Apocalypse
- Oxford, Bodleian Library MS Selden Supra 38 (Selden Apocalypse)
- Oxford, Bodleian Library MS Tanner 184 (Tanner Apocalypse)
- Oxford, Lincoln College MS lat.16
- Oxford, New College MS D.65 (New College Apocalypse)
- Oxford, University College MS 100
- Paris, Bibliothèque de Arsenal MS 5214
- Paris, Bibliothèque Nationale de France MS fr.403 (Paris Apocalypse)
- Paris, Bibliothèque Nationale de France MS fr.9574
- Paris, Bibliothèque Nationale de France MS lat.10474
- Toulouse, Bibliothèque Municipale MS 815 Toulouse Apocalypse
- Yorkshire Apocalypse, private collection (Yorkshire Apocalypse)
