= Federigo da Venezia =

Illustration of Revelation 1:12–18 from MS 483 in the Museum of the Bible, a copy of Federigo's commentary from c. 1420

Federico Renoldo da Venezia (c. 1350 – c. 1401), or simply Federigo da Venezia, was an Italian Dominican theologian. He taught at the University of Padua off and on between 1389 and 1401. He was commissioned by the lord of Padua, Francesco II, to write a commentary on the Book of Revelation in the Venetian language, which he had completed by 1394. It was copied in manuscript at least sixteen times, was adapted into several other Italian vernaculars, was translated into Greek and was printed three times before the end of 1520.

== Life ==
Federigo was born around 1350 in Venice. After entering the Dominican order, he studied at the University of Bologna for a Doctor of Theology. In the Great Schism, he followed the Roman faction of Pope Urban VI and was denounced by the Avignonist chapter-general in 1386. In February 1387, he was assigned to the convent in Ferrara. In 1388, he became prior of the Dominicans of Bologna. In June 1389, he was appointed reader (lector) for two years in the University of Padua. In August, he was ordered to return the books he had borrowed from the convent in Venice or else pay for them. On 8 September 1392, he became a full professor of sacred theology at Padua.

On 20 November 1393, Federigo delivered an oration in Latin and Italian at the funeral of Francesco I da Carrara. The humanist Pier Paolo Vergerio praised his learning and eloquence on this occasion. Francesco II da Carrara commissioned him to write a vernacular commentary on the Book of Revelation, which he completed in 1393 or 1394. On 28 May 1396, he was reassigned by the Dominican master general to Bologna to serve as inquisitor. He had returned to Padua by February 1398. In 1401, he was elected prior provincial of Lower Lombardy. In February 1401, Pope Boniface IX authorized him to accept on behalf of the order the church of San Pietro Martire in Rimini. This is the latest record in which he appears.

== Works ==
Another illustration of Revelation 1:12–18 by a Cretan painter in Walters Art Museum, W.335

Federigo is known for his Literalis expositio super Apocalypsim, a commentary on the Latin Vulgate text of the Book of Revelation written in vernacular Venetian at the request of Francesco II. The commentary consists of the Latin text, followed by a Venetian translation and a literal interpretation of the meaning of the text. It was designed for the reading public and not for an academic audience. Among the few authorities it cites are Augustine of Hippo, Boethius and Bernard of Clairvaux. He also incorporates translated passages from Hugh of Saint-Cher and the anonymous Pseudo-Albertan commentary Expositio in Apocalypsim.

Federigo asserts that Revelation is the only book in the Bible of which Jesus is the author, John of Patmos being merely the scribe. The Literalis expositio belongs to a conservative and pious tradition, as opposed to the new humanistic and classicizing approach favoured, for example, by John Ridewall's Lectura super Apocalypsim. It does not make reference to contemporary events save one—John Wyclif's supposedly being struck dumb in the pulpit on account of his heresise.

The Literalis expositio is the earliest vernacular Italian biblical commentary, having appeared shortly before Rinieri dei Rinaldeschi da Prato's commentary on the Psalms of 1397. It was a popular text in the 15th century, but was often Tuscanized as it was copied. There are at least fifteen surviving manuscripts, plus one lost to fire. One copy is in Central Italian dialect of Perugia. The first published edition, an incunabulum of 1470 from Rome, is in another Central Italian dialect. Two different Tuscanized versions appeared in print at Venice in 1515 and at Milan in 1520. The incunabulum and several manuscripts misattribute the work to Nicholas of Lyra or else make Federigo a mere translator of Nicholas.

A Greek translation of the commentary was made on Crete in the early 15th century, with the biblical text being taken from the Greek Revelation (rather than back-translated). It is known from a single manuscript.

== Bibliography ==
- Cinelli, Luciano (2016). "Renoldo, Federico, da Venezia". Dizionario Biografico degli Italiani (in Italian). Vol. 86: Querenghi–Rensi. Rome: Istituto dell'Enciclopedia Italiana. ISBN 978-88-12-00032-6.
- Luttrell, Anthony (1964–1965). "Federigo da Venezia's Commentary on the Apocalypse: 1393/94". The Journal of the Walters Art Gallery. 27–28: 57–65. JSTOR 20168899.
