= Douce Apocalypse =

Illuminated manuscript

- The Bodleian Library
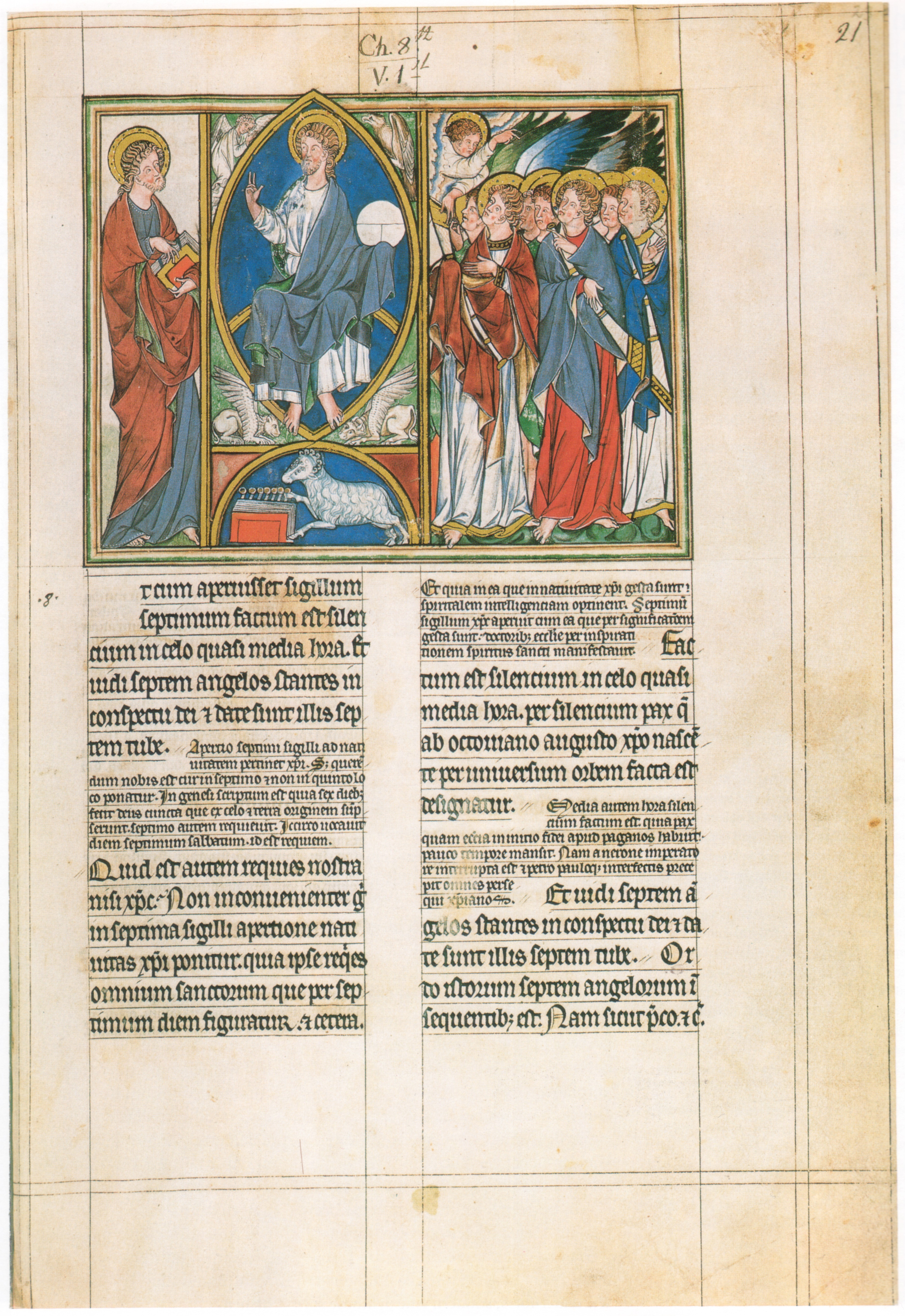
- Date: 1354 X 1372
- Place of origin: England
- Language(s): Old French and Latin
- Patron: Edward I of England and Eleanor of Castile
- Material: Parchment
- Size: 31.1 centimetres (12.2 in) x 20.3 centimetres (8.0 in)
- Contents: Book of Revelation and commentary
- Accession: Douce 180

The Douce Apocalypse is an illuminated manuscript of the Book of Revelation, dating from the third quarter of the 13th century, preserved in the Bodleian Library under the reference Douce 180. The manuscript contains 97 miniatures. It has been called "one of the glories of English thirteenth-century painting".

== History ==
The manuscript contains in its first historiated initial two characters, a knight and a lady kneeling in prayer before the Trinity and bearing the arms of two sponsors of the manuscript: Edward, Prince of Wales and future Edward I of England, and his wife, Eleanor of Castile. The work was carried out in successive stages between 1254, the date of their marriage, and 1272, when the prince acceded to the throne. On stylistic and other grounds a more precise date of between 1265 and 1270 has been proposed. The manuscript was made in Westminster, or perhaps Canterbury. No later owner is identified until the 19th century, when it was put up for sale at Christie's by William Wilson in 1833. It was acquired the same year by Francis Douce, who left his collection to the Bodleian Library at the University of Oxford on his death in 1834.

== Description ==
The manuscript is composed of two parts. The first (ff. 1–12) contains an incomplete text of the Book of Revelation in Old French, including anonymous comments without miniatures and a large historiated initial at the beginning. The second (ff. 13^{r}–61^{r}) contains the same text in Latin with comments taken from those traditionally attributed to Berengaudus. This second part contains 97 miniatures, each occupying half a page. It remains unfinished, with some of the miniatures still in draft form. The style of the miniatures is directly inspired by that current at the time of Saint Louis in Paris. It may have been made in the same workshop as the manuscript of the Apocalypse of the Bibliothèque nationale de France MS Lat. 10474. Three slightly different styles are distinguishable, suggesting that three artists may have been responsible. The binding of the manuscript, dating from the 1580s, is of gold-stamped leather over pasteboard.
