= Arethas of Caesarea =

Byzantine theologian (860–939)

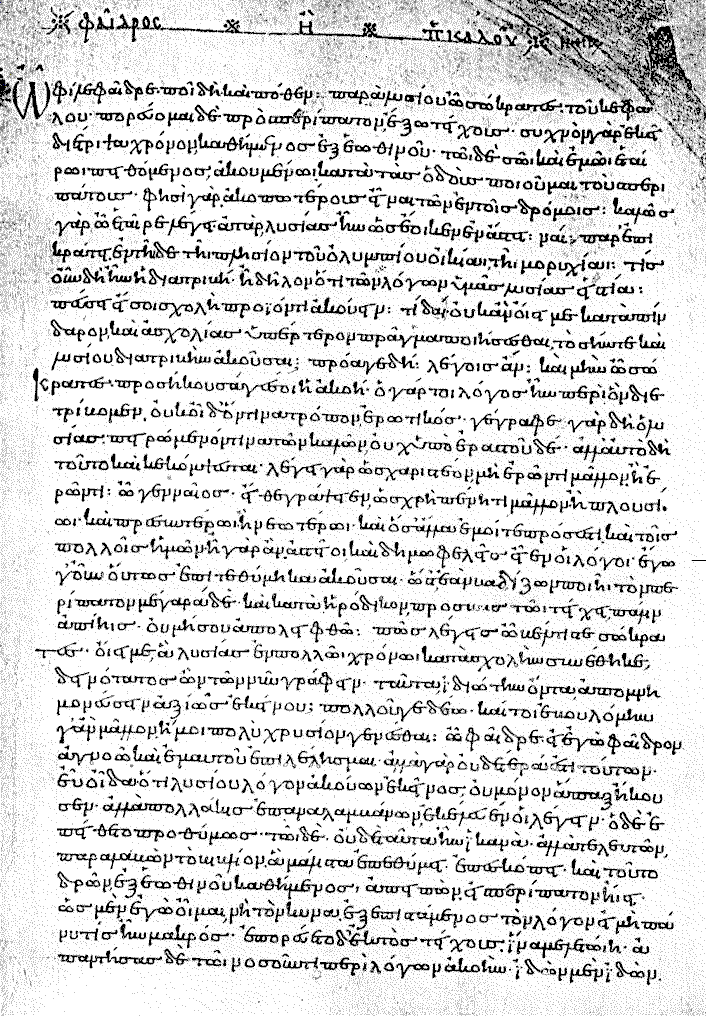
- A portion of Plato's Phaedrus from the Codex Clarkianus believed to have been commissioned by Arethas of Caesarea (from the Bodleian Library Collection)
- Born: c. 860 AD; Patrae
- Died: c. 939 AD

Philosophical work
- Era: Middle Ages
- Region: Byzantine philosophy
- School: Macedonian Renaissance
- Main interests: Patristic theology; Christian eschatology; Christian theology; Stoicism; Greek commentaries; the reproduction and preservation of ancient texts

Arethas of Caesarea (Greek: Ἀρέθας; c. 860 - c. 939) was Archbishop of Caesarea Mazaca in Cappadocia (modern Kayseri, Turkey) early in the 10th century, and is considered one of the most scholarly theologians of the Greek Orthodox Church. The codices produced by him, containing his commentaries are credited with preserving many ancient texts, including those of Plato and Marcus Aurelius' "Meditations".

== Life ==
He was born in Patras (modern-day Greece). He was a disciple of Photius and studied at the University of Constantinople. He became Deacon of Patras around 900 and was made Archbishop of Caesarea by Nikolas of Constantinople in 903. He was deeply involved in court politics and was a principal actor in the controversy over the scandal created when Emperor Leo VI attempted to marry a fourth time after his first three wives had died and left him without an heir. Despite Arethas' fame as a scholar, 20th-century Byzantine scholar Romilly Jenkins thought little of him as a person. When recounting the details of the scandal, Jenkins described Arethas as "...narrow-minded, bad-hearted... morbidly ambitious and absolutely unscrupulous..."

== Works ==
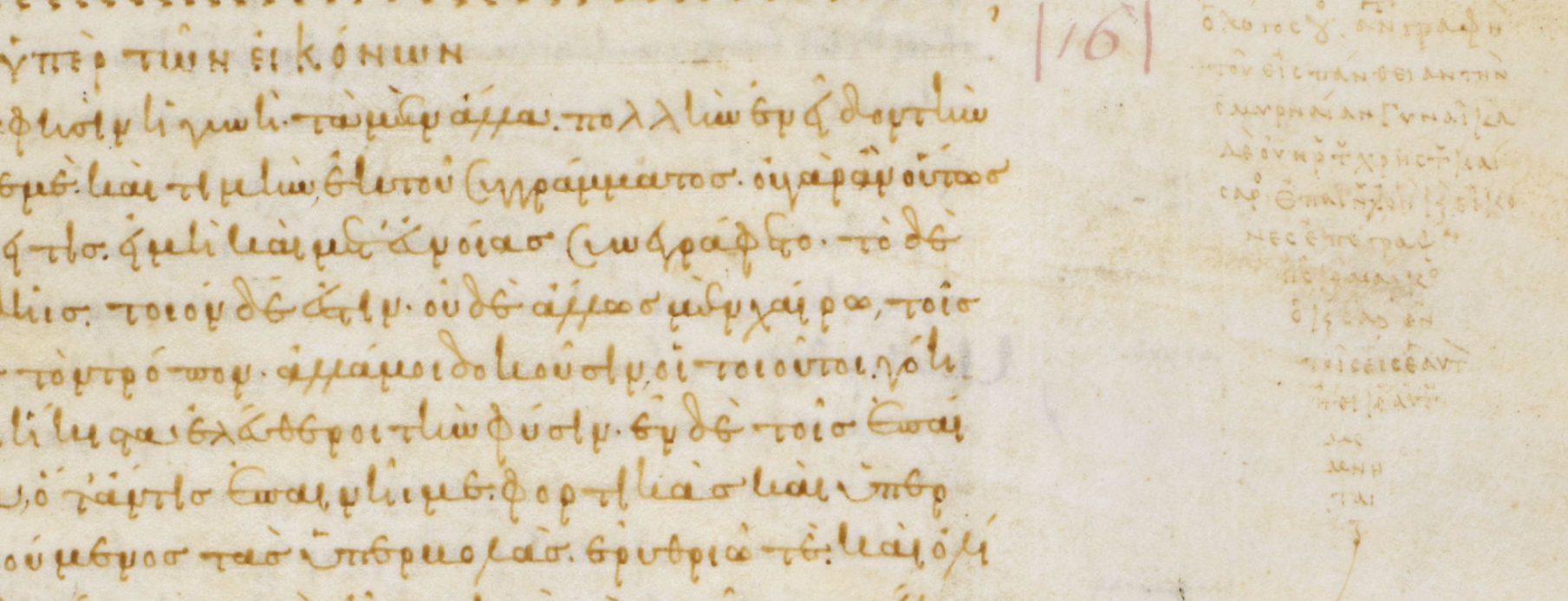
Arethas' comment on Lucian of Samosata from Harley MS 5694, mentioning the Meditations by Marcus Aurelius. His are the earliest direct references to the work.

He was the compiler of a Greek commentary (scholia) on the Apocalypse, for which he made considerable use of the similar work of his predecessor, Andrew of Caesarea. Albert Ehrhard inclines to the opinion that he wrote other scriptural commentaries.

His Arethas Codex is a significant source for the texts of almost all of the ante-Nicene Greek Christian apologists. This manuscript was copied by several Italian scribes in the 11th to 14th centuries and eventually taken to Paris, probably acquired in the time of François I. It was assigned number 2271 in the inventory of 1682 and Parisinus graecus 451 in the current numbering. It was first printed in Verona in 1532 as an appendix to the Pseudo-Oecumenian catena. The Stromata manuscript in Florence is also believed to derive from Arethas.

He is also known as a commentator of Plato and Lucian; the famous manuscript of Plato (Codex Oxoniensis Clarkianus 39), taken from Patmos to London, was copied by order of Arethas. Other important Greek manuscripts, e.g. of Euclid, the rhetor Aelius Aristides, and perhaps of Dio Chrysostom, are owed to him. Karl Krumbacher emphasises his fondness for ancient classical Greek literature and the original sources of Christian theology.

Arethas' works also contain the oldest known references to the Meditations (written c. 175 AD) by the Roman emperor Marcus Aurelius. Arethas admits to holding the work in high regard in letters to the Byzantine emperor Leo VI the Wise and in his comments to Lucian and Dio Chrysostom'. Arethas is credited with reintroducing the Meditations to public discourse.

Up through the 19th century, scholars believed there to be an earlier Arethas, also an archbishop of Caesarea, who had authored the works on the Apocalypse, around the year 540. Modern scholars believe this to be incorrect, and there to have been only one Arethas.
