= Oecumenius =

10th century Bishop of Trikka, Thessaly

Oecumenius (Greek: Οἰκουμένιος) is the name under which are transmitted several commentaries in Greek on the New Testament. It now appears that these were not all written by the same person nor in the same period.

Oecumenius was once believed to have been a bishop of Trikka (now Trikala) in Thessaly writing about 990. Scholars have, however, redated his Commentary on the Apocalypse to the early seventh or late sixth century, and have located its author in Asia Minor. The name Pseudo-Oecumenius is sometimes used in light of the uncertainty. Whether this is the "Count Oecumenius" to whom Severus of Antioch, 6th century Monophysite Patriarch, directed two letters is uncertain.

== Writings ==
Manuscripts of the eleventh century contain commentaries on the Acts of the Apostles and on the Catholic and Pauline epistles, attributed since the sixteenth century to Oecumenius. Those on the Acts and Catholic Epistles are identical with the commentaries of Theophylact of Bulgaria (eleventh century); the Pauline commentaries are a different work, though they too contain many parallel passages to Theophylact. The first manuscripts, however, are older than Theophylact, so that it cannot be merely a false attribution of his work. It would seem then that Oecumenius copied Andrew of Caesarea and was himself copied by Theophylactus. The situation is still complicated by the fact that among the authors quoted in these works the name of Oecumenius himself occurs repeatedly. The question then of Oecumenius's authorship is in all cases very difficult. Otto Bardenhewer (Kirchenlexikon, IX, 1905, coll. 706–10) is doubtful about it; Ehrhard (in Krumbacher's "Byzantin. Litter.", 132) says: "The name Oecumenius represents in the present state of investigation a riddle that can be solved only by thorough critical study of the manuscripts in connexion with the whole question of the Catenae."

The commentary on St. Paul's Epistles is a compromise between the usual kind of commentary and a catena. Most explanations are given without reference and are therefore presumably those of the author; but there are also long excerpts from earlier writers, Clement of Alexandria, Eusebius, John Chrysostom, Cyril of Alexandria etc., especially from Photius. It is among these that Oecumenius himself is quoted.

The Commentary on the Apocalypse was first edited by John Antony Cramer: "Catenae in Novum Testamentum", VIII (Oxford, 1840), 497–582; the other three (on Acts, Cath. Ep., and St. Paul) by Donatus (Verona, 1532). Morellus (Paris, 1631) re-edited these with a Latin translation; his edition is reproduced in Patrologia Graeca, vol. CXVIII-CIX. All these were based on manuscripts which were incomplete.

The most recent edition was published by Marc De Groote in 1999 (in: Traditio exegetica graeca 8, Leuven).

== Theology ==
=== Impeccability of Mary ===
Oecumenius is known to have been an early proponent of the sinlessness of the Virgin Mary:

He calls the mother of God a "cloud" on whom he rode, honoring her who is his mother according to the flesh. For, indeed, Isaiah foresaw her in this manner, saying, "Behold, the Lord is seated on a swift cloud, and he will come to Egypt, and the idols of Egypt will tremble at his presence." Interpreting this saying, Aquila says that the cloud is a "light material." "Material," as I think, because she was a human being and flesh, and "light" because of her purity and blamelessness and because not even one sin weighed her down, yet also because of the excellence and heavenward character of her soul.

— Commentary on the Apocalypse 14.14-16

=== Omnipresence of Christ's flesh ===
Oecumenius is attributed with teaching that Christ filled all things according to His flesh:

For, indeed, He long ago filled all things with His bare divinity; and having become incarnate, that He might fill all things with His flesh, He descended and ascended.

— Commentary on Ephesus 4:10

== Writings ==
- H.C. Hoskier The complete commentary of Oecumenius on the Apocalypse: Now printed for the first time from manuscripts at Messina, Rome, Salonika, and Athos, (University of Michigan studies. Humanistic series), University of Michigan (1928)
- Oecumenii commentarius in Apocalypsin, Oecumenius, Marc De Groote, Lovanii : Peeters, 1999. ISBN 90-429-0236-1 ISBN 9789042902367
- Commentary on the Apocalypse (Fathers of the Church), 2006, Oecumenius, John N. Suggit, tr., Catholic University of America Press, ISBN 0-8132-0112-8 ISBN 9780813201122. Review by Marc De Groote, Byzantion 78 (2008), 488–498.
