= Apringius =

Sixth-century Portuguese bishop

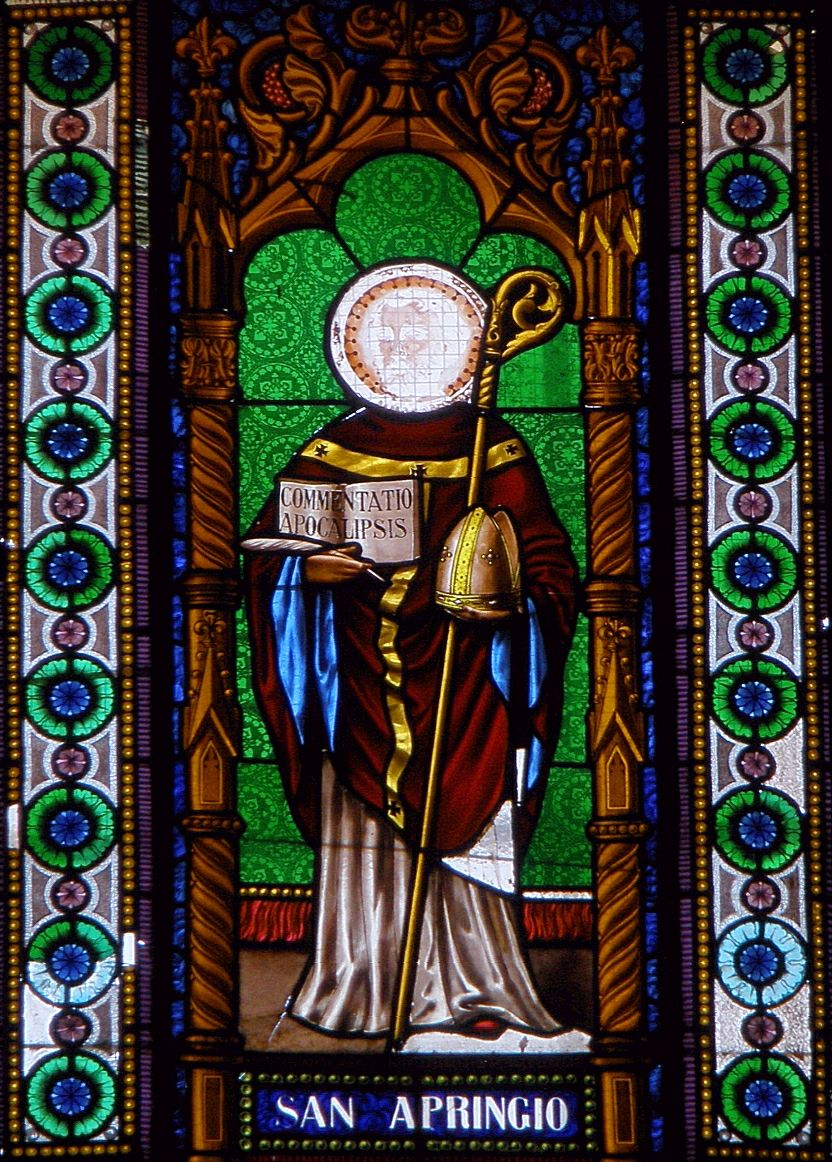
Badajoz - Cathedral of San Juan Bautista, stained glass

Apringius of Beja was a sixth-century Latin Church Father who wrote a commentary on the Book of Revelation. Only fragments of his commentary survive.

== See also ==
- List of Church Fathers
