= Primasius of Hadrumetum =

Bishop of Hadrumetum (6th century)

Primasius (fl. 551 - died c. 560) was bishop of Hadrumetum and primate of Byzacena, in Africa. One of the participants in the Three Chapters Controversy, his commentary on the Book of Revelation is of interest to modern scholars for its use of the lost commentary of Ticonius on the same book of the New Testament. According to M.L.W. Laistner, his disciples included the African theologian Junillus.

== Life ==
Of his early life nothing seems to be known, but in 551, after he had become a bishop, he was called with other bishops to Constantinople and took part in the Three Chapters Controversy. He shared the fortunes of Pope Vigilius and helped to condemn Theodorus Ascidas, bishop of Caesarea, the chief promoter of the controversy, and fled with Vigilius to Chalcedon. He declined to attend the Fifth Ecumenical Council at Constantinople in the absence of the pope, and was the sole African to sign the papal constitutum to Emperor Justinian.

== Works ==
While at Constantinople, Primasius studied the exegesis of the Greeks, and his fame is chiefly due to his commentary on Revelation. This work, divided into five books, is of importance both as a witness of the pre-Cyprian Latin text of the Book of Revelation used by the North African church, and as aiding in the reconstruction of the most influential Latin commentary on Revelation, the exegetical work of the Donatist Ticonius. The text and exegesis of Revelation 20:1-21:6 are taken without attribution from Augustine of Hippo's De civitate Dei, 20.7-17.

The work of Ticonius was considered by Primasius a piece of treasure adrift and belonging of right to the Church, needing only to be revised and expurgated. Ticonius had developed the theory introduced by Victorinus, to examine the different words and imagery used in different passages to convey the same message. Primasius followed this exegetical method very closely, but differed from Ticonius on the greater message of the text. Where Ticonius believed Revelation should be read in terms of the struggle of the Donatists with false brethren and gentiles, Primasius held the conflict properly lay between the Church and the world.

Of special interest is a letter of Augustine to the physician Maximus of Thenae preserved by Primasius, in which the four philosophical cardinal virtues are combined with the later three so-called theological virtues, making the number seven, in a manner nowhere else known of Augustine.

The first edition of Primasius's commentary was by Eucharius Cervicornus (Cologne, 1535; reprinted, Paris, 1544), but the most complete and still the most valuable is that of Basel, 1544, which is based on a very ancient manuscript of the Benedictine Monastery of Murbach in Upper Alsace. The same monastery, according to a manuscript catalogue, possessed a work Contra haereticos, which is no longer extant, and alludes to other works, especially one on Jeroboam. The commentary on the Pauline epistles and on Hebrews ascribed to Primasius by Migne is spurious.
