= Berengaudus =

Benedictine monk

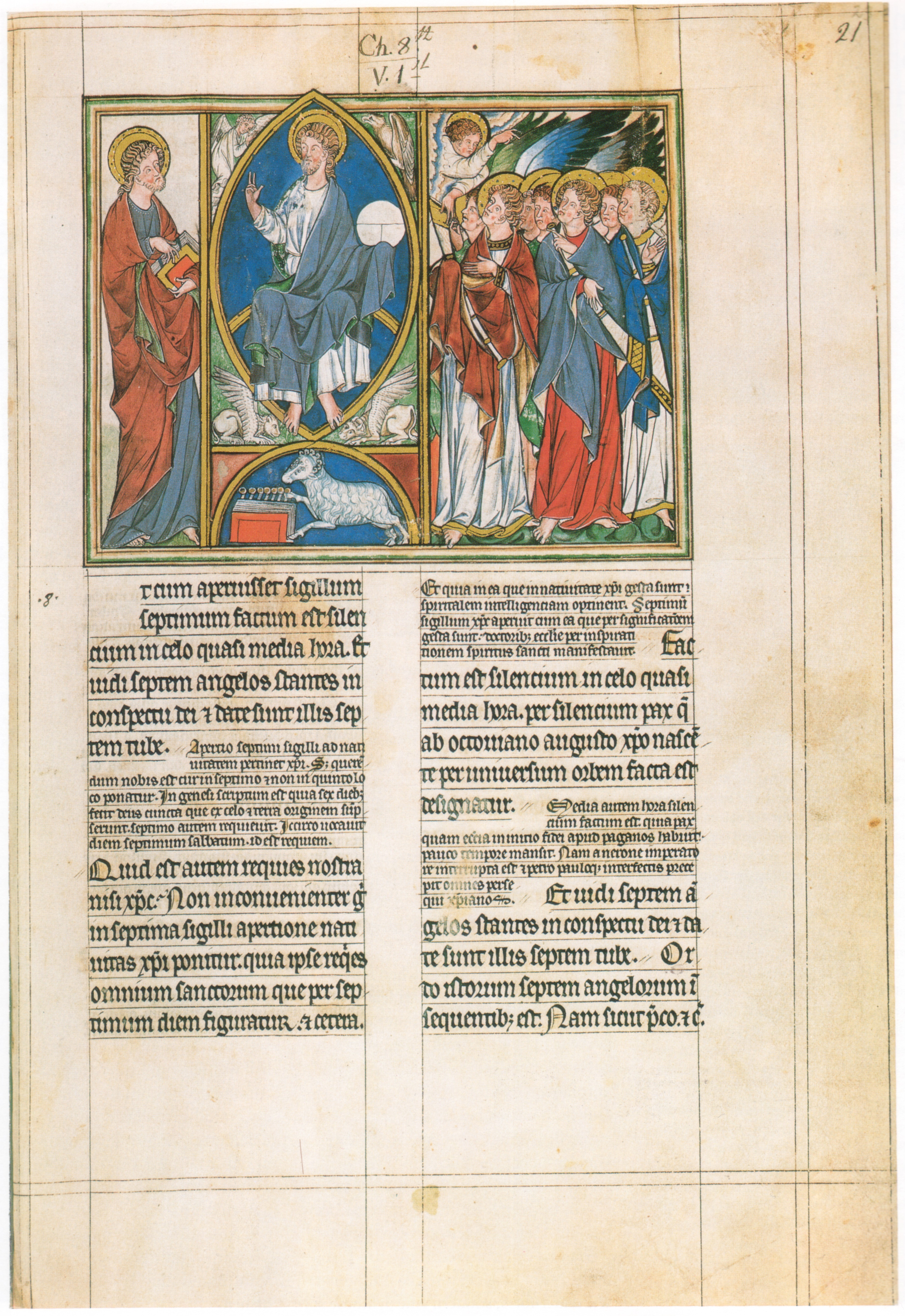
In this page from the Douce Apocalypse, c. 1270, the small writing translates (into French) text from the Berengaudus commentary, to go with the Latin text

Berengaudus (840–892) was a Benedictine monk, supposed author of Expositio super septem visiones libri Apocalypsis, a Latin commentary on the Book of Revelation. He has traditionally been assumed to be a monk of Ferrières Abbey, at the time of Lupus Servatus. The attribution has been questioned, but the Expositio was later (by the 12th century) much circulated in manuscript. It was printed in Patrologia Latina vol. XVII under Ambrose, following an attribution by Cuthbert Tunstall.

== Date of the Expositio ==
It has been argued that the Expositio's date cannot now be definitely given, but that it is closer to the 12th century than the 9th century. It has also been said that "Berengaudus" was a contemporary of Anselm of Laon; and that he was somewhat earlier, c. 1040. But Visser argues from familiarity with the commentary of Haimo of Auxerre, and internal evidence of an acrostic, that the traditional identification is valid.
