= List of illuminated manuscripts =

Prayer books, psalters and illustrated bibles

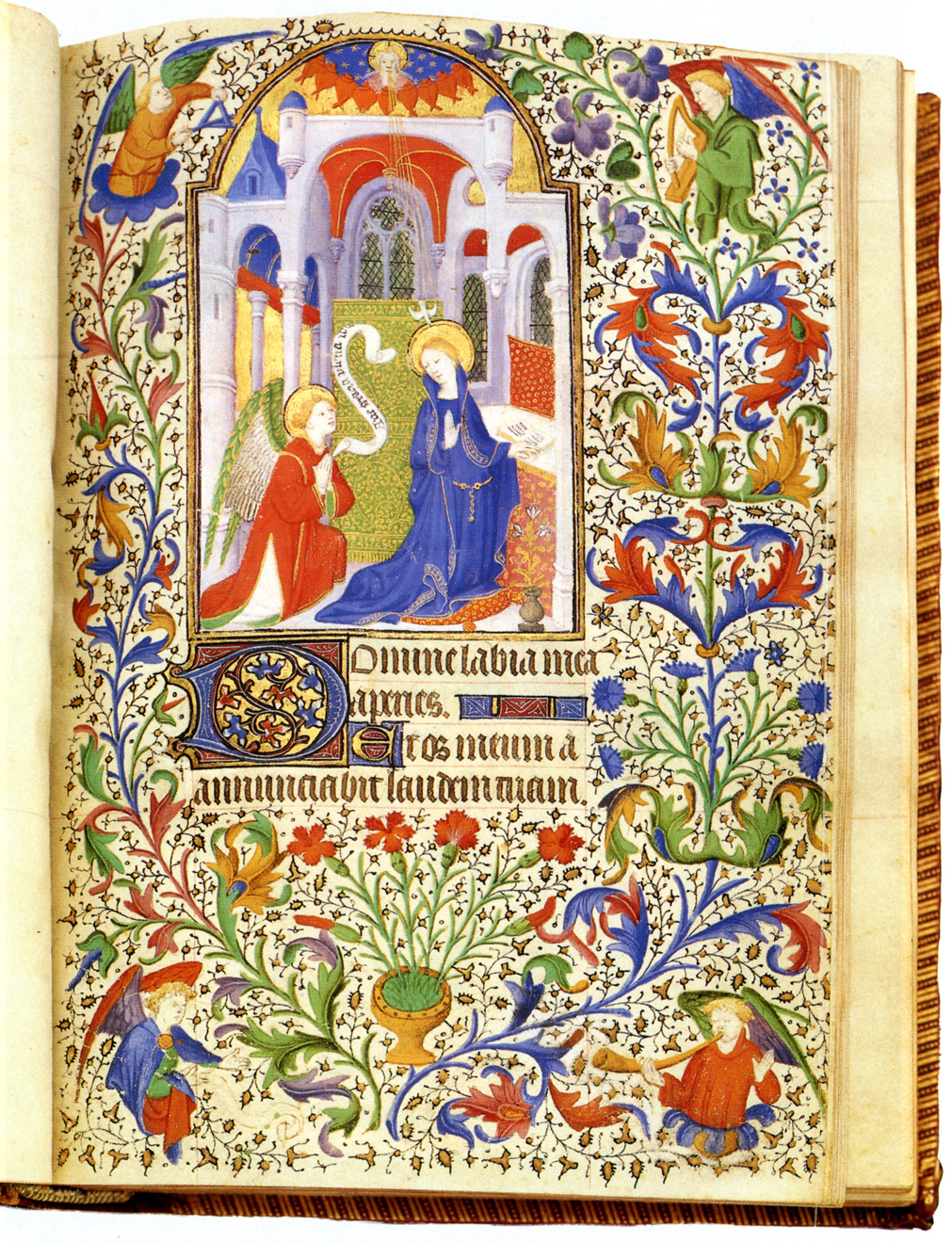
Book of hours, Paris c. 1410. Miniature of the Annunciation, with the start of Matins in the Little Office, the beginning of the texts after the calendar in the usual arrangement.

This is a list of illuminated manuscripts.

== 2nd century ==
- Paris, Bibliothèque nationale, cod. suppl. gr. 1294 (Romance Papyrus)

== 3rd century ==
- Oxford, Sackler Library, Oxyrhynchus Pap. 2331 (Heracles Papyrus)
- British Library, Papyrus 3053 (=Oxyrhynchus Papyrus 2470), possibly from as late as the 6th century

== 4th century ==
- Berlin, Staatsbibliothek Preußischer Kulturbesitz, Cod. lat. fol. 416, and Vatican City, Biblioteca Apostolica, Cod. Vat. lat. 3256 (Vergilius Augusteus)
- No longer extant (Calendar of Filocalus)

== 5th century ==
=== Biblical Texts ===
- Berlin, Staatsbibliothek Preußischer Kulturbesitz, Cod. theol. lat. fol. 485 (Quedlinburg Itala fragment)
- London, British Library, Royal MS 1. D. V-VIII (Codex Alexandrinus)
- Naples, Biblioteca Vittorio Emanuele III, 1 B 18 (Old Testament fragment)
- Garima Gospel 2

=== Virgil ===
- Vatican City, Biblioteca Apostolica, Cod. Vat. lat. 3225 (Vergilius Vaticanus)
- Vatican City, Biblioteca Apostolica, Cod. Vat. lat. 3867 (Vergilius Romanus)

=== Homer ===
- Milan, Biblioteca Ambrosiana, Cod. F. 205 Inf. (Ambrosian Iliad)

=== Herbal ===
- London, Wellcome Library, MS 5753, Johnson Papyrus

=== Unknown ===
- London, Egypt Exploration Society, s.n. (Charioteer Papyrus)

== 6th century ==
=== Gospel Books ===
- Brescia, Biblioteca Civica Queriniana, s.n. (Codex Brixianus)
- Cambridge, Corpus Christi College, MS 286 (St. Augustine Gospels)
- Florence, Biblioteca Mediceo Lauenziana, MS Plut. I, 56 (Rabula Gospels)
- Fulda monastery, Landesbibliothek, Cod. Bonifatianus 1 (Codex Fuldensis)
- London, British Library, Harley MS 1775 (6th century Italian Vulgate Gospel Book)
- Paris, Bibliothèque nationale, MS gr. 1286 (Sinope Gospels)
- Rossano, Cathedral, Archiepiscopal Treasury, s. n. (Rossano Gospels)
- Uppsala, Uppsala University Library (Codex Argenteus)
- Würzburg, Universitätsbibliothek, Cod. M. p. th. F. 68 (Burchard Gospels)

=== Genesis ===
- London, British Library, MS Cotton Otho B. VI (Cotton Genesis)
- Vienna, Österreichische Nationalbibliothek, Cod. theol. gr. 31 (Vienna Genesis)

=== Bible ===
- Durham, Cathedral Library, MS B. IV. 6 (Bible fragment)

=== Pentateuch ===
- Paris, Bibliothèque nationale, MS nouv. acq. lat. 2334 (Ashburnham Pentateuch).

=== Dioscurides ===
- Vienna, Osterreichische Nationalbibliothek, Cod. med. gr. 1. (Vienna Dioscurides)

=== Corpus Agrimensorum Romanorum ===
- Wolfenbüttel, Herzog August Bibliothek, Cod. Guelff. 36.23 Augusteus 2 (Corpus Agrimensorum Romanorum)

=== Detached Lists ===
- Yerevan, Matenadaran, M2374 (four lists of the Echmiadzin Gospel )

== 7th century ==
=== Mushaf ===
- Great Umayyad Qur'an

=== Gospel Books ===
- Dublin, Trinity College Library, MS 55 (Codex Usserianus Primus (Ussher Gospels))
- Dublin, Trinity College Library, MS A. 4. 5. (MS 57) (Book of Durrow)
- Durham, Cathedral Library, MSS A. II. 10 ff. 2–5, 338-8a, C. III. 13, ff. 192–5, and C. III. 20, ff. 1, 2 (Insular Gospel Book Fragment)
- Durham, Cathedral Library, MS A. II. 17, 2-102 and Cambridge, Magdalene College, Pepysian MS 2981 (19) (Durham Gospels)
- London, British Library, Add MS 5111, Canon Tables from Byzantine Gospel Book (London Canon Tables; Commons)
- Monza, Cathedral Treasury, s. n. (Gospels of Queen Theodelinda)

=== Psalters ===
- Dublin, Royal Irish Academy, s. n. (Cathach of St. Columba)

=== Bibles ===
- Florence, Biblioteca Medicea Laurenziana, MS Amiatinus 1 (Codex Amiatinus)
- Paris, Bibliothèque nationale, MS syr. 341 (Syriac Bible of Paris)

=== Orosius ===
- Milan, Biblioteca Ambrosiana, MS D. 23. sup. (Ambrosiana Orosius)

=== Jerome ===
- Milan, Biblioteca Ambrosiana, MS S. 45. sup. (Ambrosiana Jerome)

=== Miscellany ===
- Vienna, Österreichische Nationalbibliothek, Cod. lat. 847 (Rufinus of Aquileia, Treatise on the Blessings of the Patriarchs)

=== Dioscurides ===
- Naples, Biblioteca Nazionale, Cod. Gr. 1 (Naples Dioscurides)

=== Detached Leaves ===
- Paris, Bibliothèque nationale, MS lat. 12190 (Carpet Page)

=== Gregory of Tours ===
- Paris, Bibliothèque nationale, MS lat. 17655 (Gregory of Tours, Historia Francorum)

=== Gregory the Great ===
- Troyes, Bibliothèque municipale, MS 504 (Gregory the Great, Pastoral Care)

=== Origen ===
- London, British Library, Burney MS 340 (Origen, Homiliae in numeri)

== 8th century ==
=== Gospel Books ===
- Alba-Iulia, Romania, Batthyaneum Library, s.n.; Vatican library, Pal. lat. 50; Cover in London, British Library (Codex Aureus of Lorsch)
- Cambridge, Corpus Christi College, MS 197B, ff. 1-36 (Formerly pp. 245–316) and London, British Library, MS Cotton Otho C. V (Cotton-Corpus Christi Gospel Fragment)
- Dublin, Trinity College Library, MS A. I. (58) (Book of Kells)
- Dublin, Trinity College Library, MS 59 (Book of Dimma)
- Dublin, Trinity College Library, MS 60 (Book of Mulling)
- Durham, Cathedral Library, MSS A. II. 16, ff. 1-23, 34–86, 102 and Cambridge, Magdalene College Pepysian MS 2981 (18) (Insular Gospel Book Fragment)
- Freiburg im Breisgau, Universitatbibliothek, Cod. 702 (Freiburg Gospel Book Fragment)
- Gotha, Forschungsbibliothek, Cod. Memb I. 18 (Gotha Gospel Book)
- Harburg-Bayern, Schloss Harburg, Fürst, Oettingen-Wallerstein'sche Bibliothek Cod. I. 2. 4. 2 (Maihingen Gospels)
- Hereford, Cathedral Library, MS P. I. 2 (Hereford Gospels)
- Lichfield, Cathedral Library, (Lichfield Gospels (Book of St. Chad))
- London, British Library, Add MS 5463 (Codex Beneventanus)
- London, British Library, Add MS 40618 (Gospel Book)
- London, British Library, MS Cotton Nero D. IV (Lindisfarne Gospels)
- London, British Library, Royal MS 1. B. VII (Gospel Book)
- Maaseik, Church of St. Catherine, Treasury, s. n. (Maaseik Gospel Book)
- Oxford, Bodleian Library, MS Auct. D. 2. 19 (S. C. 3946) (Rushworth Gospels (MacRegol Gospels))
- Paris, Bibliothèque de l'Arsenal, MS 599 (Saint-Martin-des-Champs Gospels)
- Paris, Bibliothèque nationale, MS lat. 281, 298 (Codex Bigotianus)
- Paris, Bibliothèque nationale, MS lat. 9389 (Echternach Gospels)
- Paris, Bibliothèque nationale, MS nouv. acq. lat. 1203(Godescalc Evangelistary)
- Paris, Bibliothèque nationale, MS nouv. acq. lat. 1587 (Gospel Book of St. Gatian of Tours)
- St. Gall, Stiftsbibliothek, Cod. 51 (St. Gall Gospel Book)
- Saint Petersburg, National Library of Russia, Cod. F. v. I. 8 (Leningrad Gospels (Saint Petersburg Gospels))
- Stockholm, Royal Library, MS A. 135 (Stockholm Codex Aureus)
- Trier, Trier Cathedral Treasury, Codex 61 (Bibliotheksnummer 134) (Trier Gospels)
- Trier, Stadtbibliothek, Cod.22 (Ada Gospels)
- Turin, Biblioteca Nazionale, MS O. IV. 20 (Gospel Book fragment)
- Vatican City, Biblioteca Apostolica, MS Barberini Lat. 570 (Barberini Gospels)
- Vienna, Österreichische Nationalbibliothek, Cod. 1224 (Cuthbert Gospels)
- Vienna, Kunsthistorisches Museum, Schatzkammer, Inv. XIII 18 (Vienna Coronation Gospels)

=== Psalters ===
- Berlin, Staatsbibliothek Preußischer Kulturbesitz, MS Hamilton 553 (Salaberga Psalter)
- London, British Library, MS Cotton Vespasian A. I (Vespasian Psalter)

=== Bibles ===
- Amiens, Bibliothèque municipale, MSS 6–7,9,11-12 and Paris, Bibliothèque nationale, MS lat. 13174. (Maurdramnus Bible)
- London, British Library, Add MS 45025 and 37777 (Ceolfrid Bible)

=== Apocalypse manuscripts ===
- Trier Apocalypse (Trier, Stadtbibliothek, MS 31)

=== Boethius ===
- Bamberg, Bamberg State Library, Msc.Class.5 (Boethius, Arithmetica)

=== Isidore of Seville ===
- Basel, University Library, MS F. III.f (Isidore, De Natura Rerum)
- Brussels, Bibliothèque royale Albert 1er, MS. II. 4856 (Isidore, Etymologies)

=== Bede ===
- London, British Library, MS Cotton Tiberius A. XIV (Bede, Ecclesiastical History)
- London, British Library, MS Cotton Tiberius C. II (Bede, Ecclesiastical History)
- Saint Petersburg, Public Library, Cod. Q. v. I. 18 (Saint Petersburg Bede (Leningrad Bede))

=== Cassiodorus ===
- Durham, Cathedral Library, MS B. II. 30 (Durham Cassiodorus)

=== Miscellanies ===
- London, British Library, Add MS 43460 (Theological miscellany)

=== Pope Gregory I ===
- London, British Library, Add MS 31031 (Gregory, Moralia in Job)
- Milan, Biblioteca Ambrosiana, MS B. 159 Sup. (Gregory, Dialogues)

=== Liturgical manuscripts ===
- Paris, Bibliothèque nationale, MS lat. 9427 (Lectionary)
- Paris, Bibliothèque nationale, MS lat. 12048 (Sacramentary)

=== Hagiography ===
- Milan, Biblioteca Ambrosiana, MS F. 48 Sup. (Lives of the Saints and Their Teachings)

=== Césaire d'Arles ===
- Brussels, Bibliothèque royale Albert 1er, MSS 9850-0852 (Césaire d'Arles, Homilies and Commentary on the Gospels)

=== Collectio canonum ===
- The Hague, Musee Meermanno-Westreenianum, 10 B 4 (Collectio canonum)

=== Glossaries ===
- St. Gallen, Stiftsbibliothek, Cod. 911 (Codex Abrogans)

=== Prayer Book ===
- Verona, Verona Cathedral, Biblioteca Capit. Cod. LXXXIX (Libellus Orationum)

== 9th century ==
=== Gospel Books ===
- Aachen, Cathedral Treasury, s. n. (Aachen Gospels)
- Abbeville, Bibliothèque municipale, MS 4 (St. Riquier Gospels)
- Bern, Bergerbibliothek, Cod. 348 (Gospel Book)
- Bern, Stadtbibliothek, 671 (Cornish Gospels)
- Brescia, Biblioteca Civica Queriniana, Cod. E. II. 9 (Gospel Book)
- Brussels, Bibliothèque royale Albert 1er, MS 18.723 (Xanten Gospels)
- Dublin, Trinity College Library, MS 56 (Codex Usserianus Secundus (Garland of Howth))
- Épernay, Bibliothèque municipale de Épernay, Ms. 1 (Ebbo Gospels)
- Fulda, Landesbibliothek, Cod. Bonifatianus 3 (Cadmug Gospel Book)
- London, British Library, Add MS 11848 (Carolingian Gospel Book)
- London, British Library, Add MS 47673 (Schuttern Gospels)
- London, British Library, Egerton MS 609 (Breton Gospel Book)
- London, British Library, Egerton MS 768 (Gospel Book)
- London, British Library, Harley MS 2788 (Harley Golden Gospels)
- London, British Library, Royal MS 1 E VI, and Canterbury, Cathedral Library, Additional MS 16 (Royal Bible (Canterbury Gospel Book))
- Munich, Bayerische Staatsbibliothek, Clm 14000 (Codex Aureus of St. Emmeram)
- New York, Morgan Library & Museum, MS 1 (Lindau Gospels)
- Paris, Bibliothèque nationale, MS lat. 8850 (Gospels of St. Medard de Soissons)
- Venice, San Lorenzo, cod. 1144/86 (Gospel of Queen Mlke, 862 )
- Yerevan, Matenadaran, M6200 (Lazarian Gospel, 887)

=== Psalters ===
- London, British Library, Add MS 37768 (Psalter of Lothaire)
- Montpellier, Bibliothèque de l'université, 409 (Montpellier Psalter)
- Moscow, State Historical Museum, MS D. 29 (Chludov Psalter)
- Stuttgart, Wurttembergische Landesbibliothek, Cod. Bibl. 2. 12 (Stuttgart Psalter)
- Utrecht, Universiteitsbibliotheek, MS Bibl. Rhenotraiectinae I Nr 32. (Utrecht Psalter)

=== Bibles ===
- Cava de' Tirreni, Biblioteca della Badia, Ms. memb. I 303 (La Cava Bible)
- London, British Library, Add MS 10546. (Moutier-Grandval Bible)
- Paris, Bibliothèque nationale, MS lat. 1 (First Bible of Charles the Bald)
- Paris, Bibliothèque nationale, MS lat. 2 (Second Bible of Charles the Bald)
- Paris, Bibliothèque nationale, MS lat. 8847 (Bible fragment)
- Rome, St. Paul's Outside the Walls, s.n. (kept in the Vatican Library) (Bible of San Paolo fuori le Mura)

=== Job and Ezra ===
- London, British Library, Arundel MS 125 (Job and Ezra)

=== Prayerbooks ===
- Cambridge, University Library, MS L1. 1. 10 (Book of Cerne)
- London, British Library, Harley MS 2965 (Book of Nunnaminster)
- London, British Library, Royal MS 2. A. XX (Royal Prayerbook)
- London, British Library, Add MS 30852 (Mozarabic Prayerbook)

=== Liturgical Books ===
- Dublin, Royal Irish Academy, MS D. II. 3, ff. 12-67 (Stowe Missal)
- Paris, Bibliothèque nationale, MS lat. 9428 (Drogo Sacramentary)
- Paris, Bibliothèque nationale, MS lat. 9451 (Lectionary)

=== Miscellanies ===
- Dublin, Trinity College Library, MS 52 (Book of Armagh)
- London, British Library, Royal MS 5 E XIII (Miscellany)
- Lucca, Biblioteca Capitolare Feliniana, MS 490 (Miscellany)

=== Physiologus ===
- Bern, Burgerbibliothek, Codex Bongarsianus 318 (Bern Physiologus)

=== Cicero ===
- London, British Library, Add MS 47678 (Cicero, Speeches)
- London, British Library, Harley MS 647 (Cicero, Aratea)

=== Germanicus ===
- Leiden, Universiteitsbibliotheek, VLQ 79. (Germanicus, Aratea)

=== Agrimensores ===
- Vatican City, Biblioteca Apostolica, MS Palat. lat 1564 (Agrimensores)

=== Theodore of Mopsuestia ===
- Turin, Biblioteca Nazionale, MS B. 1. 2 (Theodore, Commentary on the Twelve Minor Prophets)

=== Terence ===
- Vatican City, Biblioteca Apostolica, MS Vat. lat. 3868 (Vatican Terence)

=== Beatus manuscripts ===
- Silos, Spain, Biblioteca del Monastery of Santo Domingo de Silos, frag. 4 (Silos Beatus Fragment)

=== Hrabanus Maurus ===
- Rome, Bibliotheca Vaticana, Reg. lat. 124 (Hrabanus Maurus, In Praise of the Holy Cross)

=== Canon Law ===
- London, British Library, Cotton MS Claudius B. V (Acts of the Council of Constantinople)

== 10th century ==
=== Psalters ===
- Bamberg, Bamberg State Library, Msc.Bibl.44 (Psalter)
- Cambridge, St. John's College, MS C. 9 (59) (Southampton Psalter)
- Cividale, Biblioteca Civica, MS. Sacri 6 (Egbert Psalter)
- London, British Library, Add MS 18043 (Stavelot Psalter)
- London, British Library, Add MS 37517 (Bosworth Psalter)
- London, British Library, Cotton MS Galba A XVIII (Aethelstan Psalter)
- London, British Library, Harley MS 2904 (Ramsey Psalter)
- London, British Library, Royal MS 2 B V (Psalter)
- Oxford, Bodleian Library, MS Junius 27 (Codex Vossanius)
- Paris, Bibliothèque nationale, MS gr. 139 (Paris Psalter)
- Vatican City, Biblioteca Apostolica Vaticana, Pal. Lat. 39 (Heidelberg Psalter)

=== Gospel Books ===
- Aachen, Cathedral Treasury, s. n. (Aachen Gospels of Otto III)
- Cambridge, University Library, MS II. 6. 32 (Book of Deer)
- Darmstadt, Landesbibliothek, MS 1948 (Gero Gospels)
- The Hague, Koninklijke Bibliotheek, 76 F 1 (Egmond Gospels)
- The Hague, Musee Meermanno-Westreenianum, 10 B 7 (Gospel Book)
- London, British Library, Add MS 9381 (Bodmin Gospels)
- London, British Library, Add MS 34890 (Grimbald Gospels)
- London, British Library, Add MS 37320 (Greek Gospel Book)
- London, British Library, Add MS 40000 (Gospel Book)
- London, British Library, Arundel MS 524 (Greek Gospel Book)
- London, British Library, Royal MS 1 A XVIII (Gospel Book)
- London, British Library, Stowe MS 3 (Gospel Book)
- Munich, Bayerische Staatsbibliothek, Clm 4453 (Gospels of Otto III)
- Modena, Biblioteca Estense, Gr. I (Gospel Book)
- Saint Petersburg, Russian National Library, Trapezunt Gospel
- Trier, Stadtbibliothek, Hs.24 (Codex Egberti) - UNESCO Welterbe
- Yerevan, Matenadaran, M2374 (Echmiadzin Gospel, 989 )

=== Bibles ===
- Vatican, Biblioteca Apoltolica Vaticana, Reg. gr. 1, (Leo Bible)
- León, Colegiata de San Isidoro, Cod. 2 (León Bible of 960)
- León, León Cathedral, Cod. 6 (León Bible of 920)
- Madrid, Biblioteca Nacional Cod. Vit. 13-1 (Biblia Hispalense)

=== New Testament ===
- London, British Library, Add MS 28815 and Egerton MS 3145 (Greek New Testament)

=== Book of Joshua ===
- Vatican, Biblioteca Apostolica Vaticana, Pal. gr. 431 (Joshua Roll)

=== The first book of Maccabees ===
- Leiden, Universiteitsbibliotheek, PER F 17

=== Bede ===
- Cambridge, Corpus Christi College, MS 183 (Corpus Bede)
- London, British Library, Harley MS 1117 (Bede, Lives of Cuthbert)
- Oxford, Bodleian Library, MS Tanner 10 (Tanner Bede)

=== Beatus Manuscripts ===
- Girona, Museo de la Catedral de Girona, Num. Inv. 7 (11), (Girona Beatus)
- La Seu d'Urgell, Musei Diocesá de La Seu d'Urgell, (Urgell Beatus)
- Madrid, Archivo Histórico Nacional, Cod. 1097B (Tábara Beatus)
- Madrid, Biblioteca Nacional, MS VIT. 14-1 (Vitrina 14-1 Beatus)
- Madrid, Biblioteca Nacional, MS VIT. 14–2, ff. 1-5 (Vitrina 14-2 Beatus Fragment)
- Madrid, Real Academia de la Historia, Cod. 33 (San Millán beatus)
- New York, Morgan Library & Museum, MS 644 (Morgan Beatus)
- San Lorenzo de El Escorial, Escorial, Biblioteca del Monasterio, Cod. & II. 5 (Escorial Beatus)
- Valladolid, Biblioteca de la Universidad, (Valladolid Beatus)

=== Liturgical Manuscripts ===
- London, British Library, Add MS 30844 (Mozarabic Missal)
- London, British Library, Add MS 49598 (Benedictional of St. Æthelwold)
- London, British Library, Arundel MS 547 (Greek Gospel Lectionary)

=== Pope Gregory I ===
- Chantilly, Musée Condé, MS 14 (St. Gregory, Epistles)
- London, British Library, Egerton MS 3089 (Gregory, Dialogues)
- Madrid, Biblioteca Nacional, Cod. 80 (Gregory, Moralia in Job)

=== Dioscurides ===
- New York, Morgan Library & Museum, MS M. 652 (Morgan Dioscurides)

=== Miscellanies ===
- Cambridge, Corpus Christi College Library, MS 448 (Miscellany)
- London, British Library, Add MS 24199 (Miscellany)
- London, British Library, Cotton MS Vespasian D VI (Miscellany)
- London, British Library, Royal MS 15 A XVI (Poetic miscellany)

=== Tironian Lexicon ===
- London, British Library, Add MS 37518 (Tironian Lexicon)

=== Orosius ===
- London, British Library, Add MS 47967 (Tollemache Orosius)

=== Gregory of Nazianzus ===
- London, British Library, Add MS 36634 (Gregory of Nazianzus, Orations)

=== Sedulius ===
- London, British Library, Royal MS 15. B. XIX., part A (Sedulius, poems)

=== Monastic rules ===
- London, British Library, Add MS 30055 (Collection of Monastic Rules)

=== Hagiography ===
- London, British Library, Add MS 25600 (Passions of Saints at Cordova)
- Madrid, Biblioteca Nacional, Cod. 10007 (Vitae Patrum)

=== Cresconius ===
- Rome, Biblioteca Vallicelliana, MS A. 5 (Creconius, Concordia Canonum)

=== John Chrysostom ===
- The Hague, Musee Meermanno-Westreenianum, 10 B 5 (John Chrysostom, Homilies in Praise of St. Paul, the Apostle)

=== Pseudo-Apuleius ===
- The Hague, Musee Meermanno-Westreenianum, 10 D 7 (Pseudo-Apuleius)

=== Canon law ===
- San Lorenzo de El Escorial, Escorial, Biblioteca del Monasterio, d. I. 2 (Conciliar Codex of Albelda)

=== Isidore of Seville ===
- London, British Library, Cotton MS Domitian I (Isidore of Seville, De natura rerum)
- San Lorenzo de El Escorial, Escorial, Biblioteca del Monasterio, T. II. 24 (Isidore of Seville, Etymologiae)

=== Aldhelm ===
- London, British Library, Royal MS 5 E XI (Aldhelm, In Praise Of Virginity (London, British Library, Royal MS 5 E XI))
- London, British Library, Royal MS 5 F III (Aldhelm, In Praise Of Virginity (London, British Library, Royal MS 5 F III))
- London, British Library, Royal MS 6 A VI (Aldhelm, In Praise Of Virginity (London, British Library, Royal MS 6 A VI))
- London, British Library, Royal MS 7. D. XXIV (In Praise Of Virginity (London, British Library, Royal MS 7. D. XXIV))

=== Legal texts ===
- London, British Library, Cotton MS Otho E XIII (Legal Miscellany)

=== Biblical commentary ===
- London, British Library, Royal MS 4 A XIV (Commentary On Psalms 109–149)

=== Medical texts ===
- London, British Library, Royal MS 12 D XVII (Bald's Leechbook)
- Florence, Biblioteca Medicea Laurenziana, Plut. 74. 7 (Medical miscellany)

== 11th century ==
=== Gospel Books ===
- Baltimore, Walters Art Museum, MS W. 7 (Gospel Book)
- Bamberg, Bamberg State Library, Msc.Bibl. (Gospels of Henry II, Clm 4452)
- Bremen, Staatsbibliothek, MS b. 21 (Gospels of Henry III)
- Jerusalem, St James Treasury, J2556 (Kars Gospels )
- The Hague, Koninklijke Bibliotheek, 135 F 10 (Gospels)
- London, British Library, Add MS 28106 and 28107 (Gospel Book)
- London, British Library, Add MS 37001 (Greek Gospel Book)
- London, British Library, Harley MS 2820 (Cologne Gospels)
- London, British Library, Harley MS 2821. (Ottonian Gospel Book)
- London, British Library, Loan MS 11 (Kederminster Gospels)
- Moscow, Russian State Library, museum collection of manuscripts, No.1666 (Archangel Gospel)
- Moscow, Russian State Library, museum collection of manuscripts, No.1689 (Codex Marianus, or Mariinsky Gospel)
- Nuremberg, Germanisches Nationalmuseum, MS 156142 (Codex Aureus of Echternach)
- Prague, The National Library of the Czech Republic, MS XIV A 13, (Vyšehrad Codex), 1086
- Saint Petersburg, Russian National Library, (Ostromir Gospels)
- San Lorenzo de El Escorial, Escorial, Real Biblioteca, Cod. Vitrinas 17, (Golden Gospels of Henry III)
- Uppsala, Uppsala University Library, C 93 (Emperor's Bible)
- Yerevan, Matenadaran, M6201 (Armenian Gospels of 1038)
- Yerevan, Matenadaran, M3593 (Armenian Gospels of 1053 )
- Yerevan, Matenadaran, M7736 (Mugni Gospels)

=== Psalters ===
- Baltimore, The Walters Art Museum, MS W.530B (Vatopedi Psalter)
- Dublin, Trinity College Dublin, MS 50 (Ricemarsh Psalter)
- Hildesheim, Church of St. Godehard, s.n. (St. Albans Psalter)
- London, British Library, Add MS 19352 (Theodore Psalter (Studion Psalter))
- London, British Library, Add MS 40731. (Psalter)
- London, British Library, Arundel MS 155 (Eadui Psalter (Arundel Psalter))
- London, British Library, MS Cotton Tiberias C. VI (Tiberias Psalter)
- London, British Library, MS Cotton Vitellius F. XI (Vitellius Psalter)
- London, British Library, Harley MS 603 (Harley Psalter)
- London, British Library, MS Stowe 2 (Psalter)

=== New Testament ===
- London, British Library, Add MS 39599 (Book of Acts and Epistles)

=== Apocalypse manuscripts ===
- Bamberg, Bamberg State Library, Msc.Bibl.140 (Bamberg Apocalypse)

=== Beatus manuscripts ===
- Burgo de Osma, Archivo de la Cateral, Cod. 1, (Osma Beatus)
- Escorial, Biblioteca del Monasterio, &. II. 5 (Escorial Beatus)
- Madrid, Biblioteca Nacional, MS Vitrina 14-2 (Facundus Beatus)
- New York, Morgan Library & Museum, M. 1079, ff. 6-12 (Fanlo Beatus)
- Paris, Bibliothèque nationale, MS lat. 8878 (Saint-Sever Beatus)

=== Liturgical manuscripts ===
- London, British Library, Add MS 30337. (Exultet roll)
- London, British Library, Add MS 30850 (Mozarabic Antiphoner)
- Munich, Bayerische Staatsbibliothek, Clm 4452 (Pericopes of Henry II)
- Munich, Bayerische Staatsbibliothek, Clm 15713 (Salzburg Pericopes)
- Prague, National Library of the Czech Republic, (Codex Vyssegradensis)
- Vatican, Biblioteca Apostolica Vatican, Barb. Lat. 592 (Exultet roll)
- Warsaw, Poland, Biblioteka Narodowa, BN rps BOZ 8 (Tyniec Sacramentarium)

=== Miscellanies ===
- Brussels, Bibliothèque royale Albert 1er, Bibl. Roy 10074. (Miscellany)
- Moscow, State Historical Museum, Two Miscellenies of Svyatoslav II (1073, 1076).
- Oxford, Bodleian Library (Caedmon manuscript)

=== Pope Gregory I ===
- Bamberg, Bamberg State Library, Msc.Bibl.84 (Gregory, Moralia in Job)

=== St. Augustine ===
- Durham Cathedral Library, MS B II 13 (Augustine. Commentary on the Psalter)
- London, British Library, Royal MS 5 B II (Augustine, Miscellaneous Works)

=== Bibles ===
- London, British Library, Add MS 28107 (Stavelot Bible)
- Biblioteca Vaticana, Ms Lat 5729 (Ripoll Bible, also known as Farfa Bible)
- Paris, Bibliothèque nationale, Ms Lat 6 (Rodes Bible, also known as Noailles Bible)

=== St. Jerome ===
- The Hague, Musee Meermanno-Westreenianum, 10 A 3 (Jerome, Letters)

=== Smaragdus of Saint-Mihiel ===
- The Hague, Musee Meermanno-Westreenianum, 10 D 13 (Smaragdus, Diadema monachorum)

=== St. Ildefonsus ===
- Florence, Biblioteca Mediceo Lauenziana, MS Ashb. 17 (Ildefonsus, On the Virginty of Mary)

=== Prayer books ===
- Santiago de Compostela, Biblioteca de la Universidad, Res. 1 (Prayer Book of Fernando and Sancha)

=== Oppian ===
- Venice, Biblioteca Marciana, Gr. Z. 479 (Oppian, Cynegetica)

=== Hagiography ===
- Florence, Biblioteca Nazionale Centrale, MS II. I. 412 (Passionary)

== 12th century ==
=== Bestiaries and Aviaries ===
- Aberdeen, Aberdeen University Library, MS 24 (Aberdeen Bestiary)
- Bruges, Grootseminarie Brugge, MS. 89/54 (Ter Duinen Aviary)
- Cambridge, Corpus Christi College, MS 22 (Bestiary)
- London, British Library, Add MS 11283 (Bestiary)
- London, British Library, Harley MS 4751 (Bestiary)
- New York, Morgan Library & Museum, MS M. 81 (Worksop Bestiary)

=== Psalters ===
- Chantilly, Musée Condé, MS 9 (Ingeborg Psalter)
- Cambridge, (now kept at University Library), Trinity College, MS R.17.1 (Eadwine Psalter)
- Copenhagen, National Library of Denmark, MS. Thott 143 2º (Copenhagen Psalter)
- Glasgow, Glasgow University Library, Sp Coll MS Hunter U.3.2 (229)(Hunterian Psalter)
- The Hague, Koninklijke Bibliotheek, 76 E 11 (Psalter)
- The Hague, Koninklijke Bibliotheek, 76 F 13 (Fécamp Psalter)
- The Hague, Musee Meermanno-Westreenianum, 10 B 15 (Psalter)
- Hildesheim, Dombibliothek, Sankt Godehard Hs 1 (St. Albans Psalter / Albani Psalter / Psalter of Christina of Markyate)
- Leiden, Universiteitsbibliotheek, BPL 76 A (Psalter)
- London, British Library, MS Cotton Nero C. IV. (Winchester Psalter)
- London, British Library, MS Egerton 1139 (Melisende Psalter)
- London, British Library, Lansdowne MS 383 (Shaftesbury Psalter)
- London, British Library, Royal MS 2. A. XXII. (Westminster Psalter)
- London, British Library, Yates Thompson MS 40 (Camaldoli Psalter)
- Oxford, Bodleian Library, MS Auct. D 4 VI (Psalter)
- Oxford, Bodleian Library, MS Gough lit. 2 (Gough Psalter)

=== Bibles ===
- Cambridge, Corpus Christi College, MS 4 (Dover Bible)
- Cambridge, Corpus Christi College, MS 2 (Bury St. Edmunds Bible)
- Durham, Cathedral Library, MS A. II. 1 (Bible of Hugh de Puiset)
- London, British Library, Add MS 14788, 14789, 14790. (Parc Abbey Bible)
- London, British Library, Add MS 17738 (Floreffe Bible)
- London, British Library, Harley MS 2799 (Arnstein Bible)
- London, British Library, Harley MS 2803 & 2804 (Worms Bible)
- London, Lambeth Palace, MS3 (Lambeth Bible)
- Winchester, Cathedral Library, MS 17 (Winchester Bible)

=== Gospel Books ===
- The Hague, Koninklijke Bibliotheek, 76 E 17 (Gospels)
- Florence, Biblioteca Medicea Laurenziana, Acq. E Doni 91 (Gospel Book)
- London, British Library, Add MS 4949 (Greek Gospel Book)
- London, British Library, Harley MS 1802 (Gospels of Mael Brigte)
- Oxford, Corpus Christi College, MS 122. (Corpus Irish Gospel)
- Wolfenbüttel, Herzog August Bibliothek, Cod. Guelff. 105 Noviss 2 and Munich, Bayerische Staatsbibliothek, Clm 30055 (Gospels of Henry the Lion)

=== Octateuchs ===
- Istanbul, Topkapı Palace Library, Cod. gr. 8 ("Seraglio Octateuch")

=== Liturgical manuscripts ===
- Florence, Biblioteca Medicea Laurenziana, Conv. Soppr. 292 (Sacramentary)
- London, British Library, Harley MS 2800, 2801 and 2802 (Arnstein Passional)
- London, British Library, Harley MS 2889 (Siegburg Lectionary)
- London, British Library, Harley MS 2897 (Breviary of John the Fearless)
- London, British Library, Yates Thompson MS 2 (Ottobeuren Collectar)
- Lund, Lund University, Mh 6 (Necrologium Lundense)
- Lund, Lund University, Mh 7 (Liber daticus vetustior)
- Oxford, Corpus Christi College, MS 282. (Corpus Irish Missal)
- Skara, Stifts- och landsbiblioteket i Skara, Skara Missal
- Woolhampton, Douai Abbey, MS II (Liturgical fragment)

=== Miscellanies ===
- Brussels, Bibliothèque royale Albert 1er, Bibl. Roy. 18421-29 (Miscellany)
- Brussels, Bibliothèque royale Albert 1er, MS. II, 1076 (Miscellany)
- London, British Library, Royal MS 5 B VIII (Miscellany)
- Basra, Abbasid Caliphate, Maqamat al-Hariri (The Assemblies of al-Hariri)

=== Aratus of Soli ===
- Aberystwyth, National Library of Wales, MS 735C (Aratus of Soli, Phaenomena)

=== Peter Lombard ===
- Baltimore, Walters Art Museum, MS W. 809 (Peter Lombard, Sentences)

=== Zacharias Chrysopolitanus ===
- Camarillo, California, Doheny Library, MS 7 (Zacharias Chrysopolitanus, Unum ex Quatuor)

=== Jerome ===
- Cambridge, Trinity College, MS O. 4. 7. (Jerome, Commentaries on Old Testament)

=== Augustine ===
- Chicago, Newberry Library, MS Ry. 24 (Augustine, works)
- Lincoln, Cathedral, MS A I. 18 (Augustine, On the Psalms)
- Lincoln, Cathedral, MS A. 3. 17 (Augustine, Semons)
- London, British Library, Royal MS 5 D VII (Augustine, City of God)

=== Historical works ===
- Dublin, Royal Irish Academy (Lebor na hUidre, (Book of the Dun Cow))

=== Berengaudus ===
- Durham, Cathedral Library, MS A. I. 10 (Berengaudus, On the Apocalypse)

=== Other Biblical texts ===
- Durham, Cathedral Library, MS A. III. 17 (Isaiah glossed)
- San Marino, California, Huntington Library, HM 56 (Pauline Epistles, glossed)

=== Pope Gregory I ===
- Eton, Eton College Library, MS 226 (Gregory, Moralia on Job)

=== Simon Metaphrastes ===
- London, British Library, Add MS 11870 (Simeon Metaphrastes, Lives of Saints)

=== Bede ===
- London, British Library, Yates Thompson MS 26. (Bede, Life of St. Cuthbert) (Yates Thompson Bede)

=== New Testament ===
- Oxford, Bodleian Library, MS. Auct. T. inf. 1. 10 (Codex Ebnerianus)

=== Heliand ===
- London, British Library, MS Cotton Caligula, A. VII. (Heliand Manuscript)

=== Cartularies ===
- London, British Library, Add MS 15350 (Cartulary of the Priory of St. Swithin, Winchester)

=== Hagiography ===
- Ljubljana, Slovenia, Narodna in univerzitetna knjiznica v Ljubljani (Collectarium (William of St-Thierry, Life of St Bernard; Lives and Martyrdoms of Saints))

=== Origen ===
- The Hague, Koninklijke Bibliotheek, 76 F 8 (Origen, Expositio super cantica canticorum)

=== James of Kokkinobaphos ===
- Paris, Bibliothèque nationale, MS gr. 1208 (James of Kokkinobaphos, Homilies on the Virgin)
- Vatican City, Biblioteca Apostolica, MS vat. gr. 1162 (James of Kokkinobaphos, Homilies on the Virgin)

=== Beatus manuscripts ===
- Berlin, Staatsbibliothek Preußischer Kulturbesitz, MS Theol. lat. Fol. 561 (Berlin Beatus)
- León, Archivo Histórico Provincial, Perg., Astorga 1 (León Beatus Fragment)
- Lisbon, Arquivo Nacional da Torre do Tombo (Lorvão Beatus)
- London, British Library, Add MS 11695 (Silos Beatus (Silos Apocalypse))
- Madrid, Museo Arqueológica Nacional, MS 2 (Cardeña Beatus)
- Manchester, John Rylands University Library, MS lat. 8 (Rylands Beatus)
- Paris, Bibliothèque nationale, nouv. acq. lat. 1366 (Beatus of Navarre)
- Rome, Biblioteca del'Accademia Nazionale dei Lincei e Corsiniana, Segn 40. E. 6 (Corsini Beatus)
- Turin, Biblioteca Nazionale Universitaria, Sgn I. II. 1 (Turin Beatus)

=== Book of Antidotes ===
- Paris, Bibliothèque nationale, MS Arabe 2964 (Book of Antidotes)

=== Secular works ===
- Munich, Archives of the Bavarian State, BayHStA KL Weyarn 1 (Codex Falkensteinensis)

== 13th century ==
=== Bibles ===
- Baltimore, Walters Art Museum, MS W.152 (Conradin Bible)
- Paris, Bibliothèque nationale, Ms. Hébr. 7 (Hebrew Bible)
- The Hague, Koninklijke Bibliotheek, 76 E 22 (Bible)
- The Hague, Koninklijke Bibliotheek, 76 F 23 (Bible)
- The Hague, Koninklijke Bibliotheek, 76 G 2 (Bible)
- The Hague, Koninklijke Bibliotheek, 76 J 2 (Bible)
- The Hague, Koninklijke Bibliotheek, 132 F 21 (Bible)
- The Hague, Koninklijke Bibliotheek, 133 D 25 (Bible)
- The Hague, Musee Meermanno-Westreenianum, 10 E 32 (Bible)
- The Hague, Musee Meermanno-Westreenianum, 10 E 33 (Bible)
- The Hague, Musee Meermanno-Westreenianum, 10 E 34 (Bible)
- The Hague, Musee Meermanno-Westreenianum, 10 E 35 (Bible)
- The Hague, Musee Meermanno-Westreenianum, 10 E 36 (Bible)
- Jerusalem, Jewish National and University Library, Ms. Heb. 4°790 (Hebrew Bible)
- London, British Library, Royal MS 1. D. I. (Bible of William of Devon)
- London, British Library, Yates Thompson MS 1 (Fécamp Bible)
- London, British Library, Yates Thompson MS 22 (Brantwood Bible)
- New York, Morgan Library & Museum, Ms 638 (Morgan Bible)
- Stockholm, Sweden, Swedish Royal Library (Codex Gigas (Devil's Bible))

=== Bible Moralisée ===
- Oxford, Bodleian Library, MS Bodley 270b; Paris, Bibliothèque nationale, lat. 11560; London, British Library, Harley MS 1526 and 1527 (Oxford-Paris-London Bible Moralisée)
- Vienna, Österreichische Nationalbibliothek, Cod. Vind. 2554 (Bible Moralisée)
- Cathedral of Toledo treasury (St. Louis Bible)

=== Picture Bibles ===
- The Hague, Koninklijke Bibliothek, 76 F 5 (Picture Bible)
- Vienna, Austrian National Library, Cod. 2759–64 (Wenceslas Bible)

=== Gospel Books ===
- Yerevan, Matenadaran, MS 7648 (Gospel Book)
- Yerevan, Matenadaran, MS 1211 (Haghbat Gospel)
- Yerevan, Matenadaran, MS 2743 (Targmanchats Gospel)

=== Apocalypse manuscripts ===
- Cambridge, Trinity College, MS R. 16. 2 (Trinity Apocalypse)
- Lisbon, Calouste Gulbenkian Museum, L.A.139 (Gulbenkian Apocalypse)
- London, British Library, Add MS 35166 (Apocalypse)
- London, British Library, Add MS 38842 (Apocalypse fragment)
- London, British Library, Add MS 42555 (Abingdon Apocalypse)
- London, British Library, Royal MS 2. D. XIII (Apocalypse)
- London, Lambeth Palace, MS 209 (Lambeth Apocalypse)
- Oxford, Bodleian Library, MS Douce 180 (Douce Apocalypse)
- Paris, Bibliothèque nationale, MS fr. 403 (Paris Apocalypse)

=== Beatus manuscripts ===
- Ciudad de México, Archivo General de la Nación, Illustración 4852(Rioseco Beatus Fragment)
- New York, Morgan Library & Museum, M. 429 (Las Huelgas Beatus)
- Paris, Bibliothèque nationale, nouv. acq. lat. 2290 (Arroyo Beatus)

=== Psalters ===
- Florence, Biblioteca Medicea Laurenziana, Med. Pal. 13 (Psalter)
- The Hague, Koninklijke Bibliotheek, 130 E 13 (Psalter)
- London, British Library, Add MS 21114 (Psalter of Lambert de Bègue)
- London, British Library, Add MS 21926 (Grandisson Psalter)
- London, British Library, Add MS 24686 (Alphonso Psalter (Tenison Psalter))
- London, British Library, Add MS 28681 (Psalter Map Manuscript)
- London, British Library, Add MS 36929 (Psalter)
- London, British Library, Add MS 38116 (Huth Psalter)
- London, British Library, Add MS 50000 (Oscott Psalter)
- London, British Library, Add MS 62925 (Rutland Psalter)
- London, British Library, Egerton MS 2652 (Scandinavian Psalter)
- London, British Library, Sloane MS 2400 (Felbrigge Psalter)
- London, Society of Antiquaries, MS 59 (Psalter of Robert de Lindesey)
- New York, Morgan Library & Museum, MS 302 and Carinthia, St. Paul in Lavanttal, Stiftsbibliothek, MS XXV/2 (Ramsey Psalter)
- Moscow, Historical Museum, A. I. Chludov Collection, No. 3 (Simon Psalter)
- Paris, Bibliothèque de l'Arsenal, MS lat. 1186 (Psalter of Blanche of Castille)
- Paris, Bibliothèque nationale, MS. fr. 8846 (Great Canterbury Psalter, Anglo-Catalan Psalter or Paris Psalter - also part 14th-century)
- Paris, Bibliothèque nationale, MS lat. 10525 (Psalter of St. Louis)

=== Psalter and Hours ===
- The Hague, Koninklijke Bibliotheek, 76 G 17 (Psalter and Hours)
- The Hague, Koninklijke Bibliotheek, 135 G 18 (Psalter and Hours)
- New York, Morgan Library & Museum, MS 729 (The Psalter and Hours of Yolande of Soissons)

=== Books of Hours ===
- Baltimore, Walters Art Museum, W.102, (Walters Book of Hours)
- London, British Library, Add MS 48985 (Salvin Hours)
- London, British Library, Add MS 49999 (De Brailes Hours (Dyson Perrins Hours))
- London, British Library, Harley MS 928 (Harley Hours)
- Syracuse University Library, Special Collections Research Center, MS 5 (Book of Hours)

=== Liturgical manuscripts ===
- Baltimore, Walters Art Museum MS 759 (Beaupré Antiphonary)
- The Hague, Koninklijke Bibliotheek, 74 G 31 (Diurnal)
- The Hague, Koninklijke Bibliotheek, 76 J 18 (Breviary)
- The Hague, Koninklijke Bibliotheek, 135 L 20 (Antiphonary)
- Manchester, John Rylands Library, MS lat. 24 (Missal of Henry of Chichester)
- New York, Morgan Library & Museum, MS 710 (Berthold Missal)
- Prague, National Library of the Czech Republic, (Passionale Abbatissae Cunegundis)

=== Precepts ===
- Urbana, University of Illinois at Urbana–Champaign, Pre-1650 MS 98 (Rule of Saint Benedict from France)

=== Bestiaries and Aviaries ===
- Cambrai, Bibliothèque municipale de Cambrai, MS. 259 (Cambrai Aviary)
- Cambridge, Cambridge University Library, MS Gg. 6.5 (Bestiary)
- Cambridge, Cambridge University Library, MS Ii. 4. 26 (Bestiary)
- Cambridge, Cambridge University Library, MS Kk. 4. 25 (Bestiary)
- Cambridge, Fitzwilliam Museum, MS 254 (Bestiary)
- London, British Library, Royal MS 12 F XIII (Rochester Bestiary)
- Oxford, Bodleian Library, MS Ashmole 1511 (Ashmole Bestiary)

=== Miscellanies ===
- Bordeaux, Bibliothèque municipale de Bordeaux, MS. 995 (Miscellany)
- Brussels, Bibilothèque royale Albert 1er, MS 8536-43 (Miscellany)
- London, British Library, Cotton MS Cleopatra B IX (Chess miscellany)

=== Joannitius ===
- Bethesda, Maryland, National Library of Medicine (Joannitius, Isagoge)

=== Thomas Aquinas ===
- Brussels, Bibliothèque royale Albert 1er, MS II. 934 (Thomas Aquinas, Commentary on the Sentences)

=== Hagiography ===
- Bucharest, National Academy Library, MS grec 1294 Sec. XII Greece (Ioan Sinaitul, Canon of mercy)
- Dublin, Trinity College Library, MS E. I. 40 (Dublin Life of Saint Alban)

=== Hugh of St. Cher ===
- Durham, Cathedral Library, MS A. I. 16 (Hugh of St. Cher, Commentary on the Pauline Epistles)

=== Fechtbücher ===
- Leeds, Royal Armories, British Museum No. 14 E iii, No. 20, D. vi., (I.33)

=== Gratian ===
- Liège, University Library, MS 499 (Gratian, Decretum)

=== Chronicles ===
- London, British Library, Add MS 21212 (William of Brittany, Chronicle of Philip Augustus)
- Paris Bibliothèque nationale, MS Fr. 9081 (William of Tyre, Histoire d'Outremer)

=== Giles de Paris ===
- London, British Library, Add MS 22399 (Gilles de Paris, poem)

=== Song Collections ===
- San Lorenzo de El Escorial, Escorial, Real Biblioteca, MS. T. I. I (E Codex of the Cantigas de Santa Maria) (Canticles of Alfonso the Wise)
- Cantigas de Santa Maria

=== Raymond of Peñafort ===
- San Marino, California, California, Huntington Library, HM 57 (Raymond of Peñafort, Summa)

=== Ptolemy ===
- San Marino, California, Huntington Library, HM 65 (Ptolemy, Almagest)

=== Peter Lombard ===
- The Hague, Koninklijke Bibliotheek, 71 A 22 (Peter Lombard, Glossa in Epistulas Pauli)
- The Hague, Koninklijke Bibliotheek, 135 F 8 (Peter Lombard, Commentarius in psalmos)

=== Martin of Opava ===
- The Hague, Koninklijke Bibliotheek, 71 G 63 (Martin of Opava, Chronicon Imperatorum)

=== St. Jerome ===
- The Hague, Koninklijke Bibliotheek, 72 J 16 (Jerome, Sermons)

=== Romances ===
- Bonn, Universitätsbibliothek, MS S. 526 (Roman de Lancelot du Lac)
- The Hague, Koninklijke Bibliotheek, 78 D 47 (Histoire ancienne jusqu'à César)
- Cambridge, Trinity College, MS O.9.34. (Thomas of Kent, Roman de Toute Chevalerie)

=== Eddas ===
- Reykjavík, Árni Magnússon Institute for Icelandic Studies (Codex Regius)

=== Genealogy ===
- The Hague, Koninklijke Bibliotheek, 75 A 2/2 (Genealogy of the Kings of England)

=== Moses ben Abraham ===
- The Hague, Koninklijke Bibliotheek, 131 A 3 (Moses ben Abraham, Chroniques de la Bible)

=== Avicenna ===
- The Hague, Musee Meermanno-Westreenianum, 10 B 24 (Avicenna, Canon medicinae)

=== Obituary rolls ===
- London, British Library, Egerton MS 2849 (Obituary Roll Of Lucy, First Prioress of Hedingham)

=== Lucas de Gail ===
- Modena, Biblioteca Estense, Est. 59 (Lucas de Gail, Roman de Tristan)

=== Pliny the Elder ===
- Florence, Biblioteca Laurenziana, Plut. 83 (Pliny the Elder, Naturalis historia)

=== Justinian ===
- Verona, Biblioteca Capitolare, MS CLXXIII (Justinian, Corpus Iuris Civilis)

=== Al-Mubashshir ===
- Istanbul, Topkapi Palace Library, MS Ahmed III, 3206 (Al-Mubashshir, True Sayings and Speeches)

=== Dioscorides ===
- Istanbul, Topkapi Palace Library, MS Ahmed III, 2127 (Dioscorides, De Materia Medica)

=== Ahmad ibn al-Husain ibn Ahnaf ===
- Istanbul, Topkapi sarayi Museum, MS Ahmed III. 2115 (Ahmad ibn al-Husain ibn Ahnaf, The Book of the Art of Healing Horses)

=== Abu Muhammed al-Hariri ===
- Paris, Bibliothèque nationale, MS Arabe 5847 (Abu Muhammed al-Hariri, The Maqamat)

=== Frederick II ===
- Vatican, Biblioteca Apostolica, Pal. lat. 1071 (De arte venandi cum avibus)

== 14th century ==
=== Psalters ===
- Cambridge, Fitzwilliam, Macclesfield Psalter
- The Hague, Koninklijke Bibliotheek, MS 75 H 40 (Psalter)
- The Hague, Koninklijke Bibliotheek, MS 128 G 29 (Psalter)
- The Hague, Koninklijke Bibliotheek, MS 135 E 15 (Psalter)
- London, British Library, Add MS 42130. (Luttrell Psalter)
- London, British Library, Add MS 49622 (Gorleston Psalter)
- London, British Library, Arundel MS 83 pt. 2 (De Lisle Psalter)
- London, British Library, Royal MS 2. B. VII (Queen Mary Psalter)
- London, British Library, Yates Thompson MS 14 (St. Omer Psalter)
- Moscow, State Historical Museum, MS2752 (Tomich Psalter)
- Munich, Bavarian State Library, MS Cod. slav. 4, Munich Serbian Psalter
- New York, The Cloisters Museum (Psalter of Bonne de Luxembourg)
- New York, Public Library, Spencer Collection MS 26 (Tickhill Psalter)
- Oxford, Bodleian Library, MS Douce 366 (Ormesby Psalter)
- Paris, Bibliothèque nationale, MS. fr. 8846 (Great Canterbury Psalter, Anglo-Catalan Psalter or Paris Psalter - also part 13th-century)
- Paris, Bibliothèque nationale, MS. fr. 13091 (Psalter of Jean, Duc de Berry)
- Tournai, Archives et Bibliothèque de la Cathédrale, B.C.T. A 17 (Psalter of Louis X)
- Vienna, Österreichische Nationalbibliothek, Cod. 1826 (Vienna Bohun Psalter)
- Saint Petersburg, Rossiiskaya Natsionalnaya Biblioteka (Kiev Psalter of 1397)

=== Books of Hours ===
- The Hague, Koninklijke Bibliotheek, MS KA 36 (Book of Hours and Prayer Book)
- The Hague, Koninklijke Bibliotheek, MS 76 F 6 (Hours of Isabella of Castile)
- The Hague, Koninklijke Bibliotheek, MS 76 G 3 (Book of Hours)
- London, British Library, Arundel MS 83 pt. 1 (Howard Psalter and Hours)
- London, British Library, Egerton MS 2781 (Neville of Hornby Hours)
- London, British Library, Egerton MS 3277 (Bohun Psalter and Hours)
- London, British Library, Stowe MS 17 (Maastricht Hours)
- London, British Library, Yates Thompson MS 13 (Taymouth Hours)
- London, British Library, Yates Thompson MS 27 (Hours of Yolande of Flanders)
- London, British Library, Yates Thompson MS 45 (Hours of Nicolas Rolin)
- New York, The Cloisters Museum, (Hours of Jeanne d'Evreux)
- New York, The Cloisters Museum, (Belles Heures of Jean de France, Duc de Berry)
- Paris, Bibliothèque nationale, MS lat. 18014 (Petites Heures of Jean, Duc de Berry)
- Paris, Bibliothèque nationale, MS Nouv. Acq. lat. 3093 (Très Belles Heures de Notre-Dame)
- Paris, Bibliothèque nationale, MS Nouv. Acq. lat. 3145 (Hours of Jeanne de Navarre)
- Urbana, University of Illinois at Urbana–Champaign, Pre-1650 MS 76 (Lyte Family Book of Hours)

=== Liturgical manuscripts ===
- Chantilly, Musée Condé, s. n. (Breviary of Jeanne d'Évreux)
- The Hague, Musee Meermanno-Westreenianum, MS 10. A. 14 (Missal)
- The Hague, Koninklijke Bibliotheek, MS 76 F 29 (Breviary)
- The Hague, Koninklijke Bibliotheek, MS 78 D 40 (Festal Missal)
- The Hague, Musee Meermanno-Westreenianum, MS 10 A 14 (Missal)
- The Hague, Musee Meermanno-Westreenianum, MS 10 A 16 (Missal)
- The Hague, Musee Meermanno-Westreenianum, MS 10 D 26 (Missal)
- London, British Library, Add MS 29704, 29705, 44892 (Carmelite Missal)
- London, British Library, Stowe MS 12 (Stowe Breviary)
- London, British Library, Yates Thompson MS 8 (Breviary of Renaud de Bar)
- London, British Library, Yates Thompson MS 24 (Pontifical of Guilelmo Durando)
- London, British Library, Yates Thompson MS 34 (Epistolary of the Sainte Chapelle)
- London, Victoria and Albert Museum, MS 1346-1891 (Missal of Saint-Denis)
- London, Westminster Abbey, MS 37 (Litlyngton Missal, given by abbot Nicholas de Litlyngton)
- London, Westminster Abbey, MS 38 (Liber Regalis)
- Paris, Bibliothèque nationale, MS lat. 861 (Missal for the Use of Paris)
- Paris, Bibliothèque nationale, MS lat. 1052 (Breviary of Charles V)
- Paris, Bibliothèque nationale, MS lat. 10483-10484 (Belleville Breviary)
- Paris, Bibliothèque Sainte-Geneviève, MS 148 (Pontifical of Pierre de Treigny)
- Prague, National Library of the Czech Republic, MS A. 17, XIV (Passional of Abbess Kunigunde)
- Urbana, University of Illinois at Urbana–Champaign, Pre-1650 MS 124 (Coronation book of Charles IV of France and Jeanne d'Évreux)
- Vatican City, Biblioteca Apostolica, MS. Urb. lat. 603 (Breviary of Blanche de France)

=== Bestiaries ===
- Brussels, Bibliothèque royale Albert 1er, MS 8340. (Bestiary)
- Cambridge, Corpus Christi College, MS 53 (Peterborough Bestiary)
- Cambridge, Fitzwilliam Museum, J. 20. (Bestiary of Guillaume le Clerc)
- Cambridge, Fitzwilliam Museum, MS 379. (Bestiary)

=== Bibles ===
- Paris, Bibliothèque de l'Arsenal, MS 5069 (Bible of Jean Papeleu)
- Paris, Bibliothèque nationale, MS fr. 15397 (Bible of Jean de Sy)
- Paris, Bibliothèque nationale, MS lat. 11935 (Bible of Robert de Billyng)

=== Bible Historiales ===
- Geneva, Bibliothèque Publique et Universitaire, MS Fr. 2 (Geneva Bible Historiale)
- The Hague, Koninklijke Bibliotheek, MS 71 A 23 (Bible Historiale)
- The Hague, Koninklijke Bibliotheek, MS 78 D 43 (Bible Historiale)
- The Hague, Musee Meermanno-Westreenianum, MS 10 B. 23 (Bible Historiale of Jean de Vaudetar)
- The Hague, Musee Meermanno-Westreenianum, MS 10 B 23 (Petrus Comestor, Bible historial, Guyars des Moulins translation)
- Paris, Bibliothèque de l'Arsenal, MS 5212 (Bible Historiale of Charles V)
- Saint Petersburg, Russian National Library, Bible Historiale of d'Albret Family, in 2 volumes

=== Bible Moralisée ===
- Paris, Bibliothèque nationale, MS fr. 167 (Bible Moralisée of Jean le Bon)

=== Biblical picture books ===
- London, British Library, Egerton MS 1894 (Egerton Genesis Picture Book)
- Prague, National Library of the Czech Republic, (Velislai biblia picta)

=== New Testament ===
- The Hague, Koninklijke Bibliotheek, MS 75 E 8 (New Testament)

=== Apocalypse manuscripts ===
- Dublin, Trinity College Library, MS 64 (Dublin Apocalypse)
- London, British Library, Add MS 17333 (Val-Dieu Apocalypse)
- London, British Library, Add MS 18633 (Apocalypse)
- London, British Library, Add MS 22493 (Apocalypse fragment)
- London, British Library, Add MS 38121 (Apocalypse & Life of John)
- London, British Library, Royal MS 15. D. II (Welles/Greenfield Apocalypse)
- London, British Library, Royal MS 19. B. XV (Queen Mary Apocalypse)

=== Hagiography ===
- London, British Library, Royal MS 19. C. IV (Songe du Verger)
- Paris, Bibliothèque nationale, MS fr. 2090-2092 (Life of Saint Denis)
- Paris, Bibliothèque nationale, MS Nouv. Acq. fr. 24541 (Miracles of Our Lady)

=== Romances ===
- London, British Library, Add MS 10292-10294 (Saint Graal)
- London, British Library, Add MS 23930 (Hélie de Borron, Romance of Guiron le Courtois)
- Paris, Bibliothèque nationale, MS fr. 146 (Roman de Fauvel)

=== Dante ===
- Florence, Biblioteca Medicea Laurenziana, MS 152 (Dante, Divine Comedy)
- Florence, Biblioteca Nazionale Centrale di Firenze, Palat. MS 313 (Dante, Divine Comedy)

=== Aristotle ===
- Brussels, Bibliothèque royale Albert 1er, MS 9505-9506 (Aristotle's Ethics)
- The Hague, Musee Meermanno-Westreenianum, MS 10 D 1 (Aristotle, Ethiques, Nicolas Oresme translation)

=== Boccaccio ===
- Berlin, Staatsbibliothek Preußischer Kulturbesitz, MS Hamilton 90 (Boccaccio, Decameron)

=== Petrarch ===
- Darmstadt, Hessischen Landes und Hofschulbibliothek, MS 101 (Petrarch, De Viris Illustribus)

=== Legal manuscripts ===
- Dresden, ?, MS 32 (Sachsenspiegel)
- Paris, Bibliothèque nationale, MS lat. 3893 (Decretum Gratiani)
- Vatican, Biblioteca Apostolica, Ross. 555 (Jacob Ben Asher, Arba’ah Turim)

=== Mirrors ===
- The Hague, Koninklijke Bibliotheek, MS Ak. XX (Spieghel Historiael)
- Leiden, Universiteitsbibliotheek, VGG F 3A (Miroir Historial of Vincent de Beauvais)
- London, British Library, Add MS 16578 (Speculum Humanae Salvationis)

=== Literary compilations ===
- Heidelberg, University Library, Cod. Pal. germ. 848 (Codex Manesse)

=== Seneca ===
- London, British Library, Add MS 11987 (Seneca)

=== Gospel Books ===
- London, British Library, Add MS 39627 (Gospels of Tsar Ivan Alexander)
- St Petersburg, Library of the Russian Academy of Sciences, Siysky Gospel from 1339

=== Chronicles ===
- Budapest, Országos Széchényi Könyvtár, (Chronicon Hungariae Pictum (Chronica de Gestis Hungarorum or Képes Krónika or The Illuminated Chronicle 1360))
- London, British Library, Add MS 39758 (Chronicle and Chartulary of the Abbey of Peterborough)
- Paris, Bibliothèque nationale, MS lat. 2813 (Charles V's Grandes Chroniques de France)
- St. Gall, Kantonsbibliothek, Vadiana, MS 302 Vad. (World Chronicle and Charlemagne)

=== Guillaume de Machaut ===
- Paris, Bibliothèque nationale, MS fr. 1586 (Works of Guillaume de Machaut)

=== Livy ===
- The Hague, Koninklijke Bibliothek, MS 71 A 16 (Livy, History)
- Paris, Bibliothèque Sainte-Geneviève, MS 777 (Livy of Charles V)

=== Sagas ===
- Reykjavík, Arnamagnæan Institute, GkS 1005 fol (Flatey Book)

=== Guillaume Durand ===
- Vienna, Austria, Österreichische Nationalbibliothek, (Guillaume Durand, Rationale divinorum officiorum)
- Bucharest, National Academy Library, MS lat. 2, (Guillaume Durand, Rationale divinorum officiorum)

=== Music manuscripts ===
- London, British Library, Add MS 57950 (Old Hall Manuscript)

=== Prayerbooks ===
- Vatican, Apostolic Library, (Vatican Croatian Prayer Book)

=== Jacob van Maerlant ===
- The Hague, Koninklijke Bibliothek, MS KA 16 (Jacob van Maerlant, Der Naturen Bloeme)
- The Hague, Koninklijke Bibliothek, MS KA 20 (Jacob van Maerlant, Spieghel Historiael)
- The Hague, Koninklijke Bibliothek, MS 76 E 16 (Jacob van Maerlant, Rijmbijbel. and Die wrake van Jherusalem)
- The Hague, Musee Meermanno-Westreenianum, MS 10 B 21 (Jacob van Maerlant, Rhimebible)

=== Augustine ===
- The Hague, Koninklijke Bibliothek, MS 71 A 1 (Augustine, De civitate Dei and Liber de cura pro mortuis gerenda)

=== Guillaume de Lorris and Jean de Meun ===
- Chantilly, Musée Condé, MS 482/665 (Guillaume de Lorris and Jean de Meung, Roman de la Rose)
- The Hague, Koninklijke Bibliothek, MS 120 D 13 (Guillaume de Lorris and Jean de Meung, Roman de la Rose)
- The Hague, Musee Meermanno-Westreenianum, MS 10 B 29 (Guillaume de Lorris and Jean de Meung, Roman de la Rose)

=== Miscellany ===
- The Hague, Koninklijke Bibliothek, MS 76 E 5 (Miscellany)
- The Hague, Koninklijke Bibliothek, MS KA 24 (Miscellany)
- The Evergreen State College, Holly Rare Book Room, The Book of Malbourne, MS JR 193 (Miscellany)

=== Sermons ===
- The Hague, Koninklijke Bibliothek, MS 70 E 5 (The Limburg Sermons)

=== Gautier de Coinsi ===
- The Hague, Koninklijke Bibliothek, MS 71 A 24 (Gautier de Coinsi, Les miracles de Notre Dame)

=== Johannes Januensis ===
- The Hague, Musee Meermanno-Westreenianum, MS 10 A 13 (Johannes Januensis, Catholicon)

=== Hippocrates ===
- The Hague, Musee Meermanno-Westreenianum, MS 10 B 22 (Hippocrates, Aphorismi et prognostica cum commentis Galeni)

=== Military treatises ===
- The Hague, Koninklijke Bibliothek, MS 73 J 22 (Vegetius, L'Art de chevallerie. Frontinus, Stratagèmes)

=== Cartularies ===
- The Hague, Koninklijke Bibliothek, MS 75 D 7 (Charters of the cities of Flanders)

=== Durand de Mende ===
- The Hague, Koninklijke Bibliothek, MS 78 D 41 (Durand de Mende, Le rational des divins offices de l'église)

=== Calendar ===
- The Hague, Koninklijke Bibliothek, MS 130 E 26 (Utrecht Calendar)

=== Atlases ===
- Paris, Bibliothèque nationale, MS Esp. 30 (Catalan Atlas)

=== Astrology and Astronomy ===
- London, British Library, Sloane MS 3983 (Liber astrologiae / Abū Maʿshar Treatise)

=== Valerius Maximus ===
- London, British Library, Arundel MS 7 (Valerius Maximus, Factorum et dictorum memorabilium)

== 15th century ==
=== Books of Hours ===
- Brussels, Bibliothèque royale, MS 11051 (Book of Hours)
- Brussels, Bibliothèque royale, ms. 11060-1 (Très Belles Heures du duc de Berry, also called Heures de Bruxelles)
- Cambridge, Fitzwilliam Museum, MS 62 (Hours of Isabella Stuart)
- Chantilly, Musée Condé, MS 71 (Hours of Étienne Chevalier) (40 images only)
- Chantilly, Musée Condé, MS 65 (Très Riches Heures du Duc de Berry)
- Chapel Hill, North Carolina, University of North Carolina, Ackland Art Museum, Ackland Fund, 69. 7. 2 (Book of Hours leaf)
- East Lansing, Michigan, Michigan State University Library, MS 2 (Book of Hours )
- Florence, Biblioteca Medicea Laurenziana, Ashb. 1874 (Book of Hours of Lorenzo de' Medici)
- Florence, Biblioteca Nazionale, Banco Rari 397 and Landau Finaly 22, (Visconti Hours)
- The Hague, Koninklijke Bibliothek, MS 71 G 54 (Book of Hours)
- The Hague, Koninklijke Bibliothek, MS 71 G 55 (Book of Hours)
- The Hague, Koninklijke Bibliothek, MS 74 F 1 (Book of Hours)
- The Hague, Koninklijke Bibliothek, MS 74 G 3 (Book of Hours)
- The Hague, Koninklijke Bibliothek, MS 74 G 5 (Book of Hours)
- The Hague, Koninklijke Bibliothek, MS 74 G 8 (Book of Hours)
- The Hague, Koninklijke Bibliothek, MS 74 G 22 (Book of Hours)
- The Hague, Koninklijke Bibliothek, MS 74 G 28 (Book of Hours)
- The Hague, Koninklijke Bibliothek, MS 74 G 30 (Book of Hours)
- The Hague, Koninklijke Bibliothek, MS 74 G 34 (Book of Hours)
- The Hague, Koninklijke Bibliothek, MS 74 G 35 (Book of Hours)
- The Hague, Koninklijke Bibliothek, MS 74 G 37 (Hours of Simon de Varie)
- The Hague, Koninklijke Bibliothek, MS 74 H 8 (Book of Hours)
- The Hague, Koninklijke Bibliothek, MS 74 H 31 (Book of Hours)
- The Hague, Koninklijke Bibliothek, MS 74 H 42 (Book of Hours)
- The Hague, Koninklijke Bibliothek, MS 75 G 2 (Book of Hours)
- The Hague, Koninklijke Bibliothek, MS 75 H 43 (Book of Hours)
- The Hague, Koninklijke Bibliothek, MS 76 F 2 (Hours of Philip of Burgundy)
- The Hague, Koninklijke Bibliothek, MS 76 F 7 (Hours of Catherine of Aragon)
- The Hague, Koninklijke Bibliothek, MS 76 F 14 (Book of Hours)
- The Hague, Koninklijke Bibliothek, MS 76 F 15 (Book of Hours)
- The Hague, Koninklijke Bibliothek, MS 76 F 17 (Book of Hours)
- The Hague, Koninklijke Bibliothek, MS 76 F 18 (Book of Hours)
- The Hague, Koninklijke Bibliothek, MS 76 F 21 (Book of Hours)
- The Hague, Koninklijke Bibliothek, MS 76 F 22 (Book of Hours)
- The Hague, Koninklijke Bibliothek, MS 76 F 25 (Book of Hours)
- The Hague, Koninklijke Bibliothek, MS 76 F 27 (Book of Hours)
- The Hague, Koninklijke Bibliothek, MS 76 F 30 (Book of Hours)
- The Hague, Koninklijke Bibliothek, MS 76 F 31 (Book of Hours)
- The Hague, Koninklijke Bibliothek, MS 76 G 5 (Book of Hours)
- The Hague, Koninklijke Bibliothek, MS 76 G 7 (Book of Hours)
- The Hague, Koninklijke Bibliothek, MS 76 G 8 (Book of Hours)
- The Hague, Koninklijke Bibliothek, MS 76 G 9 (Book of Hours)
- The Hague, Koninklijke Bibliothek, MS 76 G 10 (Book of Hours)
- The Hague, Koninklijke Bibliothek, MS 76 G 11 (Book of Hours)
- The Hague, Koninklijke Bibliothek, MS 76 G 12 (Book of Hours)
- The Hague, Koninklijke Bibliothek, MS 76 G 13 (Book of Hours)
- The Hague, Koninklijke Bibliothek, MS 76 G 14 (Book of Hours)
- The Hague, Koninklijke Bibliothek, MS 76 G 16 (Book of Hours)
- The Hague, Koninklijke Bibliothek, MS 76 G 18 (Book of Hours)
- The Hague, Koninklijke Bibliothek, MS 76 G 19 (Book of Hours)
- The Hague, Koninklijke Bibliothek, MS 76 G 20 (Book of Hours)
- The Hague, Koninklijke Bibliothek, MS 76 G 21 (Book of Hours)
- The Hague, Koninklijke Bibliothek, MS 76 G 22 (Book of Hours)
- The Hague, Koninklijke Bibliothek, MS 76 G 23 (Book of Hours)
- The Hague, Koninklijke Bibliothek, MS 76 G 27 (Book of Hours)
- The Hague, Koninklijke Bibliothek, MS 76 G 28 (Book of Hours)
- The Hague, Koninklijke Bibliothek, MS 77 L 45 (Book of Hours)
- The Hague, Koninklijke Bibliothek, MS 77 L 58 (Book of Hours)
- The Hague, Koninklijke Bibliothek, MS 77 L 59 (Book of Hours)
- The Hague, Koninklijke Bibliothek, MS 77 L 60 (Book of Hours)
- The Hague, Koninklijke Bibliothek, MS 78 J 7 (Book of Hours)
- The Hague, Koninklijke Bibliothek, MS 79 K 1 (Book of Hours)
- The Hague, Koninklijke Bibliothek, MS 79 K 2 (Book of Hours)
- The Hague, Koninklijke Bibliothek, MS 79 K 5 (Book of Hours)
- The Hague, Koninklijke Bibliothek, MS 128 G 31 (Book of Hours)
- The Hague, Koninklijke Bibliothek, MS 130 E 2 (Book of Hours)
- The Hague, Koninklijke Bibliothek, MS 130 E 4 (Book of Hours)
- The Hague, Koninklijke Bibliothek, MS 130 E 5 (Book of Hours)
- The Hague, Koninklijke Bibliothek, MS 130 E 18 (Book of Hours)
- The Hague, Koninklijke Bibliothek, MS 130 E 19 (Book of Hours)
- The Hague, Koninklijke Bibliothek, MS 131 G 1 (Book of Hours)
- The Hague, Koninklijke Bibliothek, MS 131 G 3 (Book of Hours)
- The Hague, Koninklijke Bibliothek, MS 131 G 4 (Book of Hours)
- The Hague, Koninklijke Bibliothek, MS 131 G 5 (Book of Hours)
- The Hague, Koninklijke Bibliothek, MS 131 G 7 (Book of Hours)
- The Hague, Koninklijke Bibliothek, MS 131 G 8 (Book of Hours)
- The Hague, Koninklijke Bibliothek, MS 131 G 41 (Book of Hours)
- The Hague, Koninklijke Bibliothek, MS 131 H 8 (Book of Hours)
- The Hague, Koninklijke Bibliothek, MS 131 H 9 (Book of Hours)
- The Hague, Koninklijke Bibliothek, MS 131 H 11 (Book of Hours)
- The Hague, Koninklijke Bibliothek, MS 131 H 18 (Book of Hours)
- The Hague, Koninklijke Bibliothek, MS 131 H 25 (Book of Hours)
- The Hague, Koninklijke Bibliothek, MS 132 G 37 (Book of Hours)
- The Hague, Koninklijke Bibliothek, MS 132 G 38 (Book of Hours)
- The Hague, Koninklijke Bibliothek, MS 133 D 1 (Book of Hours)
- The Hague, Koninklijke Bibliothek, MS 133 D 5 (Book of Hours)
- The Hague, Koninklijke Bibliothek, MS 133 D 6 (Book of Hours)
- The Hague, Koninklijke Bibliothek, MS 133 D 7 (Book of Hours)
- The Hague, Koninklijke Bibliothek, MS 133 D 14 (Book of Hours)
- The Hague, Koninklijke Bibliothek, MS 133 D 15 (Book of Hours)
- The Hague, Koninklijke Bibliothek, MS 133 D 16 (Book of Hours)
- The Hague, Koninklijke Bibliothek, MS 133 D 17 (Book of Hours)
- The Hague, Koninklijke Bibliothek, MS 133 D 18 (Book of Hours)
- The Hague, Koninklijke Bibliothek, MS 133 E 11 (Book of Hours)
- The Hague, Koninklijke Bibliothek, MS 133 E 12 (Book of Hours)
- The Hague, Koninklijke Bibliothek, MS 133 E 15 (Book of Hours)
- The Hague, Koninklijke Bibliothek, MS 133 E 16 (Book of Hours)
- The Hague, Koninklijke Bibliothek, MS 133 E 17 (Book of Hours)
- The Hague, Koninklijke Bibliothek, MS 133 E 18 (Book of Hours)
- The Hague, Koninklijke Bibliothek, MS 133 E 19 (Book of Hours)
- The Hague, Koninklijke Bibliothek, MS 133 E 22 (Book of Hours)
- The Hague, Koninklijke Bibliothek, MS 133 H 16 (Book of Hours)
- The Hague, Koninklijke Bibliothek, MS 133 H 30 (Book of Hours)
- The Hague, Koninklijke Bibliothek, MS 133 H 31 (Book of Hours)
- The Hague, Koninklijke Bibliothek, MS 133 M 23 (Book of Hours)
- The Hague, Koninklijke Bibliothek, MS 133 M 82 (Book of Hours)
- The Hague, Koninklijke Bibliothek, MS 133 M 124 (Book of Hours)
- The Hague, Koninklijke Bibliothek, MS 133 M 131 (Book of Hours)
- The Hague, Koninklijke Bibliothek, MS 135 C 4 (Book of Hours)
- The Hague, Koninklijke Bibliothek, MS 135 E 12 (Book of Hours)
- The Hague, Koninklijke Bibliothek, MS 135 E 18 (Book of Hours)
- The Hague, Koninklijke Bibliothek, MS 135 E 22 (Book of Hours and Prayer Book)
- The Hague, Koninklijke Bibliothek, MS 135 E 23 (Book of Hours)
- The Hague, Koninklijke Bibliothek, MS 135 E 25 (Book of Hours)
- The Hague, Koninklijke Bibliothek, MS 135 E 36 (Book of Hours)
- The Hague, Koninklijke Bibliothek, MS 135 E 40 (Book of Hours)
- The Hague, Koninklijke Bibliothek, MS 135 E 45 (Book of Hours)
- The Hague, Koninklijke Bibliothek, MS 135 F 2 (Book of Hours)
- The Hague, Koninklijke Bibliothek, MS 135 G 9 (Book of Hours)
- The Hague, Koninklijke Bibliothek, MS 135 G 10 (Book of Hours)
- The Hague, Koninklijke Bibliothek, MS 135 G 19 (Book of Hours)
- The Hague, Koninklijke Bibliothek, MS 135 J 9 (Book of Hours)
- The Hague, Koninklijke Bibliothek, MS 135 J 10 (Book of Hours)
- The Hague, Koninklijke Bibliothek, MS 135 J 50 (Book of Hours)
- The Hague, Koninklijke Bibliothek, MS 135 J 55 (Book of Hours)
- The Hague, Koninklijke Bibliothek, MS 135 K 11 (Book of Hours)
- The Hague, Koninklijke Bibliothek, MS 135 K 15 (Book of Hours)
- The Hague, Koninklijke Bibliothek, MS 135 K 17 (Book of Hours)
- The Hague, Koninklijke Bibliothek, MS 135 K 40 (Book of Hours)
- The Hague, Koninklijke Bibliothek, MS 135 K 45 (Book of Hours)
- The Hague, Musee Meermanno-Westreenianum, MS 10 E 2 (Book of Hours)
- The Hague, Musee Meermanno-Westreenianum, MS 10 E 47 (Book of Hours)
- The Hague, Musee Meermanno-Westreenianum, MS 10 F 1 (Book of Hours)
- The Hague, Musee Meermanno-Westreenianum, MS 10 F 2 (Book of Hours)
- The Hague, Musee Meermanno-Westreenianum, MS 10 F 3 (Book of Hours)
- The Hague, Musee Meermanno-Westreenianum, MS 10 F 5 (Book of Hours)
- The Hague, Musee Meermanno-Westreenianum, MS 10 F 11 (Book of Hours)
- The Hague, Musee Meermanno-Westreenianum, MS 10 F 12 (Book of Hours)
- The Hague, Musee Meermanno-Westreenianum, MS 10 F 13 (Book of Hours)
- The Hague, Musee Meermanno-Westreenianum, MS 10 F 17 (Book of Hours)
- The Hague, Musee Meermanno-Westreenianum, MS 10 F 20 (Book of Hours)
- The Hague, Musee Meermanno-Westreenianum, MS 10 F 23 (Book of Hours)
- The Hague, Musee Meermanno-Westreenianum, MS 10 F 50 (Book of Hours)
- London, British Library, Add MS 18850 (Bedford Hours)
- London, British Library, Add MS 28962 (Psalter and Hours of Alphonso V of Aragon)
- London, British Library, Add MS 34294, 1-4 (Sforza Hours)
- London, British Library, Add MS 38126 (Huth Hours)
- London, British Library, Add MS 42131 (Psalter and Hours of John, Duke of Bedford)
- London, British Library, Add MS 50001 (Hours of Elizabeth the Queen)
- London, British Library, Add MS 50002 (Mirandola Hours)
- London, British Library, Add MS 54782 (London Hours of William Lord Hastings (Hastings Hours))
- London, British Library, Egerton MS 1070 (Egerton Hours)
- London, British Library, Royal MS 2 A. XVIII (Beaufort/Beauchamp Hours)
- London, British Library, Yates Thompson MS 3 (Hours of Jean Dunois)
- London, British Library, Yates Thompson MS 4 (Hours of Jacob de Bregilles)
- London, British Library, Yates Thompson MS 23 (Hours of Agostino Biliotti)
- Milan, Biblioteca Trivulziana, Cod. 470 Book of Hours (Book of Hours (Milan, Biblioteca Trivulziana, Cod. 470))
- New York, Morgan Library & Museum, MS M. 893 (Psalter and Hours of Henry Beauchamp, Earl of Warwick)
- New York, Morgan Library & Museum, M. 945 and M. 917 (Hours of Catherine of Cleves)
- Paris, Bibliothèque nationale MS lat. 1158 (Neville Hours)
- Paris, Bibliothèque nationale, MS lat. 9471 (Grandes Heures du Duc de Rohan)
- Paris, Bibliothèque nationale, MS lat. 919 (Les Grandes Heures du duc de Berry)
- Rennes, Les Champs Libres, Rennes Métropole, Ms. 1834 (Hours of Jean de Montauban)
- Saint Petersburg, Russian National Library, Hours of Maria Stuart
- Syracuse University Library, Special Collections Research Center, MS 2 (Le Louchier Hours) or (The Syracuse Hours)
- Syracuse University Library, Special Collections Research Center, MS 3 (Book of Hours)
- Syracuse University Library, Special Collections Research Center, MS 6 (Book of Hours)
- Uppsala, Uppsala University Library, C 517 e (Ravenelle Hours)

=== Book of Hours and Prayer Book ===
- The Hague, Koninklijke Bibliothek, 134 C 47 (Book of Hours and Prayer Book)
- The Hague, Koninklijke Bibliothek, 135 F 4 (Book of Hours and Prayer Book)
- The Hague, Koninklijke Bibliothek, 135 G 12 (Book of Hours and Prayer Book)
- The Hague, Musee Meermanno-Westreenianum, 10 F 15 (Book of Hours and Prayer Book)

=== Prayer Books ===
- The Hague, Koninklijke Bibliothek, KA 31 (Prayer Book)
- The Hague, Koninklijke Bibliothek, 71 H 56 (Prayer Book)
- The Hague, Koninklijke Bibliothek, 71 H 64 (Prayer Book)
- The Hague, Koninklijke Bibliothek, 74 G 1 (Prayer Book)
- The Hague, Koninklijke Bibliothek, MS 76 G 15 (Prayer Book)
- The Hague, Koninklijke Bibliothek, 130 E 14 (Prayer Book)
- The Hague, Koninklijke Bibliothek, 130 E 17 (Prayer Book)
- The Hague, Koninklijke Bibliothek, 133 D 10 (Prayer Book)
- The Hague, Koninklijke Bibliothek, 133 F 3 (Prayer Book)
- The Hague, Koninklijke Bibliothek, 133 F 6 (Prayer Book)
- The Hague, Koninklijke Bibliothek, 133 F 9 (Prayer Book)
- The Hague, Koninklijke Bibliothek, 135 E 19 (Prayer Book)
- The Hague, Musee Meermanno-Westreenianum, 10 E 1 (Prayer Book)
- The Hague, Musee Meermanno-Westreenianum, 10 F 22 (Prayer Book)

=== Liturgical manuscripts ===
- Aix, MS 11 (Missal)
- Alnwick Castle, Collection of the Duke of Northumberland (Sherborne Missal)
- Avallon, MS 1 (Missal)
- Baltimore, Walters Art Museum, MS W 75 (Masters of the Dark Eyes Missal)
- Brussels, Bibliothèque royale, MS 3452 (Breviary of Hugues Dobois)
- Fribourg, Bibliothèque Cantonale et Universitaire, MS L. 64 (Breviary)
- The Hague, Koninklijke Bibliothek, 70 E 12 (Lectionary with Gospel and Epistle lessons, glossed)
- The Hague, Koninklijke Bibliothek, 74 G 33 (Diurnal)
- The Hague, Koninklijke Bibliothek, 75 A 2 / 6 (Antiphonary)
- The Hague, Koninklijke Bibliothek, 76 D 14 (Missal)
- The Hague, Koninklijke Bibliothek, 76 E 2 (Missal)
- The Hague, Koninklijke Bibliothek, 76 E 8 (Breviary)
- The Hague, Koninklijke Bibliothek, 76 E 18 (Mass and Office Book of the Brotherhood of St. Catherine of the Paris)
- The Hague, Koninklijke Bibliothek, 78 A 34 (Fragments of liturgical manuscripts)
- The Hague, Koninklijke Bibliothek, 78 D 44 (Missal of the Church of St. Servatius, Maastricht)
- The Hague, Koninklijke Bibliothek, 78 J 47 (Lay Breviary)
- The Hague, Koninklijke Bibliothek, 128 D 29 (Missal)
- The Hague, Koninklijke Bibliothek, 128 D 30 (Festal Missal)
- The Hague, Koninklijke Bibliothek, 133 E 8 (Diurnal)
- The Hague, Koninklijke Bibliothek, 134 C 60 (Psalter and Breviary of St. Bridget)
- The Hague, Koninklijke Bibliothek, 135 H 45 (Missal)
- The Hague, Koninklijke Bibliothek, 135 J 8 (Diurnal)
- London, British Library, Add MS 17440 (Missal)
- London, British Library, Add MS 18851 (Breviary of Isabella of Castile)
- London, British Library, Add MS 35311 (Breviary of John the Fearless)
- Oxford, Bodleian Library, MS Digby 227 (Abingdon Missal)
- Ranworth, St. Helen's Church, s. n. (Ranworth Antiphoner)

=== Pentateuchs ===
- London, British Library, Or. 2348 (Hebrew Pentateuch)

=== Bestiaries ===
- Zirc, Országos Széchényi Könyvtár, Cod. Lat. 506

=== Bibles ===
- Auckland, New Zealand, Public Library, MS G. 128-31 (Bible)
- Brussels, Bibliothèque royale, MSS 106, 107, 204 and 205 (Bible)
- Darmstadt, Staatsbibliothek, MS 324 (Bible of Thomas à Kempis)
- Florence, Biblioteca Medicea Laurenziana, Plut. 15. 17 (Bible of Matthias Corvinus)
- London, British Library, Add MS 10043 and 38122 (Bible of Herman van Lochorst)
- Modena, Biblioteca Estense, VG 12 Lat. (422–23) (Bible of Borsso d'Este)

=== Bible Historiales ===
- London, British Library, Royal MS 15 D I (Bible Historiale of Edward IV)

=== Chaucer ===
- Aberystwyth, National Library of Wales (Hengwrt manuscript)
- Cambridge, Corpus Christi College, MS 61 (Corpus Troilus)
- London, British Library, Add MS 35286 (Chaucer, Canterbury Tales)
- San Marino, California, Huntington Library, EL 26 C 9 (Ellesmere Chaucer)

=== Psalters ===
- Aberdeen, Aberdeen University Library, MS 25 (Burnet Psalter)

=== Miscellanies ===
- Barcelona, Biblioteca Universitària de Barcelona, MS 75 (Miscellany)
- Bamberg, Bamberg State Library, Msc.Theol.233 (Bamberg Miscellany)
- London, British Library, Add MS 8784 (Miscellany)

=== Welsh ===
- Aberystwyth, National Library of Wales, MS 7006D (The Black Book of Basingwerk)

=== Cicero ===
- Berlin, Staatsbibliothek Preußischer Kulturbesitz, MS Hamilton 166 (Cicero, Epistolae ad Atticum)

=== Apocalypse manuscripts ===
- Cambrai, Bibliothèque municipale, MS 386 (Cambrai Apocalypse)
- London, British Library, Add MS 38121 (Apocalypse & Life of John)
- Paris, Bibliothèque nationale de France, Néerlandais 3 (Flemish Apocalypse)

=== Chronicles ===
- Budapest, Országos Széchényi Könyvtár, (Epitoma Rerum Hungaricarum)
- Cambridge, Trinity Hall, MS 1 (Thomas of Elmham, Chronicles of St. Augustine's Abbey, Canterbury)
- Chantilly, Musée Condé, MS 1389 (Bidpai, Fables)
- Paris, Bibliothèque nationale MS Fr. 2643-6 (Froissart of Louis of Gruuthuse (BnF Fr 2643-6) Froissart, Chronicles)
- Saint Petersburg, Russian National Library, Grands Chroniques de France by Simon Marmion
- Saint Petersburg, Library of the Russian Academy of Sciences, (Radzivill Chronicle)
- San Marino, California, Huntington Library, HM 113 (Brut Chronicle)

=== Albertus Magnus ===
- Eton, Eton College, Library, MS 44 (Albertus Magnus, Commentary on Saints Luke and Mark)

=== Quintilian ===
- Florence, Biblioteca Medicea Laurenziana, MS 46. 13 (Quintilian)

=== Livy ===
- Florence, Biblioteca Medicea Laurenziana, MS Plut. 63. 12. (Livy, Ab Urbe Conditia)

=== Coluccio ===
- Florence, Biblioteca Medicea Laurenziana, MS Strozzi. 36 (Coluccio)

=== Eusebius of Caesarea ===
- Geneva, Bibliothèque Publique et Universitaire, MS lat. 49 (Eusebius of Caesarea, De Temporibus)

=== Duns Scotus ===
- London, British Library, Add MS 15272 (Duns Scotus, On the Sentences)

=== Julius Caesar ===
- London, British Library, Add MS 16982 (Caesar)

=== John Mandeville ===
- London, British Library, Add MS 24189 (Travels of Sir John Mandeville)

=== Virgil ===
- Florence, Biblioteca Riccardiana, MS 492 (Virgil, Works)
- London, British Library, King's MS 24 (The King's Virgil)

=== Romances ===
- London, British Library, Royal MS 15 E VI (Talbot Shrewsbury Book of Romances)
- London, British Library, Add MS 10290 (London Jason)

=== Fechtbücher ===
- Fiore dei Liberi, Fior di Battaglia
  - New York, Morgan Library & Museum, MS M.383
  - Los Angeles, J. Paul Getty Museum, MS LUDWIG XV 13
  - Italy, Pisani-Dossi collection, Pisani-Dossi MS (Flos Duellatorum)
  - Paris, Bibliothèque nationale de France, MSS LATIN 11269
- Augsburg, University Library, I.6.4.2 (Codex Wallerstein)
- Krajow, Biblioteka Jagiellonski (Gladiatoria)
- ?, Bibliotheca dell'Academica Nazionale dei Lincei e Corsiniana, Cod. 1449 (Cod. 44 A 8)

=== Chani da Castello ===
- London, British Library, Egerton MS 1866 (Chani da Castello, Libro Imperiale)

=== St. Benedict ===
- London, British Library, Add MS 30078 (Rule of St. Benedict)

=== Roman satires ===
- San Marino, California, Huntington Library, HM 50 (Satires of Juvenal and Persius)

=== Hagiography ===
- Malta, Bibljoteka Nazzjonali ta' Malta (Malta Life of St. Anthony the Abbot)
- Florence, Biblioteca Laurenziana, MS Laur. Med. Pal. 143 (Florence Life of St. Anthony the Abbot)
- Paris, Bibliothèque de l'Arsenal, MS 940 (Life and Passion of St. Maurice)
- San Marino, California, Huntington Library, HM 55 (Capgrave, Life of St. Norbert)

=== Ovid, trans. Octavien de Saint Gelais ===
- San Marino, California, Huntington Library, HM 60 (Epitres D’Ovide, trans. Octavien de Saint Gelais)

=== Alexandria ===
- Sofia, Bulgaria, Narodna Biblioteka Sv. Sv. Kiril i Metodii (Alexandria of Sofia Codex)

=== Gospel Books ===
- Moscow, Rossiiskaya Gosudarstvennaya Biblioteka, (Khitrovo Gospel)
- Athens, Greece, Ethnike Bibliotheke tes Hellados, Codex 2603 (Gospel Book)

=== Philostratos ===
- Budapest, Országos Széchényi Könyvtár, Cod. Lat. 417 (Philostratus Corvina)

=== Music manuscripts ===
- Eton, Eton College MS. 178 (Eton Choirbook)
- Vatican City, Apostolic Library, Chigiana, C. VIII. 234 (Chigi codex)
- Florence, Biblioteca Medicea Laurenziana, Med. Pal. 87 (Squarcialupi codex)

=== Aurora consurgens ===
- Glasgow, University Library MS. Ferguson 6
- Zurich, Zentralbibliothek, MS. Rhenoviensis 172
- Leiden, Universiteitsbibliotheek, VCF 29
- Paris, Bibliothèque nationale, MS. Parisinus Latinus 14006
- Prague, Universitni Knihovna, MS. VI. Fd. 26
- Prague, Chapitre Métropolitain, MS. 1663. O. LXXIX
- Berlin, Staatsbibliothek Preußischer Kulturbesitz, MS. Germ. qu. 848

=== St. Augustine ===
- New York Public Library, Spencer Collection MS 30 (Augustine, City of God)

=== Johannes von Tepl ===
- Heidelberg, Universitätsbibliothek Heidelberg, Cod. Pal. germ. 76 (Johannes von Tepl, Der Ackermann aus Böhmen)

=== Dante ===
- London, British Library, Yates Thompson MS 36 (Dante, Divine Comedy)
- Vatican City, Biblioteca Apostolica, Urb. Lat. 365 (Dante, Divine Comedy)

=== Pseudo-Lull ===
- Florence, Biblioteca Nazionale, BR 52 (Pseudo-Lull, Alchemical treatises)

=== Suetonius ===
- Paris, Bibliothèque nationale, cod. lat. 5814 (Suetonius, Lives of the Twelve Caesars)

=== Johannes de Deo ===
- Vienna, Österreichische Nationalbibliothek, Cod. 1591 (Johannes de Deo, Columba)

=== De sphera ===
- Modena, Biblioteca Estense, α. 2. 14 (Lat. 209) (De sphera)

=== Engineering ===
- Mariano Taccola, De machinis
  - Codex latinus monacensis 28800 Bayerische Staatsbibliothek, München,
  - MS 136 in the Spencer Collection New York Public Library,
  - Codex latinus 2941 in the Bibliotheca Nazionale Marciana, Venezia.
- Paolo Santini or Paulus Savetinus Ducensis copy of Taccola work, De re militari et de machinis bellicis Codex latinus 7239 in the Bibliothèque nationale, Paris,
- Mariano Taccola, De ingeneis
  - Codex latinus monacensis 197 Bayerische Staatsbibliothek München;
  - Add MS 34113 in the British Library, London
  - Codex Santini in the Collection of Avv. Santini, Urbino
  - Ms. Palatino 766 (BNCF)

=== Vexillology ===
- Banderia Prutenorum

== 16th century ==
- New York, collection of Mickey Cartin (Augsburg Book of Miracles)
- Saint Petersburg, Saltykov-Schedrin Public Library (Life of Alexander Nevsky)

=== Books of Hours ===
- Dunedin, Public Library, Reed Collection, MS 8 (Book of Hours)
- London, British Library, Yates Thompson MS 18 (Psalter of Henry VIII)
- The Hague, Musee Meermanno-Westreenianum, MS 10. F. 33 (Hours of Jehan de Luc)
- London, British Library, Add MS 18852 (Hours of Joanna of Castile (Hours of Joanna the Mad))
- London, British Library, Add MS 18853 (Hours of Francis I)
- London, British Library, Add MS 20927 (Stuart de Rothesay Hours)
- London, British Library, Add MS 24098 Fragmentary Book of Hours (Golf Book)
- London, British Library, Add MS 35319 (Egmont Hours)
- London, British Library, Royal MS 2 B XV (Book of Hours)
- London, British Library, Yates Thompson MS 5 (Tilliot Hours)
- London, British Library, Yates Thompson MS 7 (Hours of Dionora of Urbino)
- London, British Library, Yates Thompson MS 29 (Hours of Bonaparte Ghislieri)
- London, British Library, Yates Thompson MS 30 (Hours of Laudomia de' Medici)
- San Marino, California, Huntington Library, HM 48 (Book of Hours)
- Syracuse University Library, Special Collections Research Center, MS 7 (Book of Hours)
- Vatican City, Biblioteca Apostolica, Vat. Ross. 94 (Book of Hours)

=== Liturgical manuscripts ===
- Cambridge, Massachusetts, Harvard College, Houghton Library, pfms. Lat. 186 (Graduall)

=== Prayerbooks ===
- Antwerp, Museum Mayer van den Bergh, Mayer van den Bergh Breviary
- London, British Library, Add MS 15281 (Prayerbook of Sigismund I of Poland)

=== Law codes ===
- London, British Library, Add MS 10142 (Ancient Laws of Denmark)

=== Traicte de Peyne ===
- San Marino, California, Huntington Library, HM 49 (Traicte de Peyne)

=== Geography ===
- __________ early sixteenth-century to Niccolaus Germanus' manuscript codes Parisinus Latinus 4801
- _________BNF_______Codex Latinus Parisinus 4802, which has Jacopo del Massaio's 1428 maps illustrating Jacopo Angeli da Scarperia's 1408-9 Latin translation of Ptolemy's Geographia.
- Sophia, Bulgaria, Narodna Biblioteka Sv. Sv. Kiril i Metodii, OR 3198, fol. 250v-251r (Muhammad b. Muhammad al-Idrîsî, Book of Pleasant Journeys into Faraway Lands (Book of Roger))

=== Alchemy ===
- Prague, Národní knihovna Ceské republiky, Griemiller z Trebska, Jaroš Rosarium philosophorum

=== Herbals ===
- London, British Library, Add MS 22332 (Mattioli's Dioscorides illustrated by Cibo)

=== Gospel Books ===
- Kiev, Natsional'na biblioteka Ukraïny, im. V. I. Vernadskoho, (Peresopnytsya Gospel)
- Paris, Bibliothèque nationale, MS syr. 344 (Nestorian Evangelion)

=== Psalters ===
- Copenhagen, Royal Library, GKS 1605 4°

=== Guillaume de Lorris and Jean de Meun ===
- New York, The Morgan Library & Museum, MS M.948 (The Roman de la Rose of François I)

=== Book of unknown contents ===
- New Haven, Connecticut, Yale University, Beinecke Rare Book Library, MS 408 (Voynich manuscript)

=== Diatessaron ===
- Florence, Biblioteca Medicea Laurenziana, orient. 81 (Persian Diatessaron)

== 17th century ==
=== Ardašīr Book ===
- Tübingen, Universitätsbibliothek, Ms. Or. qu. 1680 (Ardašīr Book)

=== Paisios Hagiopostolites ===
- London, British Library, Add MS 8238 (Paisios Hagiopostolites, Verse History of Mount Sinai and its environs (London, British Library, Add MS 8238))

=== Slujebnicul Arhieresc al Mitropolitului Stefan al Ungrovlahiei ===
- Bucharest, National Academy Library (BAR, ms. ROM. 1790; sec. XVII <1661, Tara Romaneasca; Paper, 114 f.280/190 mm.. Text with black and red ink. Illuminated, majuscule, frontispicii in colour and gold)
- Estera Hebrew Meghi'lat Esther (Estera).
- Bucharest, National Academy Library (Ester - BAR ms. oriental 405, 1673 Moldova, pergament, roll 1750/173 mm. Ebraic text aschenaz with black ink. Flowered frames and anthropomorphic decorations in red, green, blue and yellow.)

=== Vaticinia de Summis Pontificibus ===
- Rome, Italy; Biblioteca Nazionale Centrale (Castro Pretorio). Dipartimento Manoscritti Antichi e Rari. Fondo Vittorio Emmanuele 307 (Vaticinia de Futuri Christi Vicarii ad Cesarem Filium; 1629. 82 pages sewed as a codex. Brought by Cèzar de Nostre-Dame to cardinal Maffeo Barberini) It comprises 80 drawings and/or watercolored images that some book authors link to Catholic Popes in the future. There are several images with probable astrological (astronomical dating) that are very cryptic. Only ten images are commented by handwriting in Latin (seem added by a later interpreter) the other are silent.

== 18th century ==
- Erotocrit-ul from Vincenzo Cornaro,
- Bucharest, National Academy Library (BAR ms ROM. 3514; 1787 Tara Romaneasca; 219 f.; 275/195 mm. Text with black ink. Titles and initials with red ink. Ms illuminated from Petrache logofatul)

== 19th century ==
- Book of kings
- Bucharest, National Academy Library (BAR, Ms. oriental nr.333, Ferdousi; Sah-name "Cartea regilor- Book of kings", sec. XIX, paper; 573 f.; 360/220 mm. ta'lik writing. Text on patru four columns in red frame. The manuscript has 77 de miniatures with hunting scenes, fighting scenes or regal palace interiors. The manuscript was Gh. Valentin Bibescu collection)
- Illuminated Books and Prophecies by William Blake

== 21st century ==
- Saint John's Bible

== See also ==
- List of manuscripts
- List of codices
- Lists of books
- Byzantine illuminated manuscripts
- Book of Job in Byzantine Illuminated Manuscripts
