= Charioteer Papyrus =

5th-century papyrus fragment

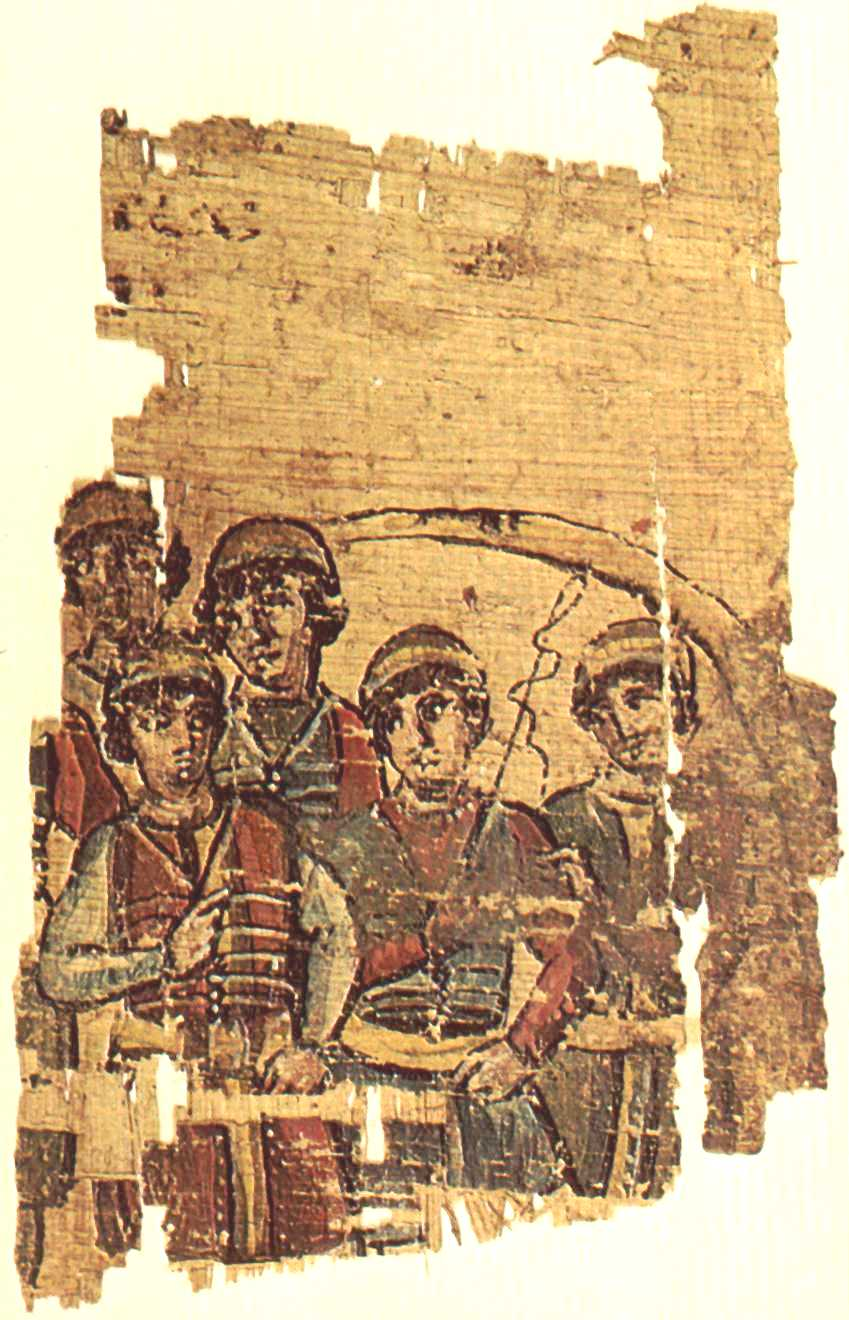
The Charioteer Papyrus

The Charioteer Papyrus (London, Egypt Exploration Society, s.n.) is a 5th-century fragment of an illustration from an unknown work of literature. It is one of the finest surviving fragments of ancient book illustration. Unlike other surviving illustrated fragments of papyrus, such as the Romance Papyrus and the Heracles Papyrus, which have illustrations that are little more than mere sketches, the Charioteer Papyrus is sensitively drawn and finely colored. It shows portions of six charioteers in the red or green tunics of their factions. It is unlikely that it served as an illustration for the chariot race at the games at the funeral of Patroclus in the Iliad, since the number of charioteers is wrong.

It undoubtedly served an illustration for a literary work and was once bound as a codex. There are only a few letters of text on the illustrated side of the fragment, but on the back are the first letters of thirteen lines of writing. The text has been identified as part of the Alexander Romance. The language and alphabet are Greek, and the style might indicate an origin in Egypt.
