= León Bible of 920 =

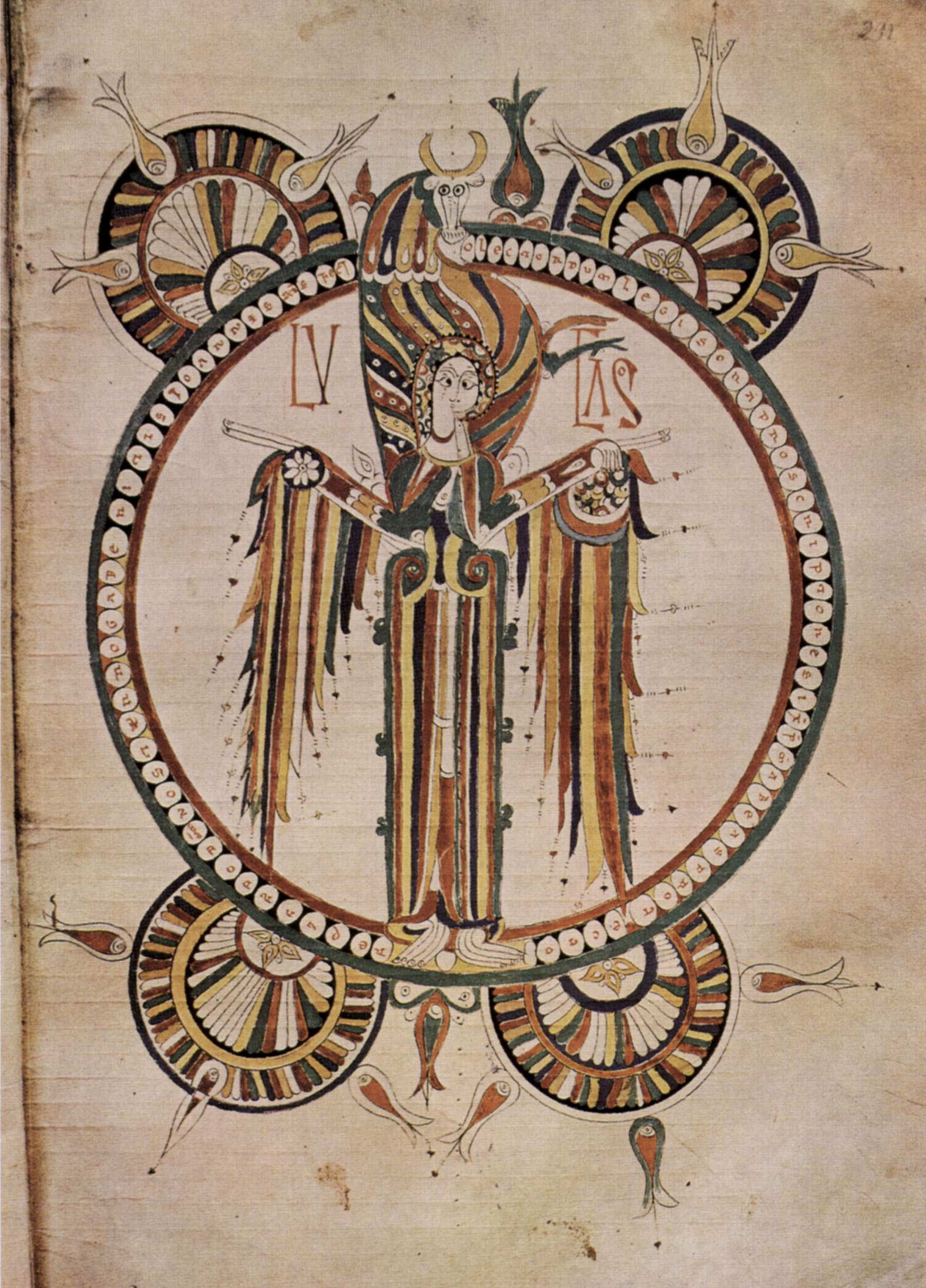
Miniature of an angel, symbol of saint Luke (f. 211).

The León Bible of 920 is a manuscript bible copied and illuminated in 920 in a monastery in the Province of León in Spain. It is also known as the John and Vimara Bible or the Holy Bible of León. It is now held as codex 6 in the library of León Cathedral and is one of the most important manuscripts of the Spanish High Middle Ages.

It was edited by abbot Maurus and produced by the copyist and illuminator 'Ioannes' (John) under the supervision of a monk called Vimara.

== Bibliography ==
- John Williams, Imaging the Early Medieval Bible, Penn State Press, 1999, 227 p. (ISBN 9780271017686, pp. 181–183
