= Escorial Beatus =

10th-century illuminated manuscript

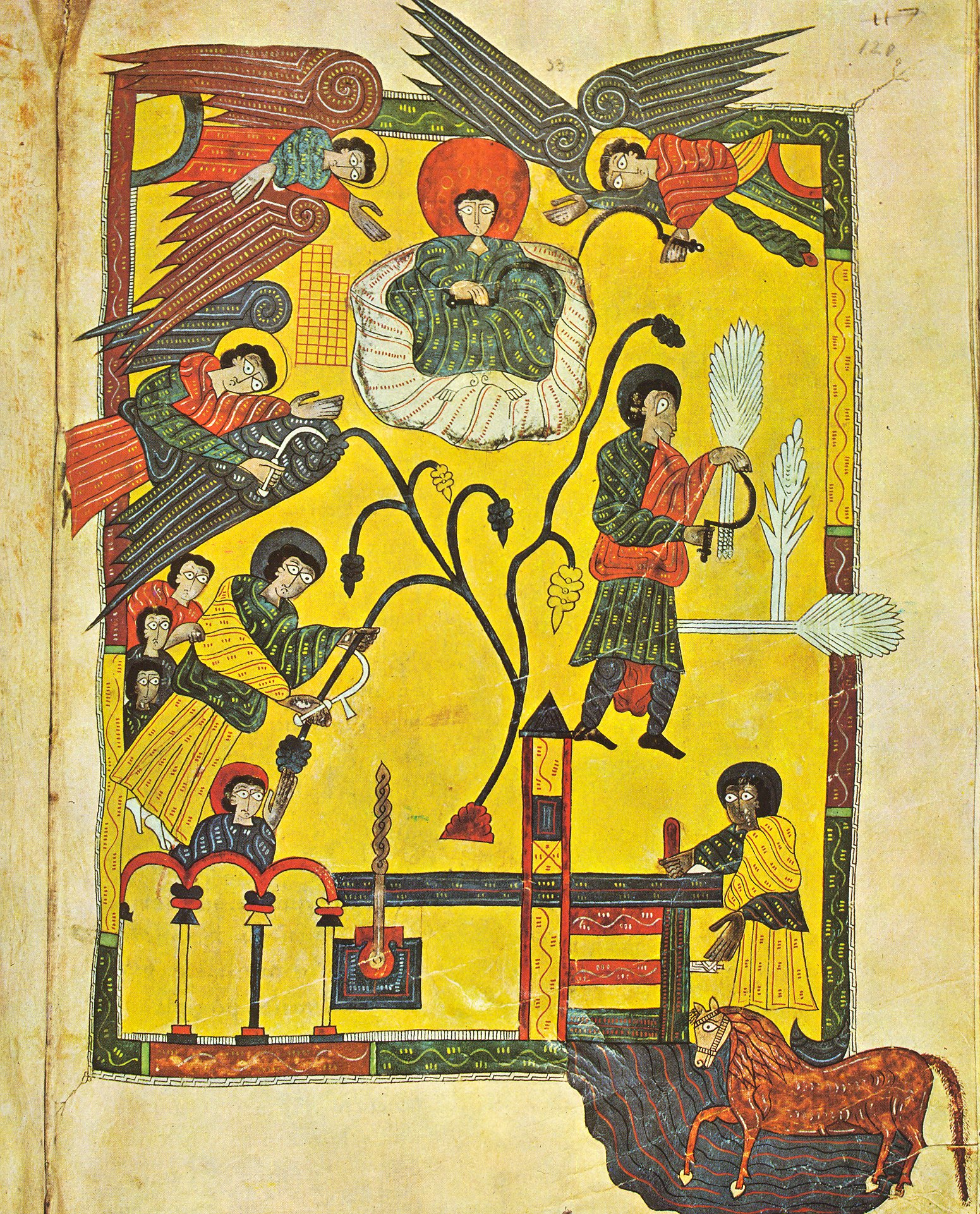
Folio 12 recto of the Escorial Beatus, the great winepress of God.

The Escorial Beatus (Escorial, Biblioteca Monasterio, Cod. & II. 5) is a 10th-century illuminated manuscript of the Commentary on the Apocalypse by Beatus of Liébana. The manuscript was probably created at the monastery at San Millán de la Cogolla. There are 151 extant folios which measure 395mm by 225mm. The manuscript is illustrated with 52 surviving miniatures. Of the original illustrations within the commentary, twenty-seven of the original illustrations are left. Compared to other illuminated manuscripts, including other illuminated manuscripts at the time, the Escorial Beatus is slightly smaller in comparison. The Escorial Beatus is one of the most well-known illuminated manuscripts that makes use of the Mozarabic style of art. This would later lead to influencing other well known artistic styles, including styles like Romanesque and Carolingian.

== History ==
The origins of the Escorial Beatus are most often linked to the site of San Millán de la Cogolla, based on sixteenth century records confirming at the very least, that it was in San Millán at that time. Most manuscripts at San Millán de la Cogolla would later be moved to the Real Academia de la Historia in the nineteenth century. However, Escorial Beatus was instead found in the library of the Escorial in the sixteenth century.

=== Text ===
The first version of the Commentary on the Apocalypse was finished in the year 776. Between the years 784 and 786, Beatus revised both the commentary and the illuminations. His reasoning for revising the commentary and illuminations is not known. Beatus of Liébana believed that illuminations were an essential part of the experience when reading a manuscript. As a result, the text within the manuscript and the visual illuminations were meant to be interpreted together as a part of a whole, and not individually. In his writings, he elaborated further on what was the proper way to interact with manuscript and scriptures, and they have literal, metaphorical, and spiritual ways to interact with manuscripts. The addition of illuminations to his manuscript were thus a very deliberate decision, and he believed that by having the illuminations, it further visualizes the events of The Revelation in his Commentary of the Apocalypse. All together, the text of the manuscript and the illustrations unify Beatus's religious ideas.

=== Artist and author ===
The illuminations are believed to have been the work of a single, experienced illuminator, and it is likely that the text was written at the same time the illuminations were produced. The images together with the text are crowded and densely packed together. Within several of the illuminations and miniatures, the text and inscriptions in the margins actually overlap with the illuminations themselves. In a few pages, the margins outside the illuminations are almost completely full of inscriptions, and because of this overlap between text and illuminations, some of the text cannot be clearly read.

However, there are a few instances in which the text does not necessarily correspond with the imagery in the illuminations. Although the reason behind this is not fully understood, it is possible that the text had already existed, but the illuminator did not read it. Although the text and illuminations may have been produced together at the same time, this discrepancy suggests that the illuminator was not the scribe. The actual scribe likely wrote the inscriptions in the margins to provide an index to the proper subject for the illuminator.

=== Provenance and condition ===
At some point in time in its history, the Escorial Beatus was rebound, but it was rebound carelessly. As a result, the original beginning and original ending pages have been lost. More than a dozen illustrations have also been lost. Although there are pages that have been lost, the Escorial Beatus remains a good example of a Mozarabic style illuminated manuscript.

== Style ==
The Escorial Beatus is similar stylistically to other works that were from San Millán de la Cogolla. For example, the way that human faces are illustrated in the Escorial Beatus is similar to another manuscript that is also believed to be from San Millán de la Cogolla. However, at the same time, there is no text or evidence within the manuscript itself that explicitly states its place of origin. Although the Escorial Beatus would later be found at the Library of the Escorial, its style does not resemble that of other works that are also found there.

The illuminations of the manuscript show similarities in style to those produced by Florentius, the artist responsible for a copy of the Moralia in Job of Pope Gregory I (Madrid, Biblioteca Nacional, Cod. 80).

Earlier copies of the Beatus Commentary were different in visual style, and did not have many of the traits that would be associated with the Mozarabic style. It did not have characteristics such as the wide eyes, the banded backgrounds, nor the patterning or posing associated with the Mozarabic style, which is one of the features the Escorial Beatus is most known for.

The Escorial Beatus provides a good example of the Mozarabic style of art. Unlike other manuscripts that were found with the Escorial Beatus, the way that drapery and clothing folds are rendered are almost completely flat. The Escorial Beatus is an example of the anti-plastic style, which is associated with the Mozarabic school. In other manuscripts, the "plastic" style refers to the specific manner in which drapery and clothing folds are rendered, in a tubular fashion. However, the Escorial Beatus is rendered in a notably flat style.

The Mozarabic style of art takes its inspiration from Africa, Islamic, and North European artistic traditions. This exposure to Islamic tradition stems from when the Arabs invaded the Iberian Peninsula in the year 711. The Christians who were already living in the Iberian Peninsula then adopted different traditions from Islamic styles, including motifs, form and style.

These influences would contribute to the Mozarabic style, which would then go on to influence Romanesque and Carolingian styles. As a result, the Escorial Beatus links these various styles together. Mozarabic is a style that is not limited to just religious illuminations and illustrations, but the Mozarabic style can be found in textiles, ceramics, and even architecture. However, by the year 1110, the Mozarabic style was dying in popularity, then leaving the Romanesque style of art to flourish in Spain.

== Imagery, iconography and symbolism ==
Compared to other illuminated manuscripts, it is considered to be quite decorated. The elements within the images are densely packed together. The frames of the illuminations are quite decorated, and the work makes use of dark colors, patterning, and yellow backgrounds. The style of Escorial Beatus is very flat, with very opaque colors.

The imagery of the illuminations is taken from tales in the Bible, although most notably, there are illustrations, with accompanying commentary, depicting the apocalypse. Many of these illustrations depict the Revelation, which Beatus had felt was essential in understanding the Bible as a whole. The first illumination depicts Adam and Eve, while the last illumination depicts Daniel.

Beatus of Liébana likely had knowledge of other commentaries and their illuminations, as the illuminations in Escorial Beatus resemble the style and picture found in commentaries like the Daniel Commentary.
