= Psalter (GKS 1605 4°) =

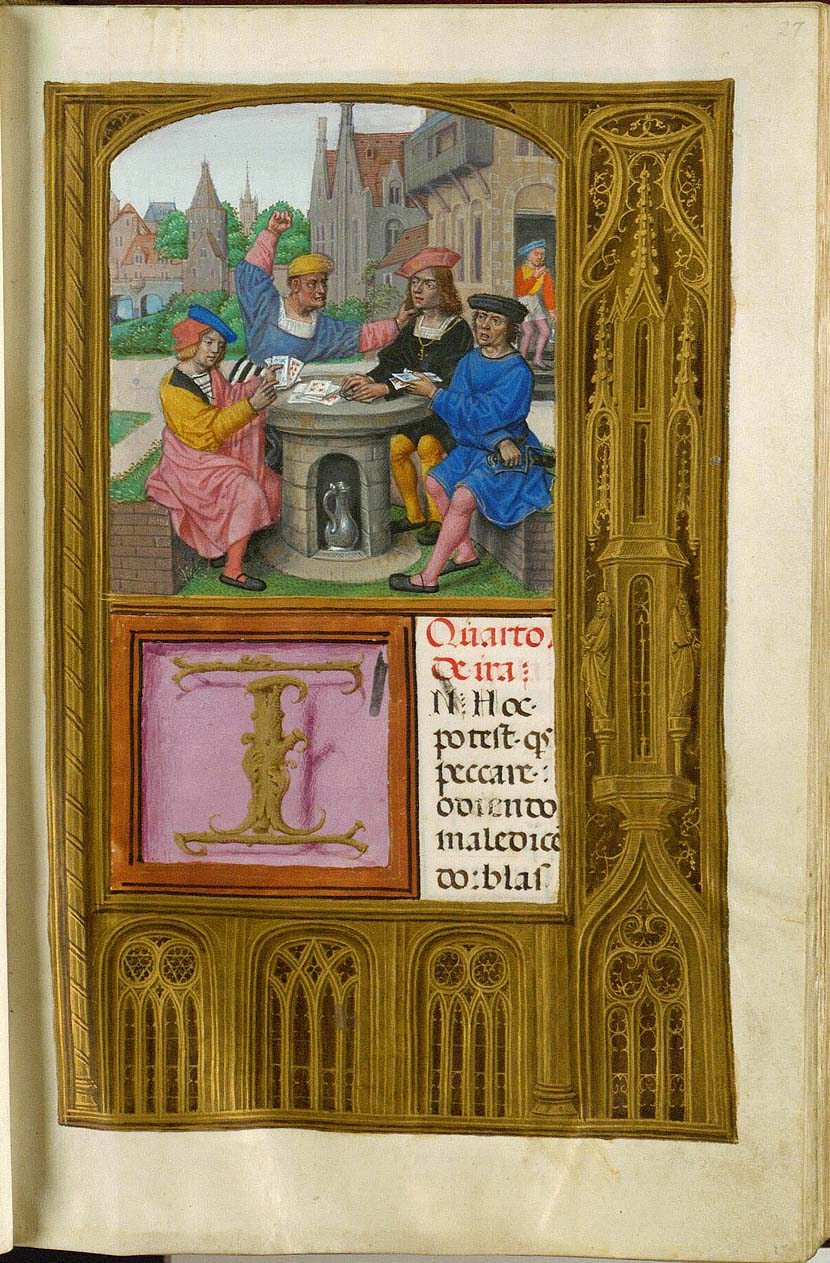
Illumination displaying the deadly sin of wrath

The Psalter (GKS 1605 4°) is a medieval illuminated manuscript, a psalter made in Flanders c. 1500–35. It belongs to the Royal Library, Denmark. The quality of its illuminations has been described as "unique".

The origins of the book are not known, though it may have been commissioned by Isabella of Austria, wife of Christian II of Denmark. It was probably illuminated by a follower of Gerard Horenbout and the scribe may have been one Anthonius van Damme, active in Bruges. It contains 150 psalms as well as other hymns, as well as minor texts and illustrations. The book was unexpectedly discovered in Rosenborg Castle in Copenhagen in 1781, in a chest which had remained unopened for more than a hundred years.
