= Alexandria Codex =

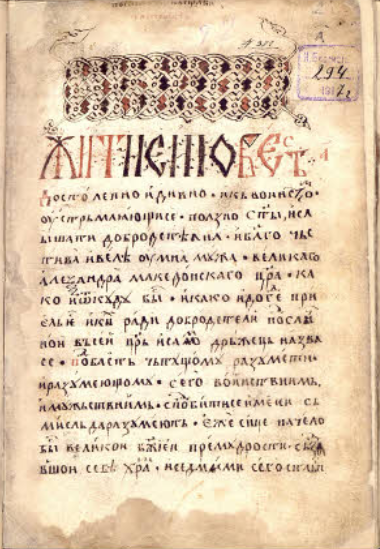
- Author: anonymous
- Language: Serbian
- Publication date: 15th-century
- Media type: ink and illumination on parchment
- Pages: 555
- SS. Cyril and St. Methodius National Library

The Alexandria Codex of Sofia is a 15th-century manuscript collection that includes the illustrated "Alexandria", the Trojan Legend (a story about the Trojan war), the Legend for the Indian Kingdom, and various liturgical articles, proverbs and texts devoted to fortune-telling.

== Description ==
The manuscript pages measure 21 х 14 centimeters. It is in the collection of the SS Cyril and Methodius National Library.

== Provenance ==
The manuscript was for a long time in the possession of Mano Kalpakchim, a well-known contractor and book-lover of the 18th century. It is now at the Bulgarian National Library in Sofia, courtesy of N. Hristov of Tzaribrod, Serbia.

== Analysis ==
Among others, the manuscript collection discusses the well-known life-story of Alexander the Great, the son of Philip II, king of Macedon, who lived in the 4th century BC, and subjects classified as secular Middle Ages literature, including Southern Slavic literature.

In the Middle Ages, the Latin version of the manuscript collection was widely available in Western Europe. One of them, created in the 10th century, served as a basis for many adaptations in the French, German and Czech literatures. Two versions appeared in different times in the Slavic south: Bulgarian (10th–11th century) and Serbian (end of the 13th century, and the beginning of the 14th century. The Bulgarian National Library manuscript is one of the earliest Slavic transcriptions of this work, abounding in illustrations. It contains the Serbian version of the story, popularly known as the "Serbian Alexandria". As a typical work of the literature of the fantastic heroes, with a rich and entertaining narrative, this story was well known in the 14th century and 15th century in the Slavic world. Encouraged by printed editions of the work, interest in it continued until the 19th century.

== Sources ==
- CHRISTIANS, Dagmar. Die Serbische Alexandreis: nach der Sofioter illustrierten Handschrift Nr. 771. Köln: Böhlau, 1991. Bausteine zur Slavischen Philologie und Kulturgeschichte. Reihe B, Editionen. ISBN 3-412-08391-7.
- Милутиновић, Милан et al. Софијска илустрована Александрида: фототипско изд. Београд : Народна библиотека Србије 1987.
- Национална библиотека „Св. Св. Кирил и Методий” St. St. Cyril and Methodius National Library
