= Papyrus 3053 =

Papyrus fragment

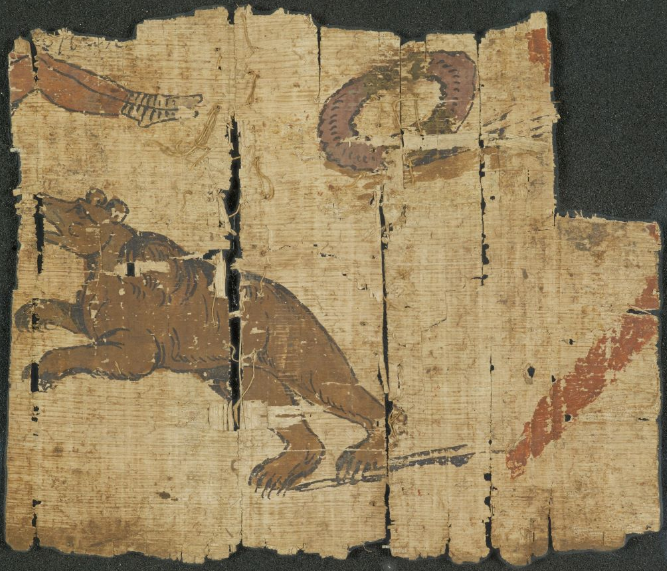
Papyrus 3053

Papyrus 3053 (P. Oxy. 2470) is a papyrus fragment about 12.7 cm × 15.2 cm (5.0 in × 6.0 in) now kept in the British Library. It was probably made in Roman Egypt between the 3rd and 6th centuries AD. It was found at Oxyrhynchus among other documents mostly of the 3rd century and was given to the library in 1962. At the time, T. C. Skeat called it "a most notable addition to the very scanty remains of classical book-illustration".

The fragment is illustrated, but the only text is a fragment of a word or name in Greek letters in the upper left: ερσωις. The scene depicts a brown bear lunging at a person, only the legs of whom are visible. The background is neutral (uncoloured). The bear is painted in a lively fashion, with shadowing at its feet used to add depth. The light purple circle in the upper right is probably the cloth a circus performer was using to bait the bear. The feat depicted is probably the contomonobolon, a pole-assisted somersault over the back of the baited animal. The drawing was outlined in black before being coloured in, the usual method on papyrus.
