= Life of Saint Denis (Bibliothèque Nationale, MS fr. 2090–2092) =

1317 French illuminated manuscript

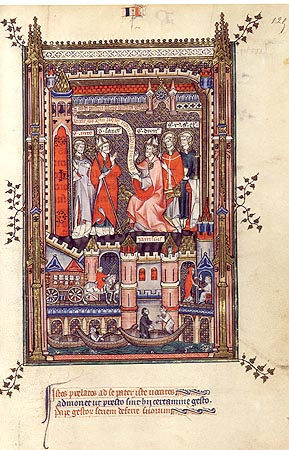

Bibliothèque Nationale, MS fr. 2090-2092 is an illuminated manuscript of The Life of Saint Denis, a hagiographical account of the life and martyrdom of Saint Denis, the first Bishop of Paris. The manuscript was produced in Paris and was begun at the request of John de Pontoise, Abbot of the Abbey of Saint Denis, as a gift for Philip IV. The king died before the manuscript was completed. The manuscript was completed in 1317 and presented by the abbot to Philip V.

The manuscript is currently bound in four volumes, Bibliothèque Nationale, MS fr 2090, 2091, 2092 and Bibliothèque Nationale, MS lat. 13836. Lat. 13836 is a fragment that was separated from the main manuscript early in its history. The manuscript contains 77 illustrations of the life and martyrdom of Saint Denis. These 77 illustrations are only a portion of the full iconographic cycle which had developed for the Life of Saint Denis. Twenty-nine of the miniatures contain, in addition to scenes from the Life of Saint Denis, depictions of various artisans and merchants of 14th century Paris at work.

This manuscript is a prominent example of one of two trends present in Parisian enlightenment during the first years of the 14th century. The first trend was a continuation of the style of Master Honoré in which the human figure is treated with a sinuous plasticity and, despite the use of modeling to create the impression of relief, was contained within a flat and depthless field. In the second trend, represented by this manuscript, the human figures lack the fluidity of those of Honoré's followers and have a remarkable solidity and lack the affected poses and exaggerated stances of the first style. This trend was something new within Parisian illumination and combined the almost sculptural treatment of the human body with an attention to the details of daily life, as shown in the scenes of daily life found in this manuscript.
