= Coluccio =

Coluccio is an Italian surname and given name. Notable people with the name include:

- Coluccio Salutati (1331 – 1406), Italian humanist
- Giuseppe Coluccio (born 1966), Italian gangster
- Bob Coluccio, (born 1951), baseball player
