= Psalter of Louis X =

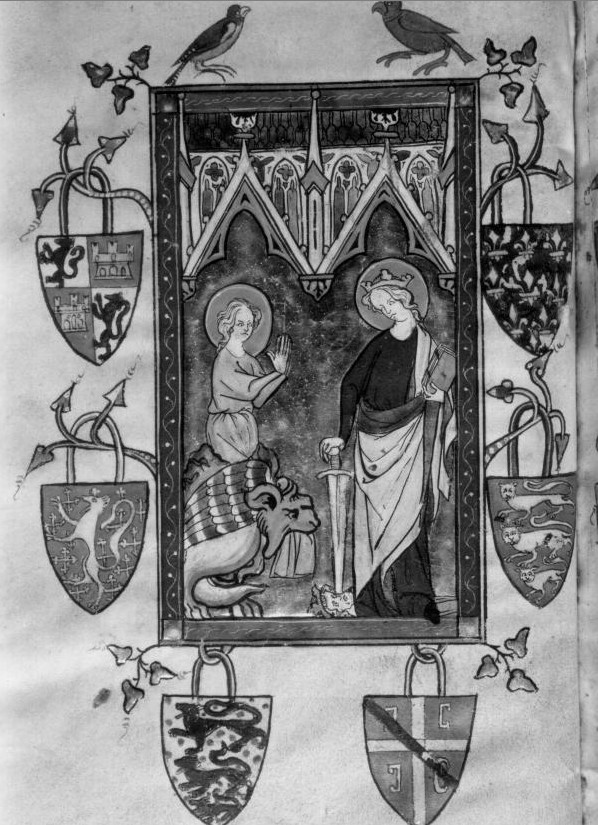
Armorial miniature

The Psalter of Louis X (French: Psautier de Louis le Hutin) is an illuminated psalter that belonged to King Louis X of France and his first wife, Queen Margaret. It is now in the library of Tournai Cathedral, shelfmark Tournai, Archives et Bibliothèque de la Cathédrale, B.C.T. A 17.

The psalter was made around 1315. It has 256 leaves of parchment (equal to 512 pages of text). It contains a calendar, the Vulgate Latin text of the biblical Book of Psalms, and a Litany of the Saints in addition to two short hors-texte. It contains a decoration featuring a cat.

== Gallery ==
The psalter contains several drolleries:

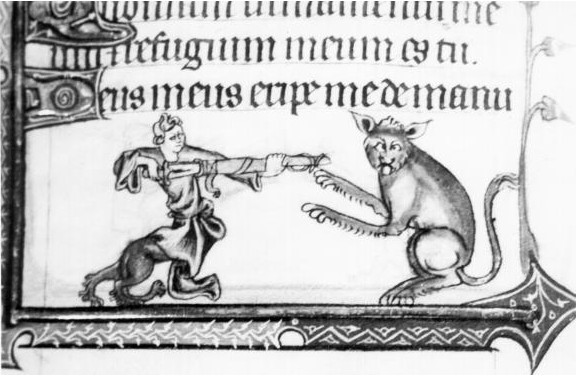
Man and lion

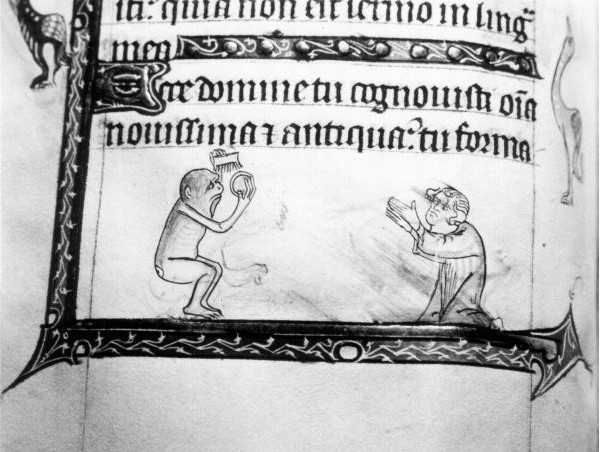
Monkey with comb

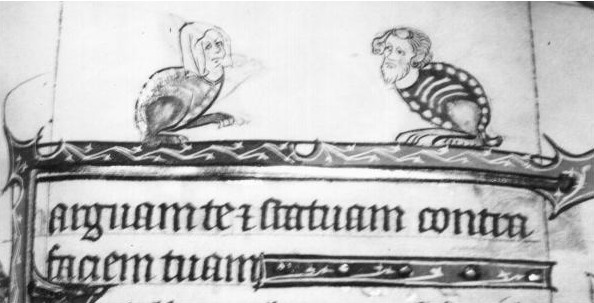
Human-headed birds
