= Johnson Papyrus =

5th century papyrus

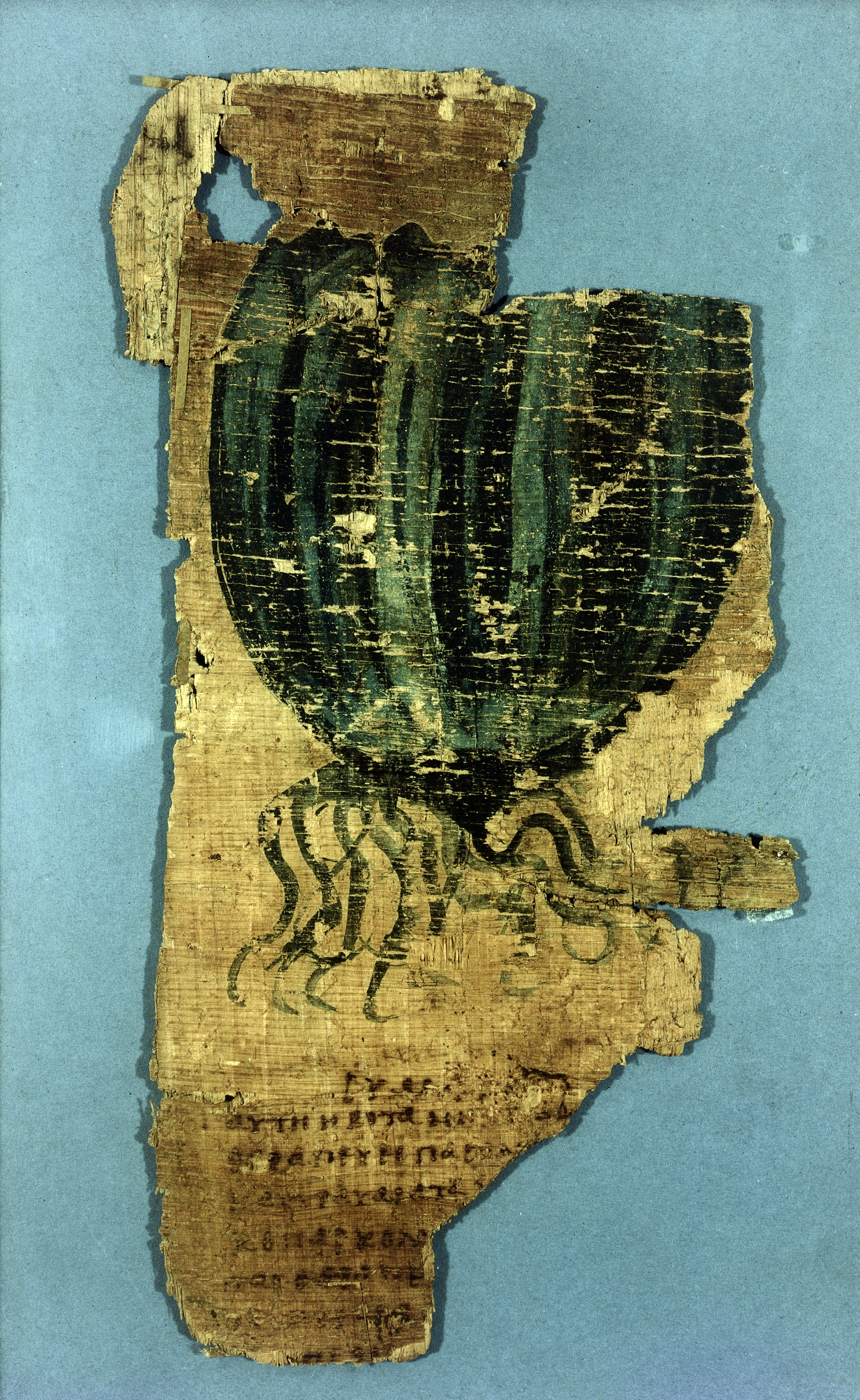
The Johnson Papyrus

The Johnson Papyrus (London, Wellcome Library, MS 5753) is a fragment of an early 5th century AD herbal. It is the oldest extant manuscript illustration of a plant. The papyrus fragment shows a sphere of dark blue-green leaves supported by some small scraggly roots. Below the illustration is a fragment of Greek text. The illustrated plant has been identified as "symphyton" (modern comfrey), which was an important medicinal plant. However the illustration does not closely resemble comfrey, so that, if the identification is correct, the illustration would have had been of little use as an aid to identification.
