= Masters of the Dark Eyes Missal =

Manuscript from Utrecht, Netherlands

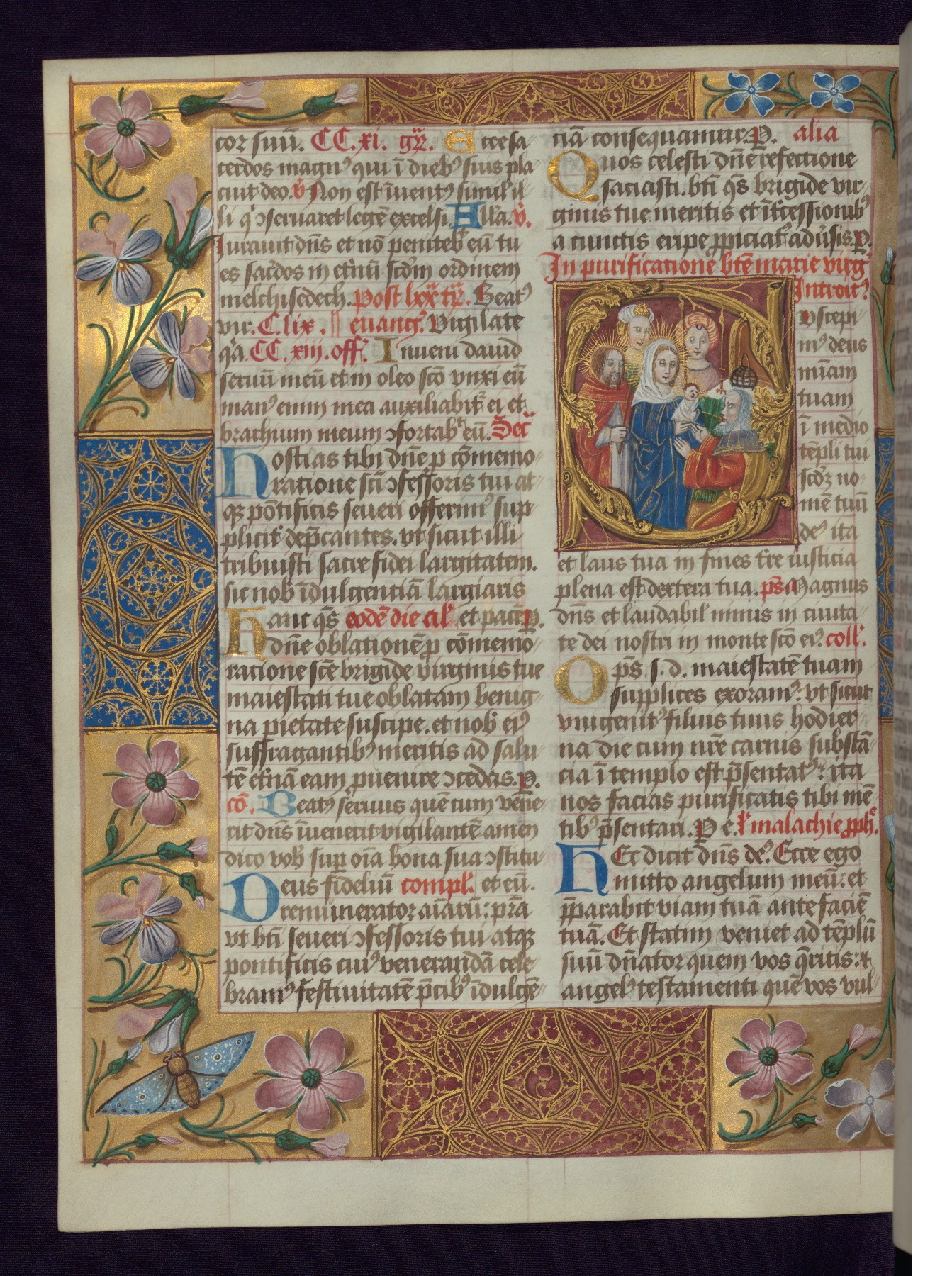
Sanctorale: Feast of the purification of the Blessed Virgin Mary, Masters of the Dark Eyes Missal, Walters Ms. W.175, fol. 158v

The Masters of the Dark Eyes Missal (Walters Art Museum, MS. W. 175) is a late 15th c. illuminated missal that was created in Utrecht, the Netherlands. The name of the Dutch missal is taken from an academic term that was used to describe a specific artistic movement, Masters of the Dark Eyes, that emerged from the Ghent-Bruges School and was named for its unique use of darkened areas around the eyes of its painted figures.

The manuscript contains a total of 236 leaves that are made of parchment. The contents of the manuscript appears to have undergone rebinding during the 19th century and are now covered in a dark blue Morocco leather with gilded decorations. This illuminated medieval manuscript is currently in the Walters Art Museum in Baltimore, Maryland. The contents of the manuscript include illuminated miniatures and Flemish-style borders that feature flowers, insects, and jewels. Most of the written pages have two columns with 33 lines in red ink and Gothic Bastarda calligraphy.

The image shows a page from the missal for the Feast of the Purification of the Virgin. The initial "S" commencing the Introit is historiated with a scene showing the presentation. The historiated text commences Suscépimus, Deus, misericórdiam tuam in médio templi tui ... (We have received Thy mercy, O God, in the midst of Thy temple ...) and continues to the Collect commencing with an illuminated "O" beginning Omnípotens, sempitérne Deus, majestátem tuam súpplices exorámus ... (Almighty and everlasting God, we humbly beseech Thy Majesty ...).
