= Romance Papyrus =

Fragment of a 2nd-century Greek manuscript of an unknown romance

The Romance Papyrus (Paris, Bibliothèque Nationale, cod. suppl. gr. 1294, also known as the Alexander Papyrus) is a fragment of 2nd century Greek manuscript of an unknown romance. It contains three unframed illustrations set within the columns of text. It is one of the few surviving scraps of classical literary illustration on papyrus. The fragment is 340 by 115 mm. It was acquired by the Bibliothèque Nationale in 1900.

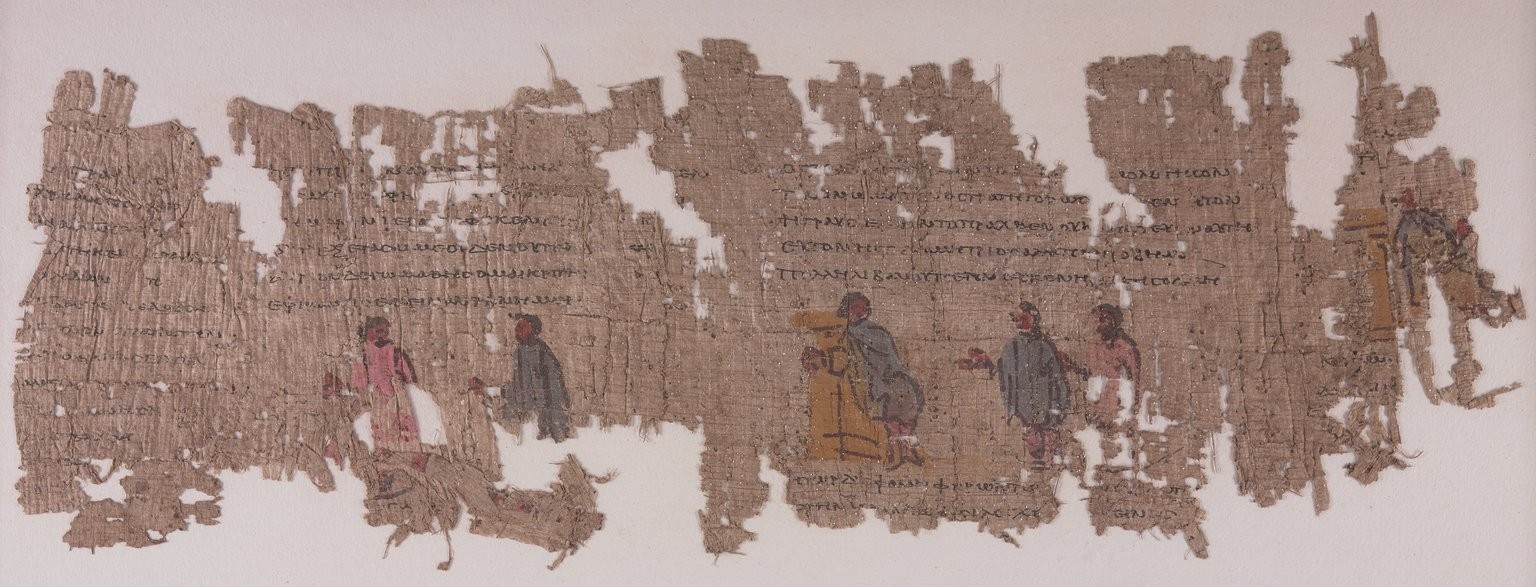
