= Carmen graecum de herbis =

Anonymous ancient Greek treatise

The Carmen graecum de herbis (Greek poem about herbs) is a treatise written anonymously by a Greek between the 2nd and 3rd century AD. It consists of 216 lines written in ionic Greek dialect. It is handed down by the Vienna Dioscorides.

== See also ==
- Dioscorides
- Vienna Dioscorides
