= Biblioteca Nazionale Vittorio Emanuele III =

National library in Naples, Italy

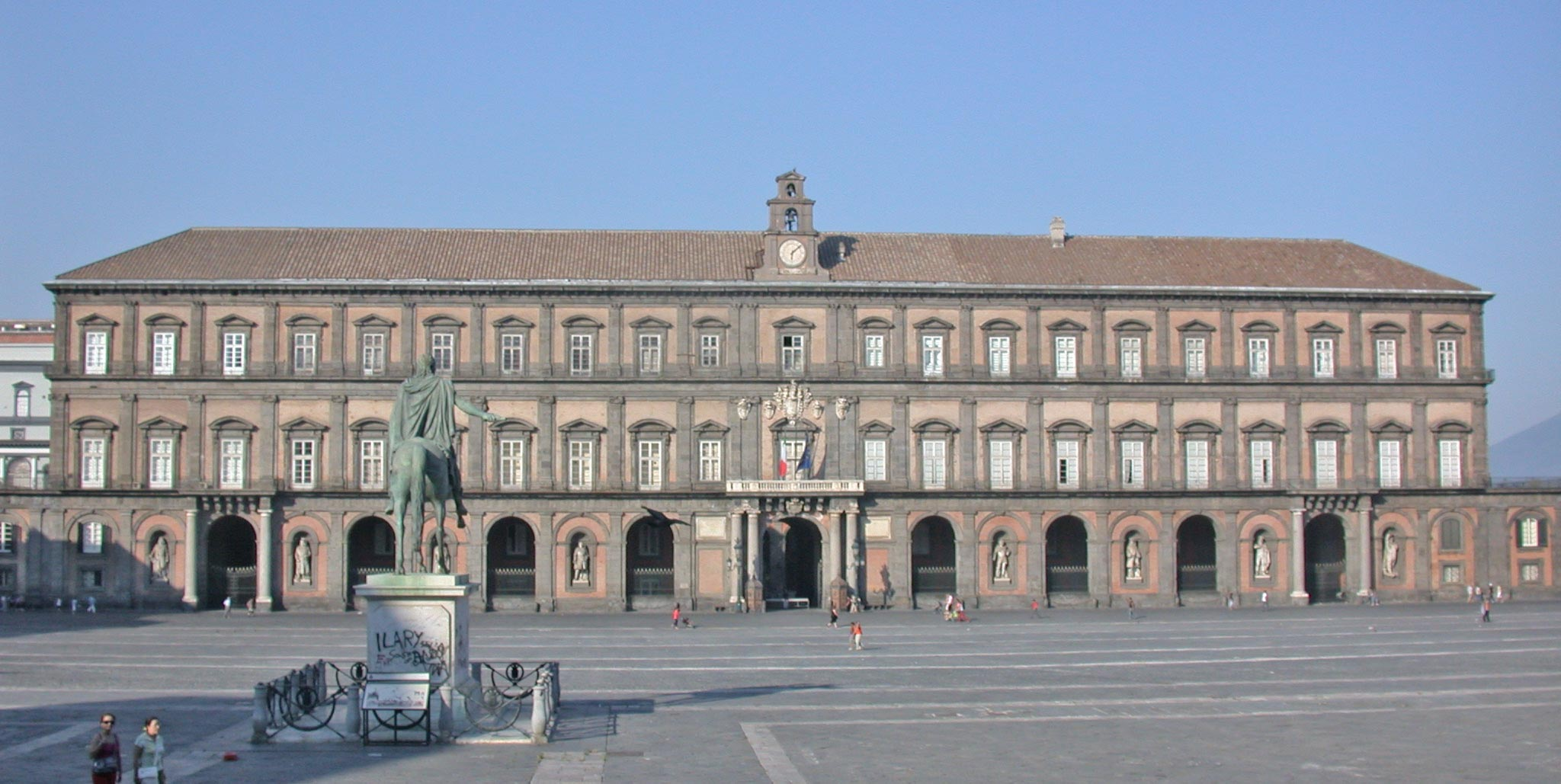
- 40.8362°N 14.2496°E
- Established: 1790s

Collection
- Size: 1,480,747 printed volumes, 319,187 pamphlets

Other information
- Website: Biblioteca Nazionale Vittorio Emanuele III

The Biblioteca Nazionale Vittorio Emanuele III (Victor Emmanuel III National Library) is a national library of Italy. It occupies the eastern wing of the 18th-century Palazzo Reale in Naples, at 1 Piazza del Plebiscito, and has entrances from piazza Trieste e Trento. It is funded and organised by the Direzione Generale per i Beni Librari and the Ministero per i Beni e le Attività Culturali.

In quantitative terms it is the third largest library in Italy, after the national libraries in Rome and Florence, with 1,480,747 printed volumes, 319,187 pamphlets, 18,415 manuscripts, more than 8,000 periodicals, 4,500 incunabula and the 1,800 Herculaneum papyri. 22 Manuscripts from the Codices Supplementum Graecum fond in the Austrian National Library were transferred to the Biblioteca Nazionale, now under the fond Manoscritti ex-Viennesi or Codex ex-Vindobonensis, such as the Naples Dioscurides.

== History and collections ==
The library was founded at the end of the 18th century in the Palazzo degli Studi (which now houses the Museo Archeologico), with its nucleus formed of books holdings of the Palazzo Capodimonte, the library from the celebrated Farnese Collection that Carlo di Borbone had transferred to Naples in 1734).

Opened to the public in 1804 under the name of the Reale Biblioteca di Napoli, and directed by the great humanist Juan Andrés, who composed his most important memoir, in Latin, published in Madrid by the Instituto Juan Andrés de Comparatística y Globalización with a study that broadens and renews the knowledge of this key and very intricate place in European culture.

In 1816 it changed its name to Reale Biblioteca Borbonica. Additions to its collection came from abolished religious houses and those confiscated from private collections. With the unification of Italy in 1860 it took up its present name of the Biblioteca Nazionale.

In 1910 the Officina dei papiri ercolanensi was added to the library – this was the workshop founded by Carlo di Borbone to conserve the papyri found in excavations at Herculaneum. After long debate and on the suggestion and efforts of Benedetto Croce, in 1922 the library was moved to its present location at Palazzo Reale, granted to the library by King Victor Emmanuel III (whose name it still bears). After the transfer, the collections of other important Neapolitan libraries were annexed to it, including the Biblioteca Brancacciana (formed in Rome by Cardinal Francesco Maria Brancaccio in the first half of the 17th century, transferred to Naples, and finally becoming Naples' first public library).

It suffered during the Second World War due to the German and Allied occupations of Naples (being set fire to by the Germans in the four days of Naples), though the most precious manuscripts had been transferred to safer locations and remained there until the library reopened in 1945. In 1980 a wing of the building was seriously damaged by an earthquake, forcing the library to transfer some of its holdings to another part of the building.

== See also ==
- Old Testament fragment (Naples, Biblioteca Vittorio Emanuele III, 1 B 18)
- Lectionary 138
- Uncial 0116
- Austrian National Library
- Naples Dioscurides
