= Crateuas =

Crateuas may refer to:

- Crateuas or Craterus of Macedon, King of Macedon in 399 BC
- Crateuas, father of Peithon of Macedon
- Crateuas or Cratevas (physician), Greek artist, physician, and herbalist
