= De materia medica =

1st century pharmacopoeia of medicinal plants and medicines by Pedanius Dioscorides

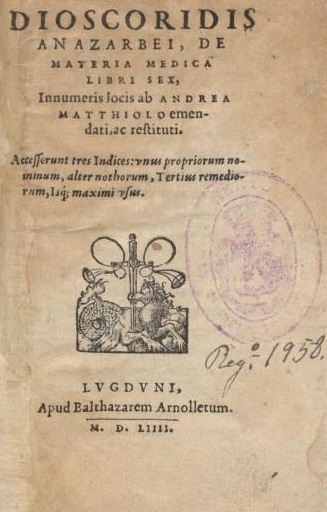
- Cover of an early printed version, Lyon, 1554
- Author: Pedanius Dioscorides
- Original title: Περὶ ὕλης ἰατρικῆς
- Language: Greek
- Subject: Medicinal plants, drugs
- Genre: Non-fiction
- Publication date: 50–70 CE
- Publication place: Ancient Rome
- English publication date: 1655 (first English translation)
- Media type: Manuscript, print
- Pages: 5 volumes
- Text: De materia medica at Wikisource

De materia medica (Latin name for the Greek work Περὶ ὕλης ἰατρικῆς, Peri hulēs iatrikēs, both meaning "On Medical Material") is a pharmacopoeia of medicinal plants and the medicines that can be obtained from them. The five-volume work was written between 50 and 70 CE by Pedanius Dioscorides, a Greek physician in the Roman army. It was widely read for more than 1,500 years until supplanted by revised herbals in the Renaissance, making it one of the longest-lasting of all natural history and pharmacology books.

The work describes many drugs known to be effective, including aconite, aloes, colocynth, colchicum, henbane, opium and squill. In total, about 600 plants are covered, along with some animals and mineral substances, and around 1000 medicines made from them.

De materia medica was circulated as illustrated manuscripts, copied by hand, in Greek, Latin, and Arabic throughout the medieval period. From the 16th century onwards, Dioscorides' text was translated into Italian, German, Spanish, French, and into English in 1655. It served as the foundation for herbals in these languages by figures such as Leonhart Fuchs, Valerius Cordus, Lobelius, Rembert Dodoens, Carolus Clusius, John Gerard, and William Turner. Over time, these herbals incorporated increasing numbers of direct observations, gradually supplementing and eventually supplanting the classical text.

Several manuscripts and early printed versions of De materia medica survive, including the illustrated Vienna Dioscurides manuscript written in the original Greek in 6th-century Constantinople; it was used there by the Byzantines as a hospital text for just over a thousand years. Sir Arthur Hill saw a monk on Mount Athos still using a copy of Dioscorides to identify plants in 1934.

== Book ==
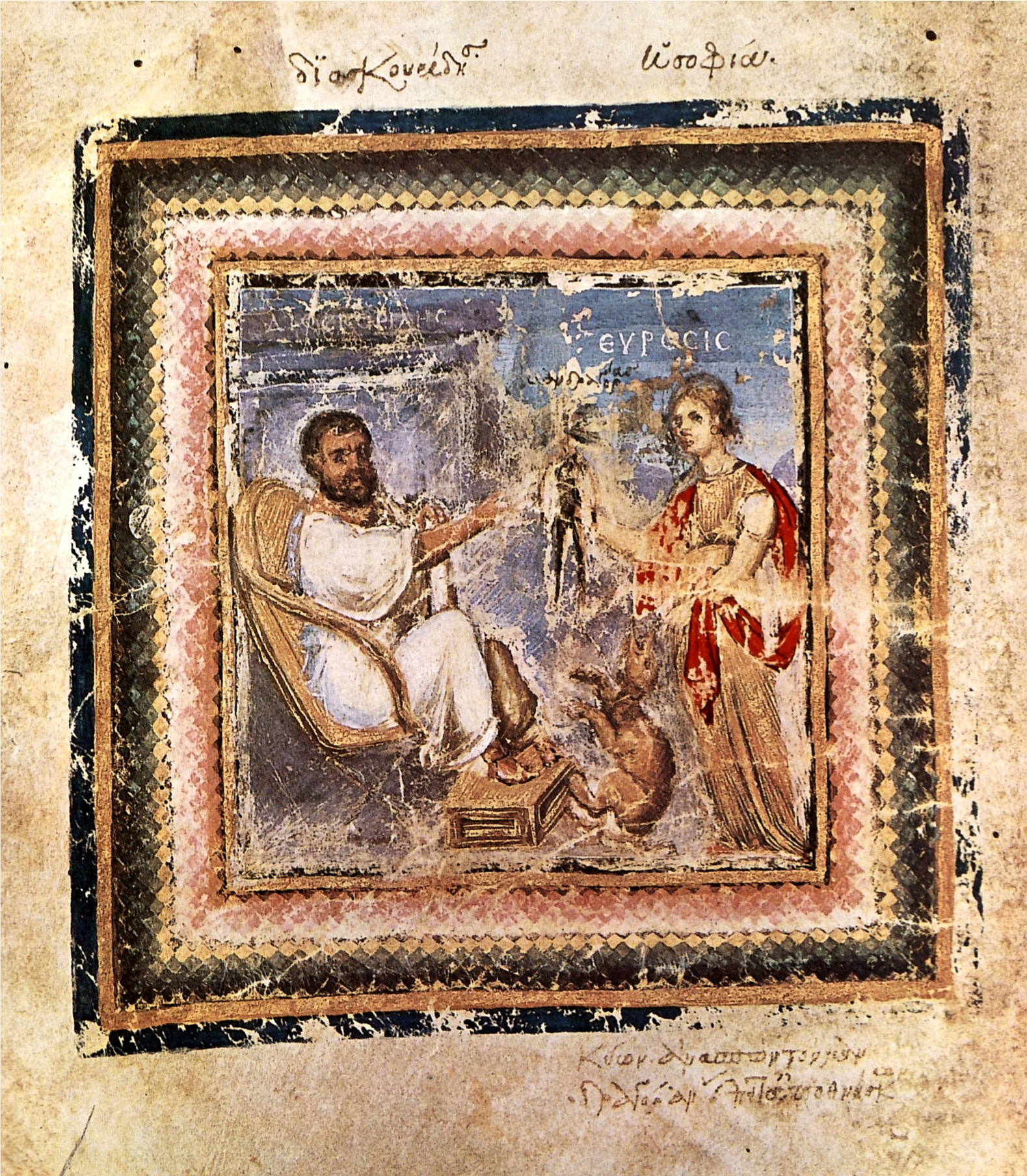
Dioscorides receives a mandrake root. Vienna Dioscurides manuscript, early 6th century.

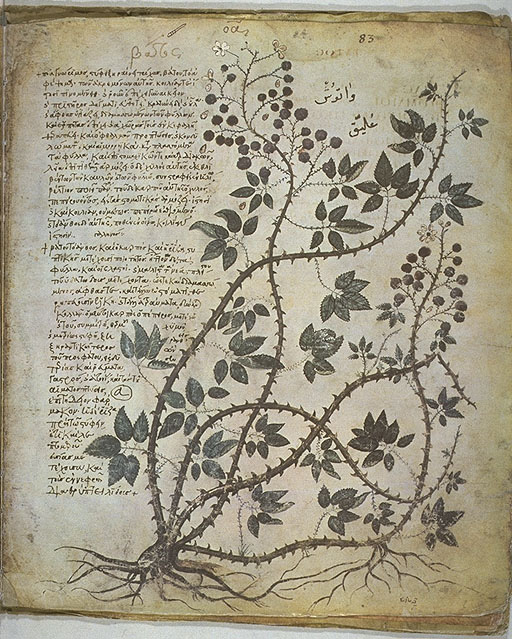
Blackberry. Vienna Dioscurides, early 6th century

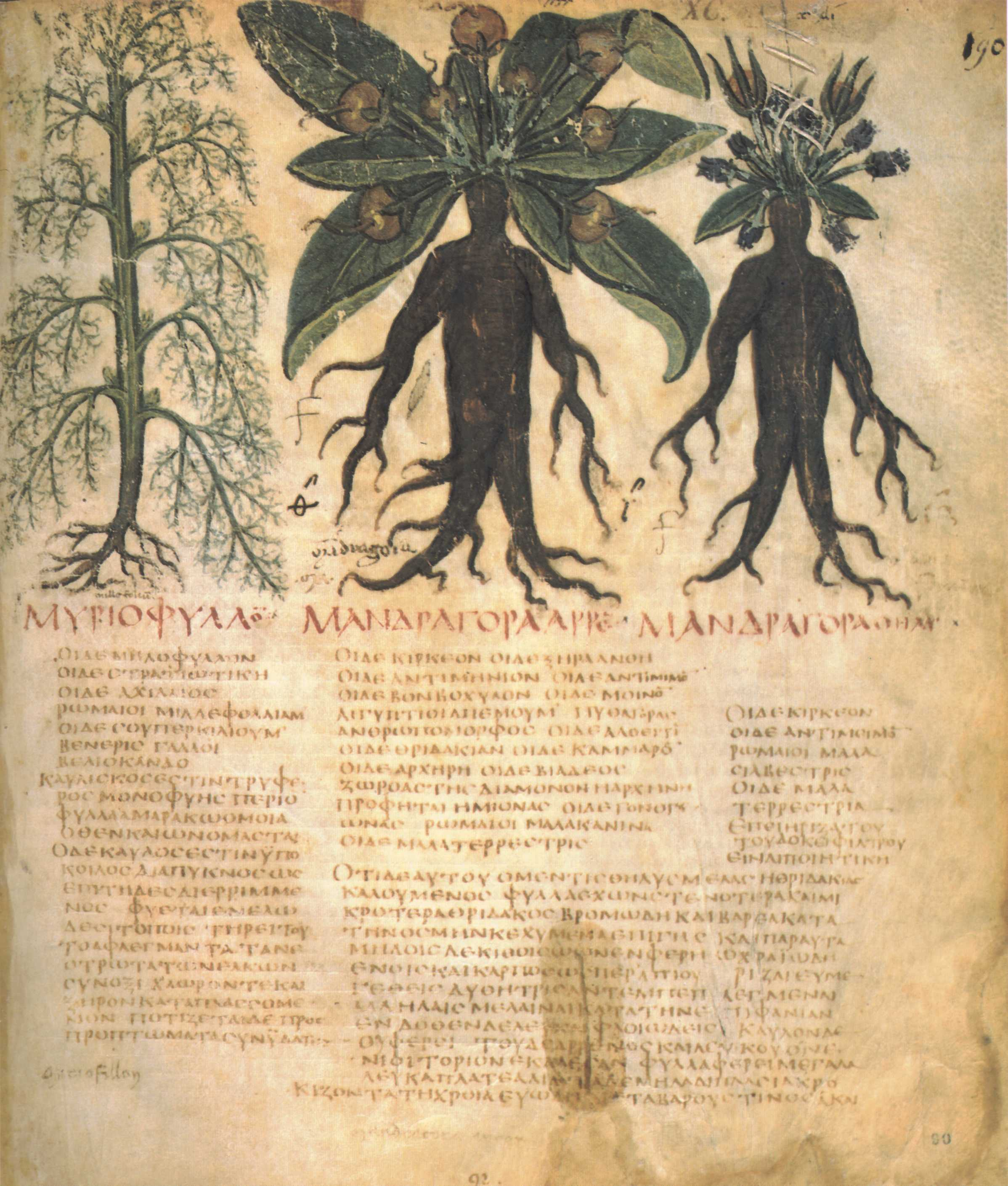
Mandrake (written 'ΜΑΝΔΡΑΓΟΡΑ' in Greek capitals). Naples Dioscurides, 7th century.

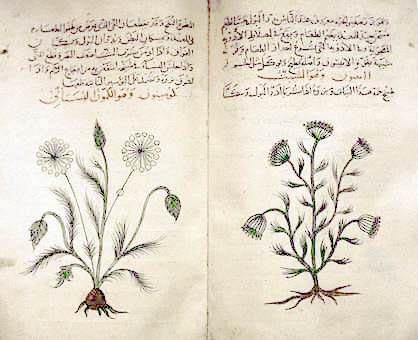
Cumin and dill from an Arabic book of simples (c. 1334) after Dioscorides

Between 50 and 70 AD, a Greek physician in the Roman army, Dioscorides, wrote a five-volume book in his native Greek, Περὶ ὕλης ἰατρικῆς (Peri hules iatrikēs, "On Medical Material"), known more widely in Western Europe by its Latin title De materia medica. He had studied pharmacology at Tarsus in Roman Anatolia (now Turkey). The book became the principal reference work on pharmacology across Europe and the Middle East for over 1,500 years, and was thus the precursor of all modern pharmacopoeias.

In contrast to many classical authors, De materia medica was not "rediscovered" in the Renaissance, because it never left circulation; indeed, Dioscorides' text eclipsed the Hippocratic Corpus. In the medieval period, De materia medica was circulated in Latin, Greek, and Arabic. In the Renaissance from 1478 onwards, it was printed in Italian, German, Spanish, and French as well. In 1655, John Goodyer made an English translation from a printed version, probably not corrected from the Greek.

While being reproduced in manuscript form through the centuries, the text was often supplemented with commentary and minor additions from Arabic and Indian sources. Several illustrated manuscripts of De materia medica survive. The most famous is the lavishly illustrated Vienna Dioscurides (the Juliana Anicia Codex), written in the original Greek in Byzantine Constantinople in 512/513 AD; its illustrations are sufficiently accurate to permit identification, something not possible with later medieval drawings of plants; some of them may be copied from a lost volume owned by Juliana Anicia's great-grandfather, Theodosius II, in the early 5th century. The Naples Dioscurides and Morgan Dioscurides are somewhat later Byzantine manuscripts in Greek, while other Greek manuscripts survive today in the monasteries of Mount Athos. Densely-illustrated Arabic copies survive from the 12th and 13th centuries. The result is a complex set of relationships between manuscripts, involving translation, copying errors, additions of text and illustrations, deletions, reworkings, and a combination of copying from one manuscript and correction from another.

De materia medica is the prime historical source of information about the medicines used by the Greeks, Romans, and other cultures of antiquity. The work also records the Dacian names for some plants, which otherwise would have been lost. The work presents about 600 medicinal plants in all, along with some animals and mineral substances, and around 1,000 medicines made from these sources. Botanists have not always found Dioscorides' plants easy to identify from his short descriptions, partly because he had naturally described plants and animals from southeastern Europe, whereas by the 16th century his book was in use all over Europe and across the Islamic world. This meant that people attempted to force a match between the plants they knew and those described by Dioscorides, leading to what could be catastrophic results.

== Approach ==
Each entry gives a substantial amount of detail on the plant or substance in question, concentrating on medicinal uses but giving such mention of other uses (such as culinary) and help with recognition as considered necessary. For example, on the "Mekon Agrios and Mekon Emeros", the opium poppy and related species, Dioscorides states that the seed of one is made into bread: it has "a somewhat long little head and white seed", while another "has a head bending down" and a third is "more wild, more medicinal and longer than these, with a head somewhat long—and they are all cooling." After this brief description, he moves at once into pharmacology, saying that they cause sleep; other uses are to treat inflammation and erysipela, and if boiled with honey to make a cough mixture. The account thus combines recognition, pharmacological effect, and guidance on drug preparation. Its effects are summarized, accompanied by a caution:

A little of it (taken with as much as a grain of ervum) is a pain-easer, a sleep-causer, and a digester, helping coughs and abdominal cavity afflictions. Taken as a drink too often it hurts (making men lethargic) and it kills. It is helpful for aches, sprinkled on with rosaceum; and for pain in the ears dropped in them with oil of almonds, saffron, and myrrh. For inflammation of the eyes it is used with a roasted egg yolk and saffron, and for erysipela and wounds with vinegar; but for gout with women's milk and saffron. Put up with the finger as a suppository it causes sleep.

— Dioscorides—Mekon Agrios and Mekon Emeros

Dioscorides then describes how to tell a good from a counterfeit preparation. He mentions the recommendations of other physicians, Diagoras (according to Eristratus), Andreas, and Mnesidemus, only to dismiss them as false and not borne out by experience. He ends with a description of how the liquid is gathered from poppy plants, and lists names used for it: chamaesyce, mecon rhoeas, oxytonon; papaver to the Romans, and wanti to the Egyptians.

As late as in the Tudor and Stuart periods in Britain, herbals often still classified plants in the same way as Dioscorides and other classical authors, not by their structure or apparent relatedness but by how they smelt and tasted, whether they were edible, and what medicinal uses they had. Only when European botanists like Matthias de l'Obel, Andrea Cesalpino and Augustus Quirinus Rivinus (Bachmann) had done their best to match plants they knew to those listed in Dioscorides did they go further and create new classification systems based on similarity of parts, whether leaves, fruits, or flowers.

== Contents ==
The book is divided into five volumes. Dioscorides organized the substances by certain similarities, such as their being aromatic, or vines; these divisions do not correspond to any modern classification. In David Sutton's view the grouping is by the type of effect on the human body.

=== Volume I: Aromatics ===
Volume I covers aromatic oils, the plants that provide them, and ointments made from them. They include what are probably cardamom, nard, valerian, cassia or senna, cinnamon, balm of Gilead, hops, mastic, turpentine, pine resin, bitumen, heather, quince, apple, peach, apricot, lemon, pear, medlar, plum and many others.

=== Volume II: Animals to herbs ===
Volume II covers an assortment of topics: animals including sea creatures such as sea urchin, seahorse, whelk, mussel, crab, scorpion, electric ray, viper, cuttlefish and many others; dairy produce; cereals; vegetables such as sea kale, beetroot, asparagus; and sharp herbs such as garlic, leek, onion, caper and mustard.

=== Volume III: Roots, seeds and herbs ===
Volume III covers roots, seeds and herbs. These include plants that may be rhubarb, gentian, liquorice, caraway, cumin, parsley, lovage, fennel and many others.

=== Volume IV: Roots and herbs, continued ===
Volume IV describes further roots and herbs not covered in Volume III. These include herbs that may be betony, Solomon's seal, clematis, horsetail, daffodil and many others.

=== Volume V: Vines, wines and minerals ===
Volume V covers the grapevine, wine made from it, grapes and raisins; but also strong medicinal potions made by boiling many other plants including mandrake, hellebore, and various metal compounds, such as what may be zinc oxide, verdigris and iron oxide.

== Influence and effectiveness ==
=== In Europe ===
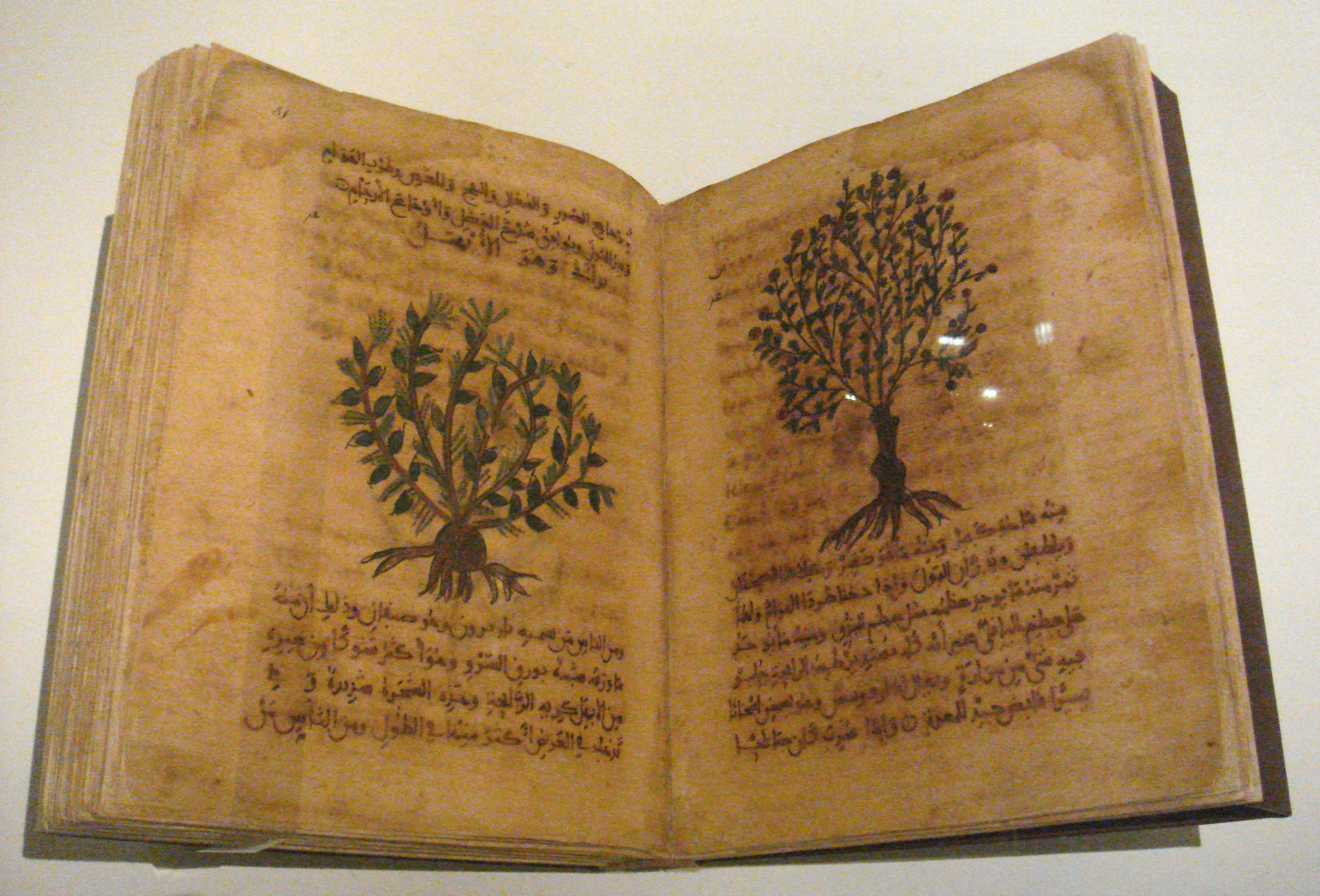
De materia medica in Arabic, Spain, 12th–13th century

Writing in The Great Naturalists, the historian of science David Sutton describes De materia medica as "one of the most enduring works of natural history ever written" and that "it formed the basis for Western knowledge of medicines for the next 1,500 years."

The historian of science Marie Boas writes that herbalists depended entirely on Dioscorides and Theophrastus until the 16th century, when they finally realized they could work on their own. She notes also that herbals by different authors, such as Leonhart Fuchs, Valerius Cordus, Lobelius, Rembert Dodoens, Carolus Clusius, John Gerard and William Turner, were dominated by Dioscorides, his influence only gradually weakening as the 16th-century herbalists "learned to add and substitute their own observations".

Early science and medicine historian Paula Findlen, writing in the Cambridge History of Science: Early Modern Science, calls De materia medica "one of the most successful and enduring herbals of antiquity, [which] emphasized the importance of understanding the natural world in light of its medicinal efficiency", in contrast to Pliny's Natural History (which emphasized the wonders of nature) or the natural history studies of Aristotle and Theophrastus (which emphasized the causes of natural phenomena). Medicine historian Vivian Nutton, in Ancient Medicine, writes that Dioscorides's "five books in Greek On Materia medica attained canonical status in Late Antiquity." Science historian Brian Ogilvie calls Dioscorides "the greatest ancient herbalist", and De materia medica "the summa of ancient descriptive botany", observing that its success was such that few other books in his domain have survived from classical times. Further, his approach matched the Renaissance liking for detailed description, unlike the philosophical search for essential nature (as in Theophrastus's Historia Plantarum). A critical moment was the decision by Niccolò Leoniceno and others to use Dioscorides "as the model of the careful naturalist—and his book De materia medica as the model for natural history."

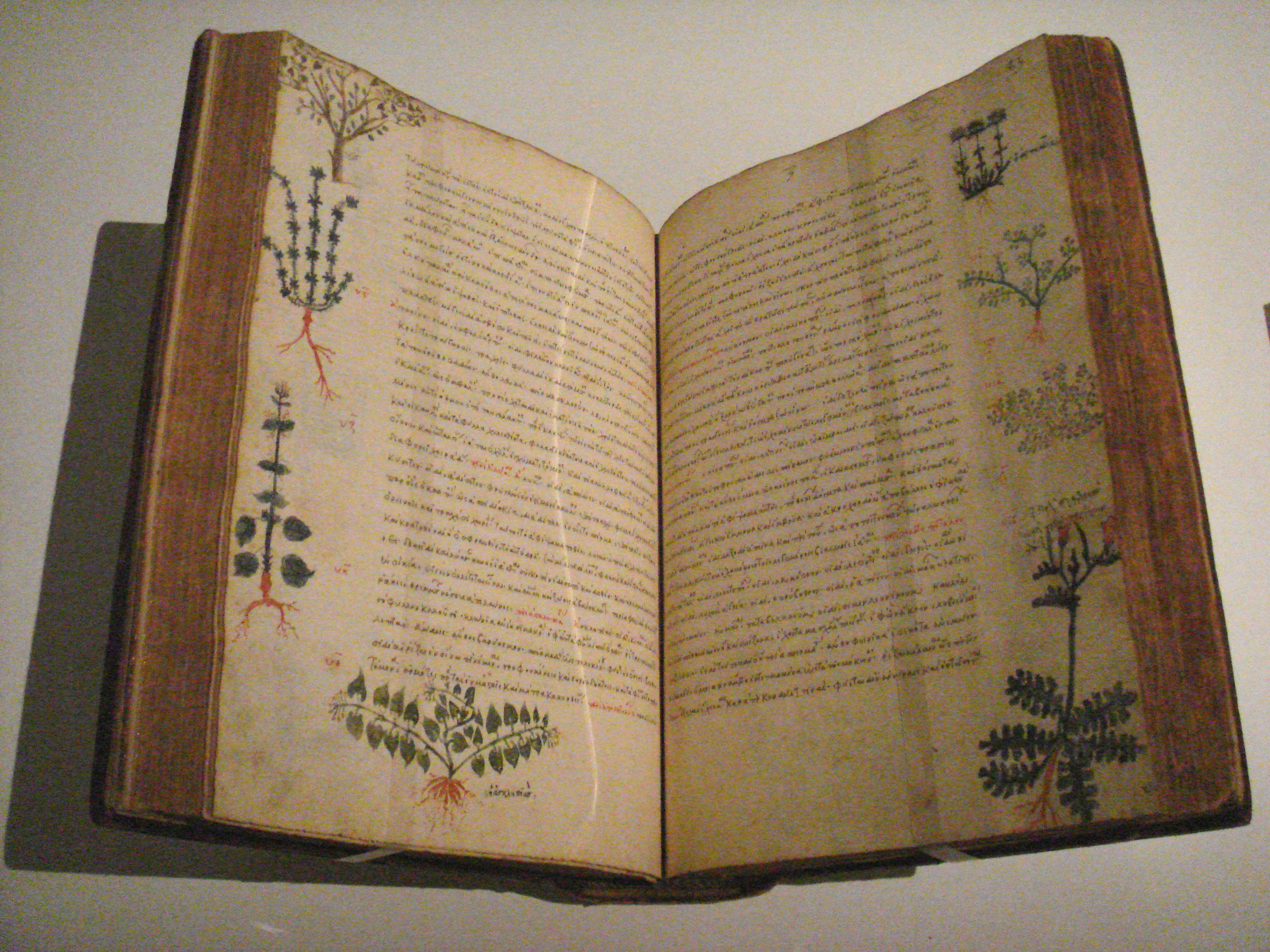
Byzantine De materia medica, 15th century

The Dioscorides translator and editor Tess Anne Osbaldeston notes that "For almost two millennia Dioscorides was regarded as the ultimate authority on plants and medicine", and that he "achieved overwhelming commendation and approval because his writings addressed the many ills of mankind most usefully." To illustrate this, she states that "Dioscorides describes many valuable drugs including aconite, aloes, bitter apple, colchicum, henbane, and squill". The work mentions the painkillers willow (leading ultimately to aspirin, she writes), autumn crocus and opium, which however is also narcotic. Many other substances that Dioscorides describes remain in modern pharmacopoeias as "minor drugs, diluents, flavouring agents, and emollients ... [such as] ammoniacum, anise, cardamoms, catechu, cinnamon, colocynth, coriander, crocus, dill, fennel, galbanum, gentian, hemlock, hyoscyamus, lavender, linseed, mastic, male fern, marjoram, marshmallow, mezereon, mustard, myrrh, orris (iris), oak galls, olive oil, pennyroyal, pepper, peppermint, poppy, psyllium, rhubarb, rosemary, rue, saffron, sesame, squirting cucumber (elaterium), starch, stavesacre (delphinium), storax, stramonium, sugar, terebinth, thyme, white hellebore, white horehound, and couch grass—the last still used as a demulcent diuretic." She notes that medicines such as wormwood, juniper, ginger, and calamine also remain in use, while "Chinese and Indian physicians continue to use liquorice". She observes that the many drugs listed to reduce the spleen may be explained by the frequency of malaria in his time. Dioscorides lists drugs for women to cause abortion and to treat urinary tract infection; palliatives for toothache, such as colocynth, and others for intestinal pains; and treatments for skin and eye diseases. As well as these useful substances, she observes that "A few superstitious practices are recorded in De materia medica," such as using Echium as an amulet to ward off snakes, or Polemonia (Jacob's ladder) for scorpion stings.

In the view of the historian Paula De Vos, De materia medica formed the core of the European pharmacopoeia until the end of the 19th century, suggesting that "the timelessness of Dioscorides' work resulted from an empirical tradition based on trial and error; that it worked for generation after generation despite social and cultural changes and changes in medical theory".

At Mount Athos in northern Greece Dioscorides's text was still in use in its original Greek into the 20th century, as observed in 1934 by Sir Arthur Hill, Director of the Royal Botanic Gardens, Kew:

At Karyes there is an official Botanist Monk ... he was a remarkable old Monk with an extensive knowledge of plants and their properties. Though fully gowned in a long black cassock he traveled very quickly, usually on foot, and sometimes on a mule, carrying his 'Flora' with him in a large, black, bulky bag. Such a bag was necessary since his 'Flora' was nothing less than four manuscript folio volumes of Dioscorides, which apparently he himself had copied out. This Flora he invariably used for determining any plant which he could not name at sight, and he could find his way in his books and identify his plants—to his own satisfaction—with remarkable rapidity.

=== Arabic medicine ===
Along with his fellow physicians of Ancient Rome, Aulus Cornelius Celsus, Galen, Hippocrates and Soranus of Ephesus, Dioscorides had a major and long-lasting effect on Arabic medicine as well as medical practice across Europe. De materia medica was one of the first scientific works to be translated from Greek into Arabic (Arabic:Hayūlā ʿilāj al-ṭibb). It was translated first into Syriac and then into Arabic in 9th century Baghdad. The translators were most often Syriac Christians, such as Hunayn ibn Ishaq, and their work is known to have been sponsored by local rulers, such as the Artuqids.

==== Manuscripts ====
===== Leiden Dioscurides (1083) =====
Manuscript (Or. 289), dated 1083, an illustrated Arabic translation of Dioscurides' De Materia medica. The work was originally translated from Greek into Arabic via Syriac by Hunayn ibn Ishaq (810–873) with the collaboration of Stephanus b. Bāsīl between 847–861. This translation was slightly revised by Ḥusayn b. Ibrāhīm al-Nātilī in 990–991. The current copy is based on an exemplar in the hand of al-Nātilī. The work was offered to the amīr of Samarqand, Abū ʿAlī al-Simǧūrī. Acquired by Levinus Warner (1619–1665) and bequeathed to Leiden University Library on his death. A digitized version is available via Leiden's Digital Collections.

===== 1224 manuscript =====
One De materia medica manuscript is dated to 1224, but its provenance is uncertain. It is generally cautiously attributed to "Iraq or Northern Jazira, possibly Baghdad". Its folios have been dispersed among multiple institutions and collectors.

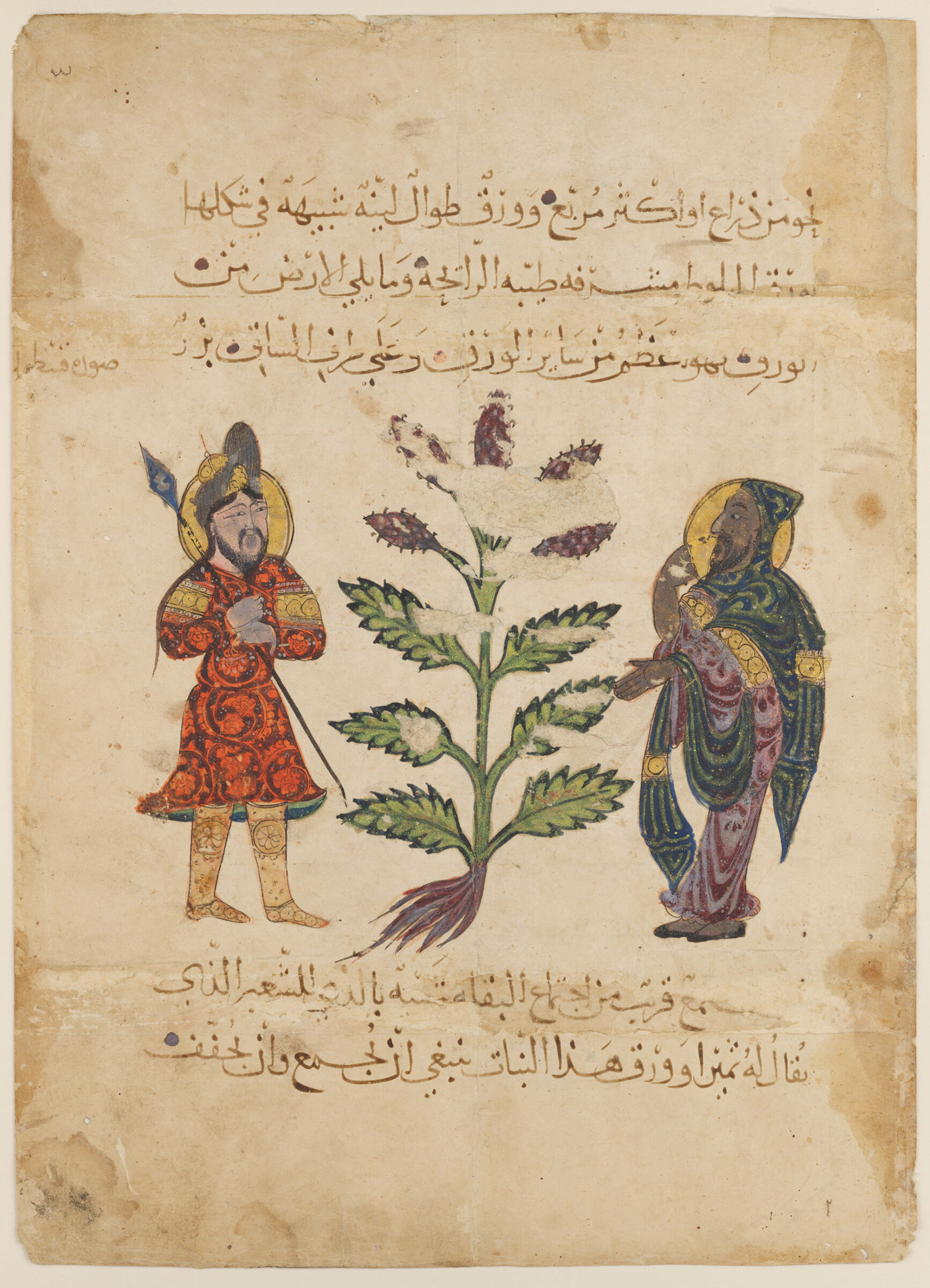
Warrior and Physician with the Plant Kestron.

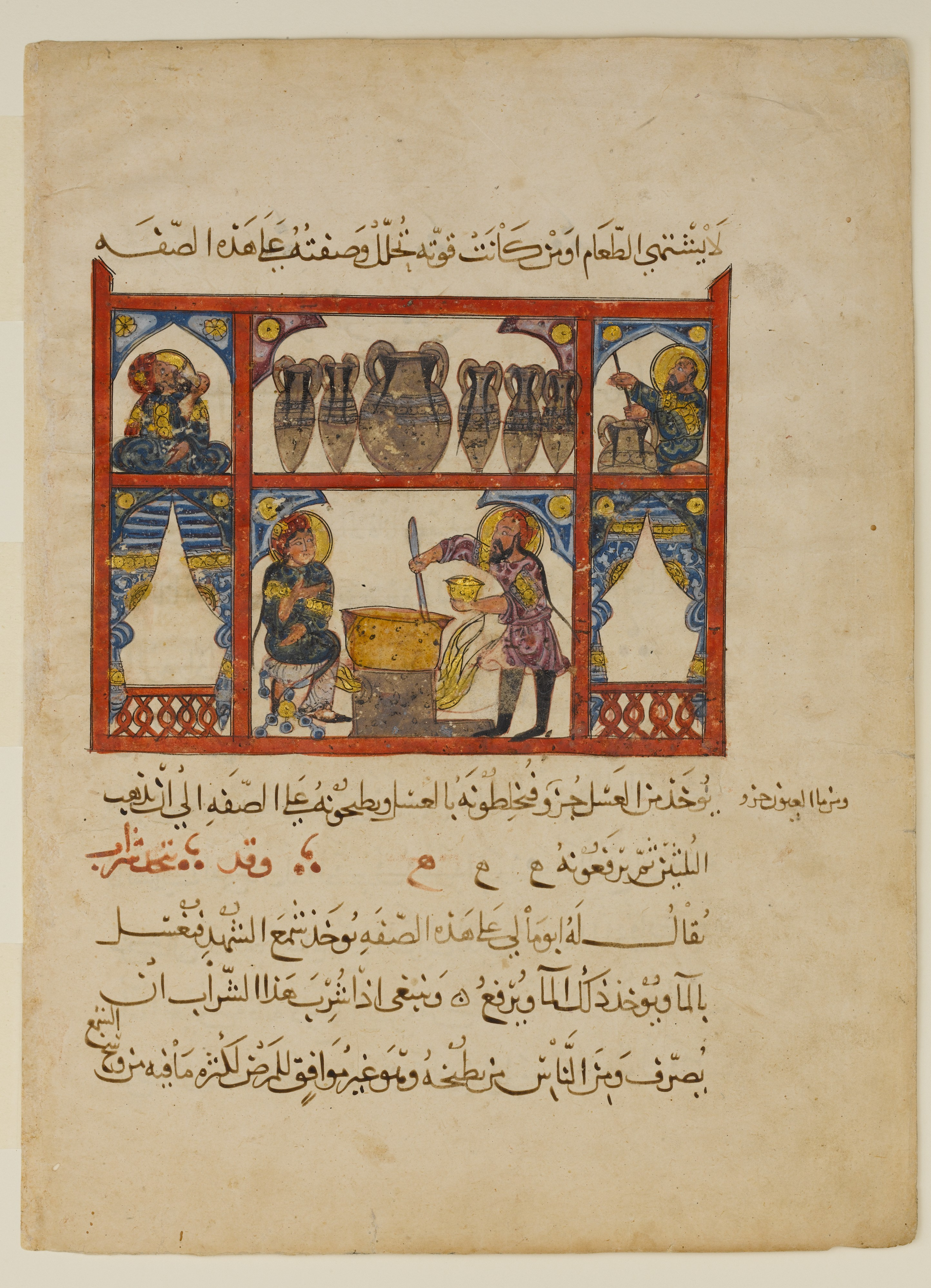
Preparing Medecine from Honey.

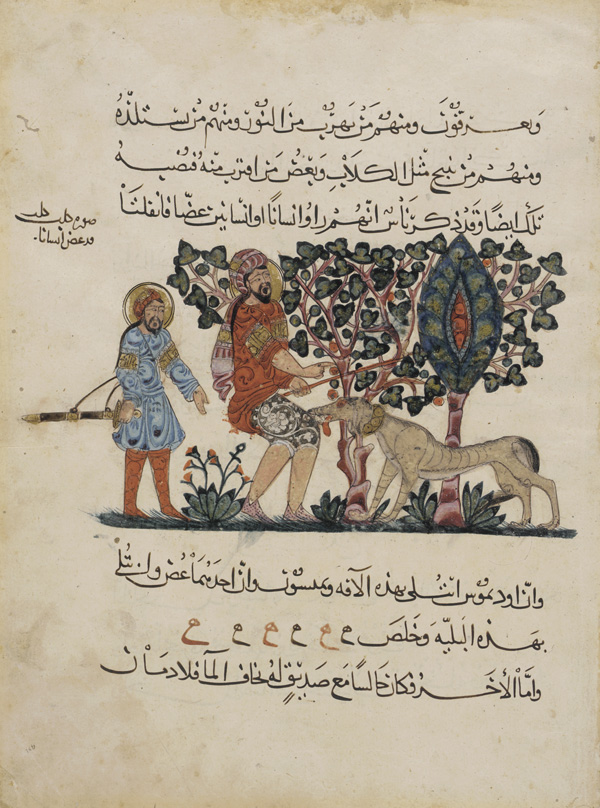
Outdoor Scene of A Mad Dog Biting a Man.

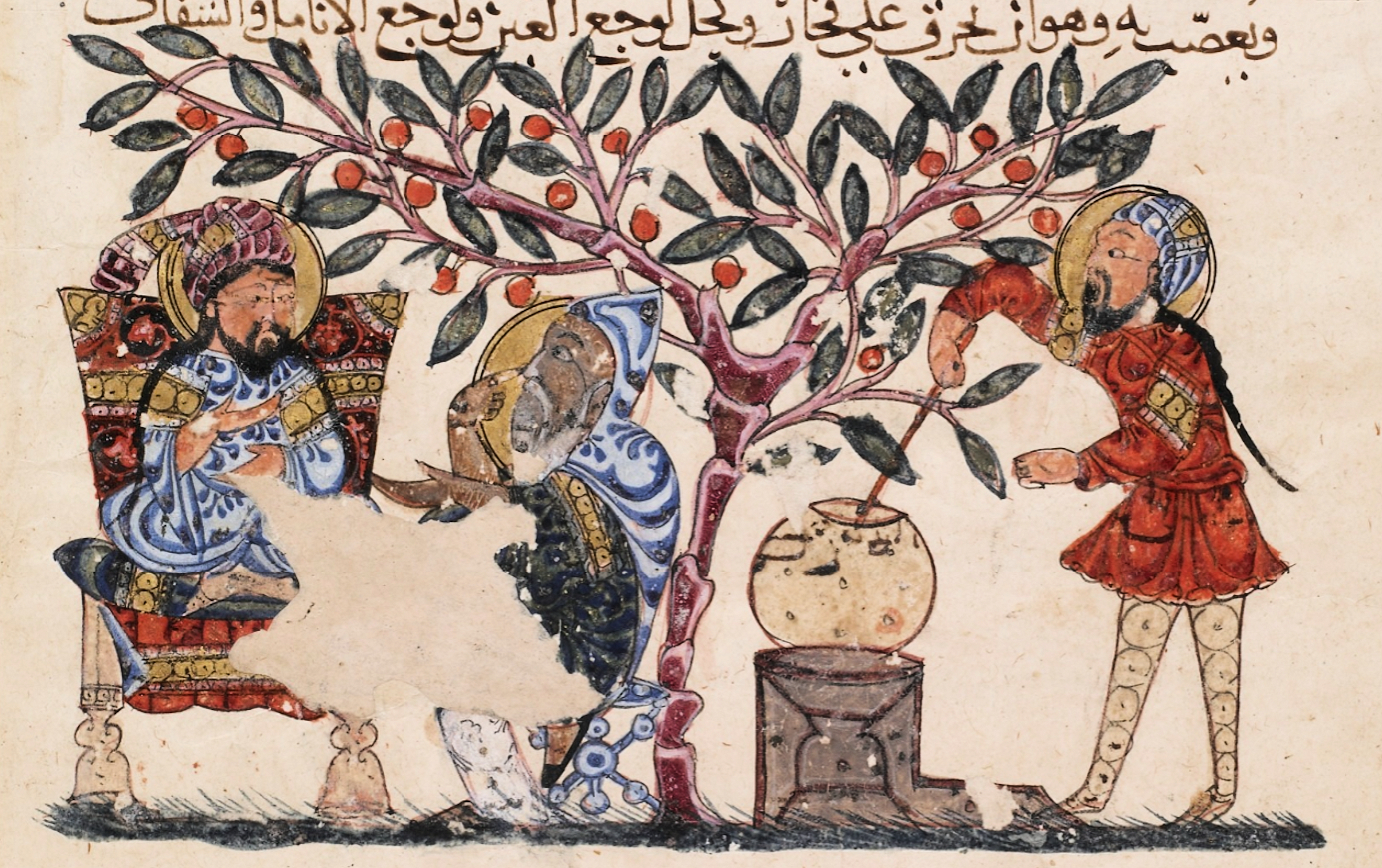
Preparation of medicine from the flower of the wild vine.

==== Istanbul, Topkapı Palace, Ahmet II 2127 (1229) ====
This copy was created by Abd Al-Jabbar ibn Ali in 1229.

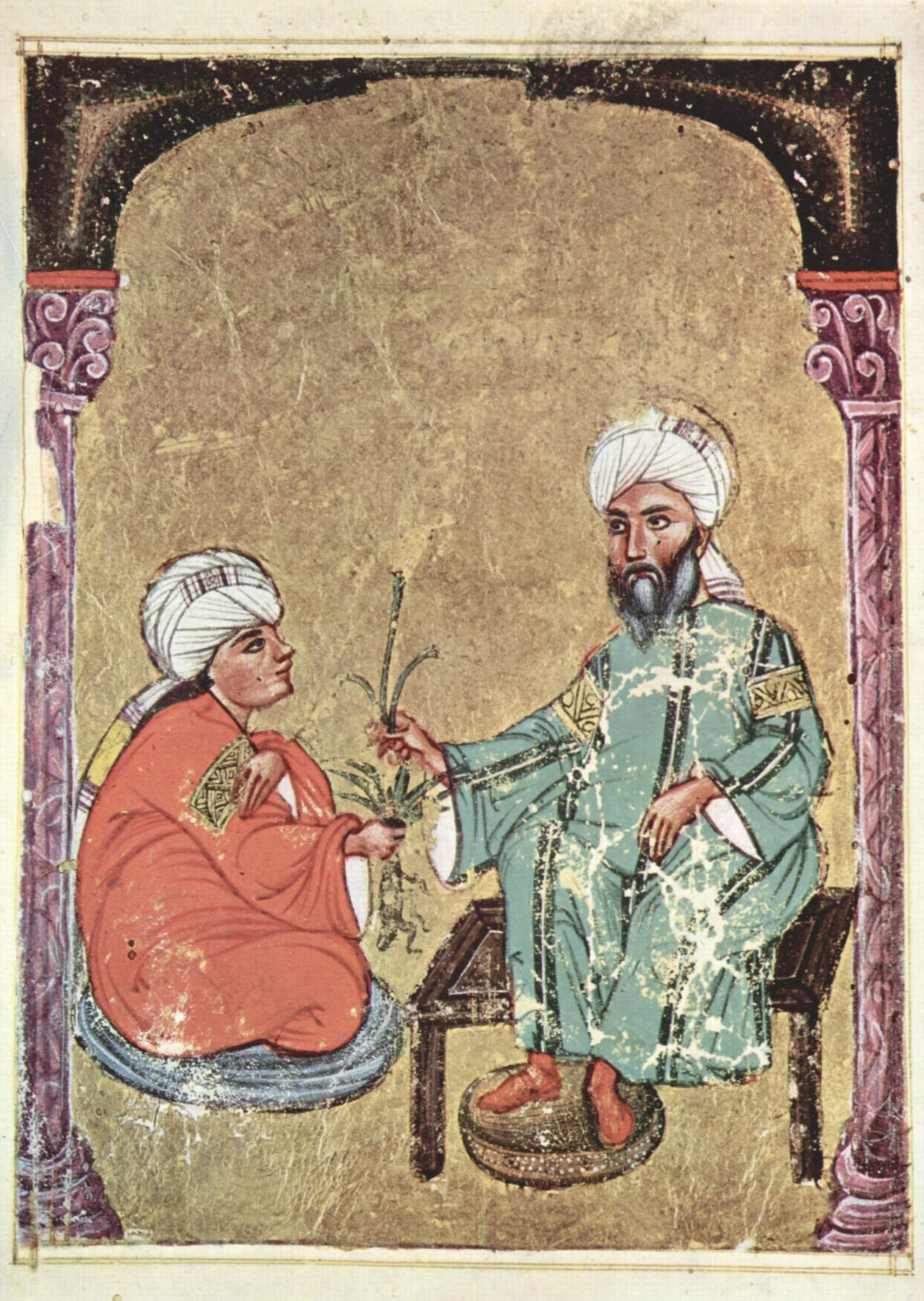
Folio from an Arabic manuscript of De materia medica, 1229

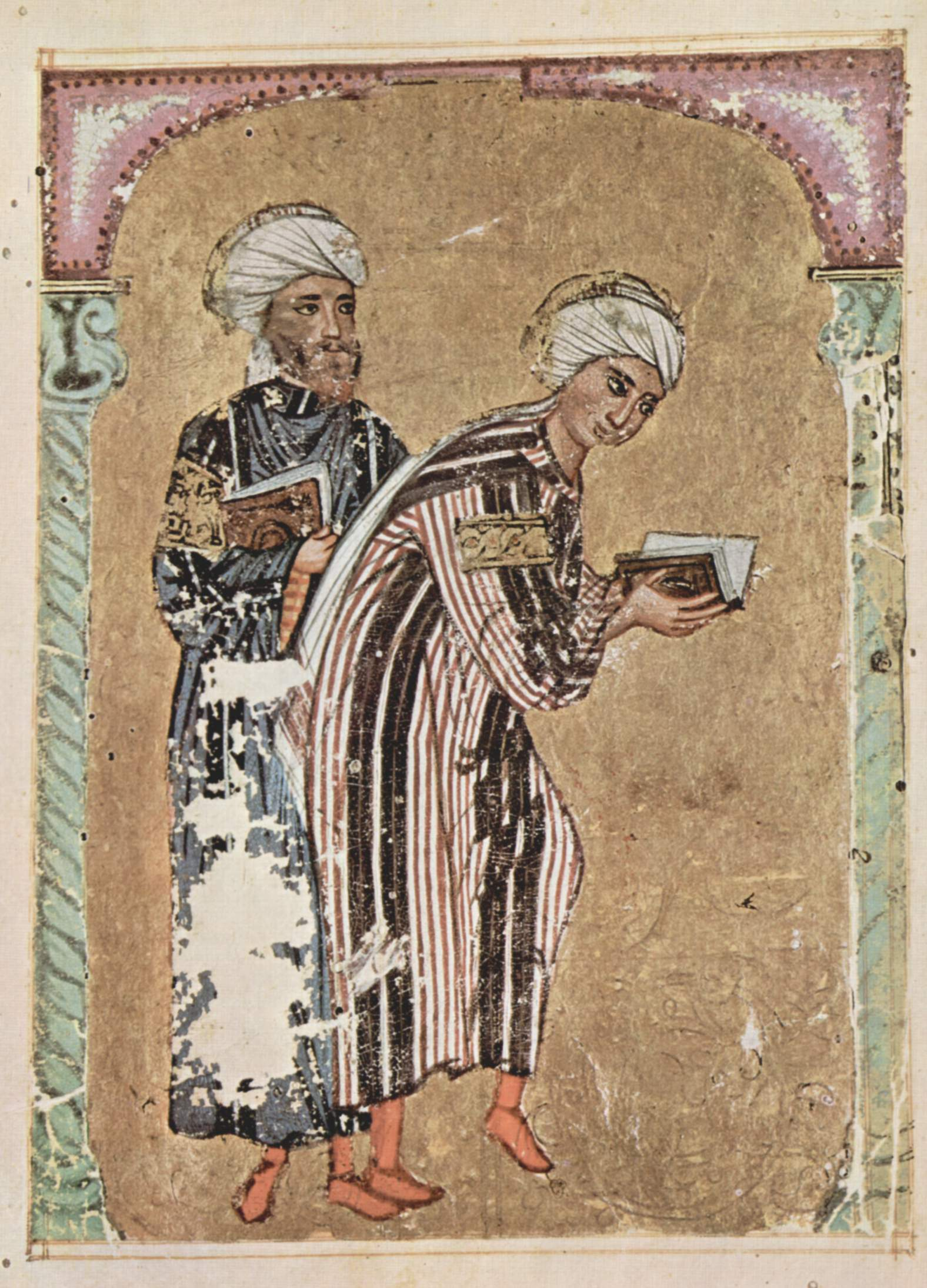
Folio from an Arabic manuscript of De materia medica, 1229

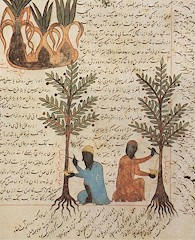
Arboriculture scene, 1229

== See also ==
- Jean Ruel

== Cited sources ==
- Boas, Marie (1962). The Scientific Renaissance 1450–1630. Fontana. p. 47.
- Nutton, Vivian (2012). Ancient Medicine (2 ed.). Routledge. Archived from the original on 2016-03-27 – via Questia.
- Sutton, David (2007). "Pedanios Dioscorides: Recording the Medicinal Uses of Plants". In Robert Huxley (ed.). The Great Naturalists. London: Thames & Hudson, with the Natural History Museum. pp. 32–37. ISBN 978-0-500-25139-3.
