= Crateuas (physician) =

Ancient Greek doctor and pharmacologist

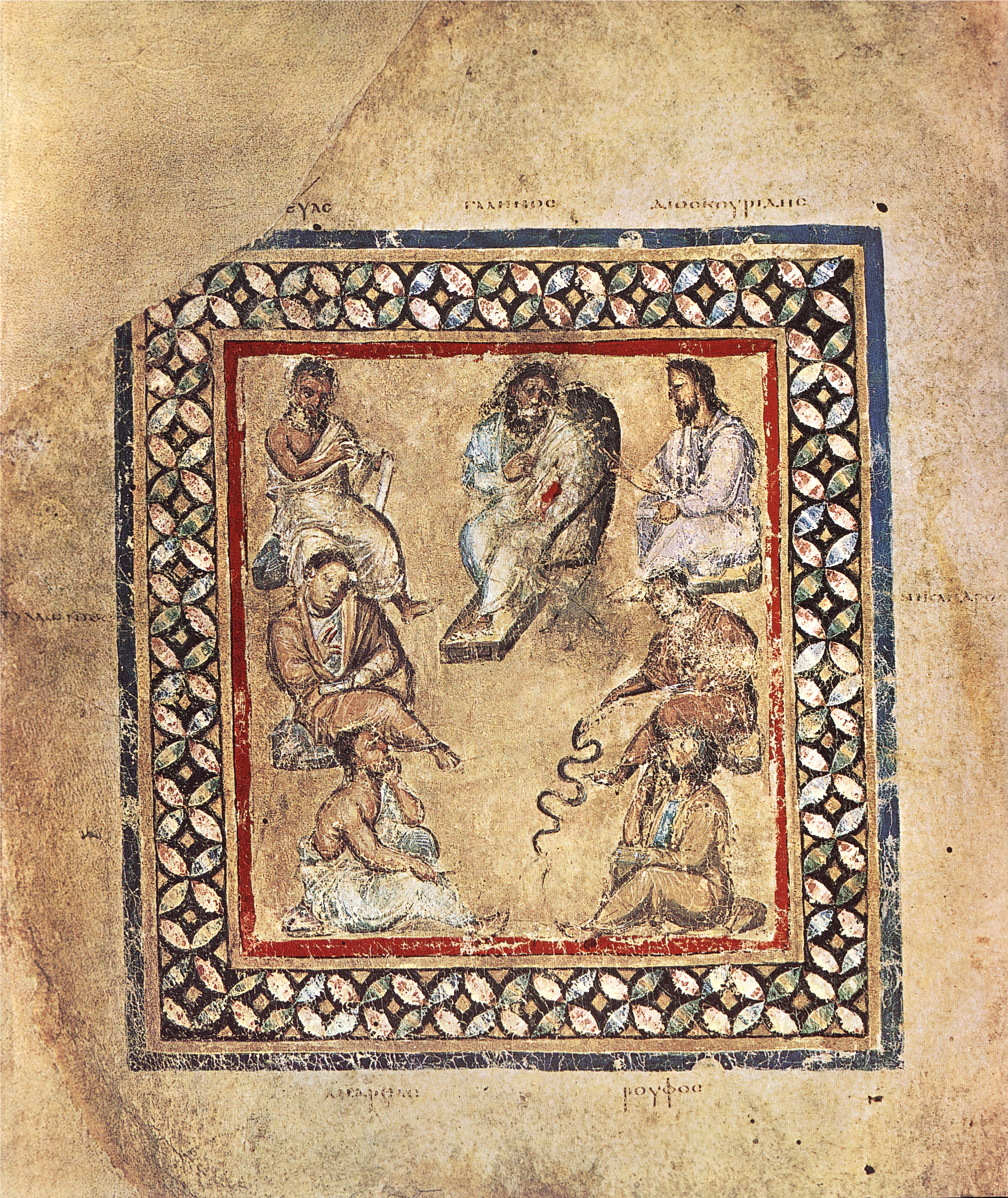
The second miniature of doctors in the Vienna Dioscurides. Crateuas is in the top left beside Galen.

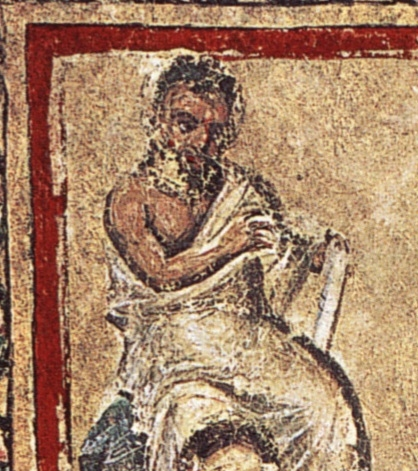
Krateuas is in close up.

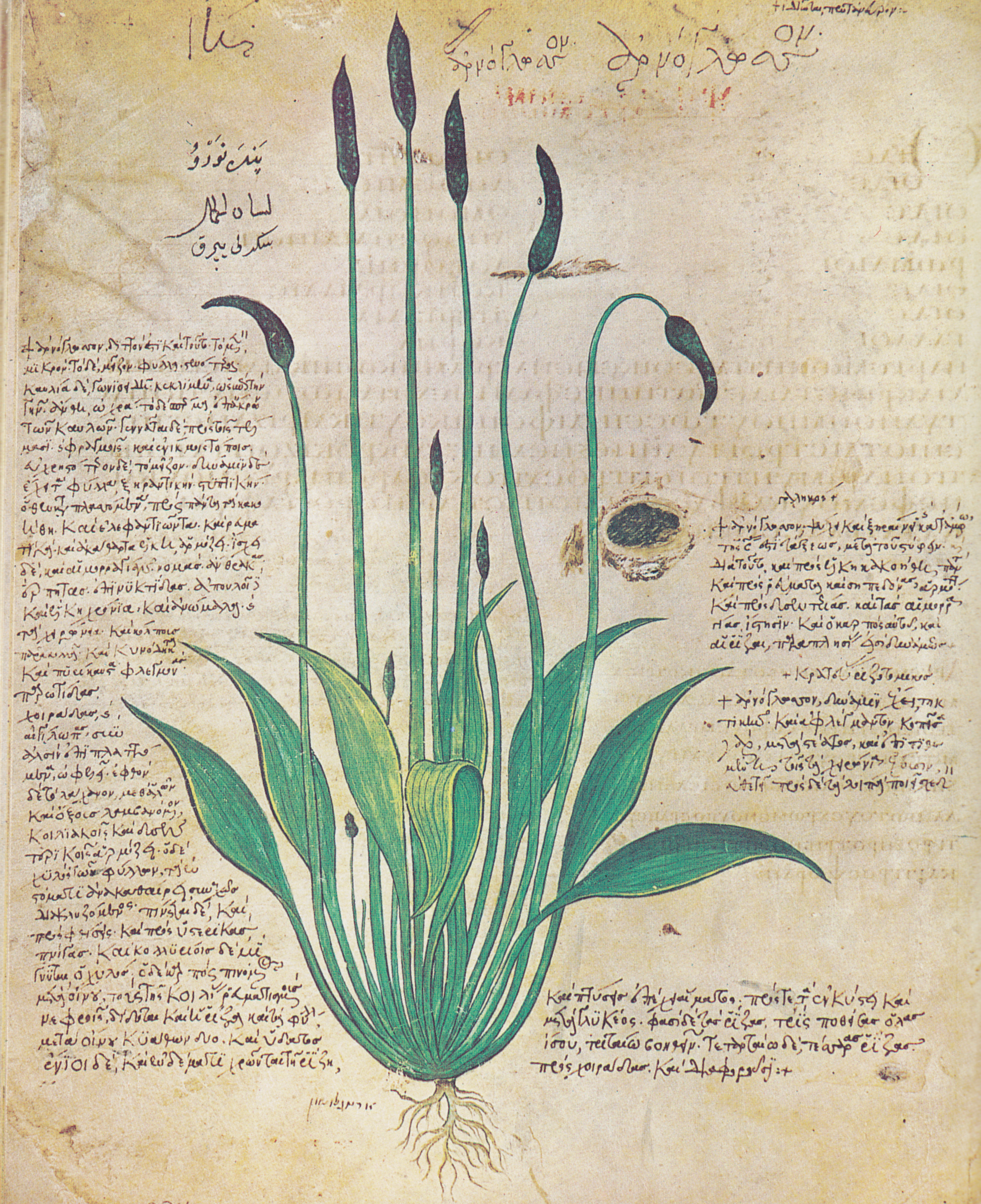
Image of P. lanceolata (lamb's tongue) in the Vienna Dioscurides, an example of a possible copy from manuscripts of Krateuas's work.

Crateuas (111–64 BC), also known as Cratevas (Latin), Krateuas, or Kratevas (Ancient Greek: Κρατεύας), was a Greek doctor, pharmacologist, and friend of Mithradates VI Eupator. He was distinguished from others of the same name by the epithet "Rootpicker" or "Rhizotomist" (ὁ ῥιζοτόμος, ho rhizotómos) after the Greek name of his principal work, the Herbology.

== Life ==
Little is known of Crateuas's life. Although he is often closely linked with Mithridates VI of Pontus in various histories, (Note: See, e.g., Lopez's Medicine and Oncology.) surviving sources from antiquity only attest that they were in correspondence with one another and that Crateuas credited the Pontic king with the discovery of a plant named mithridation in his honour. The exact plant described remains unknown, although some scholars have connected it to Dorstenia tambourissa or Erythronium denscanis.

== Works ==
Crateuas is known to have written a scholarly three-volume herbal in Greek known as the Rhizotomica (τὰ Ῥιζοτομούμενα, Rhizotomoúmena). In it, he described the medicinal properties of various plants known to the Greeks. He also produced a simplified work on the same subject for general readers, with the plants alphabetized and illustrated in colour. Pliny the Elder credits Crateuas with Dionysius and Metrodorus as the first to provide such illustrations with their descriptions of various plants, although he complains that the images he knew of were frequently misleading. Only two direct fragments of these works are known to have survived into the present day. Luigi Anguillara claimed to have consulted a complete illustrated manuscript of Crateuas's guide in Istanbul for his 1561 Semplici, although Max Wellmann subsequently established that Anguillara's source must have been a Latin version of Dioscurides's De Materia Medica.

The Rhizotomica was well regarded in its time, however, and was one of the main sources for Dioscurides's work, which was the primary herbology for Europe during the Middle Ages. The early 6th century "Vienna Dioscurides" produced for Anicia Juliana in Constantinople includes numerous images captioned with short texts beginning with the name Crateuas. Wellmann and Singer believed these were based on now-lost manuscripts of Crateuas dating to the 2nd or 3rd century, although others have argued that it may only be the text which derives from Crateuas's work.

== Legacy ==
Linnaeus named a genus of Capparaceae capers Crateva in memory of Crateuas.
