= Naples Dioscurides =

7th-century illuminated manuscript Greek herbal

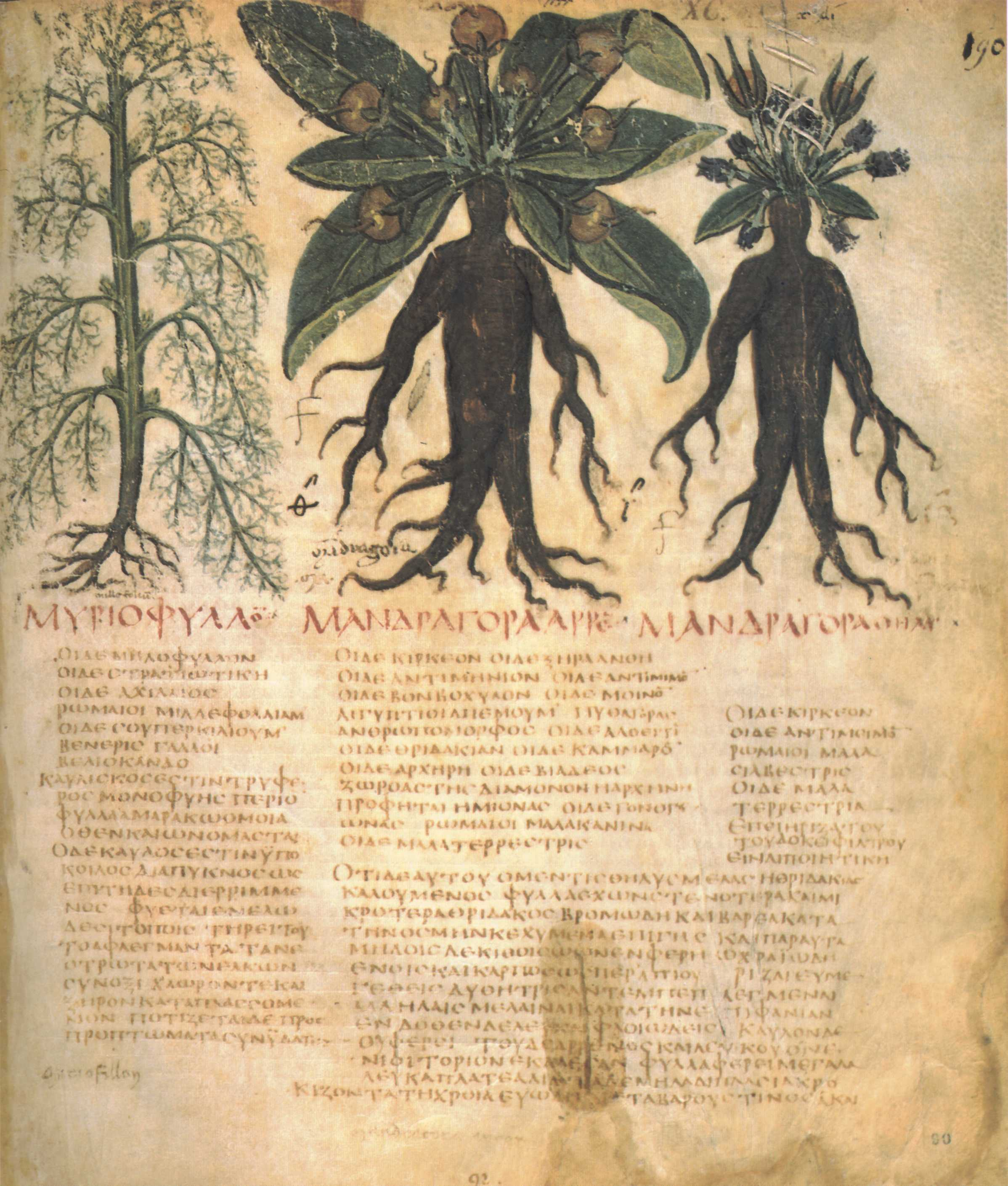
- Provenance: Biblioteca Nazionale
- Series: Dioscurides
- Codex ex Vindobonensis Graecus 1
- Subject: Herbology
- Period covered: 7th Century

The Naples Dioscurides, in the Biblioteca Nazionale, Naples (MS Suppl. gr. 28), is an early 7th-century secular illuminated manuscript Greek herbal. The book has 172 folios and a page size of 29.7 x 14 cm (11 11/16 x 5 1/2 inches) and the text is a redaction of De Materia Medica by the 1st century Greek military physician Dioscorides, with descriptions of plants and their medicinal uses. Unlike De Materia Medica, the text is arranged alphabetically by plant.

The patron who commissioned it and the craftsmen who worked on the manuscript have not been identified. The style of Greek script used in the manuscript indicates that it was probably written in Byzantine-ruled southern Italy, where ancient Greek cultural traditions remained strong, although it is not known exactly where it was produced.

The codex derives independently from the same model as the Vienna Dioscurides, which was created ca. 512 for a Byzantine princess, but differs from it significantly. Additionally, in the Naples manuscript, the illustrations occupy the top half of each folio, rather than being full page miniatures as in the Vienna Dioscurides. The script is somewhat rough and uneven, and the painting style of the miniatures less precise and naturalistic than the Vienna manuscript, indicating a certain falling-off in standards.

== History ==
=== Origin ===
The Naples Dioscurides is derived from the first-century manuscript De Materia Medica, written by Pedanius Dioscorides, a Greek physician in the Roman army. De Materia Medica was an encyclopedia focused on medicines that could be derived from herbs, plants, minerals, and animals. It was widely distributed throughout the ancient Mediterranean, and remained in use for centuries. Despite the fall of the Western Roman Empire, its Eastern counterpart remained strong, keeping the traditions of Rome alive. By the time of the writing of the Naples Dioscurides, the manuscript had remained popular amongst the Byzantines and the newly powerful Islamic Empires. The secular subject of De Materia Medica kept the overall Christianization of Europe from significantly affecting the manuscript. Art historians can study the original De Materia Medica through medieval manuscripts (though the Naples Dioscurides is not an exact copy).

De Materia Medica was still a highly influential manuscript, and by the seventh century, was still being widely read by the Byzantine Empire and their satellite states. One of these states, the Duchy of Naples, retained a Greek-influenced culture. The population spoke and wrote in Greek, a reference to Naples's roots as an Ancient Greek colony.

=== Attribution ===
The scribe and the illuminator behind the Naples Dioscurides are lost to history. What is known is quite limited, though this is common with many manuscripts. Art historians believe the manuscript was manufactured in Italy, around the beginning of the early seventh century. However, its geographical origin in Italy is unclear, though likely an area of Italy strongly influenced by Byzantium. The manuscript is written in Ancient Greek, which was still a language spoken in the Duchy of Naples.

=== Provenance ===
For several centuries, the Naples Dioscurides was held at the Augustine monastery, San Giovanni a Carbonara in the Kingdom of Naples.

Marginal notes indicate that the manuscript had contact with the medical school at Salerno in the fourteenth and fifteenth centuries.

The manuscript was taken to Vienna in 1718 by the Holy Roman Empire, which controlled the Kingdom of Naples following the Treaty of Rastatt of 1714. The Naples Dioscurides was then housed in the Viennese Court Library, owned by the ruling Habsburg Dynasty.

The Naples Dioscurides was preserved at the Viennese Court Library for 200 years, and was returned to Naples in 1919. The manuscript was returned to the Kingdom of Italy by the Austro-Hungarian monarch following the peace talks of World War I. It was returned to the Biblioteca Nazionale, where it is kept today.

The Naples Dioscurides was exhibited at the Metropolitan Museum of Art in a show entitled, "Byzantium and Islam: Age of Transition," from March 12, 2012- July 8, 2012.

A luxurious facsimile has been published by Salerno Editrice, Rome, in collaboration with Akademische Druck of Graz, Austria, publishers of a comparable facsimile of the Vienna Dioscurides.

== Description ==
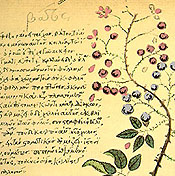
Vienna Dioscurides Wild Blackberry

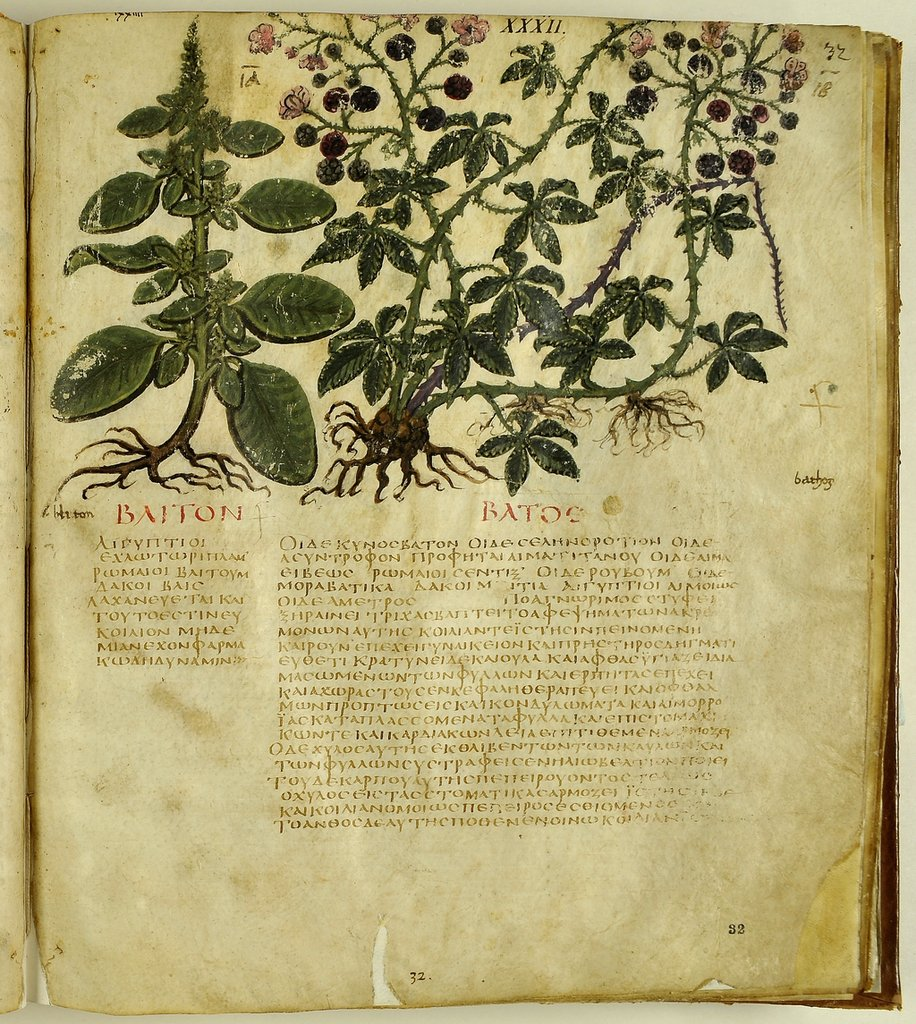
Blite and blackberry Naples Dioscorides 65

The Naples Dioscurides comprises 172 folios with an approximate page size of 29.7 x 14 cm (11 11/16 x 5 1/2 inches). Not all folios are exactly the same size. The medium of the Naples Dioscurides is ink and parchment on vellum. The arrangement of the manuscript differs from the original De Materia Medica heavily. Whereas the De Materia Medica features plants, animals, and minerals, the Naples Dioscurides only features plants. It should also be noted that instead of five volumes, the Naples Dioscurides is only one. Unlike other Dioscurides, the Naples Dioscurides lists plants in alphabetical order, more in keeping with the format of a manual than the original. The plant descriptions are recorded below the illustration in two or three rather narrow columns, recalling the arrangement the earliest scroll version of the work would have had, before the codex form became near-universal.

=== Composition ===
The composition of the Naples Dioscurides differs greatly from its predecessor, De Materia Medica, and its contemporary, the Vienna Dioscurides. The Vienna Dioscurides is closer to the original text than the Naples Dioscurides. It also predates the Naples Dioscurides by one hundred years. The Vienna Dioscurides retains descriptions of animal and mineral medicine. It also differs in that it includes references to Pedanius Dioscorides through two author portraits, which are absent on the Naples Dioscurides. In fact, other copies of the Dioscurides are all much closer to the original, with only the Naples example as the outlier. Another major difference between the manuscripts is the way they are illustrated. The Naples Dioscurides features illustrations that take up one-half to two-thirds of the page. The uses of the plants are written underneath. The illustrations of the Vienna Dioscurides are full page illustrations, in contrast.

A possible reason why the Naples Dioscurides only features plant information may lie with its intended use. Rather than focus on wonderfully illustrated pictures and artistic value, as the Vienna Dioscurides does, the Naples Dioscurides may have had a more practical purpose. A competing explanation for the manuscript states that it was intended as a manual rather than a gift or as part of a royal collection. This theory has some weight to it, given the fact that its sister manuscript, the Vienna Dioscurides, was manufactured for a Byzantine princess and was housed in a royal library. The Vienna Dioscurides is more richly illustrated and decorated compared to the Naples Dioscurides. The images of the Naples Dioscurides were painted naturalistically in contrast to the images of the Vienna Dioscurides. In contrast, the Naples Dioscurides was housed in a monastery, where it most likely would have served a practical purpose as a plant guide for monks. The manuscript may also have been used in the education of doctors, as marginal notes indicate that it was loaned to the Medical School of Salerno.Director of the Royal Botanic Garden, Kew, Sir Arthur Hill noted the fact that some copies of the Dioscurides held by monasteries were still actively used by the nineteenth century. With this in mind, it would appear that the Naples Dioscurides most likely served a practical purpose as a book to be read and used, rather than as a gift for royalty.

== Gallery ==
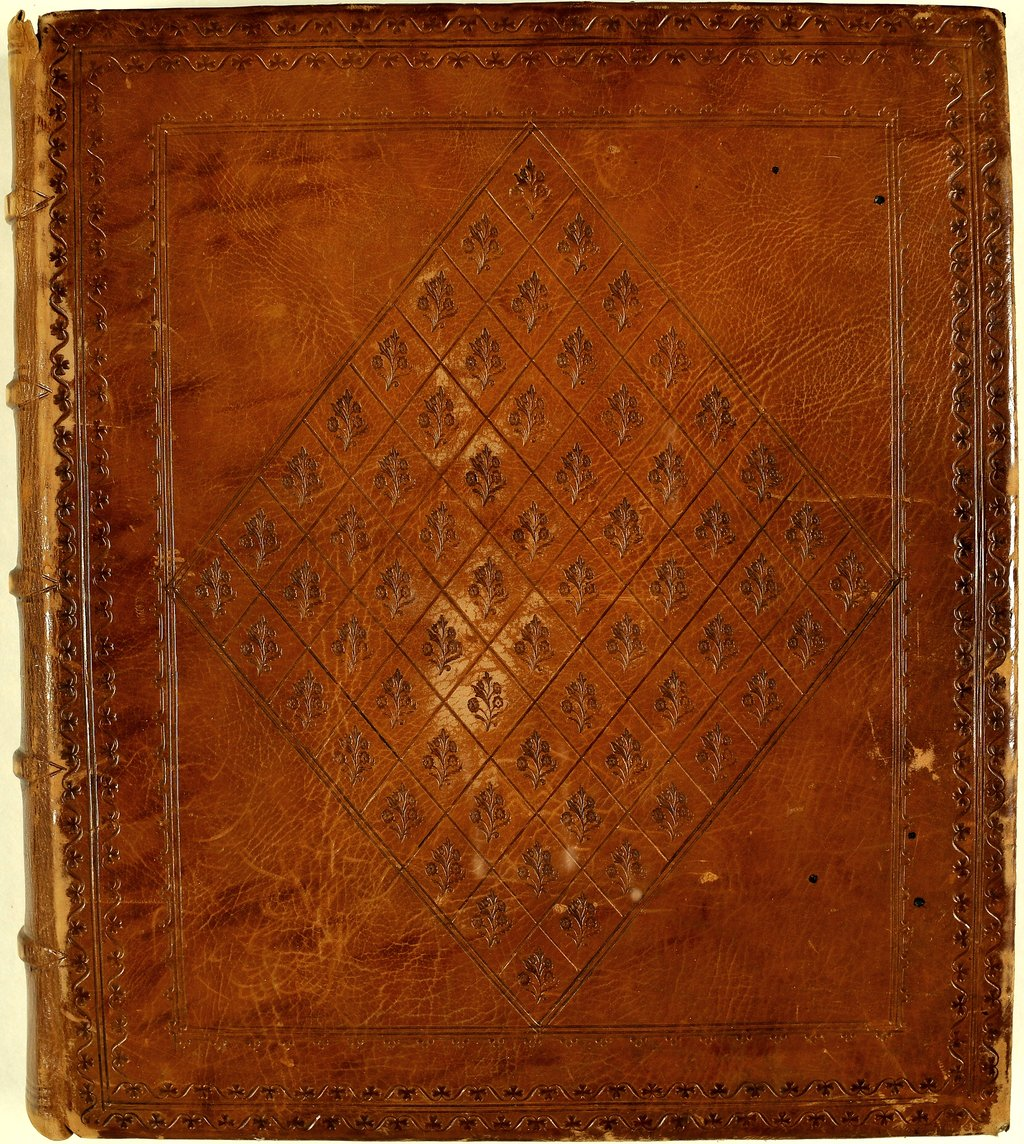
Leather Binding of the Naples Dioscurides

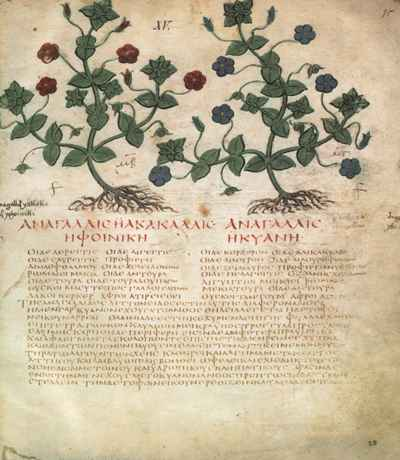
Anagallis, also known as Pimpernel

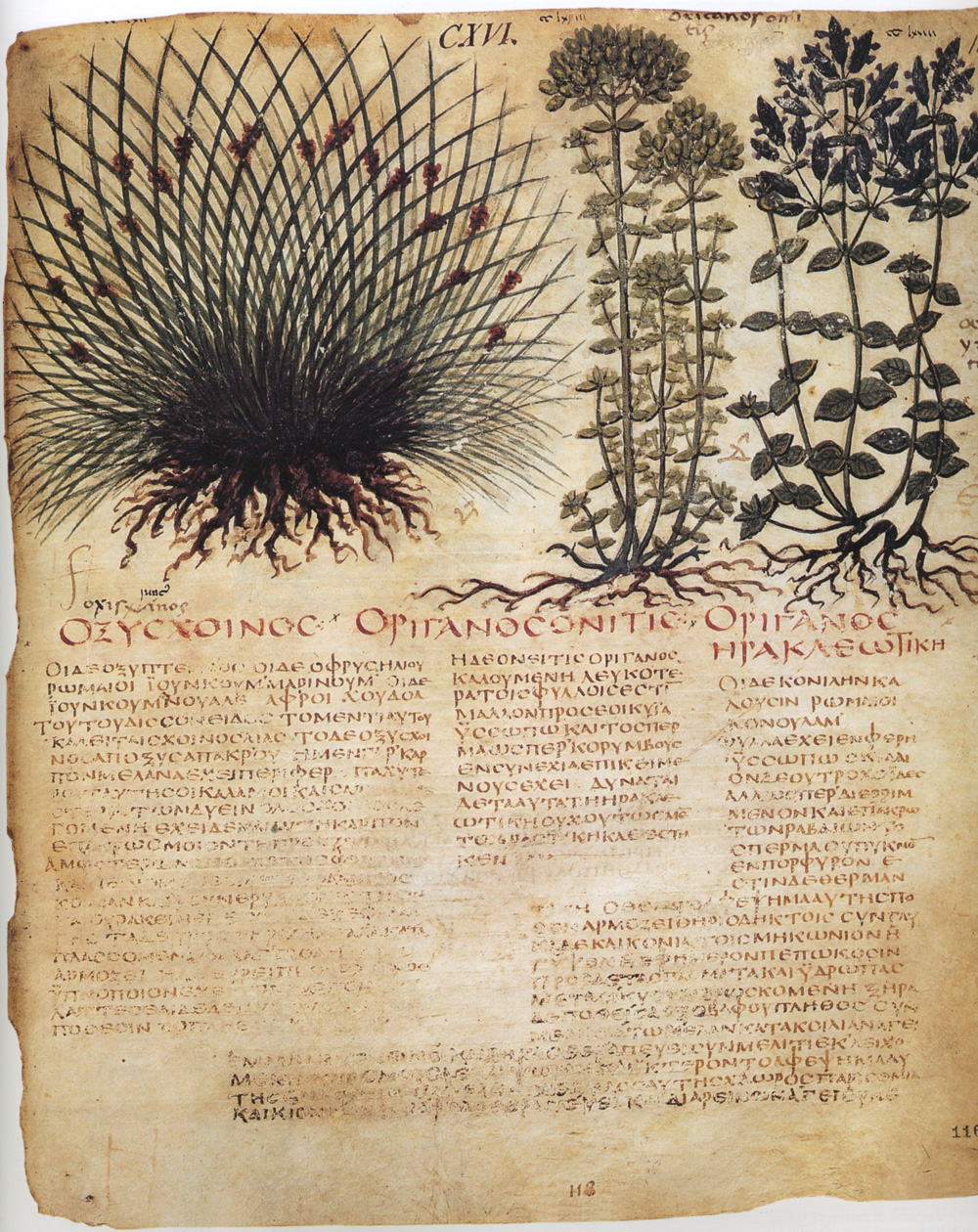
Assorted Plants
