= Vienna Dioscurides =

Book by Pedanius Dioscorides

- Österreichische Nationalbibliothek, Vienna
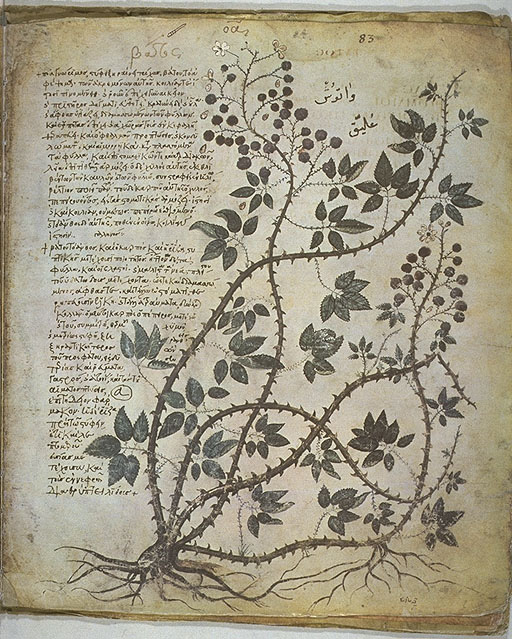
- Folio 83r Rubus fruticosus (bramble)
- Also known as: Juliana Anicia Codex; Codex Vindobonensis med. gr. 1
- Type: Illustrated manuscript (medical)
- Date: c. 512–515
- Place of origin: Constantinople, Byzantine Empire
- Language(s): Greek (uncial; later minuscule additions)
- Scribe: Unrecorded
- Author(s): Pedanius Dioscorides (original text, 1st century AD)
- Patron: Anicia Juliana
- Material: Parchment (vellum), ink, pigments
- Size: 37 × 30 cm
- Format: Codex
- Condition: Largely preserved; restored and rebound in 1406
- Script: Greek uncial (main text); Greek minuscule (later scholia)
- Contents: De materia medica; Carmen de viribus herbarum; paraphrases of Nicander's Theriaca and Alexipharmaca; Dionysius of Philadelphia's Ornithiaca; Oppian's Halieutica
- Illumination(s): Plants, animals, physicians, and allegorical figures
- Additions: Multilingual plant names (Greek, Latin, Arabic, Hebrew, Old French); scholia and table of contents added in 1406
- Exemplar(s): Classical herbals and painted panel models
- Previously kept: Constantinople (c. 6th–16th centuries)
- Other: Oldest surviving illustrated copy of De materia medica; UNESCO Memory of the World Register (1997)

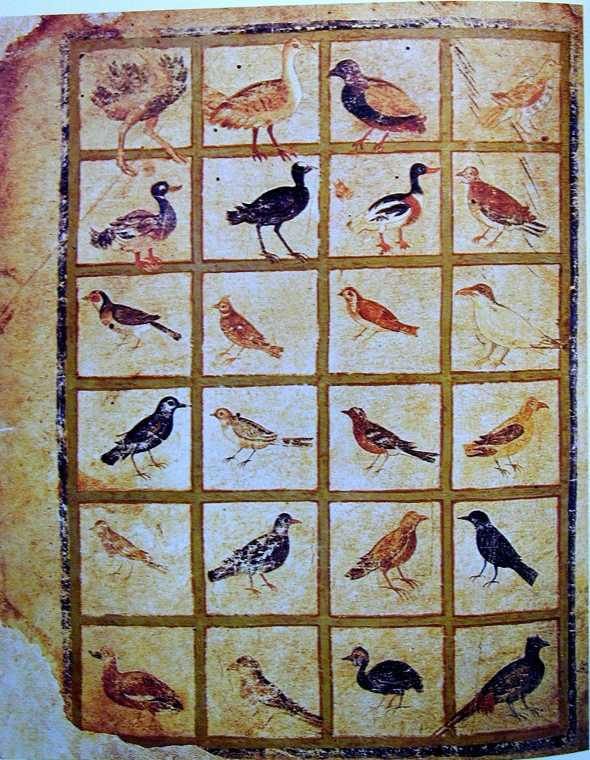
A gallery of birds from folio 483v of the Vienna Dioscorides

The Vienna Dioscurides or Vienna Dioscorides is an early 6th-century Byzantine Greek illuminated manuscript of an even earlier 1st century AD work, De materia medica (Ancient Greek: Περὶ ὕλης ἰατρικῆς, romanized: Perì hylēs iatrikēs) by Pedanius Dioscorides in uncial script. It is an important and rare example of a late antique scientific text. After residing in Constantinople for just over a thousand years, the text passed to the Holy Roman Emperor in Vienna in the 16th century, a century after the city fell to the Ottoman Empire.

The 491 vellum folios measure 37 cm (15 in) by 30 cm (12 in) and contain more than 400 pictures of animals and plants, most done in a naturalistic style. In addition to the text by Dioscorides, the manuscript has appended to it, the Carmen de herbis attributed to Rufus, a paraphrase of an ornithological treatise by a certain Dionysius, usually identified with Dionysius of Philadelphia, and a paraphrase of Nicander's treatise on the treatment of snake bites.

== History ==
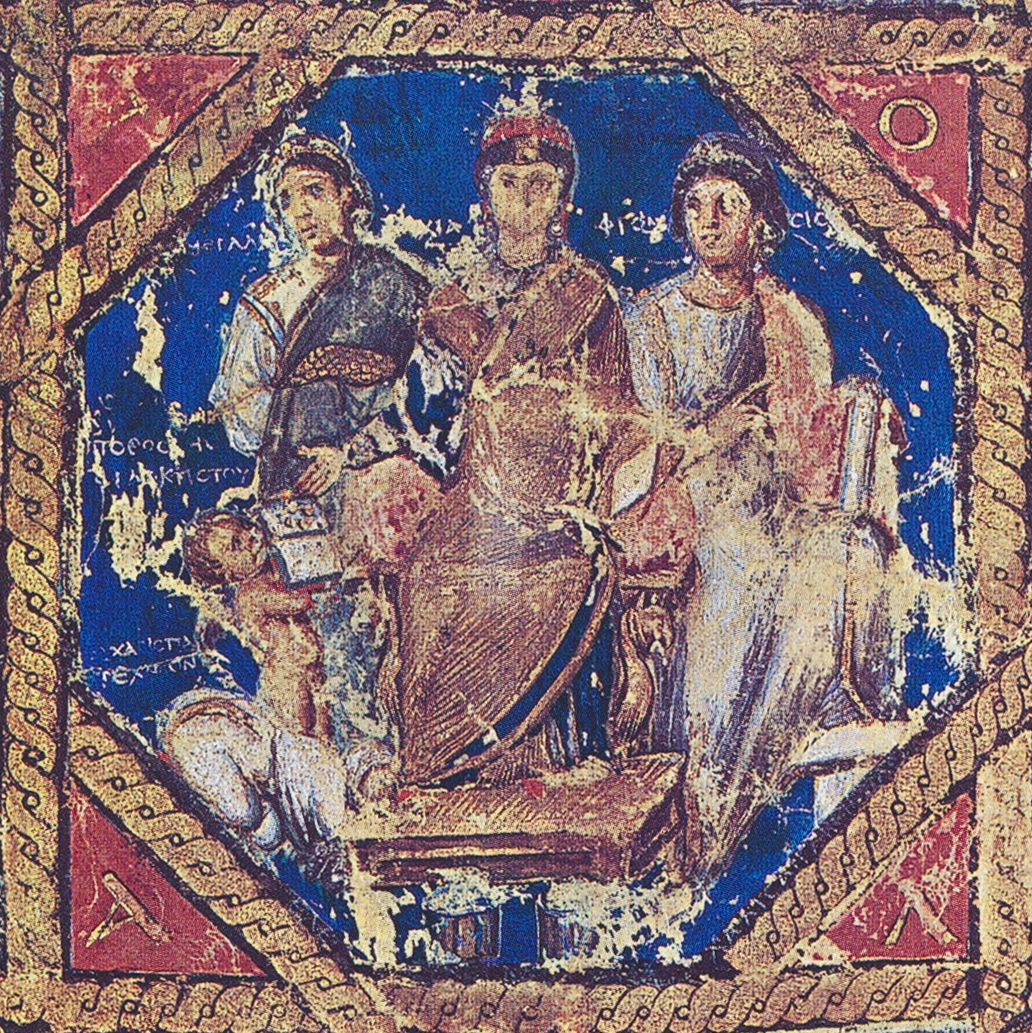
Portrait of Anicia Juliana, for whom the book was made, flanked by Megalopsychia and Phronesis (detail from folio 6v)

The manuscript was created in about 515 AD in the Byzantine (Eastern Roman) Empire's capital, Constantinople, for a resident Byzantine imperial princess, Anicia Juliana, the daughter of Anicius Olybrius (one of the last of the Western Roman Emperors). The manuscript is accordingly now called the Juliana Anicia Codex by scholars. Although it was created as a luxury copy, in later centuries it was used daily as a textbook in the imperial hospital of Constantinople, and a medieval note records that a Greek nurse there, named Nathanael, had it rebound in 1406.

Throughout the Byzantine period the manuscript was used as the original for copies of the work that were given to foreign leaders, including the Arabic edition of Abd al-Rahman III of Spain for the creation of which the Byzantine Emperor Constantine VII sent a Greek copy and a translator. A note recording the name of one Michael of the Varangian Guard is also found in the text.

The manuscript was restored and a table of contents and extensive scholia added in Byzantine Greek minuscule, by the patriarchal notary John Chortasmenos in 1406. In the mid-15th century, it was used to create the Pope Alexander VII Dioscorides, now in the Vatican Library, by the monks of St. John the Baptist Greek orthodox monastery in Constantinople. After the fall of Constantinople in 1453 a subsequent owner handwrote each plant's name in Arabic and Hebrew. The manuscript, still in Istanbul a century after the fall of the city, was purchased from Moses Hamon, the Arabic-speaking, Jewish physician to Sultan Suleiman the Magnificent, by the Flemish diplomat Ogier Ghiselin de Busbecq, who was in the employ of Emperor Ferdinand I of the Austrian Habsburgs. The manuscript is now held among the manuscripts of the Austrian National Library (German: Österreichische Nationalbibliothek) in Vienna, where it is identified as the Codex Vindobonensis med. gr. 1. The manuscript was inscribed on UNESCO's Memory of the World international register in 1997 in recognition of its historical significance.

== Illustrations ==
The manuscript has 383 extant full-page illustrations of plants out of the original 435 illustrations. The illustrations fall into two groups. There are those that faithfully follow earlier classical models and present a quite naturalistic illustration of each plant. There are also other illustrations that are more abstract. The majority of the illustrations were painted in a naturalistic style so as to aid a pharmacologist in the recognition of each plant. However, it is believed that these illustrations were made as copies of an earlier herbal and were not drawn from nature.

In addition to the illustrations of the text, the manuscript contains several frontispieces in the form of a series of full-page miniatures. Of special note is the dedication miniature portrait of Anicia Juliana on folio 6 verso. The manuscript was presented to Anicia out of gratitude for her funding the construction of a church in the suburbs of Constantinople. This portrait is the oldest extant dedication portrait. The portrait has Anicia seated in a ceremonial pose distributing alms. She is flanked by personifications of Megalopsychia (magnanimity) and Phronesis (prudence). At her feet, another personification, labeled "Gratitude of the Arts", kneels. A putto holds a dedication copy up to Anicia. Anicia and her attendants are enclosed within an eight-point star within a circle all formed of intertwined rope. Within the outer spandrels of the star are putti, done in grisaille, working as masons and carpenters. This miniature is an altogether original creation and, with the inclusion of the personifications and the putti, shows the endurance of the classical tradition in Constantinople, despite the fact that Anicia herself was a pious Christian.

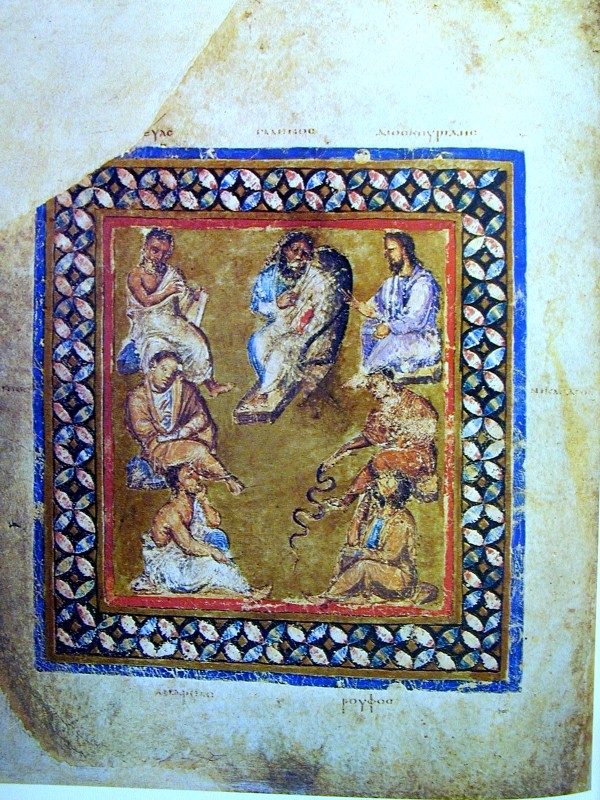
Folio 3v, seven physicians

The series of frontispieces in the manuscript begins with two full-page miniatures, each having a group of seven noted pharmacologists. In the second picture (folio 3 verso, see here), the most prominent and only one sitting on a chair is Galen. He is flanked by three pairs of other physicians, seated on stones or the ground. Closest to Galen are Crateuas and Dioscurides. The second pair are Apollonius Mys and Nicander. Farthest from Galen are Andreas and Rufus of Ephesus. Each of the figures is a self-contained portrait and was probably modeled on authors' portraits from the various authors' treatises. The seven figures are contained within an elaborate decorated frame. The background is solid gold, which places the figures in an abstract space. This is the earliest known manuscript to use a solid gold background.

Following the two miniatures of seven pharmacologists, there are two author portraits. In the second portrait (see here), Dioscurides sits writing in a codex on his lap. He is shown in profile, which corresponds to the portrait in the previous miniature. It is possible that there was a tradition based on Dioscurides' life portrait that the images are based on. In front of Dioscurides is an artist, seated at a lower level, painting an illustration of the mandrake root. He is painting from nature. The mandrake root he is looking at is held by the personification of Epinoia (the power of thought). There is architectural background consisting of a colonnade with a central niche.

The paraphrase of the treatise on birds by Dionysius is in three books. The first two books have illustrations of the birds inserted into the text columns without frame or background (for example, see here). The third book has 24 birds arranged in a grid on a full-page miniature (see illustration above). The birds portrayed throughout the treatise are of high artistic merit and are faithful to nature in form and color. Most of the birds are easily identifiable. Some of the birds contained in the full-page miniature in the third book are not described in the text of the paraphrase. It is probable that these illustrations are based on the illustrations from an older, different treatise, possibly that of Alexander of Myndus. This manuscript, however, is the oldest surviving illustrated treatise on birds.

== Gallery ==
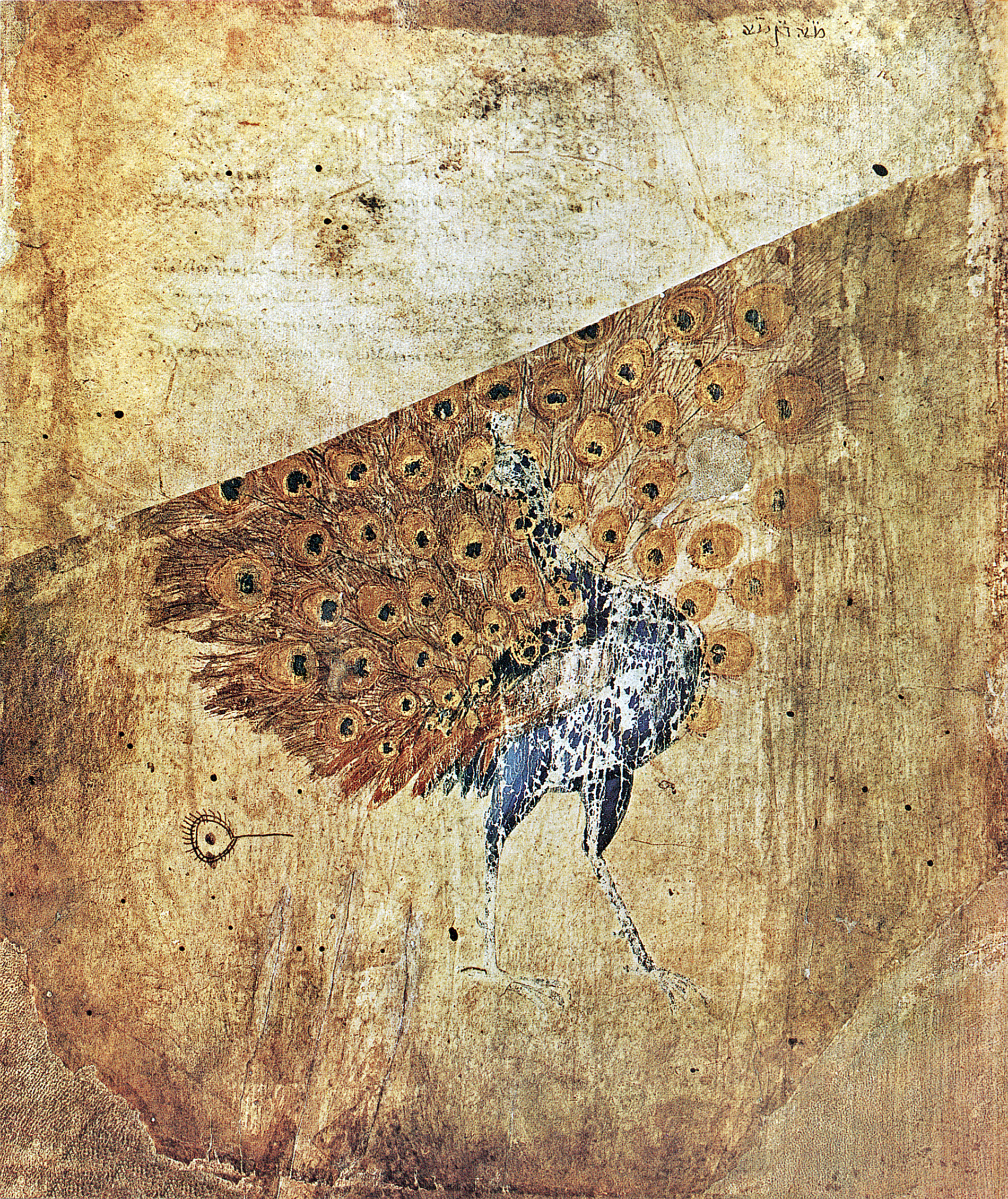
Peacock endpapers

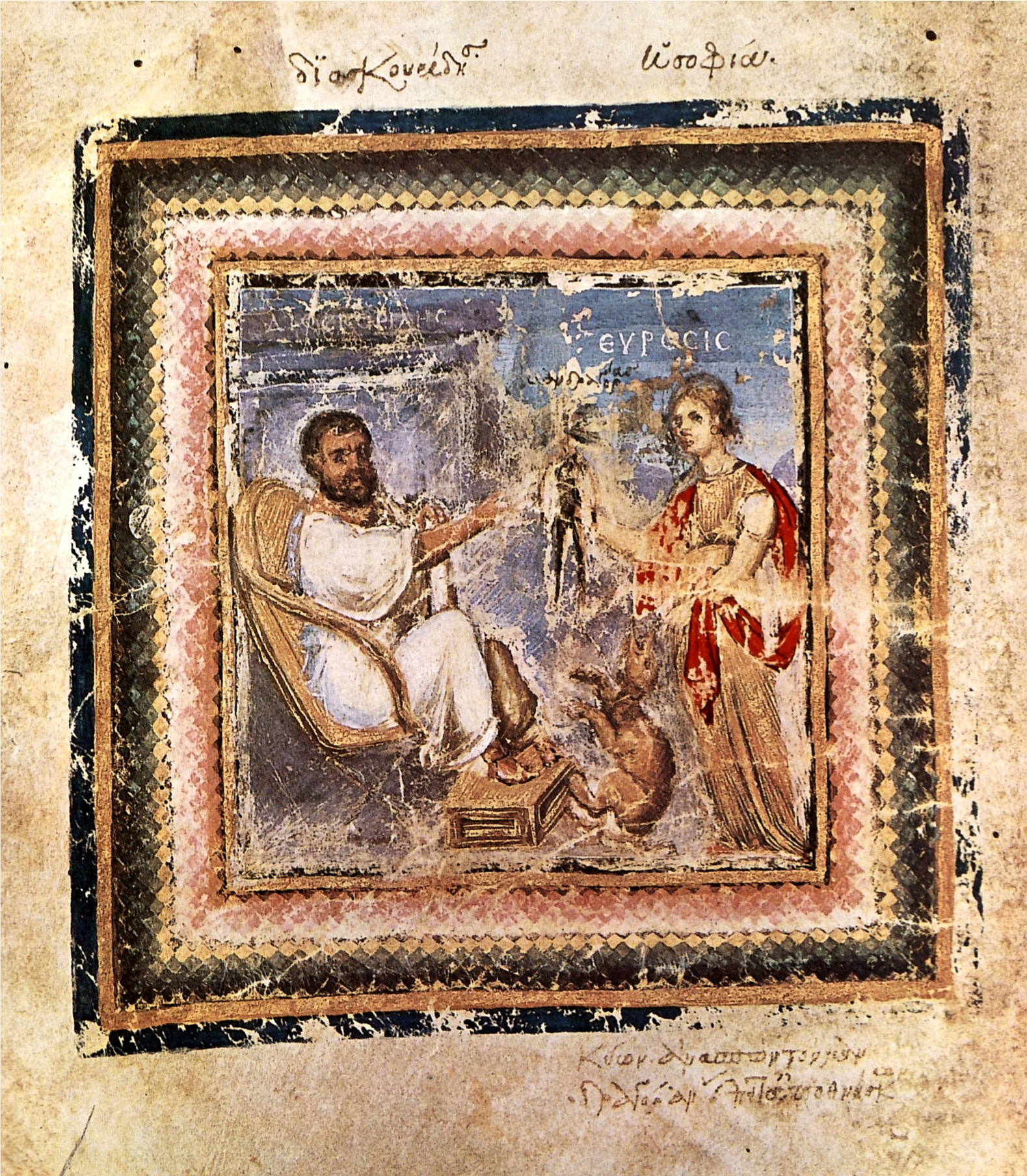
Folio 4v, author portrait

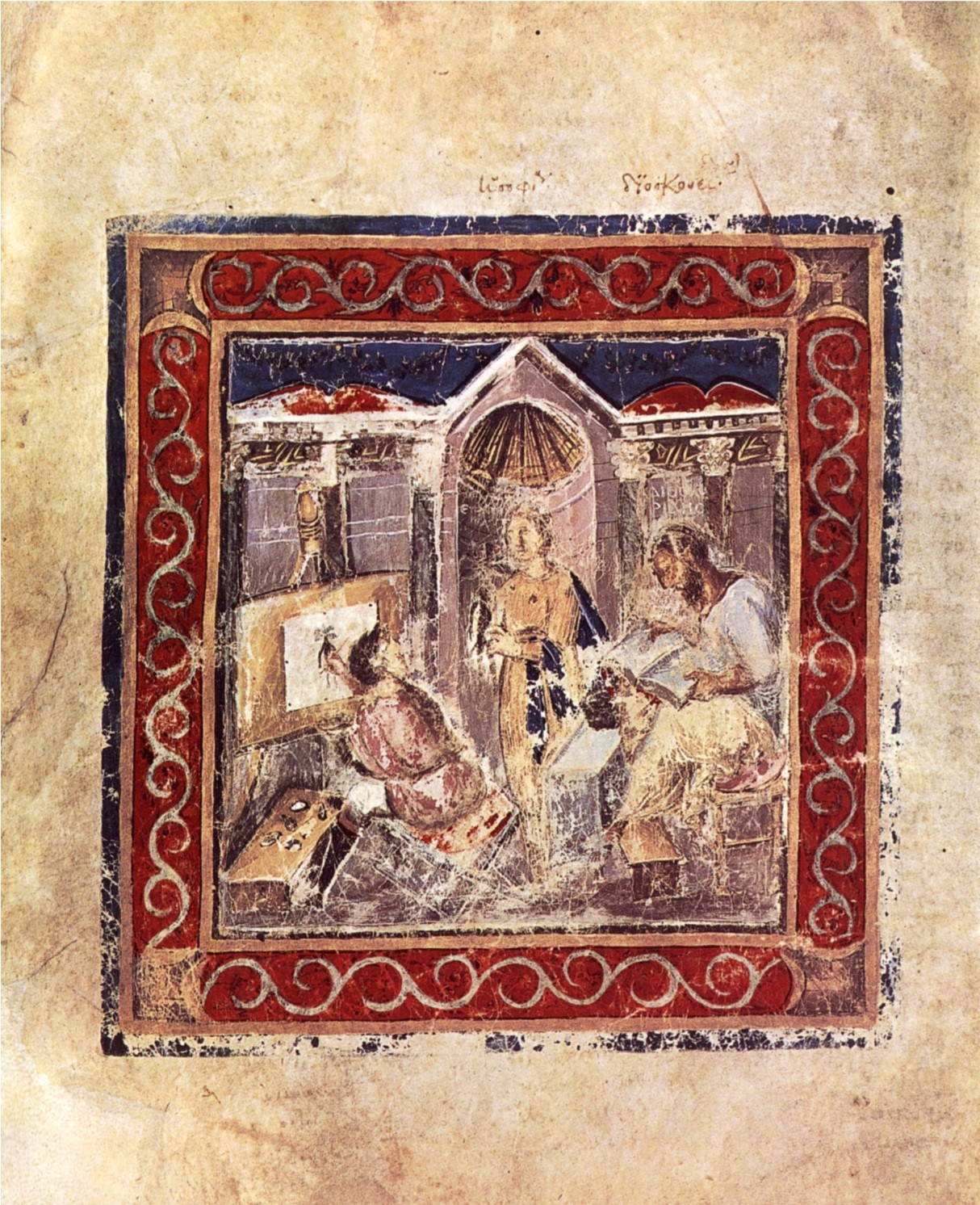
Folio 5v, author portrait

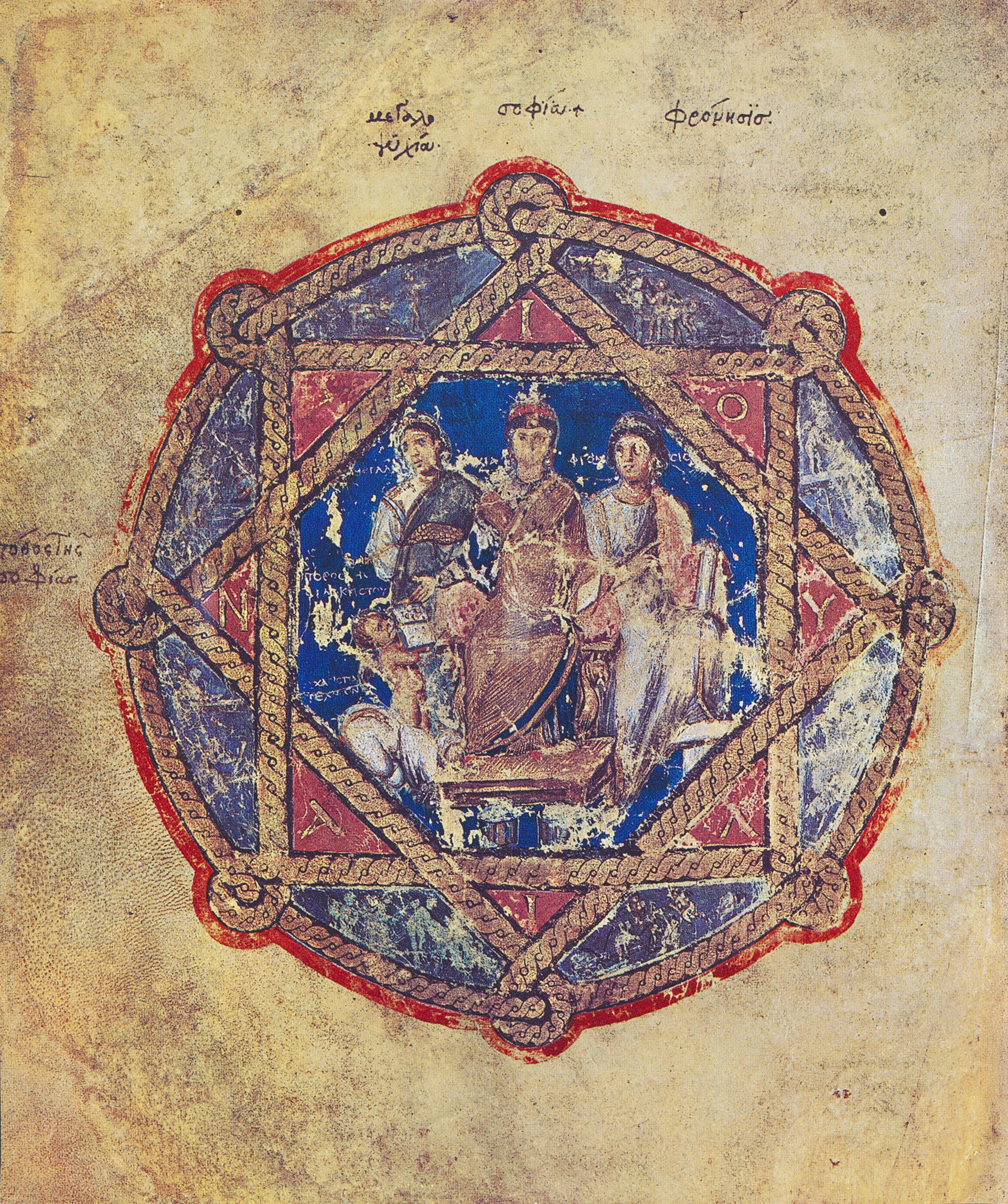
Folio 6v, donation portrait of Anicia Juliana

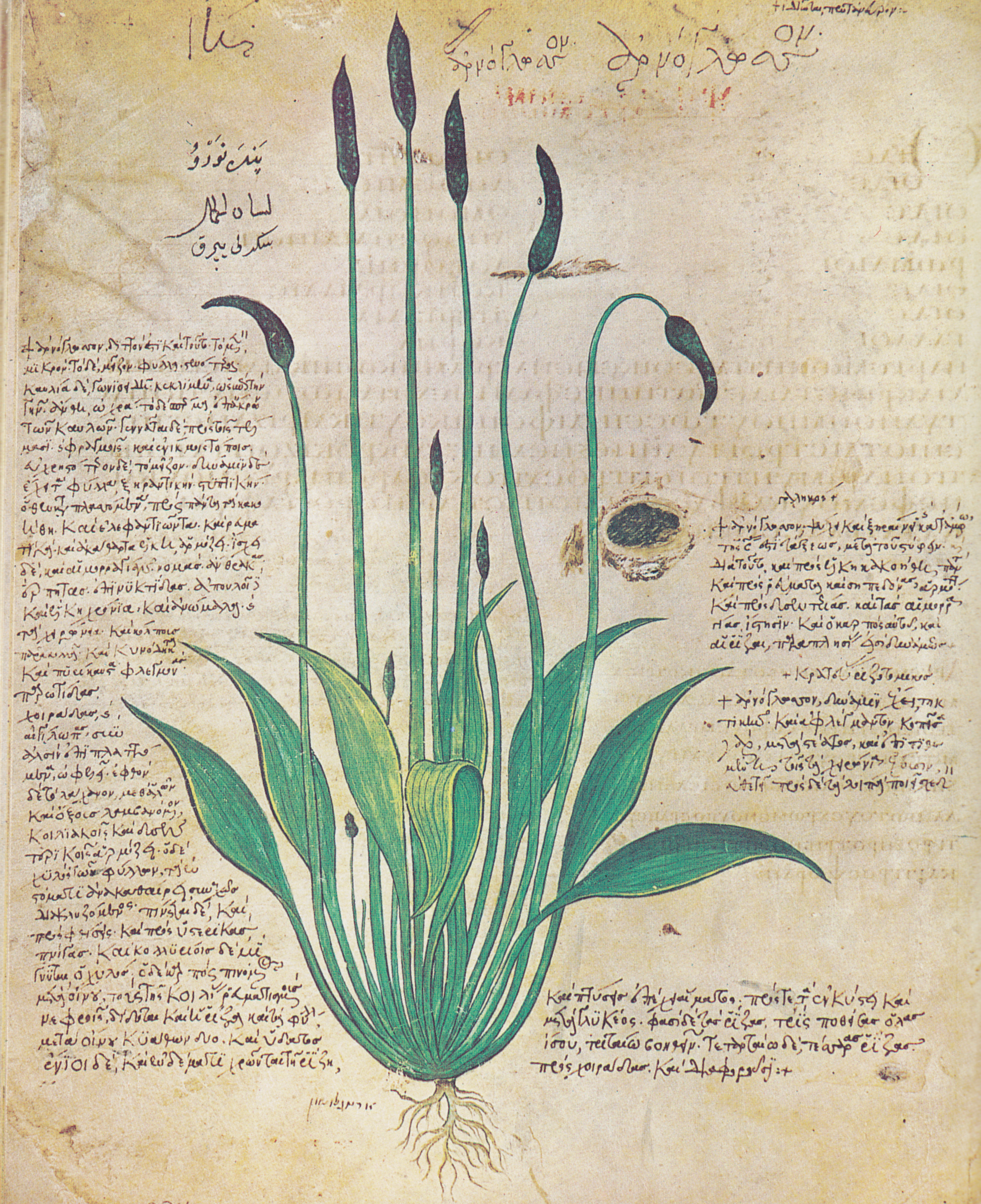
Folio 29v, Plantago lanceolata (lamb's tongue)

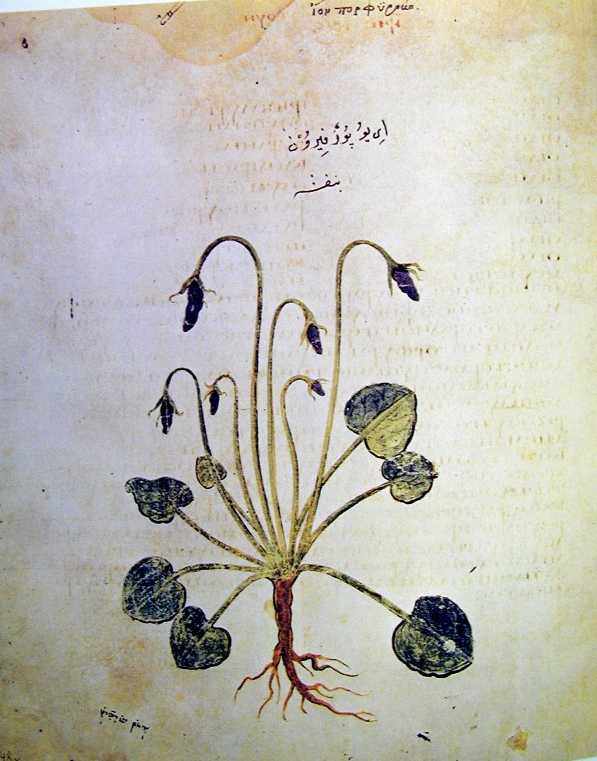
Folio 148v, Viola odorata (violet)

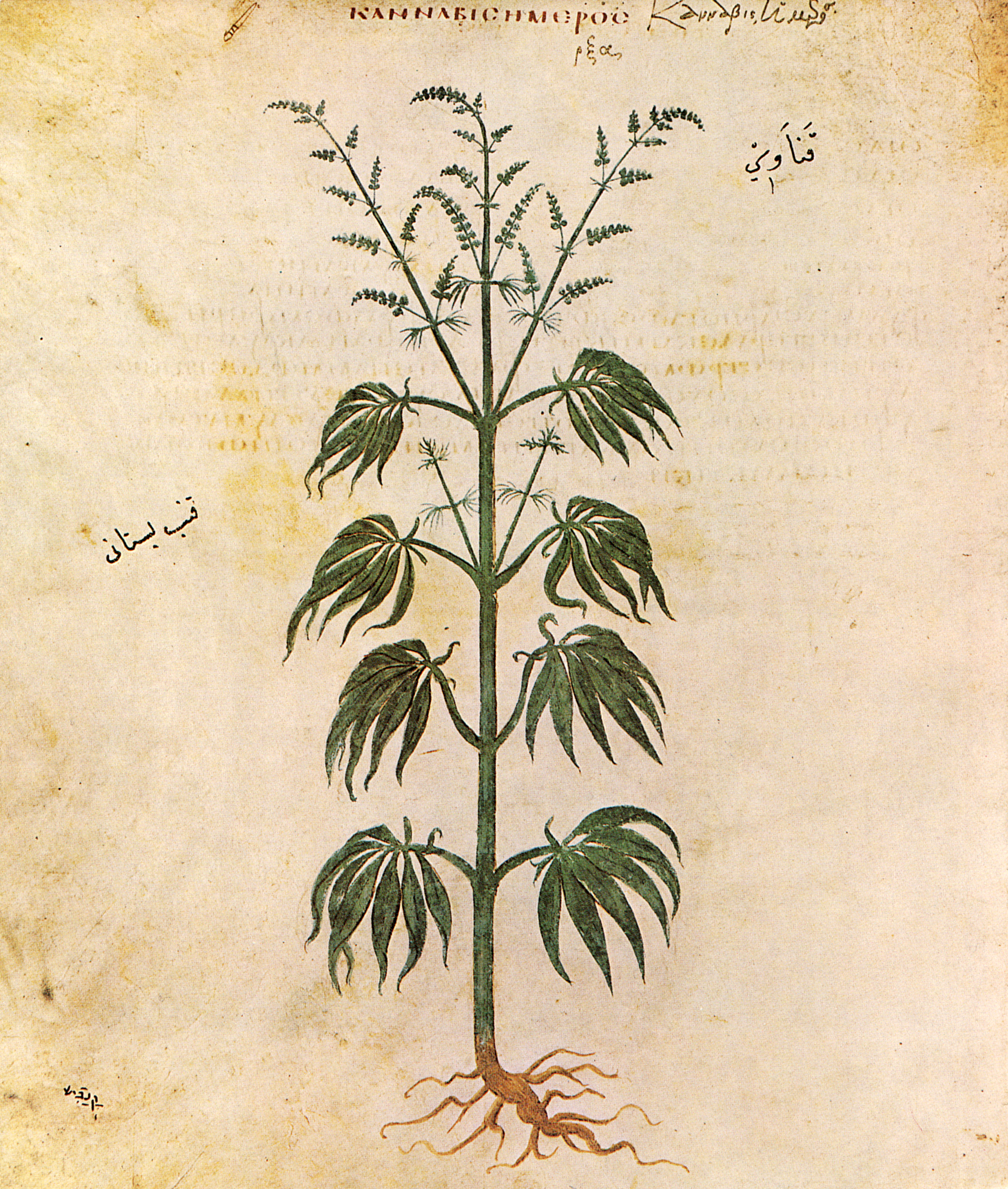
Folio 167v, Cannabis sativa (hemp)

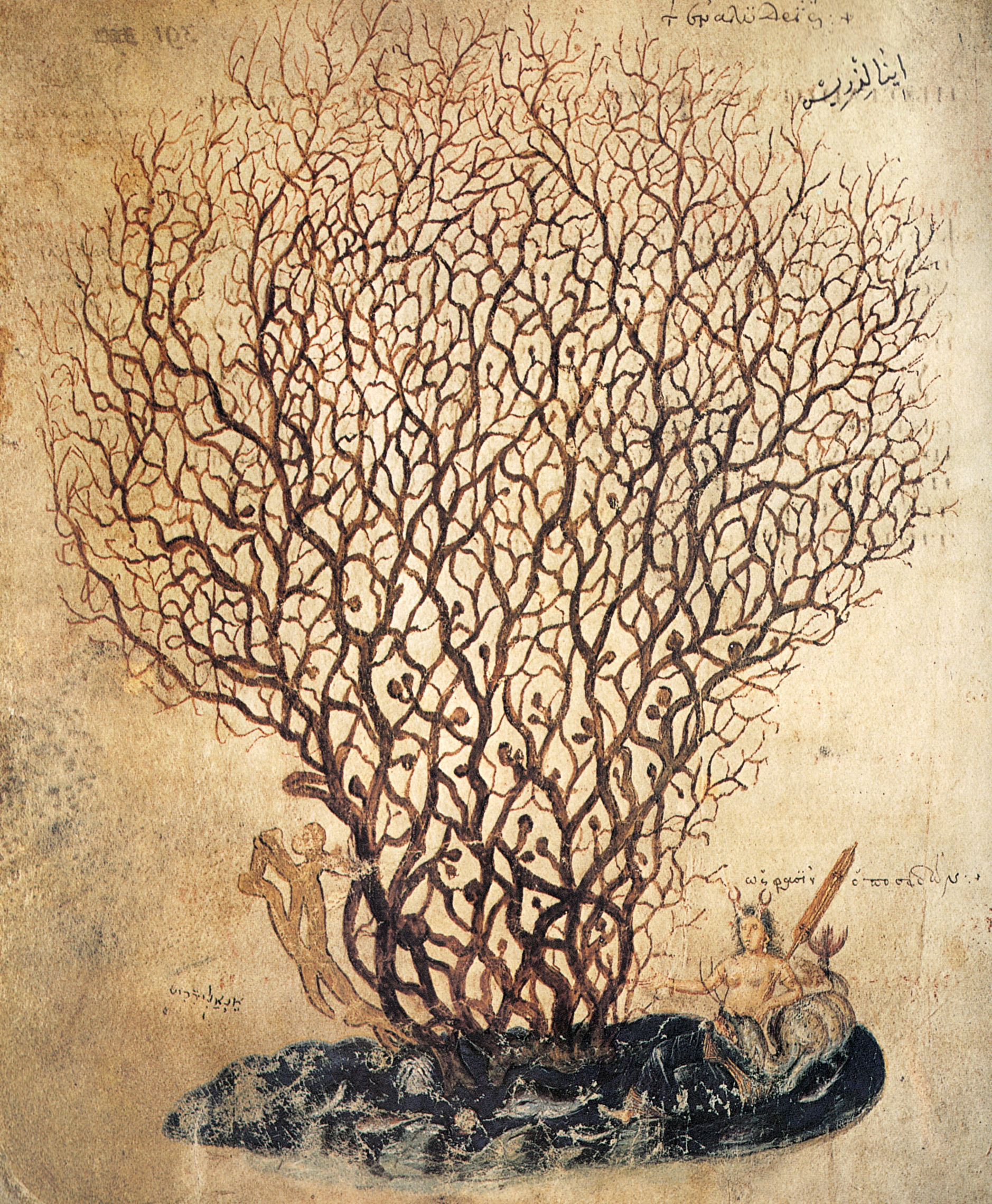
Folio 391v, coral

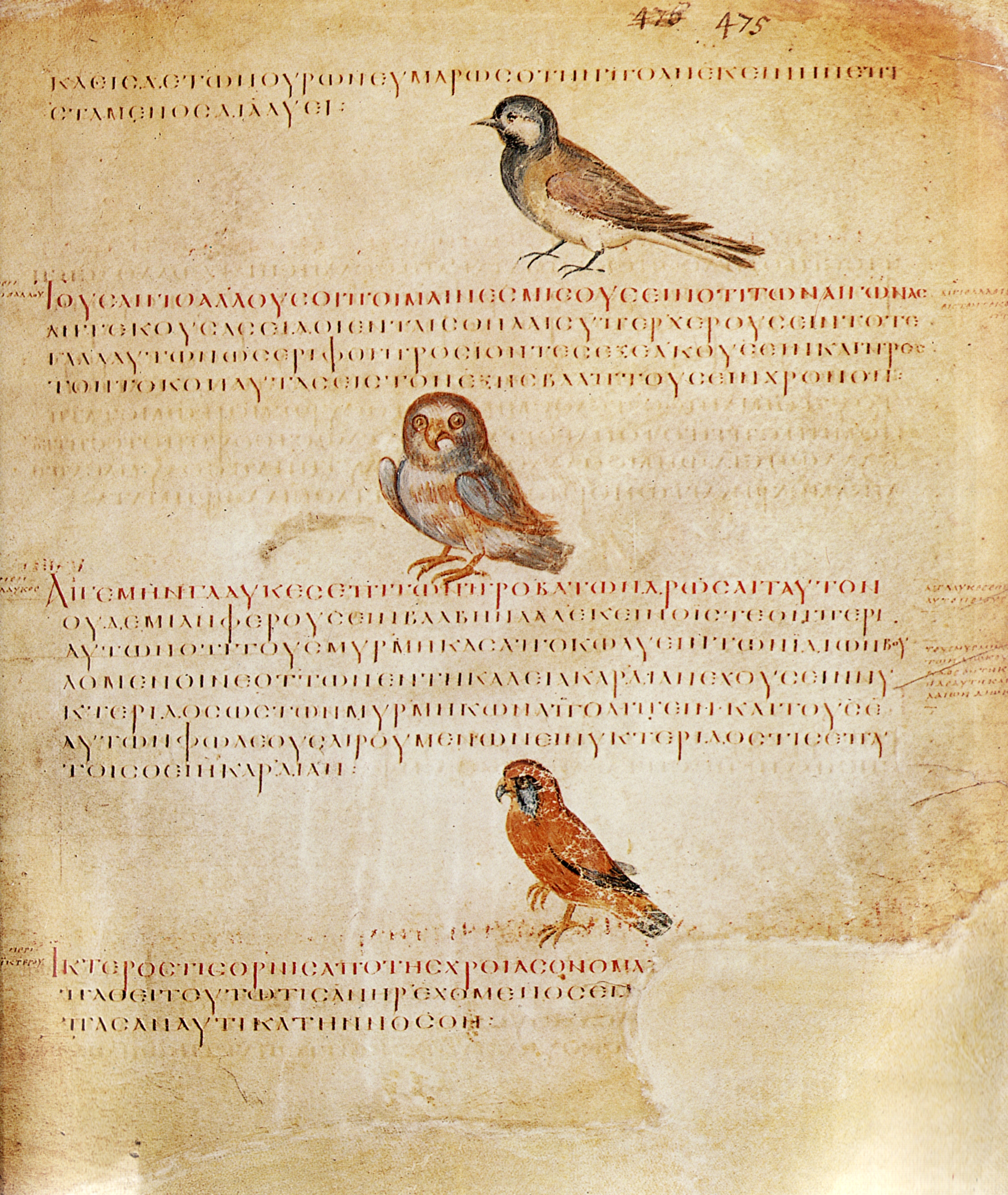
Folio 475r, birds

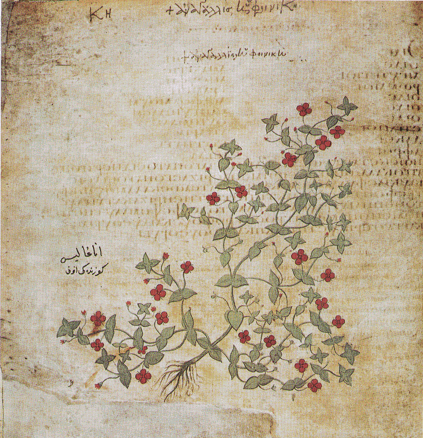
Folio 39v, Anagallis arvensis (scarlet pimpernel)
