= Byzantine illuminated manuscripts =

Illuminated manuscripts produced across the Byzantine Empire

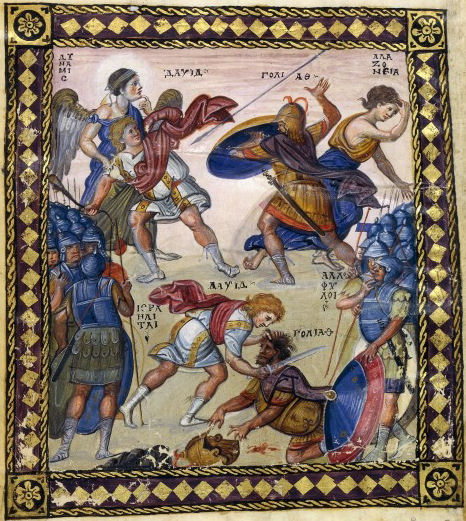
10th-century illumination in the Paris Psalter which depicts the life of King David, traditionally regarded as the author of the Book of Psalms. In total there are 14 images throughout the psalter.

Byzantine illuminated manuscripts were produced across the Byzantine Empire, some in monasteries but others in imperial or commercial workshops. Religious images or icons were made in Byzantine art in many different media: mosaics, paintings, small statues and illuminated manuscripts. Monasteries produced many of the illuminated manuscripts devoted to religious works using the illustrations to highlight specific parts of text, a saints' martyrdom for example, while others were used for devotional purposes similar to icons. These religious manuscripts were most commissioned by patrons and were used for private worship but also gifted to churches to be used in services.

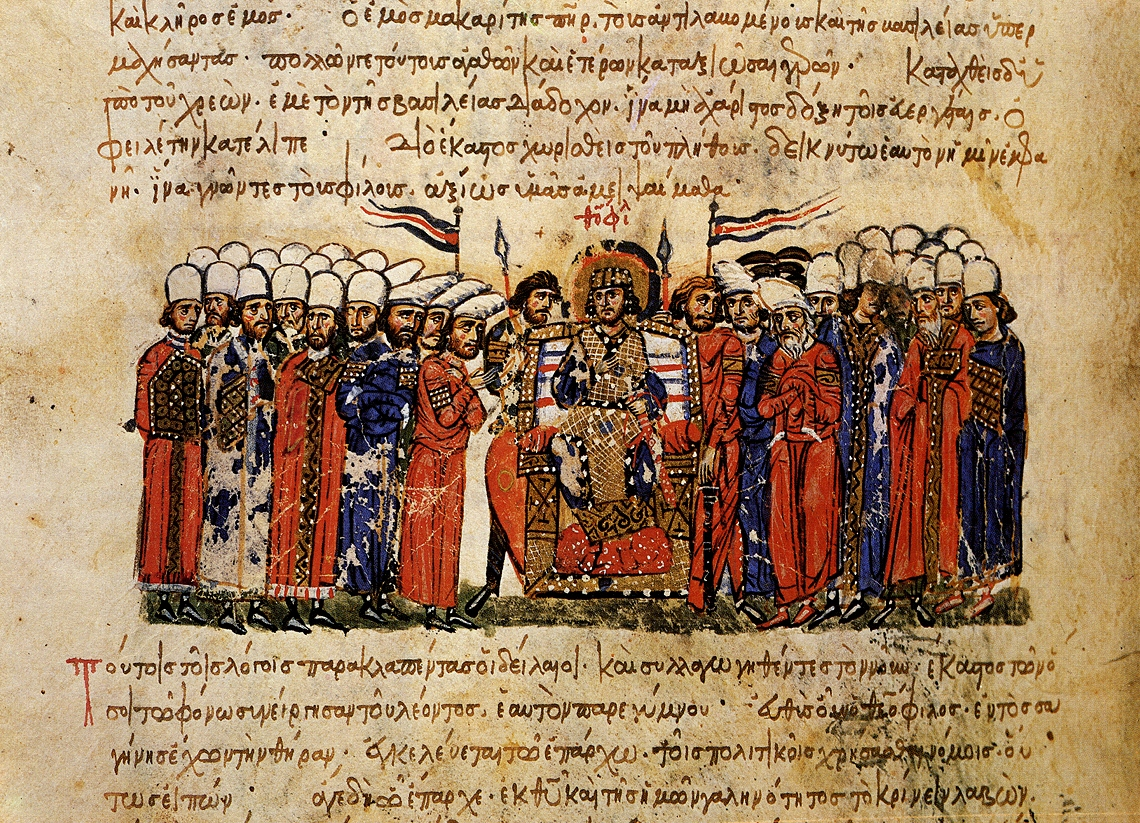
12th century miniature from the Skylitzes Chronicle depicting Emperor Theophilos and his court.

Not all Byzantine illuminated manuscripts were religious texts, secular subjects are represented in chronicles (e.g. Madrid Skylitzes), medical texts such as the Vienna Dioscurides, and some manuscripts of the Greek version of the Alexander Romance. In addition to the majority of manuscripts, in Greek, there are also manuscripts from the Syriac Church, such as the Rabbula Gospels, and Armenian illuminated manuscripts which are heavily influenced by the Byzantine tradition.

"Luxury" heavily-illuminated manuscripts are less of a feature in the Byzantine world than in Western Christianity, perhaps because the Greek elite could always read their texts, which was often not the case with Latin books in the West, and so the style never became common. However, there are examples, both literary (mostly early) and religious (mostly later).

The Byzantine iconoclasm paused production of figural art in illuminated manuscripts for many decades, and resulted in the destruction or mutilation of many existing examples.

Combined there are 40.000 Byzantine manuscripts extant today but most are not illuminated.

== Origins ==
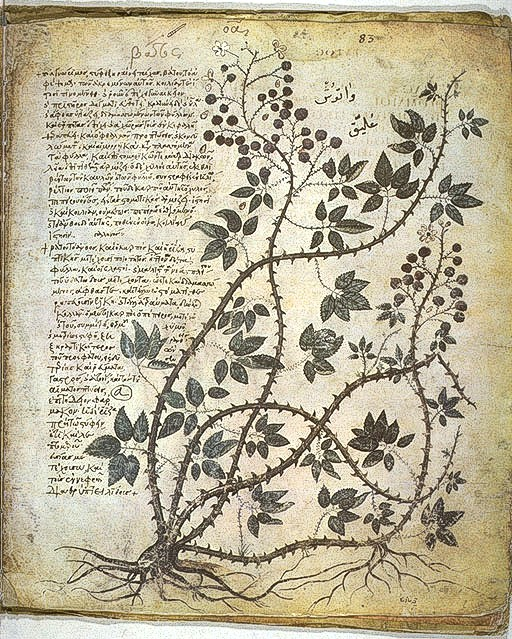
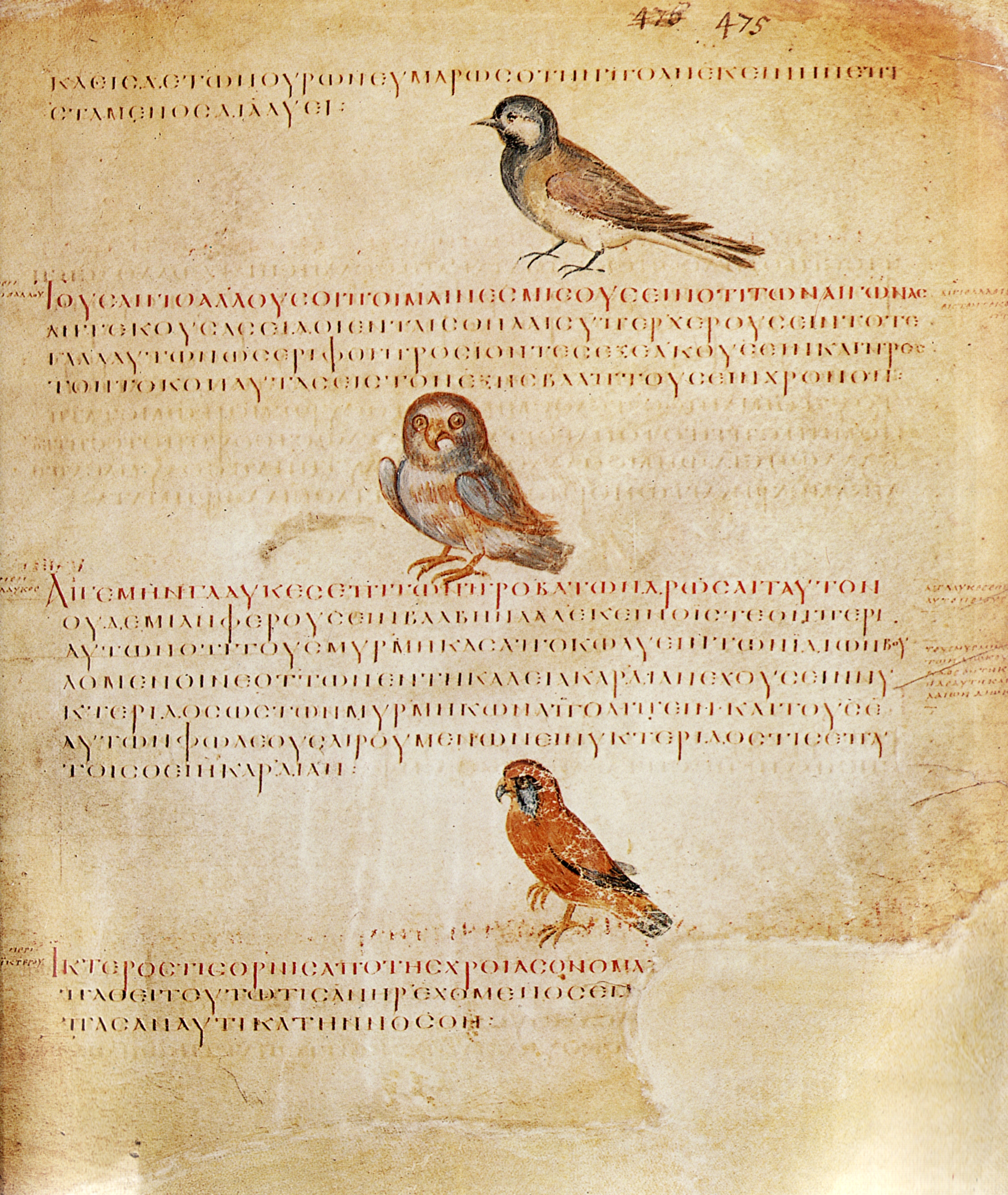
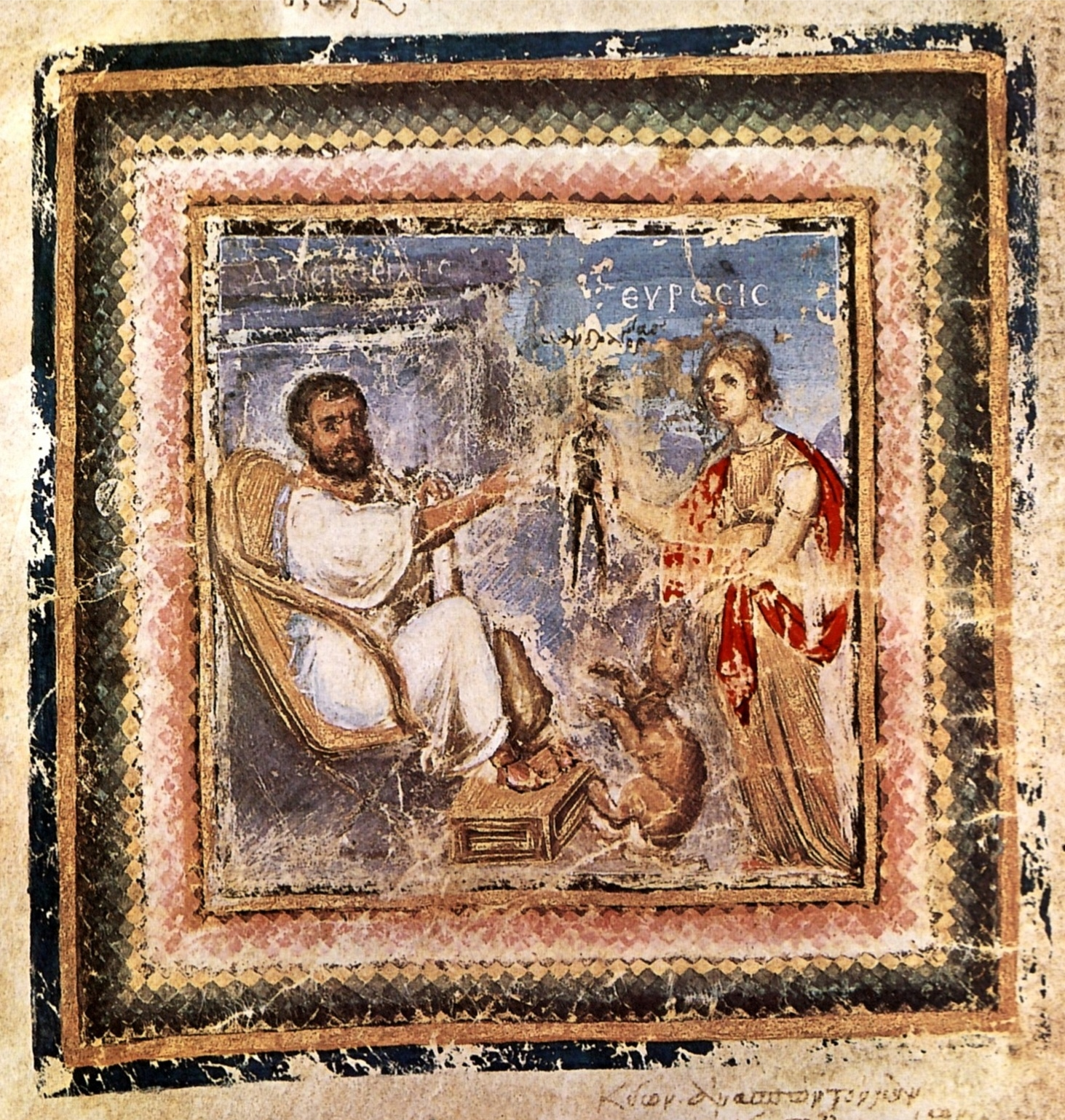
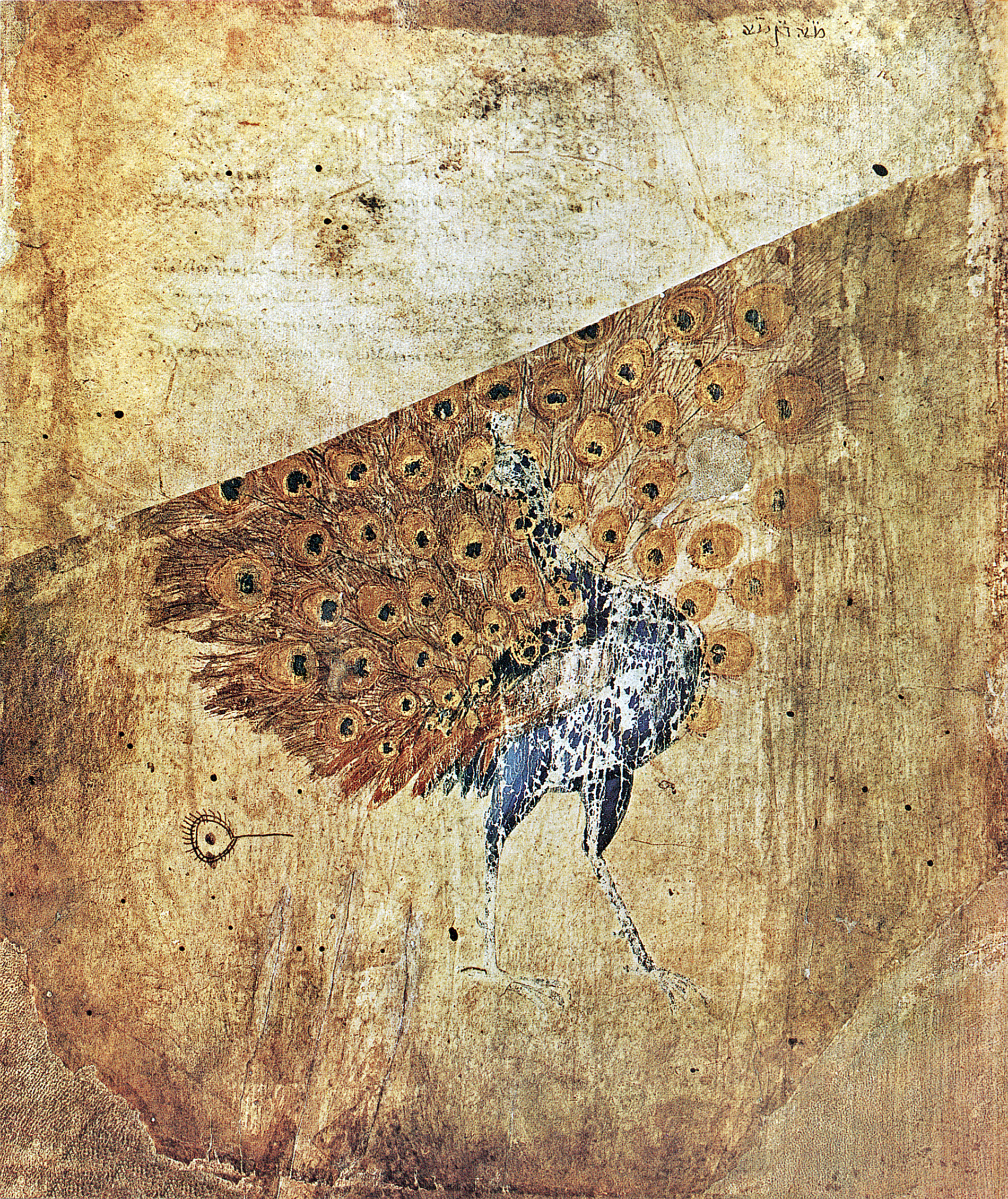
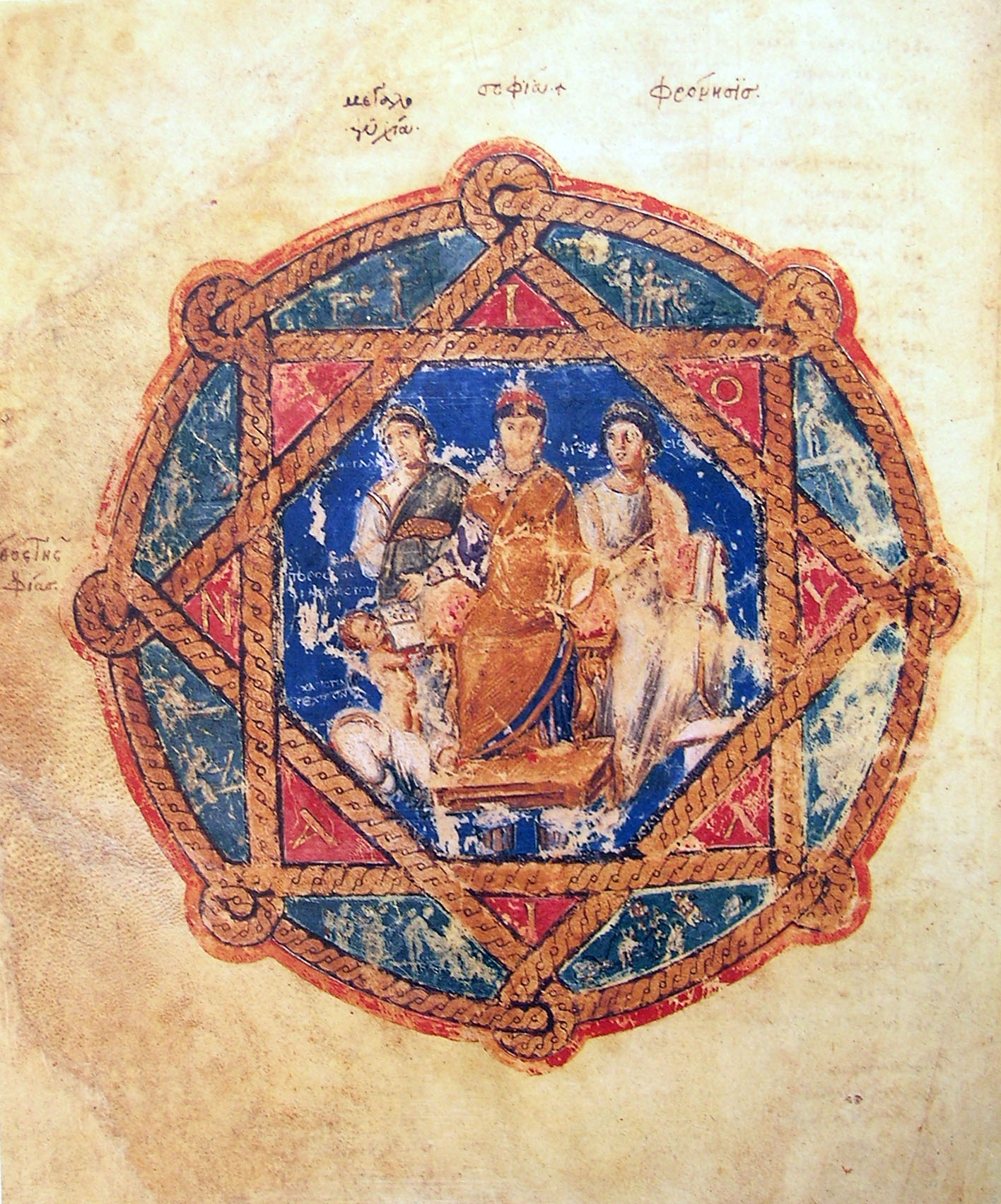
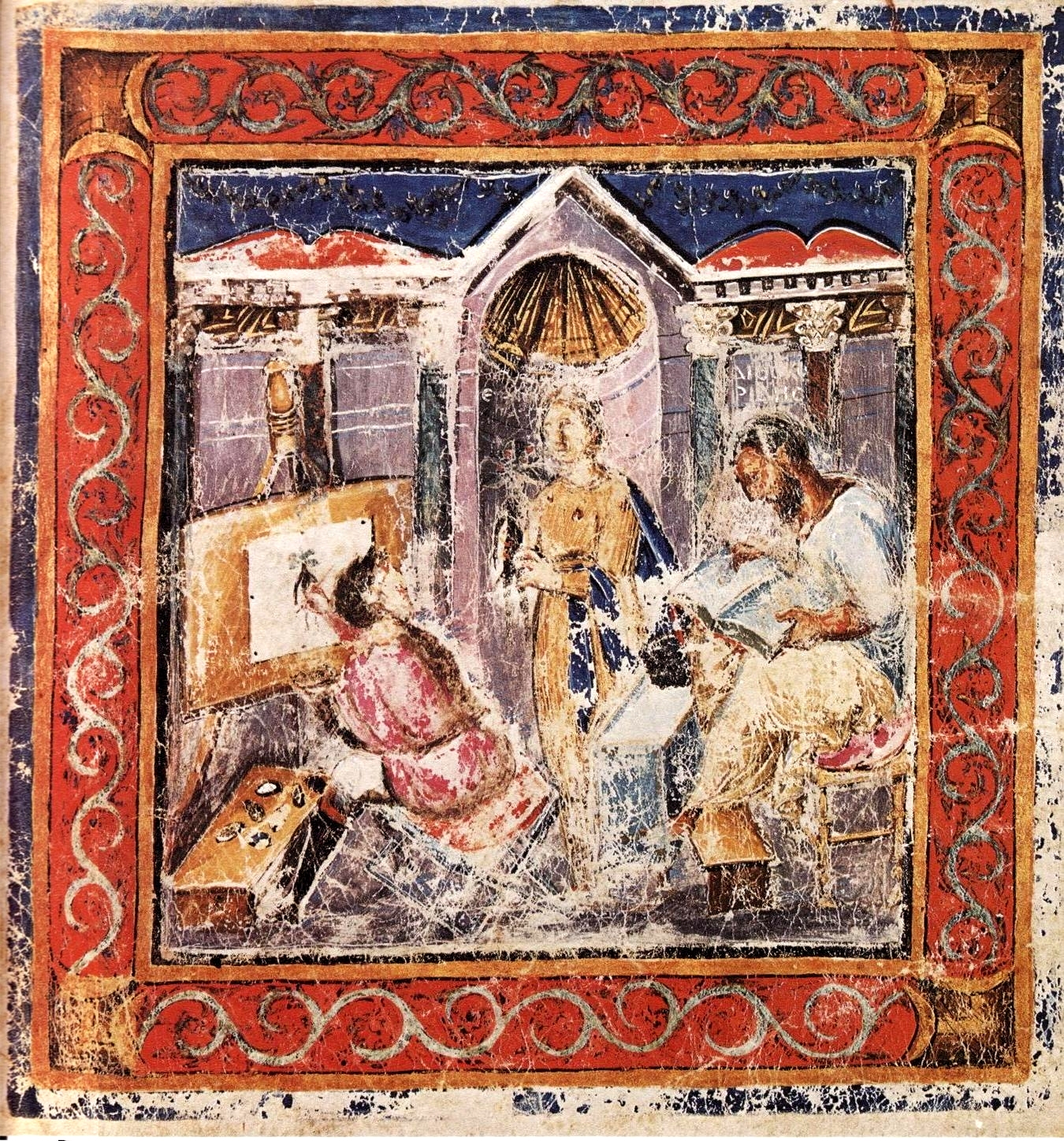
Pages from the Vienna Dioscorides

Due to the lack of early Byzantine manuscripts, it is difficult to know about the situation of illumination during the first centuries of the Eastern Roman Empire. Constantine I installed a scriptorium in his palace, and it is likely that it had a presence of illuminators and miniaturists, but none of its manuscripts have been preserved. There are still some fragments of illuminated papyri found in Egypt which prove that there was an early byzantine tradition of illuminating manuscripts. The earliest manuscripts date back to the 6th century.

These manuscripts show clear influences of ancient stylistic traditions. This is the case in the oldest of these codices, the Vienna Dioscorides, commissioned by Princess Anicia Juliana in Constantinople at the beginning of this century, but also in somewhat later manuscripts such as the Vienna Genesis, the Codex Sinopensis and the Codex Purpureus Rossanensis (which comes from the south of Byzantine Italy) or even the Cotton Genesis, which most likely comes from Egypt. The artistic trend leans more towards hieratic and more abstract figures than in the previous period. The Rabbula Gospels, which come from Mesopotamia and is dated to 586, move further away from this style, with more contrasting colors and more geometric shapes.

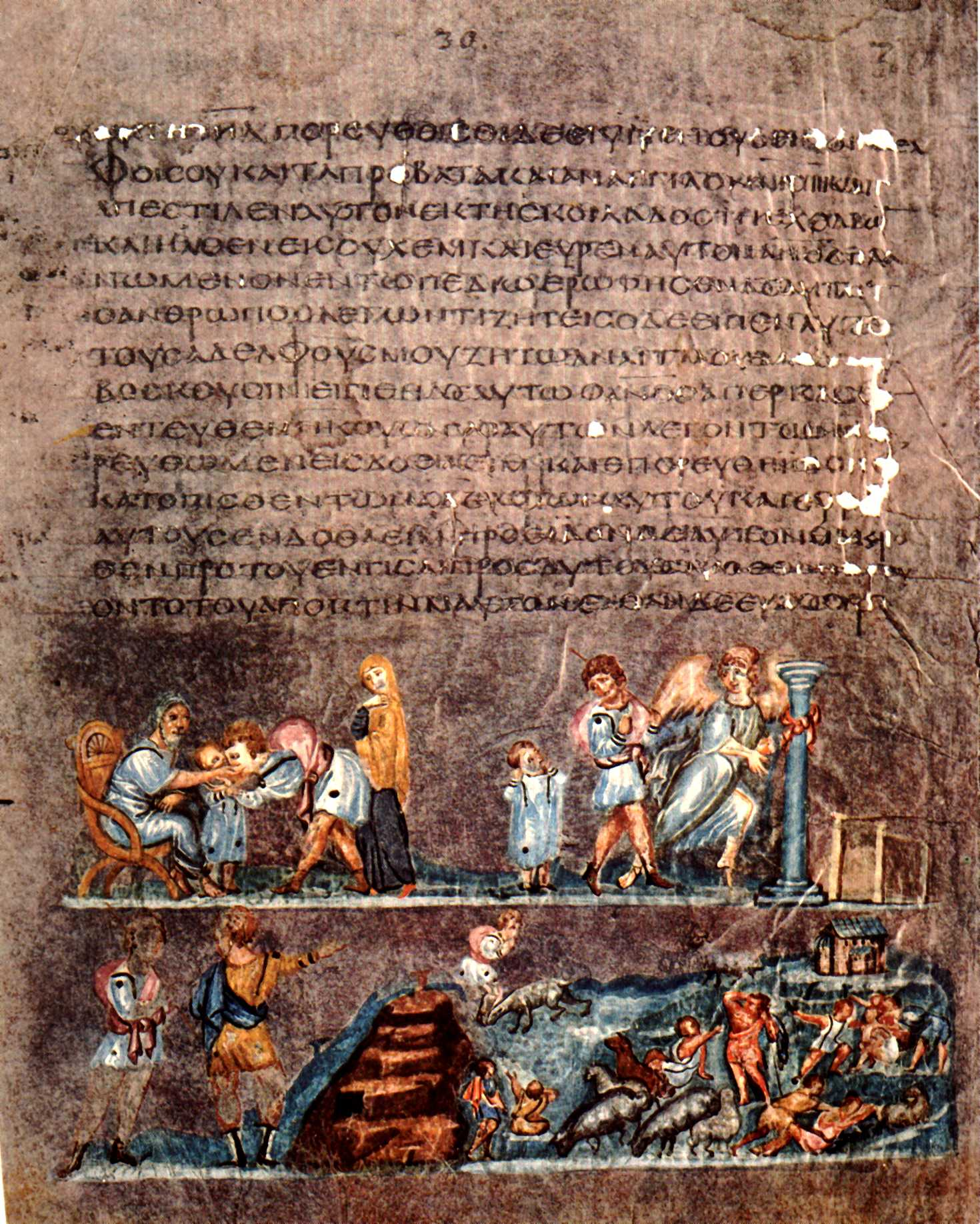
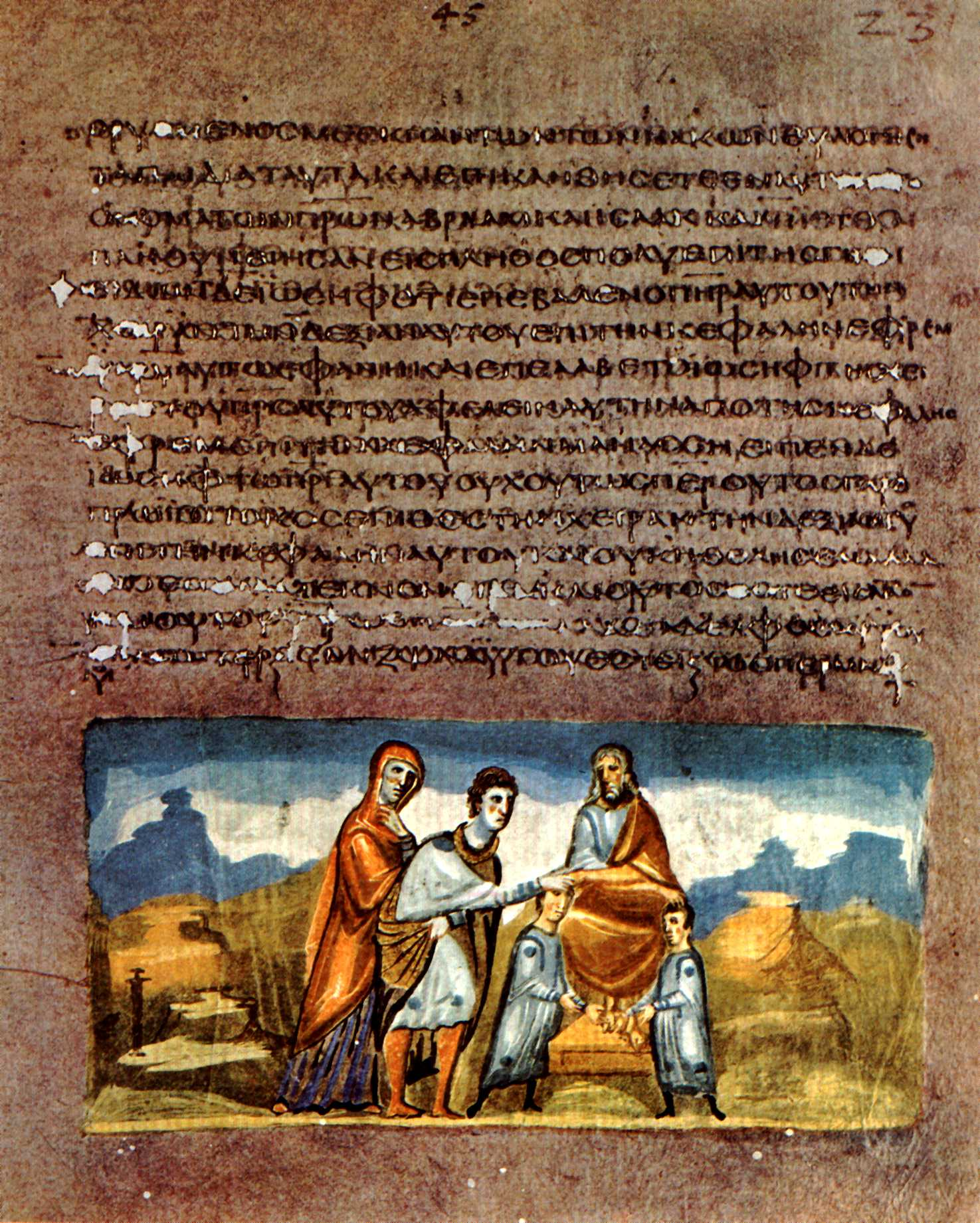
Pages from the Vienna Genesis
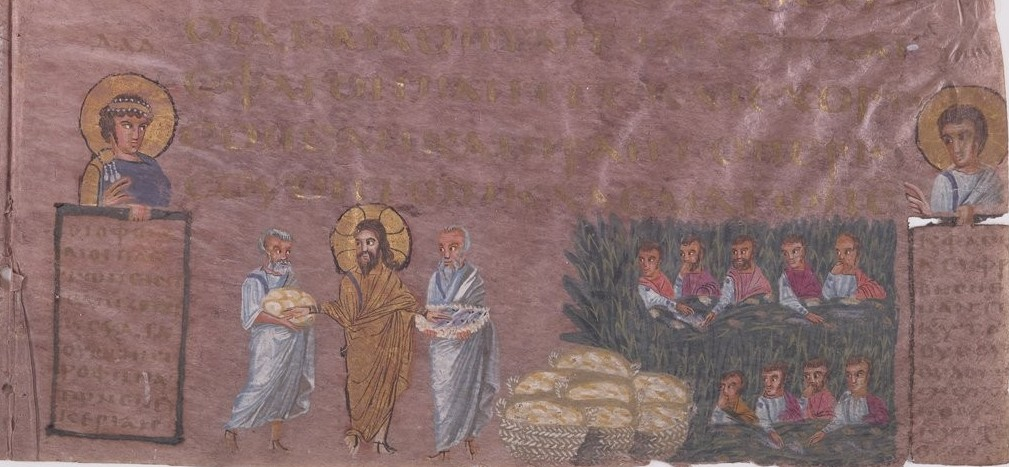
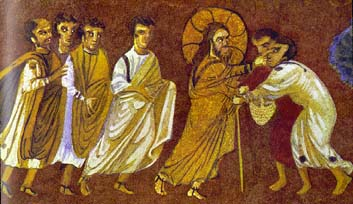
Pages from the Sinopensis Gospel

== Development ==
=== Iconoclastic period ===
While a certain number of works of art and in particular manuscripts were destroyed, some manuscripts were nevertheless produced during this period from the seventh to the mid-ninth century, particularly in the peripheral areas of the empire, such as in Palestine, or in Italy. It is probably in the latter that a copy of the Sacra Parallela (BNF, Greek 923) was produced, which contains more than 1600 illustrations located in the margins of the manuscript. The style is very distant from the models of the late antiquity, it is notable in its use thick black brush strokes and its use of the gold ground technique. But it was in Constantinople, in a monastic scriptorium, that the Chludov Psalter was painted in the middle of the ninth century, it contains numerous figurative decorations in the margins, including a representation of a scene of the destruction of an icon.

=== Renaissance ===
Illumination flourished starting from the late 9th century to the 12th century. Several hundred manuscripts are preserved from this period, they are most often parchment codices, which take precedence over scrolls, although the latter did not completely disappear as shown in the Joshua Roll (Vatican Apostolic Library, Palat.Grec 431). However, they are very often poorly preserved. As the techniques implemented for the coloring recommended either the production of a very thin layer of paint which does not allow them to set correctly on the parchment, or on the contrary the application of a very thick layer which has tendency to flake off. Moreover, it is often difficult to be able to date them and locate their production due to the frequent absence of a colophon.

Illumination from this period most often consists of miniatures either full-page or on part of the page such as margin decorations and less frequently initials of simple ornamental of vegetal or zoomorphic decoration.

The psalters are the most frequent illuminated texts. They are of two types: the monastic psalters, of modest dimensions, whose decorations are found in the margins of almost all pages. This is the case of the Chludov psalter and the Theodore Psalter dated 1066 (BL, Add.19352). The aristocratic psalters are, on the contrary, large in size, and decorated with sumptuous full-page miniatures but in a reduced number, most often depicting biblical royal figures. The Paris Psalter is the most famous example, perhaps made for Constantine VII. Among the other manuscripts, there are octateuchs as well as evangeliaries, which are decorated with portraits of evangelists, scenes from the life of Christ and Eusebian Canons. Many texts of the Church Fathers are also copied and illustrated such as those of John Chrysostom and Gregory of Nazianzus (like the Parisian manuscript Grec 510), as well as menologia. Secular works inherited from antiquity are also copied and decorated, including medical works with Dioscorides again, hunting treatises like that of Oppian of Syria or war treatises. Some chronicles are also illuminated like the chronicle of Skylitzes, now kept in Madrid (National Library of Spain, Graecus Vitr. 26-2).

Among the sources of inspiration, illumination of the late antiquity is still present. However, many manuscripts, including religious ones, also draw their iconography from scenes of daily life. Furthermore, Islamic art provided models for ornamental motifs and zoomorphic decorations.

An evolution stands out during the period. While the first manuscripts of the 10th century, under ancient influence, favored naturalistic or even illusionist representations, from the end of this century, the works presented more hieratic figures, with more elongated dimensions, with a rise of the use of gilded backgrounds. The menologion of Basil II (BAV) as well as his psalter (Biblioteca Marciana, Gr.Z17) represent the beginnings of this style, while the Homilies of Chrysostom (BNF Coislin 79) represents its height in the middle of the eleventh century. The ornamental motifs increased in variations, as can be seen in the Gospel of Paris (BNF Gr.54). During the twelfth century, illuminators associated ornaments and figurative scenes with abundant miniature frames, initials and decorations on the margins. This is the case of the Seraglio Octateuch (Topkapi Palace) and another manuscript of the Gregory of Nazianzuz in Paris (BNF, Gr.550). The apogee of this style is found in the Homilies of James of Kokkinobaphos (BNF, Gr.1208), which also considerably renewed the iconography in use at the time.

=== Latin interlude ===
During the period of the occupation of Constantinople by the Crusaders, between 1204 and 1261, following its sacking, Byzantine art experienced an interval during which it was no longer a priority, the new rulers showing little interest to the art. Only a small group of Byzantine manuscripts are dated to this period, with most of them mixing Latin and Byzantine elements. One of them, a bilingual Latin-Greek gospel book, is still kept at the National Library of France; the Greek-Latin tetra-gospel (Gr.54), which was probably intended for a high Latin dignitary, religious or layman. It was never completed.

=== Palaeologian era ===
The field of illumination remained more in permanence during the time of the Palaiologos than in innovation. The manuscripts of this period take up the models developed in previous periods, drawing inspiration from or even directly imitating the manuscripts of Macedonian or Komnenian art. The works were getting increasingly made on paper and no longer on parchment, the production declined with what remained of the empire. Some works show an influence of Western illumination of the time, such as a Book of Job written by a scribe from Mistra named Manuel Tzykandyles around 1362 (BNF, Gr.132).

Nevertheless, some manuscripts took advantage of the revival of monumental painting during the fourteenth century, with much more expressive and virtuoso representations, particularly in portraits. These are found in a manuscript of theological works of Emperor John VI Kantakouzenos (BNF, Gr.1242) in which are painted in addition to a Transfiguration, the portraits of the owner as an emperor and as a monk. This is also the case with a manuscript from of Hippocrates depicting the Grand Duke Alexios Apokaukos (BNF, Gr.2144) and another from the Bodleian library (Typicon, Cod.Gr.35) depicting nuns around their abbess of Monastery of the Good Hope in Constantinople.

== Subject Matter ==
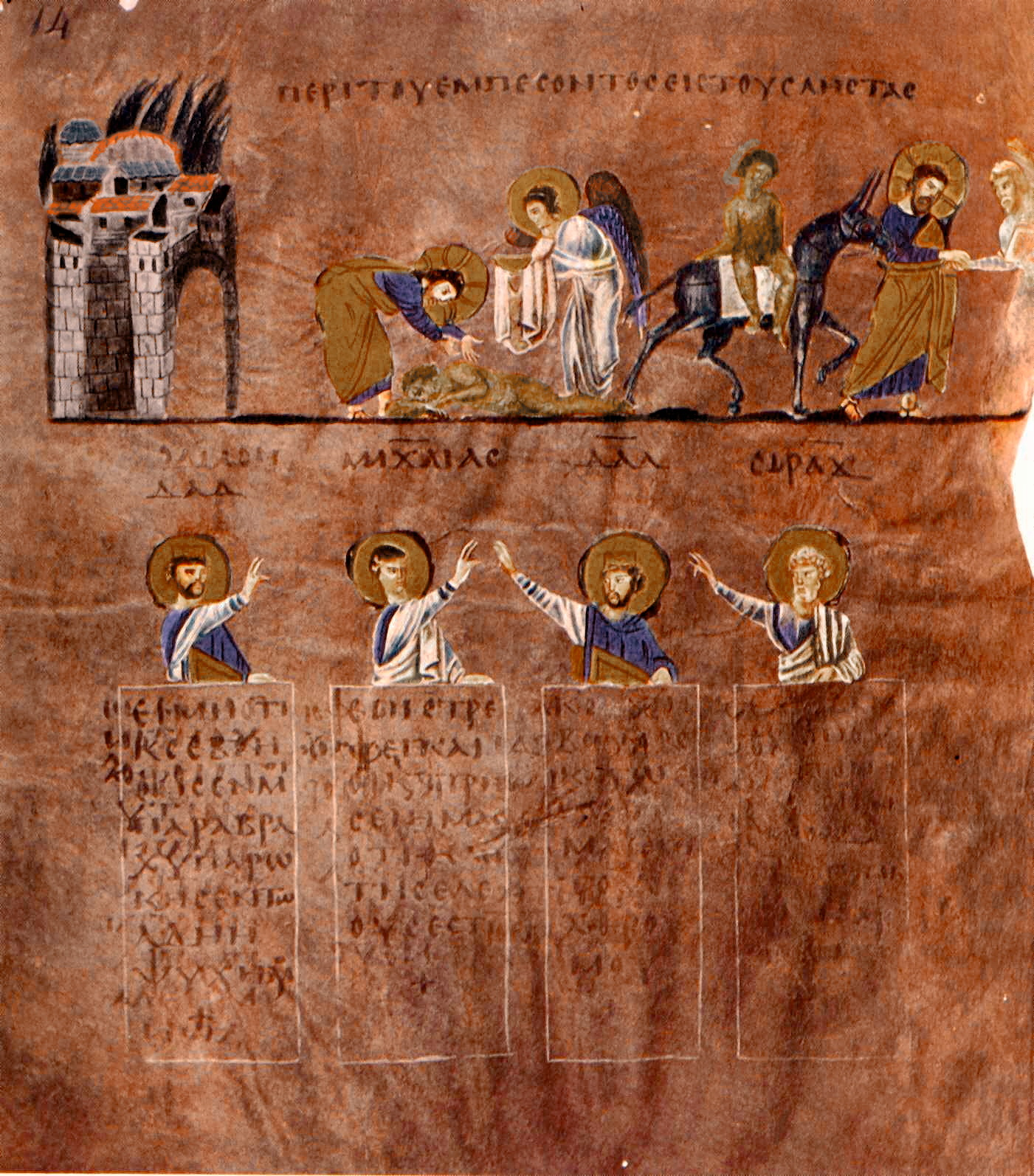
6th century page from the Rossano Gospels. The oldest surviving illuminated New Testament manuscript.

=== Devotional Manuscripts ===
The Greek Bible was produced in small segments during the Byzantine period for private study and use during church services. For example there are 15 known illuminated manuscripts of Book of Job, with some 1,500 illustrations between them. As in the West, the gospel book and psalter were the most common extracted texts, with two famous Late Antique versions of the Book of Genesis (Vienna Genesis and Cotton Genesis). Early Old Testament manuscripts, and for example the Joshua Roll, are speculated to draw on a Jewish tradition in the Hellenistic world, of which no examples survive.

The Old (Septuagint) and New Testaments were separated into the Octateuch, also known as the eight books from Genesis to Ruth, the psalter and the Four Gospels. Manuscripts specifically created for Mass (liturgy) included the sacramentary, the gradual and the missal. The pages were ornately decorated with gold paint and reddish-purple backgrounds.

==== Prophet or Gospel Books ====
One of the earliest known illuminated New Testament manuscripts is the 6th-century Rossano Gospels. The Illuminated Prophet Books are another example of illuminated manuscripts depicting major and minor prophets through portraiture along with narrative miniatures. The style of illustrations follow somewhat of an icon model but a title noting the name of the prophet was needed to prevent confusion. None of the prophet books contain a date but based on the style of the miniatures and script they approximately range from the mid tenth century to the mid thirteenth century.

==== The Chronicle of John Skylitzes of Madrid ====
In the twelfth century, The Chronicle of John Skylitzes of Madrid documented Byzantine history from the ninth to eleventh century with over 600 illustrated scenes placed throughout the text. The illustrations are placed on each page many of the compositions repeating themselves. In order to create many images, illuminators made a model to copy instead of crafting new narrative compositions each time. The repeated images show the possible use of models with the artist changing the paint colors in order to represent another group of people or scene taking place. The integration of text and image was important within this manuscript in order to illustrate the Byzantine history effectively by highlighting key events.

=== Author portraits ===
The classical tradition of the author portrait at the start of many literary manuscripts was continued in the Byzantine period, with the evangelist portrait at the start of one of the four Gospels the most common examples, but other authors such as Dioscurides also receiving them.

== Patronage ==
During the Byzantine Empire, religious art was produced with the help of patrons who provided the funds needed to produce these works. Some of the Byzantine illuminated manuscripts were created at the request of patrons and were used for both for private viewing and church services. Requesting the illuminating lectionary, Gospel Books, was a way for patrons to show their devotion to Christianity and religious institutions. Dionsyiou cod. 587 is an example of an illuminated Gospel made for the patriarch of Constantinople to read during mass. The illustrations were created to enhance the passages of the Gospel and bring the word of God to the viewer. The four Gospels, John, Mathew, Luke and Mark take the reader through the year from Easter to Easter. This manuscript also made use of models depicting similar figures with minor alterations or color variations. The models were not always accurate since the artists had to create these images from memory of past texts allowing for some altering of iconography.

== Significant manuscripts (with articles) ==
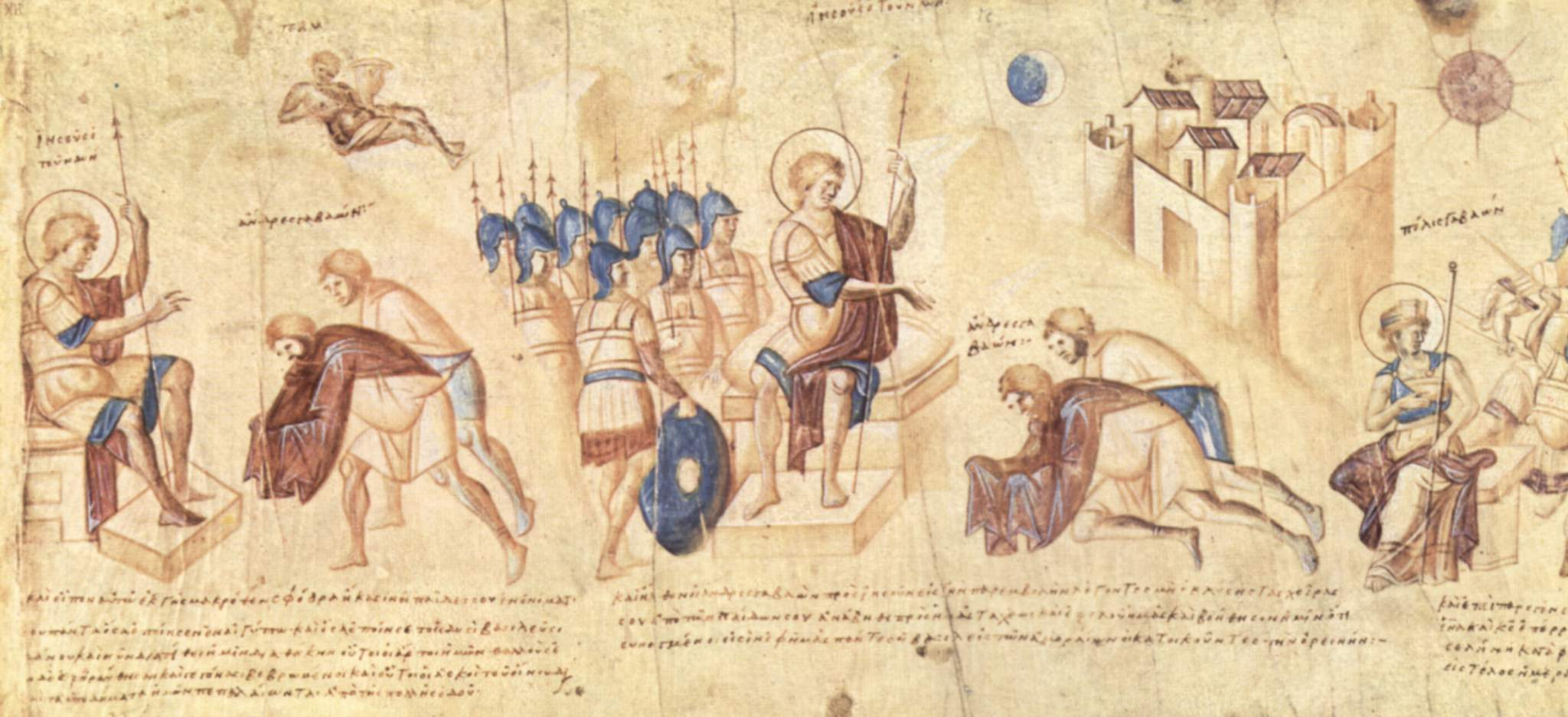
Portion of the Joshua Roll, a 10th century scroll; scenes before the battle at Gibeon – the moon and sun are seen at the right.

- Cotton Genesis, 4th or 5th century, heavily illustrated. Images copied before the original was mostly destroyed in the Cotton library fire in 1731, leaving only eighteen charred fragments.
- Ambrosian Iliad, 52 small images cut out in the Middle Ages from a 5th-century manuscript
- Old Testament fragment (Naples, Biblioteca Vittorio Emanuele III, I B 18), 5th-century Coptic fragment
- Rabbula Gospels, 6th-century Syriac gospel book
- Alexandrian World Chronicle, probably 6th-century fragmentary world history
- London Canon Tables, 6th-7th century fragment of a grand gospel book.
- Syriac Bible of Paris, 6th-7th century, much missing
- Vienna Dioscurides, early 6th-century medical text
- Naples Dioscurides, 7th century
- Paris Gregory, c. 880, a gift for the emperor
- Sacra Parallela, a 9th-century manuscript in Paris has 1,658 illustrations
- Chludov Psalter, 9th century, many small illustrations, some related to the controversy over Byzantine iconoclasm
- Paris Psalter, 10th-century luxury psalter with 14 full-page miniatures
- Joshua Roll, 10th century scroll with large illustrations of the story of Joshua
- Menologion of Basil II, c. 1000, 430 mostly half-page pictures
- Madrid Skylitzes, 12th century chronicle with 574 small miniatures, produced in Sicily, probably copying an older version

== Gallery ==
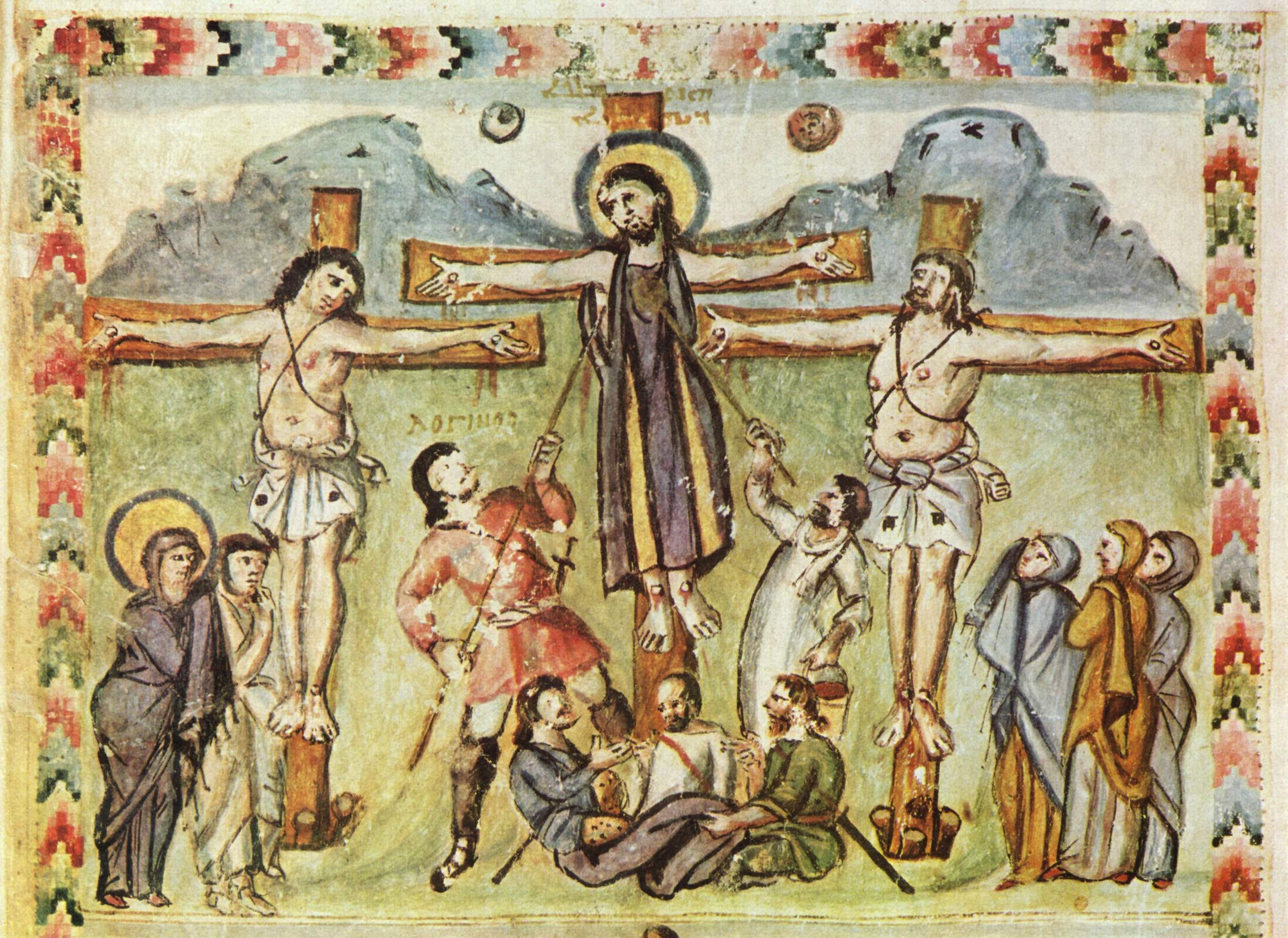
The earliest crucifixion in an illuminated manuscript, from the 6th-century Syriac Rabbula Gospels

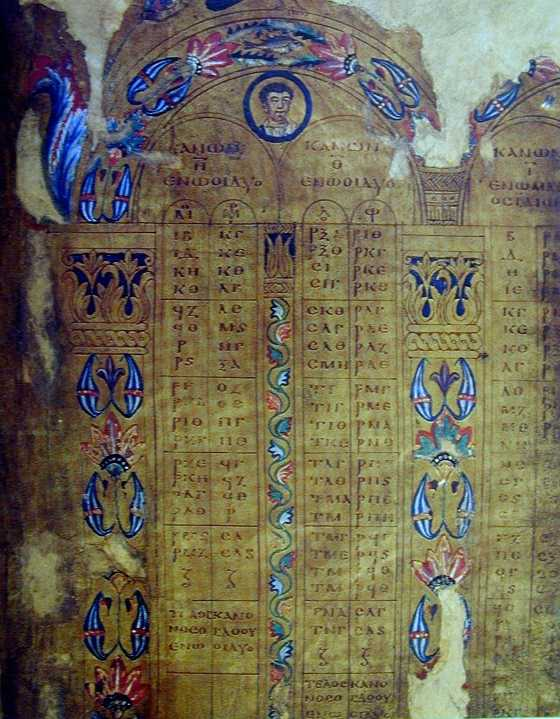
6th-7th century London Canon Tables which were bound with a 12th-century Byzantine Gospel Book.

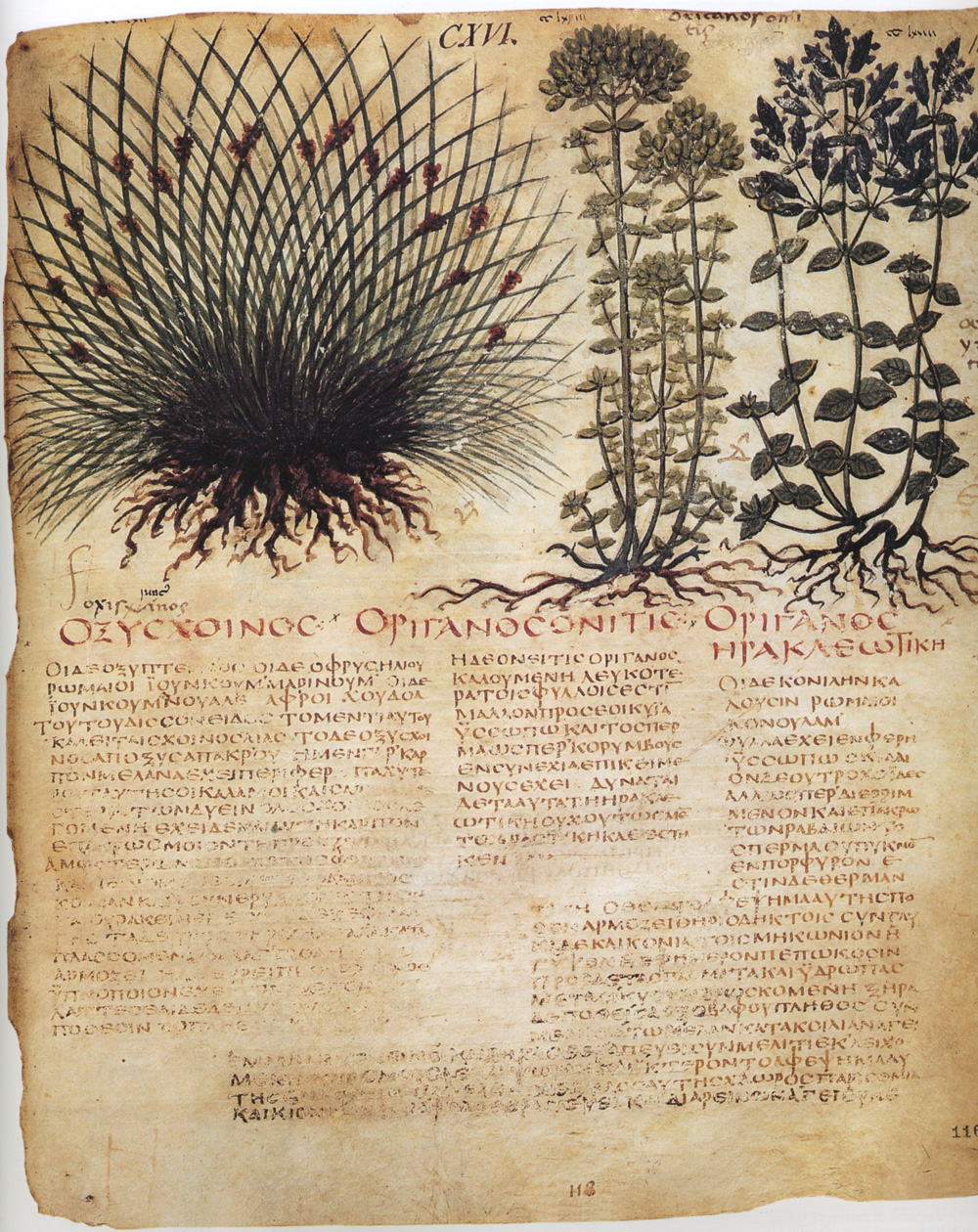
Naples Dioscurides, 7th-century manuscript illustrating plants and their medicinal use.

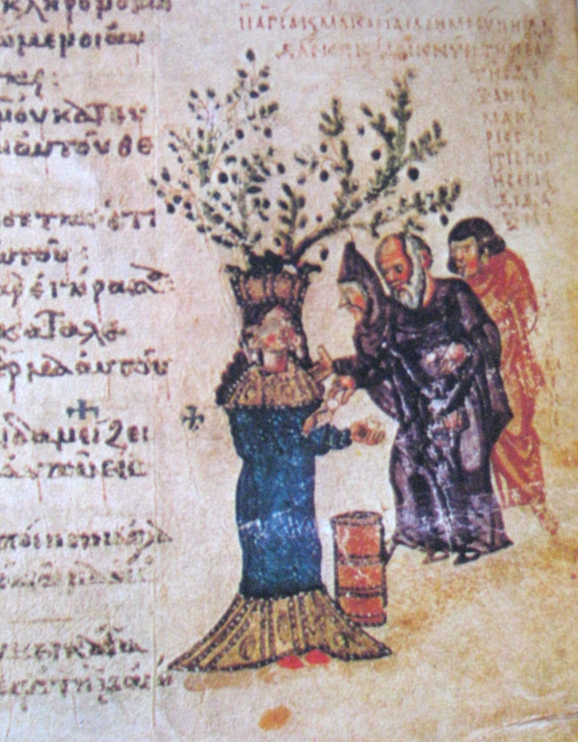
9th-century page from the Chludov Psalter, a volume containing the Book of Psalms.

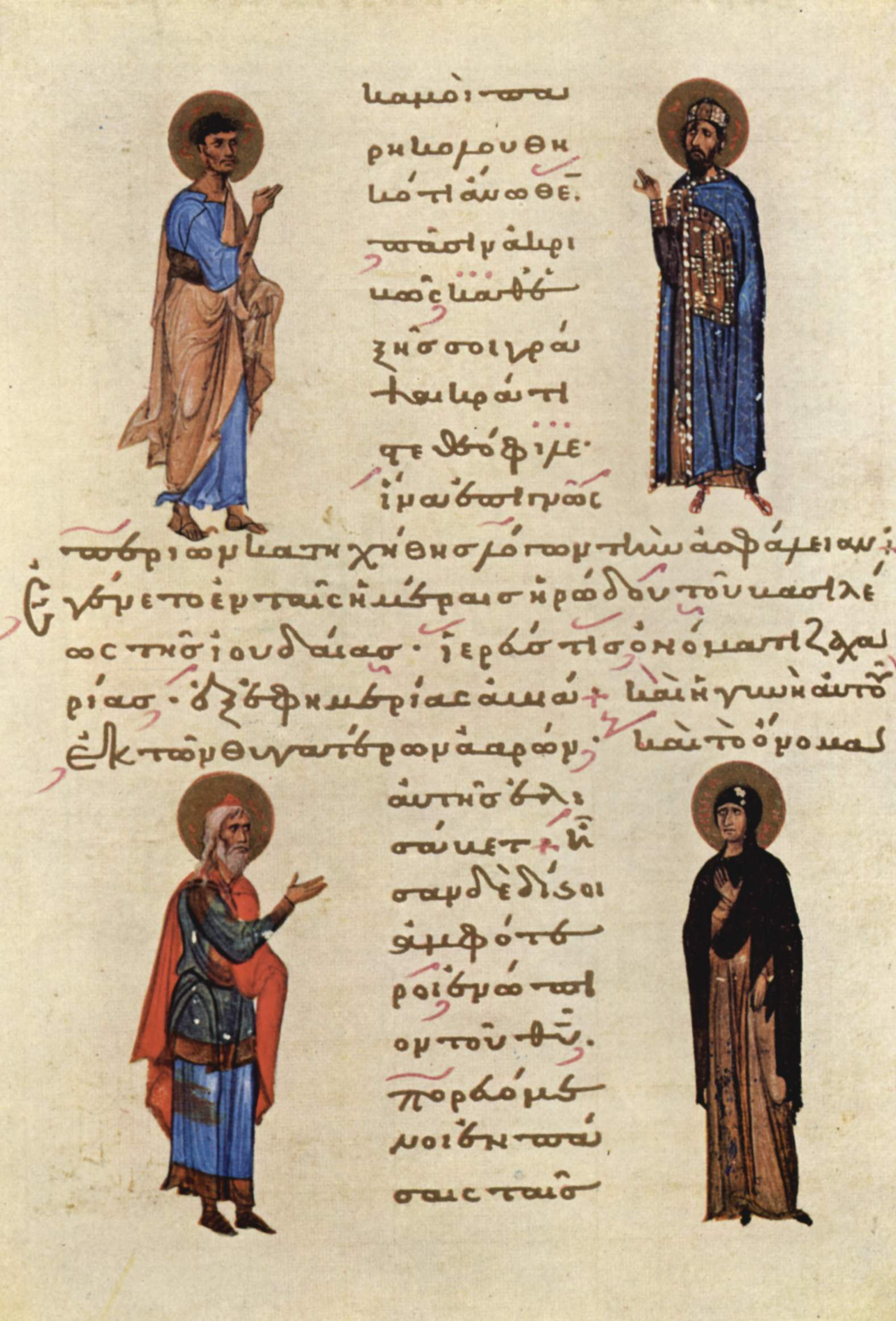
11th century the writings from the beginning of the Gospel of Luke with illumination.

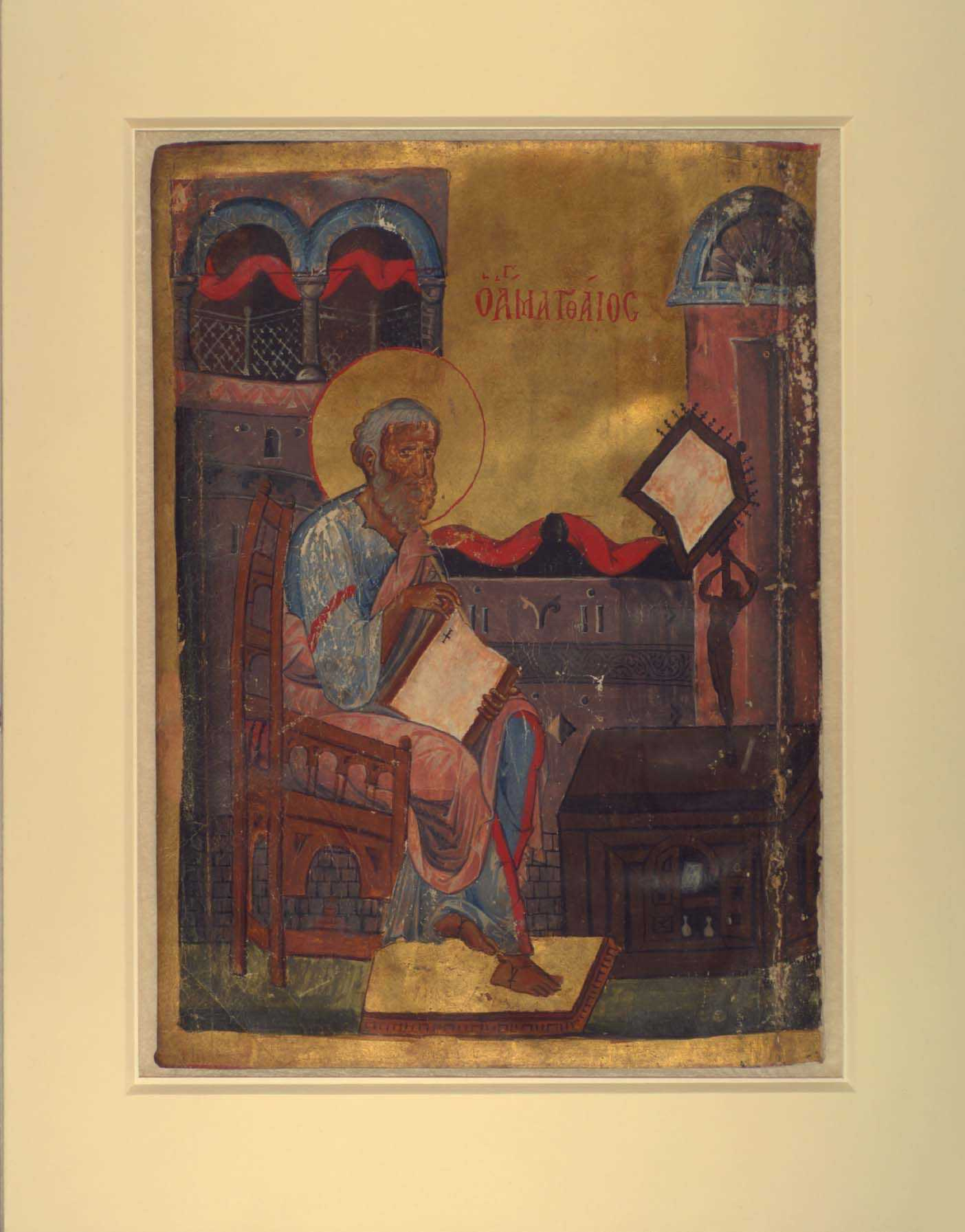
12th-century evangelist portrait of Mark

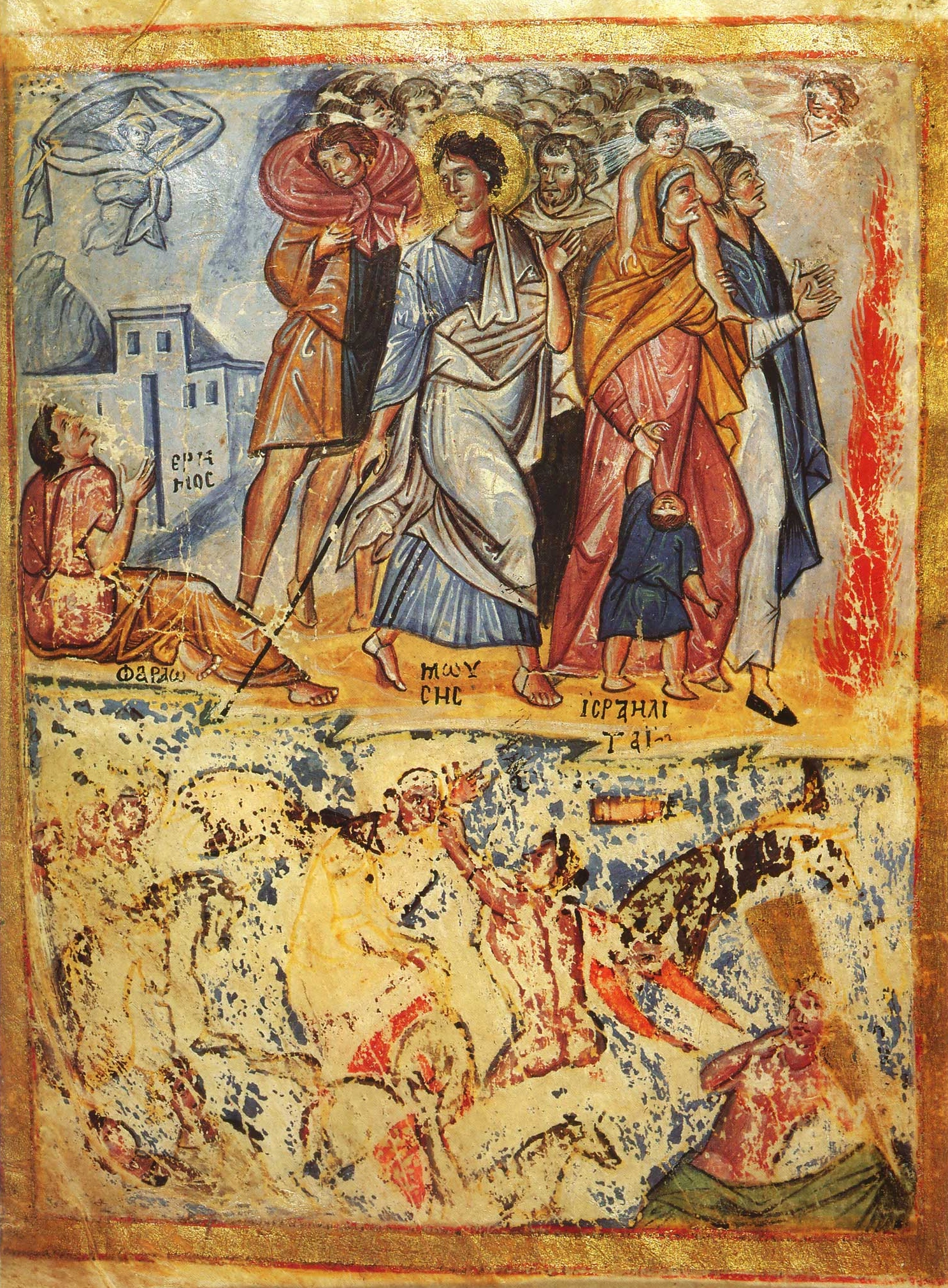
13th-century illumination depicting the Crossing of the Red Sea.

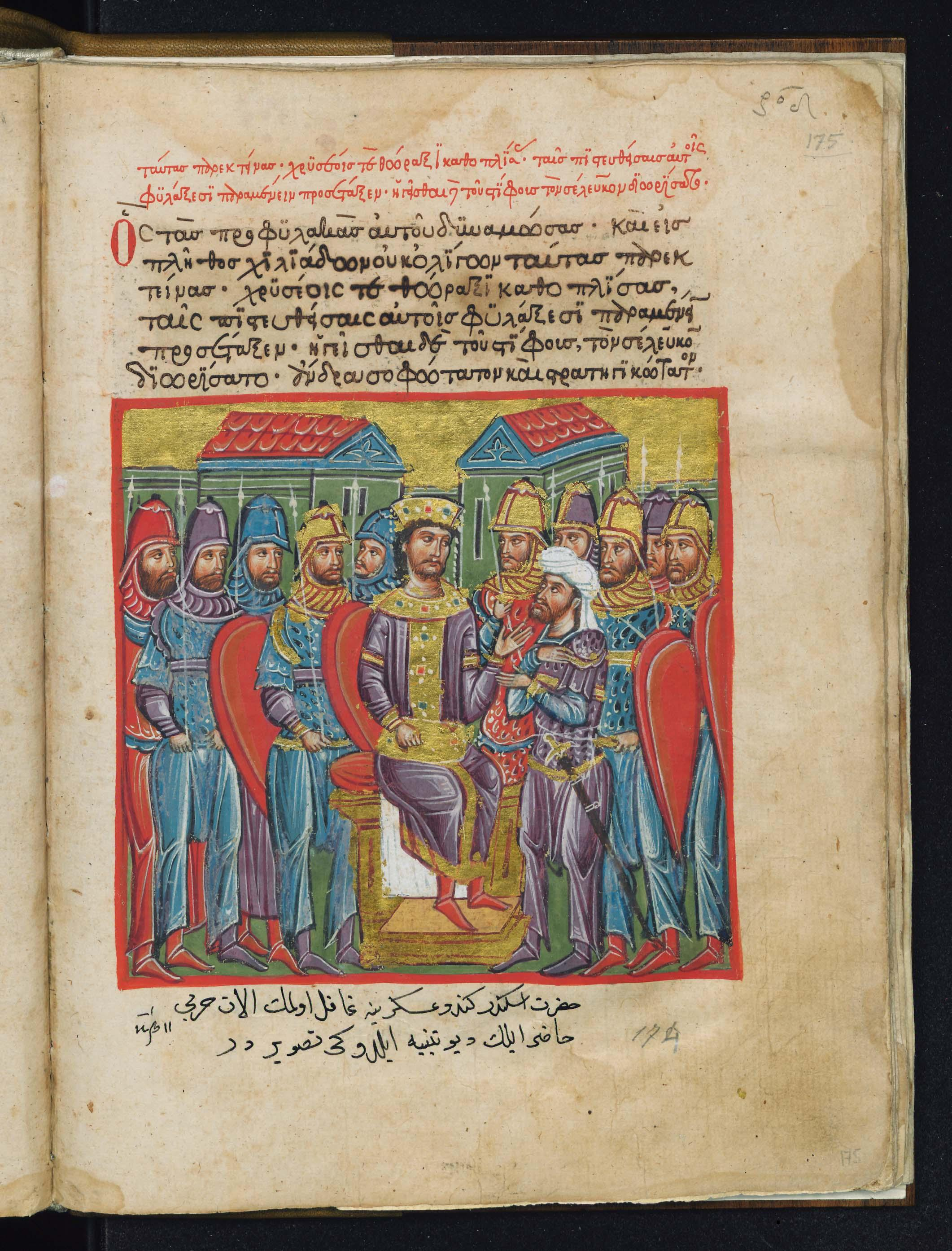
14th-century Greek manuscript depicting the life of Alexander the Great.

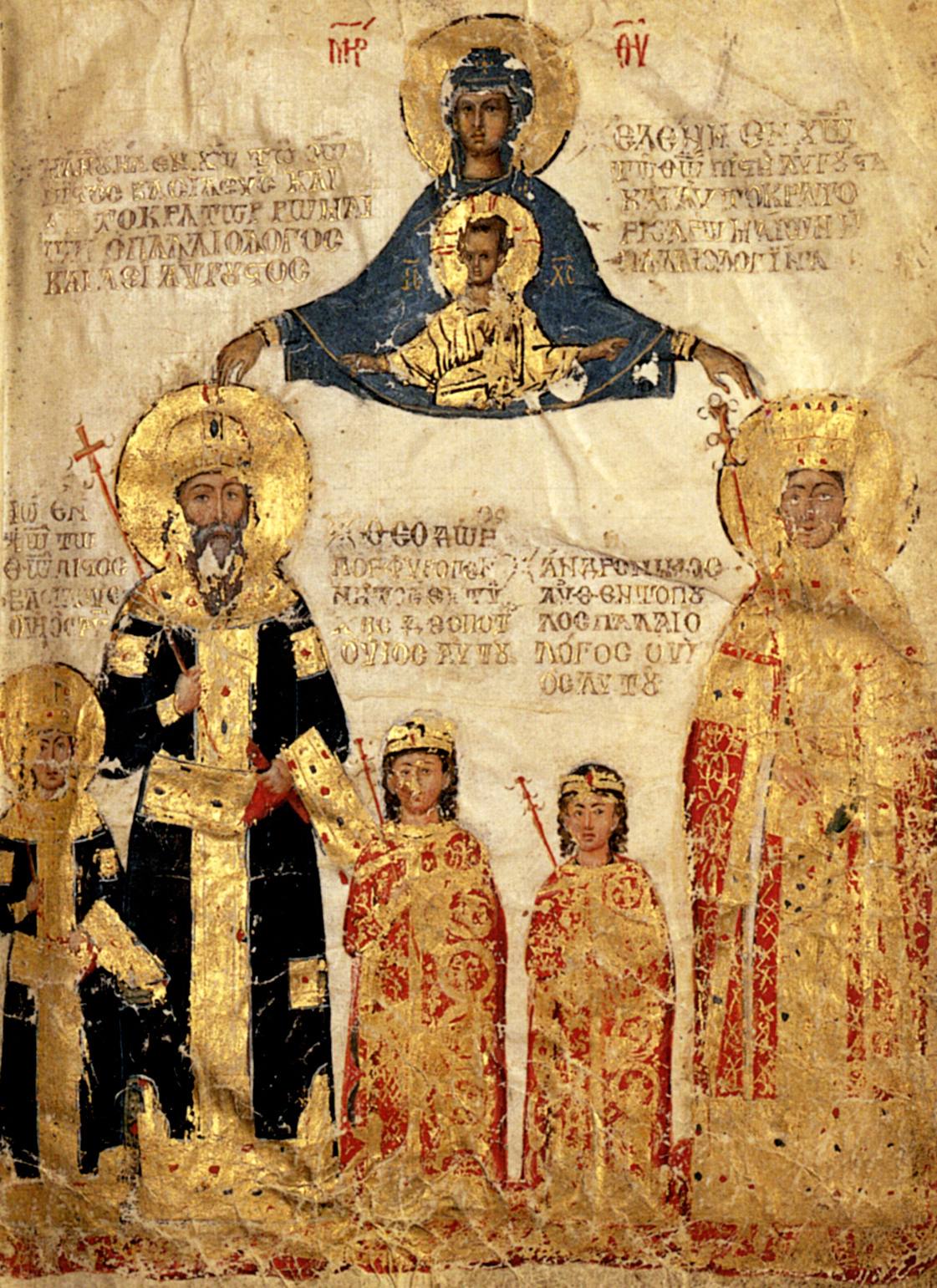
15th century miniature from the Louvre MS. Ivoires 100 manuscript, depicting the Byzantine Emperor Manuel II Palaiologos, Empress Helena and three of their sons.
