= London Canon Tables =

Byzantine-era book of Gospel divisions

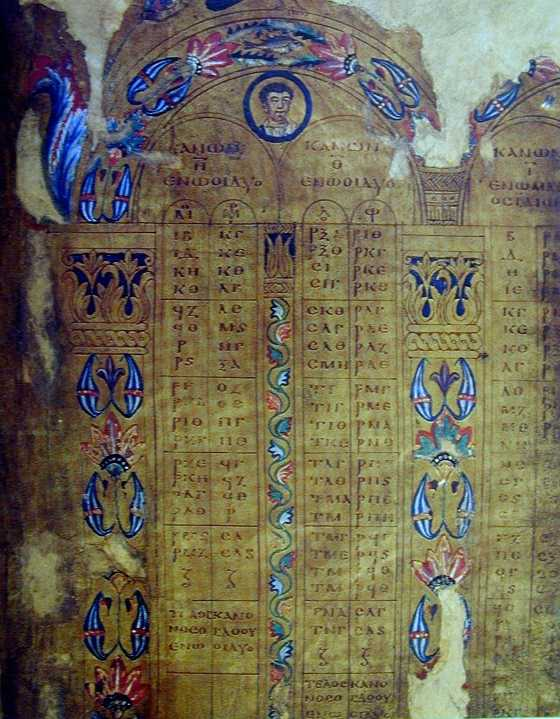
The London Canon Tables are from an early Byzantine manuscript.

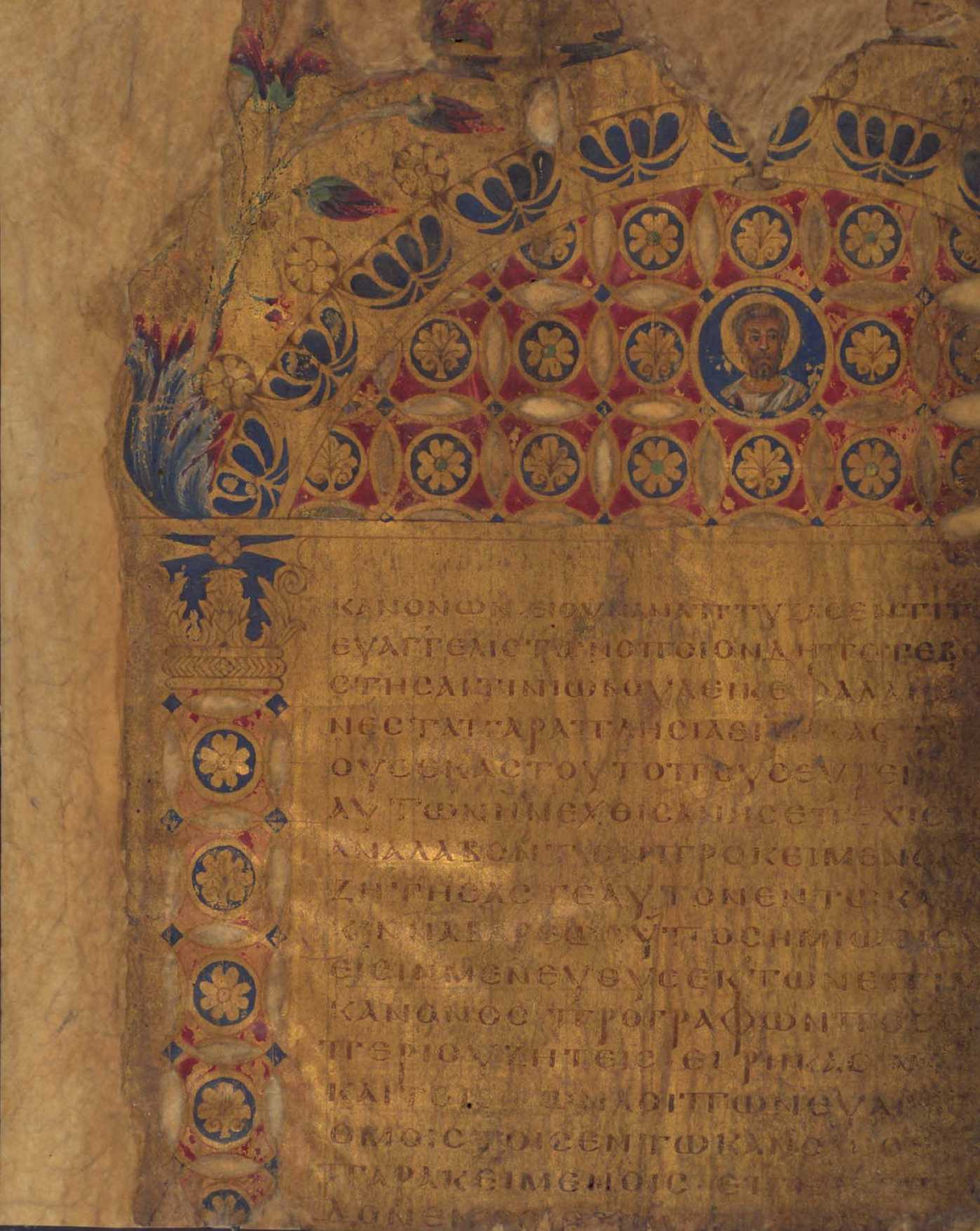
Fragment of Epistula ad Carpianum in London Canon Tables

The London Canon Tables (British Library, Add MS 5111) is a Byzantine illuminated Gospel Book fragment on vellum from the sixth or seventh century. It was possibly made in Constantinople. The fragment consists of two folios of two illuminated canon tables – of unusual construction – set beneath an ornamental arcade and the Letter by Eusebius of Caesarea which usually prefaces canon tables. The fragment is bound together with a twelfth-century Gospel Book (British Library, Add. MS 5111 and 5112) which is thought to have belonged to one of the monasteries on Mount Athos.

The folios are 220 by 150 mm. They were originally larger, but were trimmed to their current size when they were bound with the twelfth century Gospel Book. The two folios are stained gold, an attribute even rarer than purple-stained folios such as are in the Vienna Genesis. The arches and the columns of the arcades are filled by brightly coloured abstract ornamentation. This ornamentation causes the arcade to lose much of its structural sense. Below each of the arches, there is a medallion with a portrait painted in classical style. As there would have been twelve of these arches it is likely these portraits represent the Apostles, although there is no direct connection between the Canon Tables or the letter of Eusebius and the twelve Apostles.

The numbers of corresponding Gospel sections, as listed in the London Canon Tables, differ strikingly from any other surviving manuscript of the Eusebian canons. Eberhard Nestle, who was among the first biblical scholars to call attention to the value of the Eusebian canons for the New Testament textual criticism, dismissed the London Canon Tables as an example of de luxe manuscripts whose "text-critical value stands in reverse proportion to their artistic". The art historian Carl Nordenfalk, however, suggested that the London Canon Tables, "instead of being an example of careless copying, presuppose another section division than that of Eusebius himself".
