= Cotton Genesis =

Greek illuminated manuscript copy of the Book of Genesis

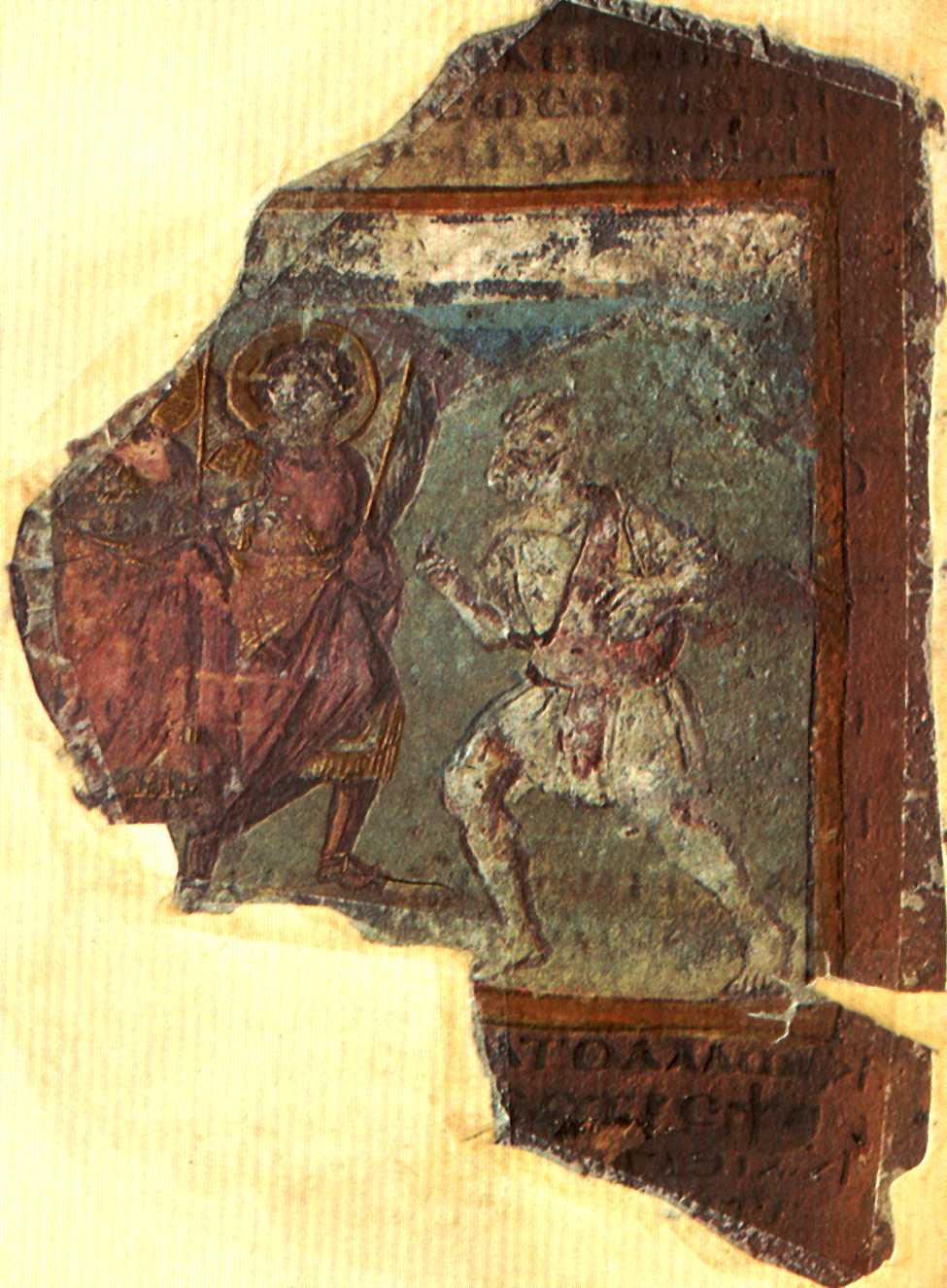
Folio 26v of the Cotton Genesis had a miniature of Abraham meeting Angels.

The Cotton Genesis (London, British Library, Cotton MS Otho B VI) is a 4th- or 5th-century Greek Illuminated manuscript copy of the Book of Genesis. It was a luxury manuscript with many miniatures. It is one of the oldest illustrated biblical codices to survive to the modern period. Most of the manuscript was destroyed in the Cotton library fire in 1731, leaving only eighteen charred, shrunken scraps of vellum. From the remnants, the manuscript appears to have been more than 440 pages with approximately 340–360 illustrations that were framed and inserted into the text column. Many miniatures were also copied in the 17th century and are now in the Bibliothèque nationale de France in Paris (Ms. fr. 9530).

== Description ==
The manuscript contains the text of the Book of Genesis on 35 parchment leaves (size about 27 x 22 cm), with numerous lacunae.

The original codex contained 165 leaves, in the quarto size. It is written in uncial letters, in one column per page, in 27–30 letters per line. The nomina sacra usually are written in an abbreviated forms: Κ̅Σ̅, Κ̅Ν̅, Θ̅Σ̅, Θ̅Ν̅, for κυριος, κυριον, θεος, θεον. It contains some illustrations (e.g. Joseph with his brethren in his own house, on their return into Egypt).

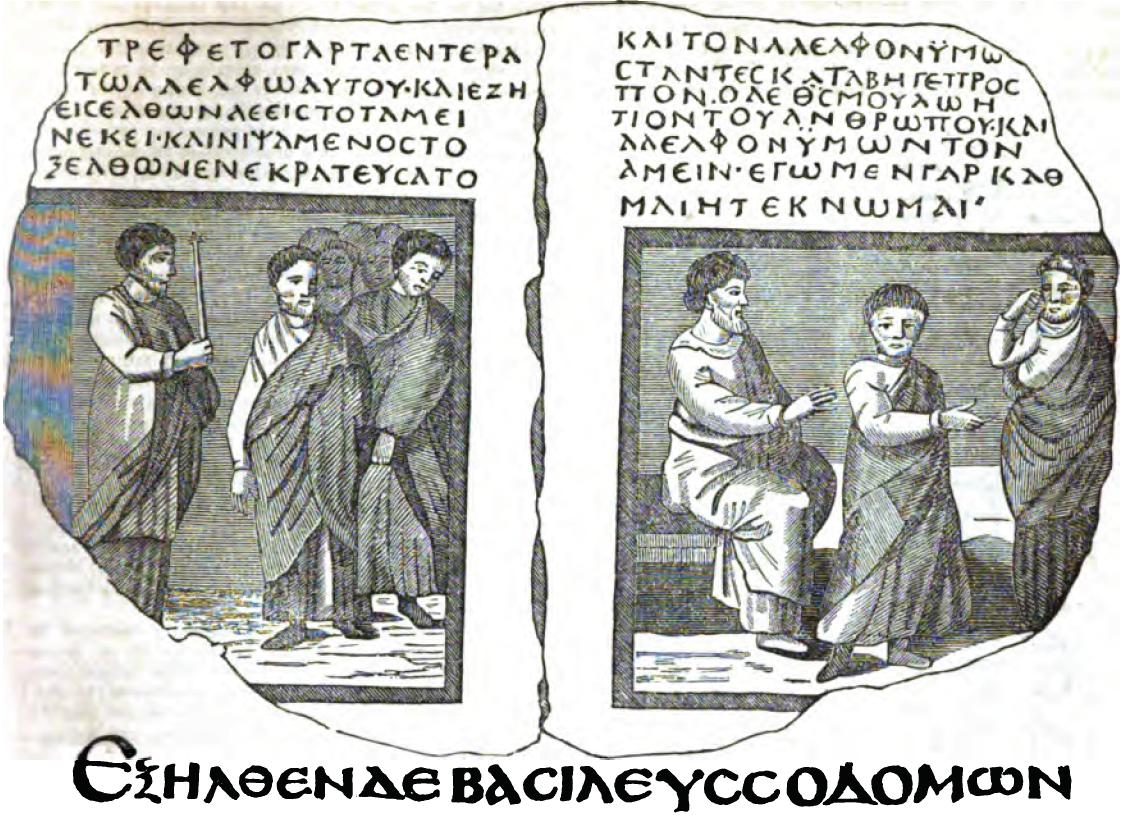
Joseph with his brethren in his own house, on their return into Egypt; illustration to Genesis 43:30-31; from the facsimile Horne's edition (1852)

The miniatures were executed in a late antique style, retaining classical illusionistic qualities. Herbert L. Kessler and Kurt Weitzmann argue that the manuscript was produced in Alexandria, as it exhibits stylistic similarities to other Alexandrian works such as the Charioteer Papyrus.

== History of the codex ==
According to Tischendorf it was written in the 5th century. The Cotton Genesis appears to have been used in the 1220s as the basis for the design of 110 mosaic panels in the narthex of St Mark's Basilica in Venice, presumably after it was brought to Venice following the 1204 sack of Constantinople by the Fourth Crusade.

It was brought from Philippi by two Greek bishops, who presented it to Henry VIII, whom they informed that tradition reported it to have been the identical copy which had belonged to Origen. The manuscript was acquired by Sir Robert Cotton in the 17th century. His collection passed to the British Museum.

In 1731, while the codex was at Ashburnham House with the rest of the collection, it was reduced by fire to a heap of charred and shrivelled leaves. Afterwards the rest of the codex was divided in two parts. One part of it (29 folios) was moved to the British Museum, another to the Bodleian Library.

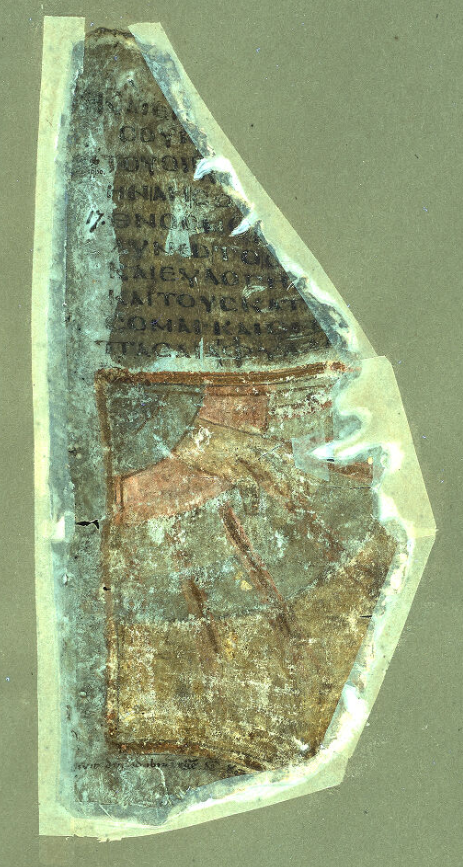
The manuscript is badly burned and nearly impossible to read with the naked eye, but the text and illustrations are visible when photographed in ultraviolet.

Until the middle of the 19th century it was thought to be the oldest manuscript of the Septuagint. According to Thomas Hartwell Horne it was not only the most ancient but the most correct manuscript that is extant. According to Swete the manuscript even before the fire had been imperfect.

Most of the London fragments of the codex were deciphered and published by Constantin von Tischendorf in 1857; the rest of the codex with the Bristol fragments were deciphered by F. W. Gotch in 1881.

In 2026, the British Library conducted a project to digitise the fragments, using multispectral imaging in infrared and ultraviolet light to produce readable photographs of portions too damaged to read with the naked eye.

== See also ==
- Early Christian art and architecture
- Vienna Genesis – another illuminated Greek manuscript of the Book of Genesis
