= Sacra Parallela =

Cranes depicted standing on one leg and flying in formation. From Parisinus Graecus 923, folio 200r.

The Sacra Parallela is a Byzantine florilegium of quotes in Greek from the Bible and patristic texts used in the instruction of ethics, morals and asceticism.

== History ==
The Sacra Parallela was compiled in the eighth century, probably in Palestine. It is usually attributed to John of Damascus, but this is questionable. A tenth-century manuscript names the compilers as "Leontios the priest and John"; the latter is unidentified. It was first printed in 1577. This edition was based on a fifteenth-century manuscript (codex Vat. gr. 1236).

In its original state, the Sacra Parallela existed as three separate books which discussed dealing with God, with Man and with Virtues and Vices respectively. However, the original codex is currently lost to us. Research on this piece is based on later recensions that were made when the original three books became one.

John of Damascus was a proponent for the use of icons during the rise of iconoclasm. Serving as a priest at Mar Saba near Jerusalem, John of Damascus lived under Muslim rule and was safe from persecution for his iconophile views. This could explain why the Parisian manuscript is so heavily illuminated, something not associated with texts that did not tell a story. Although this does not prove his position as author, it does strengthen the possibility that he had ties to the Paris manuscript.

There are three commonly known recensions: The Vatican, the Rupefucaldian and the Parisinus Graecus 923. They were revealed in a study done by Karl Holl in 1897. However, he found that although the Parisinus Graecus 923, a ninth-century piece, was related to the other two recensions, it did not agree with them. Regardless of Holl's findings, due to the manuscript's creation in a time of iconoclasm and its rich use of gold, the piece is still considered very valuable and has been studied to some extent. The images can help researchers reconstruct lost cycles of miniatures prior to iconoclasm. The Parisinus Graecus 923 is the largest and only illuminated Greek florilegium to have survived from the Byzantine era.

== Description ==
The Parisian manuscript is 35.6 x 26.5 centimeters and is bound in pressed leather with clasps dated to the fifteenth century. The contents are written onto 394 folios of thick parchment in sloping uncial above the line. The script is organized into two columns of 36 lines that have 13 to 17 letters each. The height of the letters is around 3 millimeters. In the Parisian codex, the excerpts that are placed under each topic follows this order: Old Testament, New Testament, Church Fathers and philosopher Philo Judaeus and the historian Flavius Josephus.

== Illustrations ==
Miniature from Parisinus Graecus 923, folio 274v, depicting Phinehas running a spear through Zimri and his concubine Cozbi, caught in coitu

Of the 1,658 illustrations within the Sacra Parallela Parisinus Graecus 923, approximately 402 are scenic illustrations and 1,256 are portraits. The placement of images in a manuscript usually follows a pattern. However, as a result of its structure as a florilegium text, the author of the Sacra Parallela lacked any notion of design when distributing the images. Some pages are full of illustrations closely followed by several that do not have any. Passages from the Church Fathers are the lengthiest and since patristic texts rarely have narrative illustrations, they are responsible for the long gaps that lack images. The use of gold was not limited and decorated the draperies, architecture and pieces of landscape within the manuscript. This use of gold was intended to create a spiritual and dematerializing effect. However, it was not used due to a lack of stylistic thought. In fact, the coloring of some of the faces actually reveals a good command of the effect of colors left over from the classical tradition.

The double lines used for the folds in the draperies are not consistent in style hinting at the fact that there was more than one illuminator working on this manuscript. This is not considered unusual due to the sheer number of illustrations. However, this disparity can also be seen in the design and colors used for the faces. Some individuals, such as Josephus Flavius, show a high degree of individuality. Others, like John Chrysostom, are dull and expressionless. Researchers attribute this second style of facial expressions to repetition and not poor skills. Expressions were used when the text called for it, such as grief when Jacob saw Joseph's blood-ridden coat. The artists were also skilled as realistically depicting gestures and motions, shown through Abraham's firm grip on Sarah's wrist. Overall, the styles that were used by the various artists for the creation of the Sacra Parallela were remarkably similar. The variations are not attributed to the different artists, but the fact that the artists gave the most attention to the scenes that they liked and finished the rest in a routine manner.
