= Vienna Genesis =

6th century illuminated manuscript

- Austrian National Library, Vienna
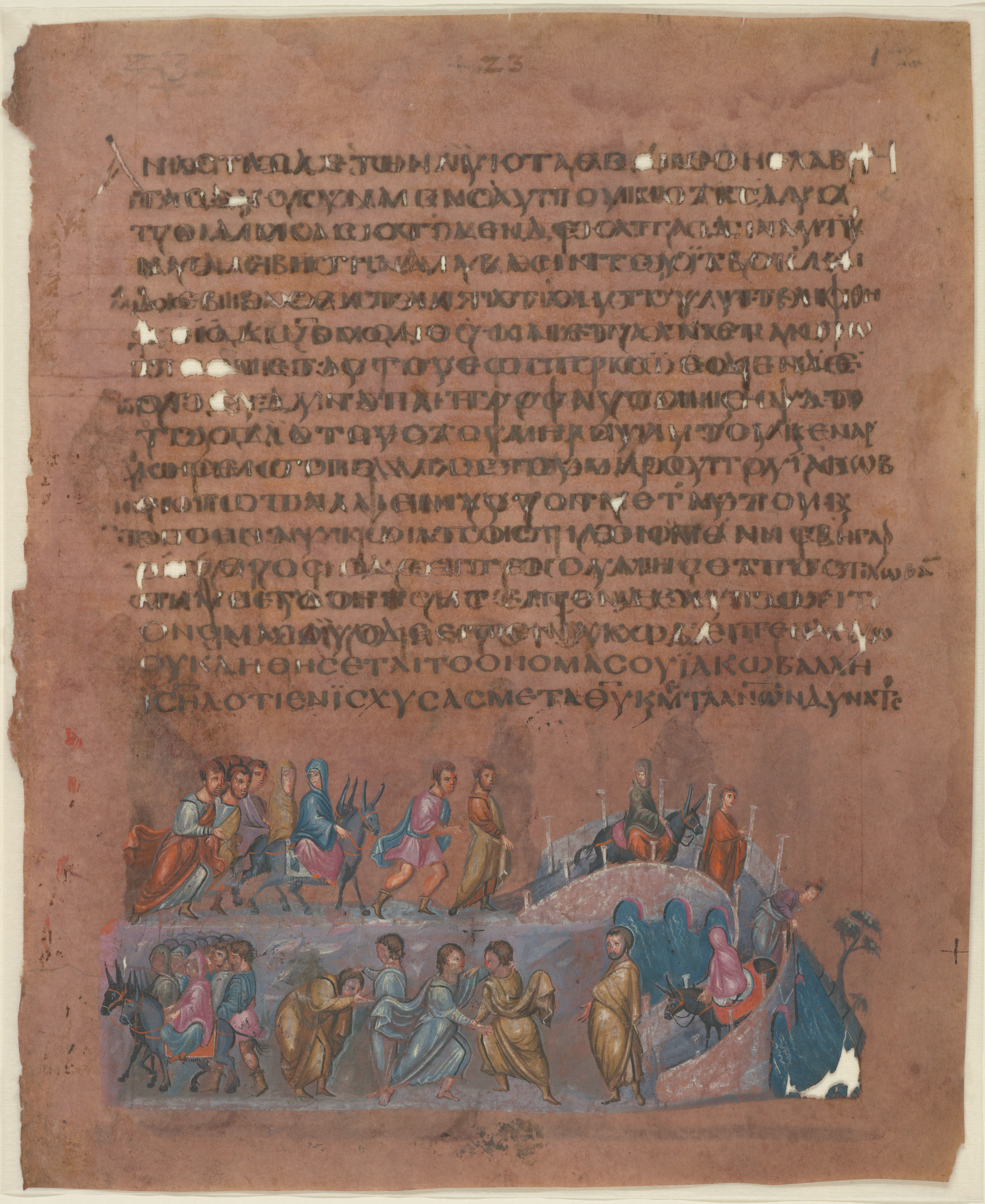
- The illustration on folio 12v from the Vienna Genesis shows the story of Jacob wrestling with the angel
- Type: Illuminated manuscript, codex
- Date: Early 6th century
- Place of origin: Byzantine Syria
- Language: Greek
- Scribe: Unrecorded
- Compiled by: Unrecorded
- Illuminated by: Unrecorded artist(s)
- Patron: Likely wealthy Christian or imperial patron
- Material: Parchment, tempera, gold, and silver
- Size: 31.75 × 23.5 cm (folio)
- Condition: Partially preserved
- Script: Byzantine minuscule
- Contents: Book of Genesis; narrative illustrations of Biblical stories
- Illumination(s): Classical heritage with personifications, modeling, and continuous narration
- Exemplar: Ancient Roman pictorial models

The Vienna Genesis (Vienna, Austrian National Library, cod. theol. gr. 31), designated by siglum L (Ralphs), is an illuminated manuscript, probably produced in Syria in the first half of the 6th century. It is one of the oldest well-preserved, surviving, illustrated biblical codices; only the Garima Gospels of Ethiopia, dating to the 5th and 6th centuries, are as old or older.

The surviving text is part of the Book of Genesis in the Greek Septuagint translation. The text is frequently abbreviated. There are twenty-four surviving folios, each with miniatures at the bottom of both sides. It is thought that there were originally about ninety-six folios and 192 illustrations. The book is written in uncials with silver ink on calfskin dyed a rich purple, placing it very firmly in the category of luxury manuscripts.

The Vienna Genesis relates to the Rossano Gospels and the Sinope Gospels, from roughly the same period.

== Description ==
The illustrations are done in a naturalistic style typical of Late Antique painting. The manuscript's illustrations are, in format, transitional between those found in scrolls and later images found in codices. Each illustration is painted at the bottom of a single page. However, within a single illustration, two or more episodes from a story may be included, so that the same person may be represented multiple times within a single illustration. There are both framed and unframed illustrations. The illustrations contain incidents and people not mentioned in the text of Genesis. These incidents are thought to have been derived from popular elaborations of the story or from Jewish commentaries on the text.

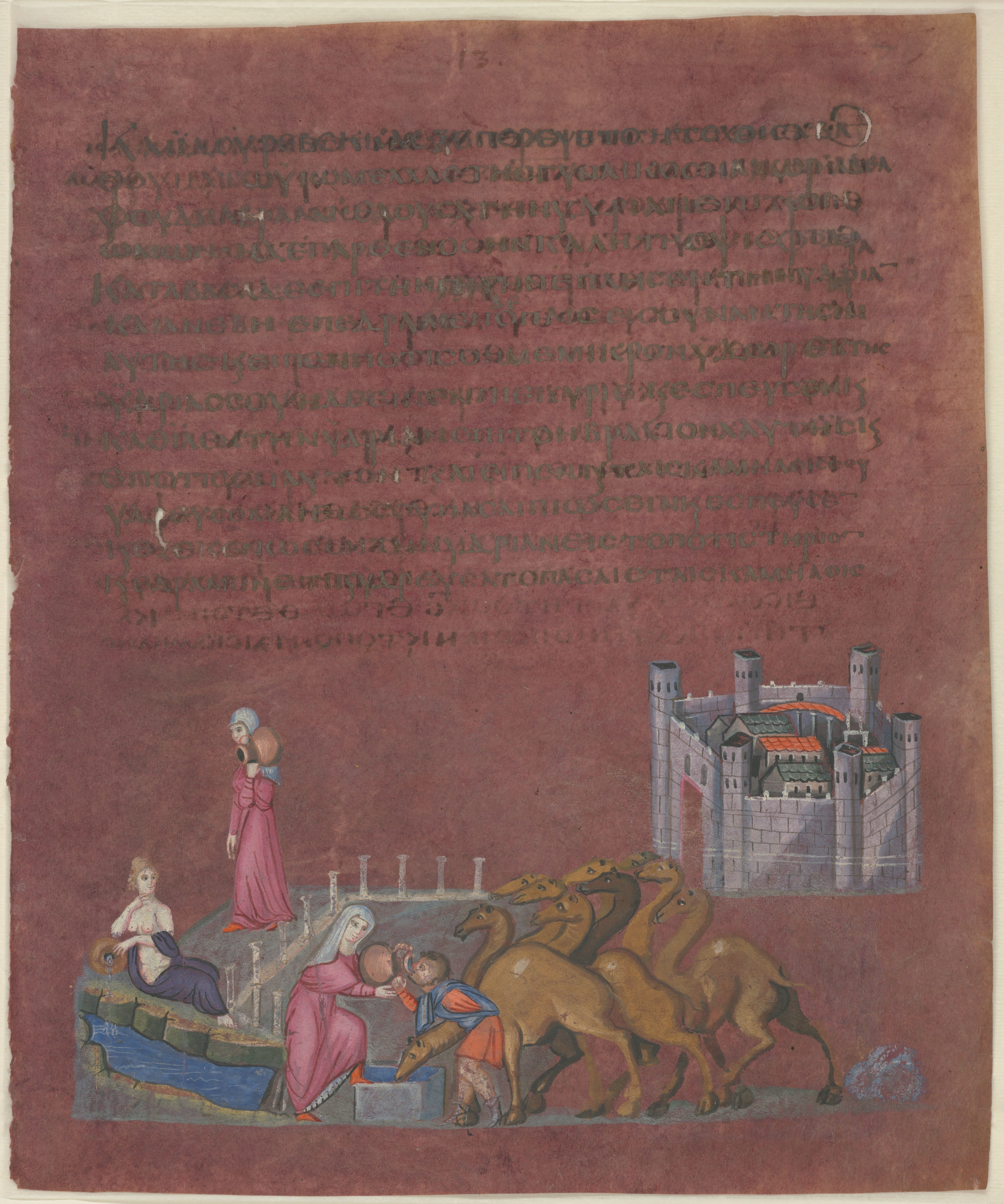
Rebecca and Eliezer at the Well

Rebecca and Eliezer at the Well shows the story of Genesis 24, in which Abraham's servant, Eliezer, goes to look for a wife for Abraham's son, Isaac. As he travels with ten of Abraham's camels, he stops to give them water, prays that Isaac's future wife will assist him with watering his camels, and Rebecca shows up to help Eliezer. Rebecca is depicted twice to illustrate the continued narrative. She wears a pink dress and is depicted walking from a city in the background, holding a water jug on her shoulder, towards a body of water, next to which lounges a classically inspired female personification. Rebecca is illustrated a second time at the well with Eliezer.

The illustration of Jacob Wrestling The Angel depicts a scene from Genesis 32, where Jacob wrestles with an angel all night. In the illustration, Jacob is shown holding onto the angel's cloak while the angel reaches out to touch him. Similar to Rebecca at the Well, the figures are painted in profile, with elongated bodies and exaggerated facial features. The use of gold and silver paint, as well as intricate detailing in the clothing and hair, adds to the richness of the image. The story follows Jacob, in the brown and reddish tunic, who wakes up and leads his family across the river. In his trail following him are his wives on donkeys and many servants. After crossing the river Jacob is then seen meeting an angel, seen wrestling the angel, and then the angel blesses him. There are multiple depictions of Jacob shown here to show multiple points of the story. From this story, as read in Genesis the book, Jacob is therefore blessed as Israel, and is blessed by God for the rest of his life. The bridge's architectural forms include a colonnade with Roman columns which references classical architecture as it adapts to the scroll perspective.

The initial iota and upsilon have the diaeresis.

== See also ==
- Early Christian art and architecture
- Cotton Genesis – another illuminated Greek manuscript of the Book of Genesis
