= Textual variants in the First Epistle to the Corinthians =

Textual variants in the First Epistle to the Corinthians are the subject of the study called textual criticism of the New Testament. Textual variants in manuscripts arise when a copyist makes deliberate or inadvertent alterations to a text that is being reproduced. An abbreviated list of textual variants in this particular book is given in this article below.

Most of the variations are not significant and some common alterations include the deletion, rearrangement, repetition, or replacement of one or more words when the copyist's eye returns to a similar word in the wrong location of the original text. If their eye skips to an earlier word, they may create a repetition (error of dittography). If their eye skips to a later word, they may create an omission. They may resort to performing a rearranging of words to retain the overall meaning without compromising the context. In other instances, the copyist may add text from memory from a similar or parallel text in another location. Otherwise, they may also replace some text of the original with an alternative reading. Spellings occasionally change. Synonyms may be substituted. A pronoun may be changed into a proper noun (such as "he said" becoming "Jesus said"). John Mill's 1707 Greek New Testament was estimated to contain some 30,000 variants in its accompanying textual apparatus which was based on "nearly 100 [Greek] manuscripts." Peter J. Gurry puts the number of non-spelling variants among New Testament manuscripts around 500,000, though he acknowledges his estimate is higher than all previous ones.

== Legend ==
This is a guide to the sigla (symbols and abbreviations) most frequently used in citations of source material for a Greek New Testament (NT) manuscript. Editors of a scholarly critical text of the NT use each siglum to shrink the space needed for listing witnesses to a particular reading in the critical apparatus. The intended reader, a Bible translator, scholar, orator, or student, needs to know these abbreviations, e.g. for deciding whether to use alternative readings of the critical text or to understand the origin and attestation of a particular passage.

General sigla

# beginning with 0: uncial
# not beginning with 0: minuscule
^{*} superscript: original reading
^{app} superscript: the critical apparatus reading
^{c} superscript: scribal correction
^{com} superscript: Biblical commentary reading
^{1,2,3...} superscripts: 1st, 2nd, 3rd... scribal corrections
^{v.l.} superscript: varia lectio, i.e. alternative reading
^{mg} superscript: reading in the margin
^{ms} superscript: individual manuscript
^{mss} superscript: multiple manuscripts
^{pt} superscript: partial attestation
^{s} superscript: reading in a supplement to the text
^{txt} superscript: the reading of the text
^{vid} superscript: apparent but uncertain reading
aeth or eth: Ethiopic versions
al: alii: i.e., others
arab: Arabic versions
arm: Armenian versions
Byz: Byzantine text-type in the Catholic letters and superscript:

pt: a part of the Codices Byzantini

cop: Coptic versions

ac or akh: Akhmimic version
ac^{2}: Subakhmimic or Lycopolitanic version
bo: Boharic version
cv: Dialect V
cw: Dialect W
fa or fay or mf: Fayyumic Version
mae: Middle Egyptian or Mesokemic version
pbo: Proto-Bohartic version
sa: Sahidic version

ƒ: individually-numbered Greek manuscript family - superscripts:

1: Family 1
13: Family 13

geo: Georgian versions
goth: Gothic versions
𝕲: The Greek Old Testament text, i.e. Septuagint (LXX)
𝕳: The Hebrew Old Testament text, i.e. the Masoretic Text
it: Italic/Vetus Latina, lowercase letters for individual Old Latin manuscripts
lat: most Italic and Vulgate
latt: all Italic and Vulgate, Masoretic Text
P or 𝔓: papyrus
𝑙 or ℓ: individually numbered lectionary
Lect: most or all numbered lectionaries
𝔐: Greek Majority text and superscripts:

A: Andreas of Caesarea commentary in Revelation
C: Complutensian tradition
K: the Koine tradition in Revelation

o: omits
parenthesized (): reading or witness with a slight difference
pc: pauci: i.e., few
pm: permulti: i.e., many
rell: all other extant manuscripts
slav: Slavic versions in Old Church Slavonic
syr or sy: Syriac versions and superscripts:

c or cur: Curetonian Gospels
s: Sinaitic Palimpsest
h: Harclean Syriac
hmg: Harclean Syriac, margin
pal: Palestinian Syriac
p: the Peshitta

vg: Latin Vulgate and superscripts:

cl: Editio Clementina
s: Editio Sixtina
st: Vulgata Stuttgartiensis 2007
ww: Wordsworth/White Vulgate

Greek Uncials (siglum or leading 0)

א: Codex Sinaiticus (01)
A: Codex Alexandrinus (02)
B: Codex Vaticanus (03)
C: Codex Ephraemi Rescriptus (04)
D^{ea}: Codex Bezae (05)
D^{p}: Codex Claromontanus (06)
E: Codex Basilensis A. N. III. 12 (07)
E^{a}: Codex Laudianus (08)
F^{e}: Codex Boreelianus (09)
F^{p}: Codex Augiensis (010)
G^{e}: Codex Seidelianus I (011)
G^{p}: Codex Boernerianus (012)
H^{e}: Codex Seidelianus II (013)
H^{a}: Codex Mutinensis (014)
H^{p}: Codex Coislinianus (015)
I: Codex Freerianus (016)
K^{e}: Codex Cyprius (017)
K^{ap}: Codex Mosquensis I (018)
L^{e}: Codex Regius (New Testament) (019)
L^{ap}: Codex Angelicus (020)
M: Codex Campianus (021)
N: Codex Petropolitanus Purpureus (022)
O: Sinope Gospels (023)
P^{e}: Codex Guelferbytanus A (024)
P^{apr}: Codex Porphyrianus (025)
Q: Codex Guelferbytanus B (026)
R: Codex Nitriensis (027)
S: Codex Vaticanus 354 (028)
T: Codex Borgianus (029)
U: Codex Nanianus (030)
V: Codex Mosquensis II (031)
W: Codex Washingtonianus (032)
X: Codex Monacensis (X 033) (033)
Y: Codex Macedoniensis (034)
Z: Codex Dublinensis (035)
Γ: Codex Tischendorfianus IV (036)
Δ: Codex Sangallensis 48 (037)
Θ: Codex Koridethi (038)
Λ: Codex Tischendorfianus III (039)
Ξ: Codex Zacynthius (040)
Π: Codex Petropolitanus (New Testament) (041)
Σ: Codex Purpureus Rossanensis (042)
Φ: Codex Beratinus (043)
Ψ: Codex Athous Lavrensis (044)
Ω: Codex Athous Dionysiou (045)
0189: Uncial 0189
Other Uncials

Vetus Latina (Old Latin) Uncials (lower-case letters)

it: with superscripts:

^{a}: Codex Vercellensis
^{b}: Codex Veronensis
^{e}: Codex Palatinus
ff^{1}: Codex Corbeiensis I
ff^{2}: Codex Corbeiensis II
g^{1}: Codex Sangermanensis I
^{j}: Codex Purpureus Sarzanensis
^{k}: Codex Bobiensis

Other important manuscripts and sources

Lectionaries
See List of New Testament lectionaries
ℓ 185: Lectionary 185
ℓ 249: Lectionary 249
Papyri
See List of New Testament papyri
𝔓^{45}: Papyrus 45 (P. Chester Beatty I)
𝔓^{66}: Papyrus 66
Greek Miniscules
See Lists of New Testament minuscules (no leading 0)
33: Minuscule 33
2344: Minuscule 2344
The Diatessaron gospel harmony
Latin Vulgate manuscripts (capital letters)
vg^{A}: Codex Amiatinus
vg^{Σ}: Codex Sangallensis 1395
vg^{F}: Codex Fuldensis
gig: Codex Gigas (Old Latin in Acts and Revelation)
Church Fathers are cited when relevant
Ju: Justin Martyr
Or: Origen
Dion: Dionysius of Alexandria
Tert: Tertullian

Printed New Testaments - critical and eclectic texts

Latin and Greek Majority texts
E: Erasmus, Novum Instrumentum omne (1516)
ς: The Textus Receptus (so-called) of Robert Estienne (1550)
Beza's Greek and Latin New Testament (1565 to 1611)
M: John Mill, Novum Testamentum Graecum, etc. (1707)
Bengel, Novum Testamentum Graecum (1734)
Wettstein, Novum Testamentum Graecum, etc. (1751)
Ma: Matthaei, Novum Testamentum Graecum, etc. (1803)
Griesbach, Novum Testamentum Graece, etc. (1809 to 1823)
L: Lloyd, Novum Testamentum Graecum (1828, 1836)
Ln: Lachmann, Novum Testamentum Graece et Latine (Greek and Latin, 1842, 1850)
Scr: Scrivener's Greek New Testaments (1877 to 1894)
𝔚: Wordsworth-White, Nouum Testamentum Domini nostri Jesu Christi latine (Latin, 1889)
vS: von Soden, Die Schriften des neuen Testaments, etc. (1902 to 1910)
Farstad and Hodges, The Greek New Testament According to the Majority Text with Apparatus (1982)
Modern Greek NTs with substantially Alexandrian texts
𝔗 or T8th: Tischendorf, Editio Octava Critica Maior (1864 to 1894)
WH: Westcott and Hort, The New Testament in the Original Greek (1881)
Weiss, Das Neue Testament (1894)
NA: Novum Testamentum Graece, Nestle–Aland, NA28 is latest (1898-)
UBS: United Bible Societies, Greek New Testament, UBS5 is latest (1966-)
ECM: Editio Critica Maior, updates to Tischendorf's 8th edition (1997-) (in progress)

== Textual variants ==
Textual variants in the First Epistle to the Corinthians

1 Textual variants in 1 Corinthians 1

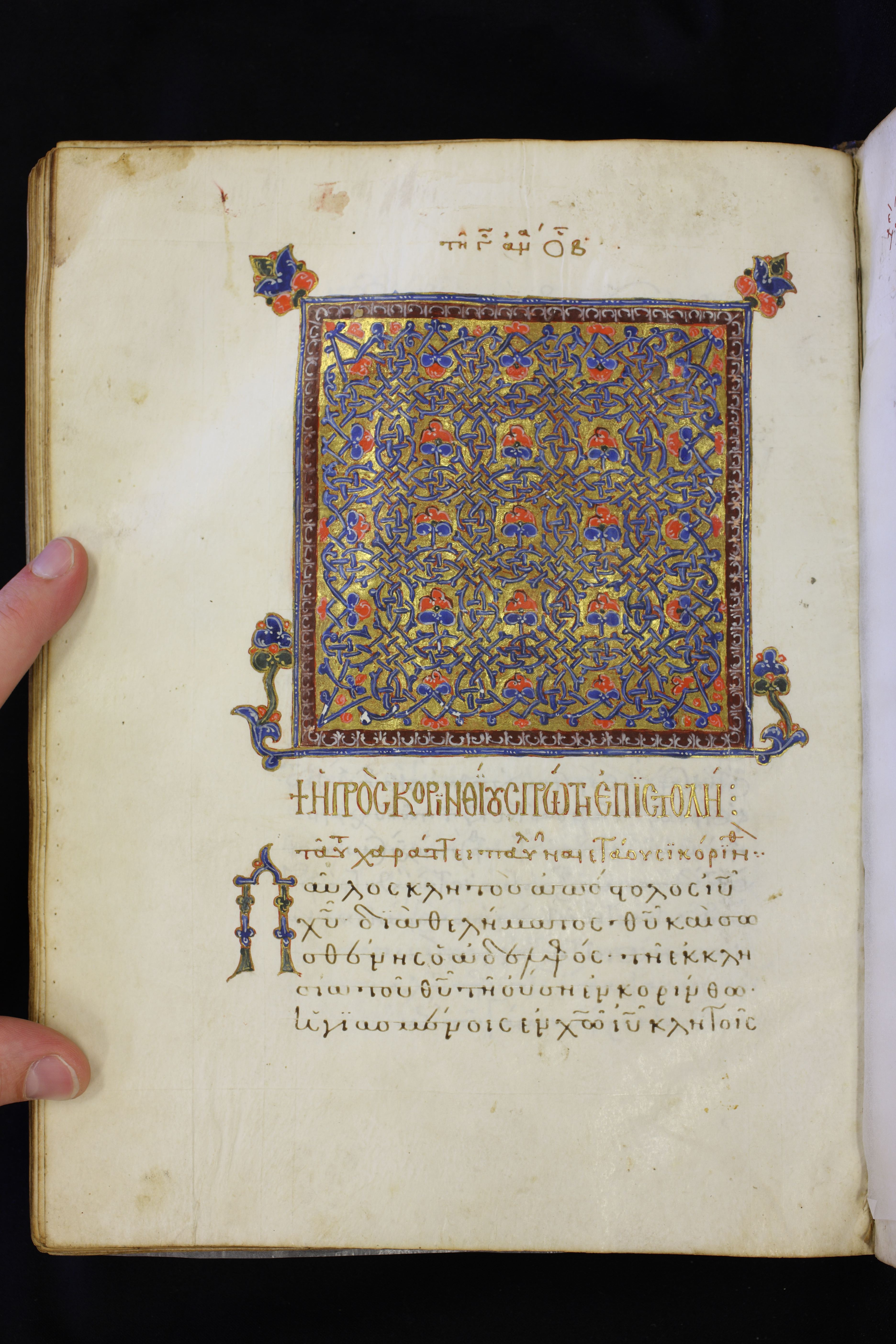
The first page of 1 Corinthians in Minuscule 223 (14th century)

1 Corinthians 1:8

ημερα – majority
παρουσια – D F G

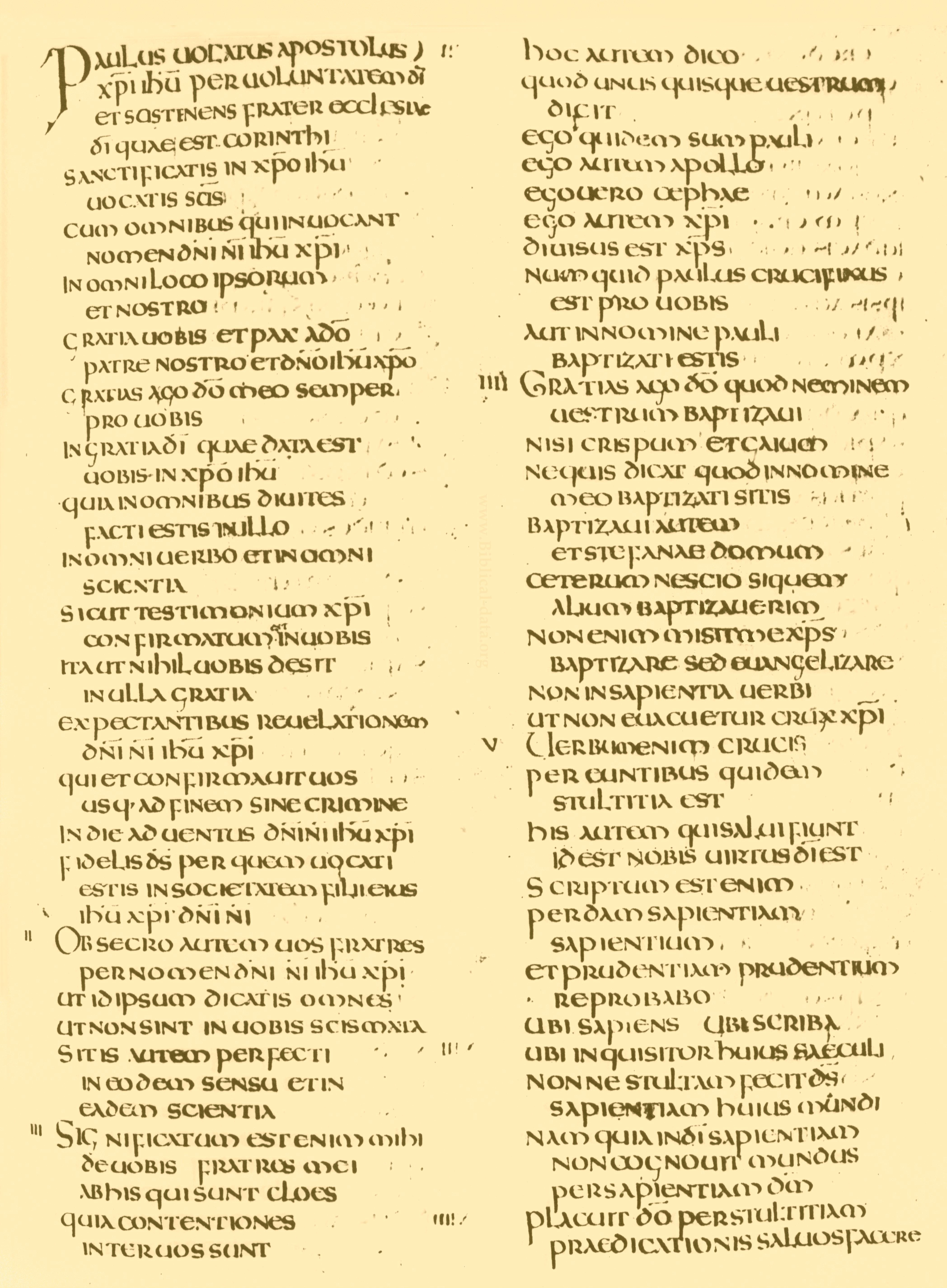
Codex Amiatinus (~700 CE) with text of 1 Corinthians 1:1-21

3 Textual variants in 1 Corinthians 2

1 Corinthians 2:1

μυστηριον – 𝔓^{46}, א, Α, C, 88, 436, it^{a,r}, syr^{p}, cop^{bo}
μαρτυριον – B D G P Ψ 33 81 104 181 326 330 451 614 629 630 1241 1739 1877 1881 1962 1984 2127 2492 2495 Byz Lect it vg syr^{h} cop^{sa} arm eth
ευαγγελιον – Theodoret
σωτηριον – 489, ℓ 598^{pt}, ℓ 599

1 Corinthians 2:4

πειθοις σοφιας λογοις (plausible words of wisdom) – (א λογος) B (D^{gr} 33 πιθοις) D^{c} 181 1739 1877 1881 it^{r1} vg^{ww} eth
πειθοις σοφιας (plausible wisdom) – 𝔓^{46} G^{gr}
πειθοι σοφιας (plausible wisdom) – 35 it^{f,g}
πειθοις ανθρωπινης σοφιας λογοις – C Ψ (A P 326 330 πιθοις) 81 88 104 436 451 614 629 1241 1984 2127 2492 Byz vg^{cl} syr^{h} cop^{bo}
πειθοις ανθρωπινης σοφιας – 630
πειθοις ανθρωπινης σοφιας και λογοις – 131

1 Corinthians 2:14

του θεου – 𝔓^{11}, 𝔓^{46}, א, A, B, C, D, G, P, Ψ, 33, 81, 88, 104, 181, 326, 436, 614, 629, 630, 1241, 1739, 1877, 1881, 1962, 1985, 2127, 2492, 2495, Byz, Lect, it, vg, syr^{h}, cop, arm
αγιου – eth
omitted by 2 216 255 330 440 451 823 1827 syr^{p}

2 Textual variants in 1 Corinthians 3

1 Corinthians 3:3

ἔρις – 𝔓^{11}, א, B, C, P, Ψ, 81, 181, 630, 1739, 1877, 1881, it, vg
ἔρεις – A
ἔρις διχοστασία – 623, Chrysostom
ἔρις καί διχοστασίαι – 𝔓^{46}, D, 33, 88, 104, 181, 326, 330, 436, 451, 614, 629, 1241, 1984, 1985, 2127, 2492, 2495, Byz, Lect
ἔρις καί ἀρχοστασία – 1962
ἔρεις καί διχοστασίαι – G^{a}

1 Corinthians 3:4

ουκ ανθρωποι – 𝔓^{46}, Sinaiticus, Alexandrinus, Vaticanus, Ephraemi, 33, 81, 1175, 1506, 1739, 1881;
ουχι σαρκικοι – Sinaiticus^{2}, Ψ, and the Byzantine manuscripts read;
ουχι ανθρωποι – D F G 629;

1 Textual variants in 1 Corinthians 5

1 Corinthians 5:5

κυρίου – 𝔓^{46}, B, 630, 1739, Marcion, Tertulian, Origen
κυρίου Ἰησοῦ – א, Ψ, 81, 181, 326, 614, 1877, 1985, 2492, 2495, Byz, Lect
κυρίου Ἰησοῦ Χριστοῦ – D, 1984
Ἰησοῦ Χριστοῦ – 629
κυρίου ἡμῶν Ἰησοῦ – 048, cop^{bo}, eth
κυρίου ἡμῶν Ἰησοῦ Χριστοῦ – A, F, G, P, 33, 88, 104, 330, 436, 451, 629, 241, 1881, 1962, 2127, it, vg, syr^{p, h}, cop^{sa, bo}, arm, Origen

2 Textual variants in 1 Corinthians 7

1 Corinthians 7:5

τη προσευχη (prayer) – 𝔓^{11}, 𝔓^{46}, א*, A, B, C, D, F, G, P, Ψ, 33, 81, 104, 181, 629, 630, 1739, 1877, 1881, 1962, it vg, cop, arm, eth
τη νηστεια και τη προσευχη (fasting and prayer) – א^{c}, K, L, 88, 326, 436, 614, 1241, 1984, 1985, 2127, 2492, 2495, Byz, Lect, syr^{p,h}, goth
τη προσευχη και νηστεια (prayer and fasting) – 330, 451, John of Damascus

1 Corinthians 7:14

αδελφω – 𝔓^{46}, א*, A, B, C, D, F, G, P, Ψ, 33, 181, 1739, 1877, 1962, d, e, f, g, cop
ανδρι – א^{c}, D^{c}, K, L, 81, 88, 104, 326, 330, 436, 451, 614, 630, 1241, 1881, 1984, 1985, 2127, 2492, 2495, Byz, Lect, syr^{h}, goth, arm, eth
ανδρι τω πιστω – 629 it

1 Textual variants in 1 Corinthians 9

1 Corinthians 9:20

μη ων αυτος υπο νομον (being not himself under the law) – omitted by D^{2} K (L) Ψ 81 88 326 330 424 451 460 614 629^{c} 1241 1518 1852 1881 1984 1985 2138 2464 2492 Byz Lect syr^{p} eth geo slav Origen^{pt} Nestorius Theodoret

1 Textual variants in 1 Corinthians 10

1 Corinthians 10:9

Χριστον – 𝔓^{46} D G K Ψ 88 330 451 614 629 630 1241 1739 1881 1984 2492 2495 Byz Lect
κυριον – א, B, C, P, 33, 104, 181, 326, 436, 1877, 2127
θεον – A, 81
omit by 1985

1 Textual variants in 1 Corinthians 11

1 Corinthians 11:24

υμων – 𝔓^{46}, א*, A, B, C*, 33, 1739, arm
υμων κλωμενον – א^{c}, C^{3}, D^{b,c}, G, K, Ψ, 81, 88, 104, 181, 326, 330, 436, 451, 614, 629, 630, 1241, 1739^{mg}, 1877, 1881, 1962, 1984, 1985, 2127, 2492, 2495, Byz, Lect
υμων θρυπτομενον – D^{gr}
υμων διδομενον – c, dem, f, t, x, z^{c}, vg (tradetur), cop, eth

1 Textual variants in 1 Corinthians 12

1 Corinthians 12:9

χαρισματα ιαματων εν τω ενι πνευματι – A B 33 81 104 436 630 1881 it vg
χαρισματα ιαματων εν πνευματι – 1739
χαρισματα ιαματων εν τω αυτω πνευματι – א C^{3} D G K P 0201 88 181 330 451 614 629 1241 1877 1962 1984 1985 2127 2492 2495 Byz Lect
χαρισματα ιαματων εν τω πνευματι – 𝔓^{46}
χαρισματα ιαματων – C
χαρισματα – Ψ

4 Textual variants in 1 Corinthians 13

1 Corinthians 13:2

κἂν ἐὰν ἔχω προφητείαν – Westcott and Hort / [NA27 and UBS4 variants]
κἂν ἔχω προφητείαν – Westcott and Hort 1881
καὶ ἔχω προφητείαν – Westcott and Hort / [NA27 and UBS4 variants]
καὶ ἐὰν ἔχω προφητείαν – Tischendorf 8th Edition, Nestle 1904, Byz.

1 Corinthians 13:2

κἂν ἐὰν ἔχω πᾶσαν – Westcott and Hort / [NA27 and UBS4 variants]
κἂν ἔχω πᾶσαν – Westcott and Hort 1881
καὶ ἔχω πᾶσαν – Westcott and Hort / [NA27 and UBS4 variants]
καὶ ἐὰν ἔχω πᾶσαν – Tischendorf 8th Edition, Nestle 1904, Byz.

1 Corinthians 13:2

μεθιστάναι (to (re)move/(ex)change)– Alexandrian text-type, Tischendorf 8th Edition, Nestle 1904, Westcott and Hort / [NA27 and UBS4 variants]
μεθιστάνειν – Byz., Westcott and Hort 1881, Westcott and Hort / [NA27 and UBS4 variants]

1 Corinthians 13:3

καυχήσωμαι (I may boast) – Alexandrian text-type. By 2009, many translators and scholars had come to favour this variant as the original reading on the grounds that is probably the oldest.
καυθήσωμαι (I may be burnt/burned) – Mostly Western and Byzantine text-type MSS and "a majority of patristic writers". In 1989, this was the most commonly favoured variant by translators and scholars, but because it is probably not the oldest variant, and may be grammatically incorrect, a large amount of translators and scholars had abandoned it by 2009. Malone (2009) objected that it would be somewhat unlikely that a supposedly correct original (καυχήσωμαι) would have been deliberately 'corrected' by a scribe, resulting in a supposedly incorrect variant (καυθήσωμαι).
καυθήσομαι (I will be burnt/burned) – As of 2009, a minority of scholars favoured this reading as the original.
? –
? –
καθήσωμαι – 330*
καυθήσεται – 1877 2492 Syr^{p,h} Clem
καυθήσηται – John of Damascus

1 Textual variants in 1 Corinthians 14

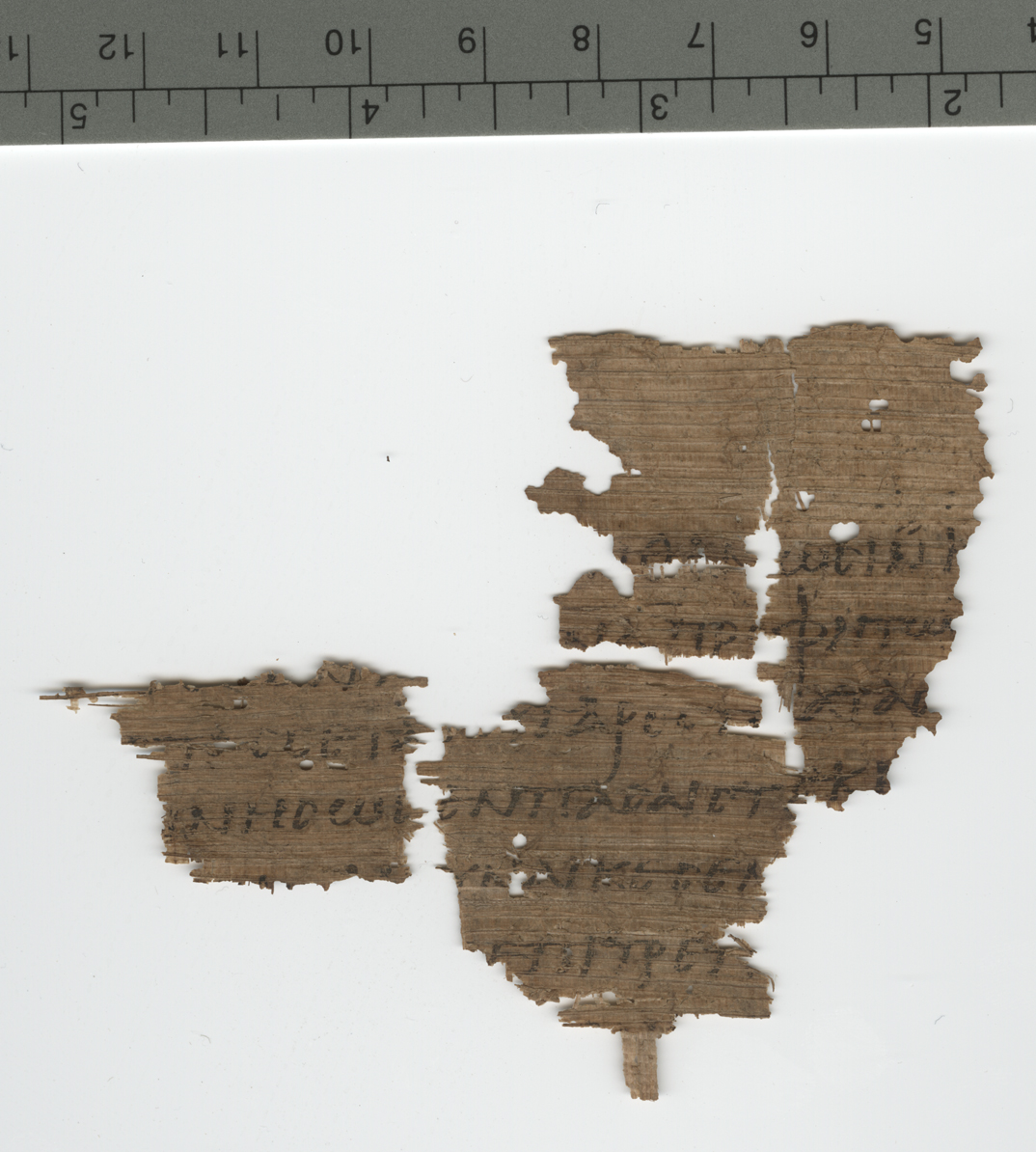
1 Corinthians 14:31-34 from 𝔓^{123}

1 Corinthians 14:40

verses 14:34-35 included after 14:40 – D F G 88

4 Textual variants in 1 Corinthians 15

1 Corinthians 15:3

ὃ καὶ παρέλαβον (I received) – omitted by b, Ambrosiaster, Irenaeus^{lat}, Tertullian?

1 Corinthians 15:15

εἴπερ ἄρα νεκροὶ οὐκ ἐγείρονται (if in fact the dead do not rise) – omitted by D, a, b, r, bam, ful**, harl*, kar, mon, reg, val*, pesh, Ambrosiaster, Irenaeus (lat), Tertullian?

1 Corinthians 15:47

δευτερος ανθρωπος – א*, B, C, D, F, G, 0243, 33, 1739, it, vg, cop^{bo} eth
δευτερος ο κυριος – 630
δευτερος ανθρωπος ο κυριος – א^{c}, A, D^{c}, K, P, Ψ, 81, 104, 181, 326, 330, 436, 451, 614, 629, 1241, 1739^{mg}, 1877, 1881, 1984, 1985, 2127, 2492, 2495, Byz, Lect
δευτερος ανθρωπος πνευματικος – 𝔓^{46}
δευτερος – cop^{sa} Cyril

1 Corinthians 15:51

μέν (on the one hand) – Byz
omitted by א, (A), C, G_{3}, 17

1 Textual variants in 1 Corinthians 16

1 Corinthians 16:15

οικιαν Στεφανα – 𝔓^{46} א* A B C^{2} Ψ 075 Byz cop
οικιαν Στεφανα και Φορτουνατου – א ^{2} D 104 629 1175 1241 2464 pc b vgst cop^{bo}
οικιαν Στεφανα και Φορτουνατου και Αχαικου – C*^{vid} F G 365 2495 pc vg^{cl} syr^{h}

== See also ==
- Alexandrian text-type
- Biblical inerrancy
- Byzantine text-type
- Caesarean text-type
- Categories of New Testament manuscripts
- Comparison of codices Sinaiticus and Vaticanus
- List of New Testament verses not included in modern English translations
- Textual variants in the New Testament
- Western text-type
