= Uncial 0189 =

- New Testament manuscript
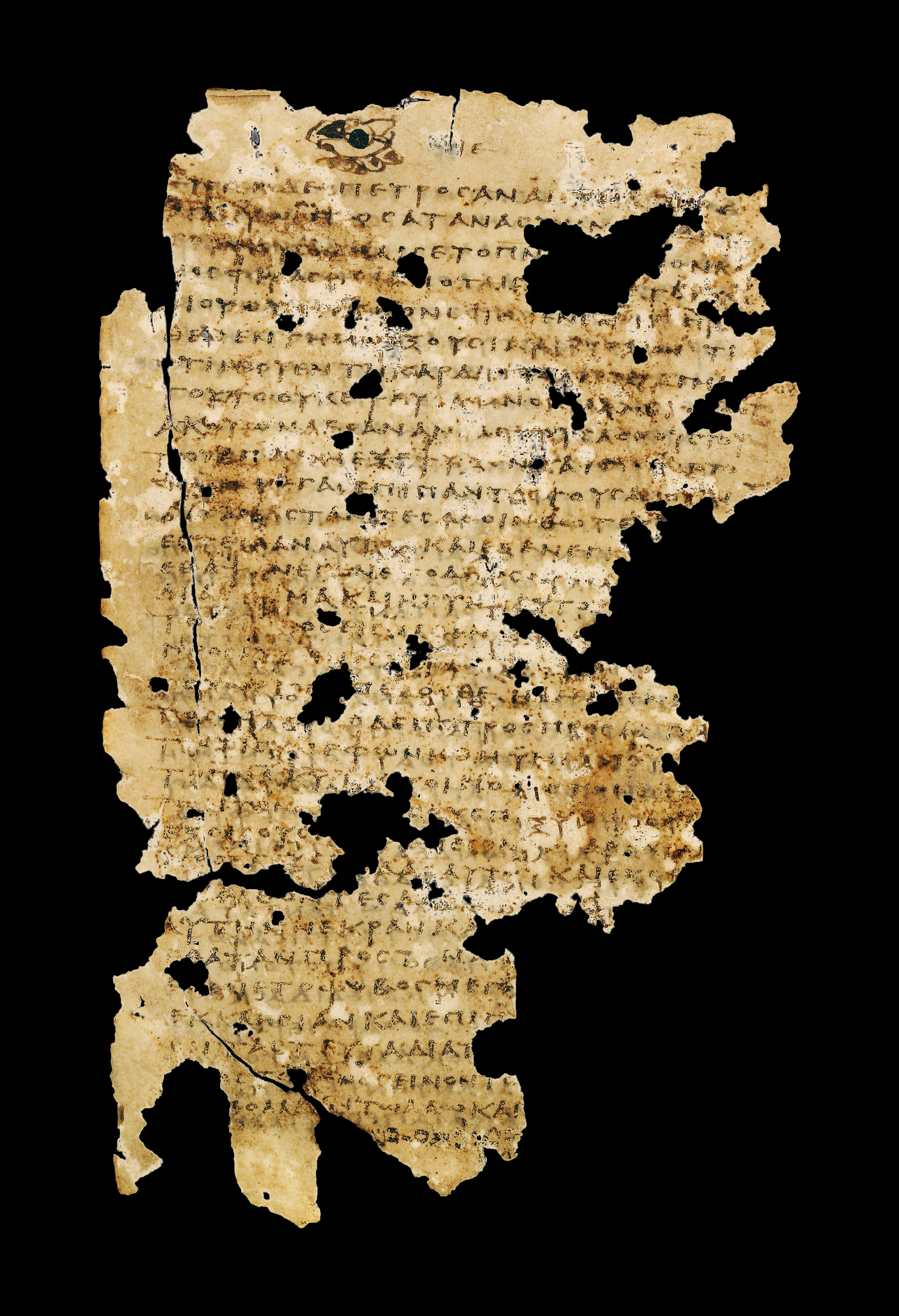
- Recto Acts 5, 3–11
- Name: Majuscule GA0189
- Text: Acts 5:3-21
- Date: c. ~200
- Script: Greek
- Found: unknown
- Now at: Berlin State Museums
- Cite: Salonius, A. H. (1 January 1927). "Die griechischen Handschriftenfragmente des Neuen Testaments in den Staatlichen Museen zu Berlin". ZNW (in German). 26: 116–119. doi:10.1515/zntw.1927.26.1.97. ISSN 1613-009X.
- Size: 1 vellum leaf; 18 x 11.5 cm; 32 lines/page
- Type: Alexandrian
- Category: I
- Hand: reformed documentary
- Note: page numbers suggest Acts only codex

Uncial 0189 (in the Gregory-Aland numbering), is the oldest parchment manuscript of the New Testament.

== Description ==
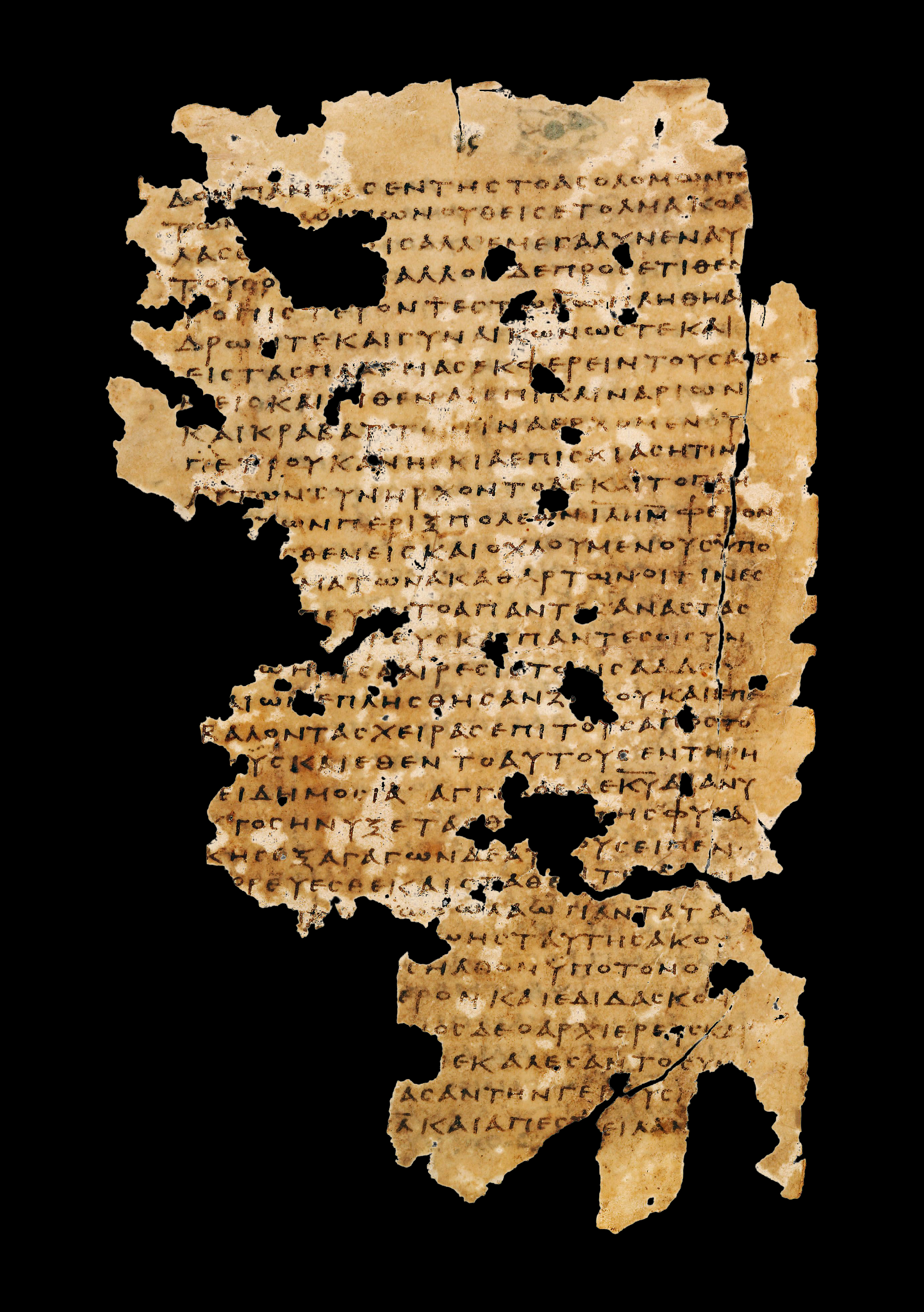
Verso Acts 5, 12–21

It consists of a single vellum leaf of a late second or early third century Greek codex, containing only a small part of the Acts of the Apostles.

The history of Uncial 0189 is unknown prior to its current possession by the Staatliche Museen zu Berlin (inventoried as Papyrus Berlin 11765 in the Berlin Papyrus Collection).

Uncial 0189 measures 11.5 cm by 18 cm from a page of 32 lines. The scribe wrote in a reformed documentary hand.

Uncial 0189 has evidence of the following nomina sacra: Α̅Ν̅Ο̅Σ̅ Π̅Ν̅Α̅ Κ̅Υ̅ Κ̅Ω̅ Ι̅Λ̅Η̅Μ̅ Θ̅Ω̅ Ι̅Σ̅Η̅Λ̅.

The Alands describe the text-type as "at least normal". Uncial 0189 is an important early witness to the Alexandrian text-type, nearly always agreeing with the other witnesses to this type of text. Aland placed it in Category I (because of its date).

Aarne H. Salonius originally dated Uncial 0189 to the 4th Century CE. However this was later redated by C. H. Roberts to the 2nd or 3rd Century CE, which the Alands accepted.

The INTF currently dates Uncial 0189 to the 3rd or 4th century CE.

Kurt Aland included Uncial 0189 in the Critical Apparatus of the 25th edition of Novum Testamentum Graece (1963).

Uncial 0189 is classed as a "consistently cited witness of the first order" in the Novum Testamentum Graece (NA27). NA27 considers it even more highly than other witnesses of this type. It provides an exclamation mark (!) for "papyri and uncial manuscripts of particular significance because of their age."

A transcription of the text of Uncial 0189 was first published by Aarne H. Salonius in Zeitschrift für die neutestamentliche Wissenschaft in 1927.

== Legend ==
New Testament sigla legend

New Testament sigla legend

This is a guide to the sigla (symbols and abbreviations) most frequently used in citations of source material for a Greek New Testament (NT) manuscript. Editors of a scholarly critical text of the NT use each siglum to shrink the space needed for listing witnesses to a particular reading in the critical apparatus. The intended reader, a Bible translator, scholar, orator, or student, needs to know these abbreviations, e.g. for deciding whether to use alternative readings of the critical text or to understand the origin and attestation of a particular passage.

A manuscript may have a Gregory–Aland index number because it is a Greek minuscule (see list). However, if the number has a leading 0, it is a Greek uncial (see list) using the older majuscule script.

Besides these sigla and annotations, scholars often abbreviate other words and phrases after the manner of A Plain Introduction to the Criticism of the New Testament by Scrivener, which began a formalized system of collation, cataloguing, and jargon for NT textual critics in 1861.

General sigla

General sigla

# beginning with 0: uncial
# not beginning with 0: minuscule
^{*} superscript: original reading
^{app} superscript: the critical apparatus reading
^{c} superscript: scribal correction
^{com} superscript: Biblical commentary reading
^{1,2,3...} superscripts: 1st, 2nd, 3rd... scribal corrections
^{v.l.} superscript: varia lectio, i.e. alternative reading
^{mg} superscript: reading in the margin
^{ms} superscript: individual manuscript
^{mss} superscript: multiple manuscripts
^{pt} superscript: partial attestation
^{s} superscript: reading in a supplement to the text
^{txt} superscript: the reading of the text
^{vid} superscript: apparent but uncertain reading
aeth or eth: Ethiopic versions
al: alii: i.e., others
arab: Arabic versions
arm: Armenian versions
Byz: Byzantine text-type in the Catholic letters and superscript:

pt: a part of the Codices Byzantini

cop: Coptic versions

ac or akh: Akhmimic version
ac^{2}: Subakhmimic or Lycopolitanic version
bo: Boharic version
cv: Dialect V
cw: Dialect W
fa or fay or mf: Fayyumic Version
mae: Middle Egyptian or Mesokemic version
pbo: Proto-Bohartic version
sa: Sahidic version

ƒ: individually-numbered Greek manuscript family - superscripts:

1: Family 1
13: Family 13

geo: Georgian versions
goth: Gothic versions
𝕲: The Greek Old Testament text, i.e. Septuagint (LXX)
𝕳: The Hebrew Old Testament text, i.e. the Masoretic Text
it: Italic/Vetus Latina, lowercase letters for individual Old Latin manuscripts
lat: most Italic and Vulgate
latt: all Italic and Vulgate, Masoretic Text
P or 𝔓: papyrus
𝑙 or ℓ: individually numbered lectionary
Lect: most or all numbered lectionaries
𝔐: Greek Majority text and superscripts:

A: Andreas of Caesarea commentary in Revelation
C: Complutensian tradition
K: the Koine tradition in Revelation

o: omits
parenthesized (): reading or witness with a slight difference
pc: pauci: i.e., few
pm: permulti: i.e., many
rell: all other extant manuscripts
slav: Slavic versions in Old Church Slavonic
syr or sy: Syriac versions and superscripts:

c or cur: Curetonian Gospels
s: Sinaitic Palimpsest
h: Harclean Syriac
hmg: Harclean Syriac, margin
pal: Palestinian Syriac
p: the Peshitta

vg: Latin Vulgate manuscripts (capital letters)

A: Codex Amiatinus
F: Codex Fuldensis
gig: Codex Gigas (Old Latin in Acts and Revelation)
Σ or S: Codex Sangallensis 1395

Major manuscripts

Greek Uncials (siglum or leading 0)

א: Codex Sinaiticus (01)
A: Codex Alexandrinus (02)
B: Codex Vaticanus (03)
C: Codex Ephraemi Rescriptus (04)
D^{ea}: Codex Bezae (05)
D^{p}: Codex Claromontanus (06)
E: Codex Basilensis A. N. III. 12 (07)
E^{a}: Codex Laudianus (08)
F^{e}: Codex Boreelianus (09)
F^{p}: Codex Augiensis (010)
G^{e}: Codex Seidelianus I (011)
G^{p}: Codex Boernerianus (012)
H^{e}: Codex Seidelianus II (013)
H^{a}: Codex Mutinensis (014)
H^{p}: Codex Coislinianus (015)
I: Codex Freerianus (016)
K^{e}: Codex Cyprius (017)
K^{ap}: Codex Mosquensis I (018)
L^{e}: Codex Regius (New Testament) (019)
L^{ap}: Codex Angelicus (020)
M: Codex Campianus (021)
N: Codex Petropolitanus Purpureus (022)
O: Sinope Gospels (023)
P^{e}: Codex Guelferbytanus A (024)
P^{apr}: Codex Porphyrianus (025)
Q: Codex Guelferbytanus B (026)
R: Codex Nitriensis (027)
S: Codex Vaticanus 354 (028)
T: Codex Borgianus (029)
U: Codex Nanianus (030)
V: Codex Mosquensis II (031)
W: Codex Washingtonianus (032)
X: Codex Monacensis (X 033) (033)
Y: Codex Macedoniensis (034)
Z: Codex Dublinensis (035)
Γ: Codex Tischendorfianus IV (036)
Δ: Codex Sangallensis 48 (037)
Θ: Codex Koridethi (038)
Λ: Codex Tischendorfianus III (039)
Ξ: Codex Zacynthius (040)
Π: Codex Petropolitanus (New Testament) (041)
Σ: Codex Purpureus Rossanensis (042)
Φ: Codex Beratinus (043)
Ψ: Codex Athous Lavrensis (044)
Ω: Codex Athous Dionysiou (045)
0189: Uncial 0189
See list of other Uncials

Vetus Latina (Old Latin) Uncials (lower-case letters)

it or OL or 𝕷: with superscripts:

^{a}: Codex Vercellensis
^{b}: Codex Veronensis
^{d}: Codex Bezae (Gospels, Acts, 3 Jn)
^{d}: Codex Claromontanus (Paul)
^{e}: Codex Palatinus
^{f}: Codex Brixianus
ff^{1}: Codex Corbeiensis I
ff^{2}: Codex Corbeiensis II
^{g}: Codex Boernerianus
g^{1}: Codex Sangermanensis I
gig: Codex Gigas (Acts and Revelation)
^{h}: Codex Floriacensis
^{j}: Codex Purpureus Sarzanensis
^{k}: Codex Bobiensis
^{l}: Codex Rehdigeranus
r^{1}: Codex Usserianus Primus
^{s}: Codex Bobiensis
^{z}: Harley MS 1772
Numerical and others: See Beuron numbers

Other manuscripts, sources, and printed texts

Other important manuscripts and sources

Lectionaries: See List
ℓ 185: Lectionary 185
ℓ 249: Lectionary 249
Papyri: See List
𝔓^{45}: Papyrus 45 (P. Chester Beatty I)
𝔓^{66}: Papyrus 66
Greek Miniscules: See List (no leading 0)
33: Minuscule 33
2344: Minuscule 2344
The Diatessaron gospel harmony
vg: Printed Latin Vulgate (lowercase superscripts)
cl: Editio Clementina
s: Editio Sixtina
st: Vulgata Stuttgartiensis 2007
ww: Wordsworth/White Vulgate
Church Fathers are cited when relevant
Ju: Justin Martyr
Or: Origen
Dion: Dionysius of Alexandria
Tert: Tertullian

Printed New Testaments: critical and eclectic texts

Latin and Greek Majority texts
E: Erasmus, Novum Instrumentum omne (1516)
ς: The Textus Receptus (so-called) of Robert Estienne (1550)
Beza's Greek and Latin New Testament (1565 to 1611)
M: John Mill, Novum Testamentum Graecum, etc. (1707)
Bengel, Novum Testamentum Graecum (1734)
Wettstein, Novum Testamentum Graecum, etc. (1751)
Ma: Matthaei, Novum Testamentum Graecum, etc. (1803)
Griesbach, Novum Testamentum Graece, etc. (1809 to 1823)
L: Lloyd, Novum Testamentum Graecum (1828, 1836)
Ln: Lachmann, Novum Testamentum Graece et Latine (Greek and Latin, 1842, 1850)
Scr: Scrivener's Greek New Testaments (1877 to 1894)
𝔚: Wordsworth-White, Nouum Testamentum Domini nostri Jesu Christi latine (Latin, 1889)
vS: von Soden, Die Schriften des neuen Testaments, etc. (1902 to 1910)
Farstad and Hodges, The Greek New Testament According to the Majority Text with Apparatus (1982)
Modern Greek NTs with substantially Alexandrian texts
𝔗 or T8th: Tischendorf, Editio Octava Critica Maior (1864 to 1894)
WH: Westcott and Hort, The New Testament in the Original Greek (1881)
Weiss, Das Neue Testament (1894)
NA: Novum Testamentum Graece, Nestle–Aland, NA28 is latest (1898-)
UBS: United Bible Societies, Greek New Testament, UBS5 is latest (1966-)
ECM: Editio Critica Maior, updates to Tischendorf's 8th edition (1997-) (in progress)

== Textual variants ==
Acts 5:8:
Omit τοσουτου: 0189.
Include τοσουτου: P^{8} P^{57} P^{74} 01 02 025 03 044 05 08 18 33 323 614 630 945 1175 1241 1505 1739 424 NA28.

Acts 5:12:
τε: 0189 03.
δε: 𝔓^{45} P^{74} 01 02 05 08 025 044 18 33 323 424 614 630 945 1175 1241 1505 1739 NA28.

εγινετο: 𝔓^{45} P^{74} 01 025 03^{(c2)} 08 044 424 630 1175 1241 1505 1739 NA28.
εγεινοντο: 0189.
εγεινετο: 02 03* 05
εγενετο: 18 33 323 614 945.

παντες: 02 0189 03 08.
απαντες: 𝔓^{45} P^{74} 01 05 025 044 18 33 323 424 614 630 945 1175 1241 1505 1739 NA28.

Acts 5:13:
ουθεις: 03 0189.
ουδεις: 𝔓^{45} P^{74} 01 (ουδις) 02 05 08 025 044 18 33 323 424 614 630 945 1175 1241 1505 1739 NA28.

Acts 5:16:
συνηρχοντο: 0189 614.
συνηρχετο: 𝔓^{45} P^{74} 01 02 03 08 025 044 05 18 33 323 424 630 945 1175 1241 1505 1739 NA28.

Acts 5:19:
ηνοιξε(ν): 0189 (ηνυξε) 03 08 025 044 18 33 323 424 614 945 1241 1505 1739.
ανοιξας: 𝔓^{45} P^{74} 01 02 1175 NA28.
ανοιξε: 630.
Omit: 05.

δε: 0189 03 044.
τε: 𝔓^{45} P^{74} 01 02 025 05 18 33 323 424 614 630 945 1175 1241 1505 1739 NA28.
Omit: 08.

== See also ==
Other early uncials

- Uncial 0162
- Uncial 0171
- Uncial 0220

Sortable lists

- List of New Testament minuscules
- List of New Testament papyri
- List of New Testament uncials

Related articles

- Textual criticism
