= Western non-interpolations =

Term in Biblical studies

Westcott and Hort's chapter on Western non-interpolations in Introduction and Appendix (1882)

Western non-interpolations is a term coined by F. J. A. Hort for certain phrases that are absent in the Western text-type of New Testament manuscripts, but present in one of the two major other text-types. The Alexandrian text-type is generally terse or concise; the Western text-type is larger and paraphrased at places (using more words to convey a similar meaning); the Byzantine text-type is a combination of those two. Nevertheless, the Western text is in certain places shorter than the Alexandrian text. All these shorter readings Hort named Western non-interpolations. Because New Testament scholars have generally preferred the shorter reading – lectio brevior – of textual variants since the 19th century, B. F. Westcott and F. J. A. Hort concluded that these shorter readings in Western manuscripts represented the authentic original Biblical text. When they printed The New Testament in the Original Greek (1882), in almost all cases, it followed the Alexandrian text (which critical scholars agree is the most reliable text-type) with the few exceptions that use these Western non-interpolations instead. According to Westcott and Hort, on some rare occasions Western textual witnesses have preserved the original text, against all other witnesses.

== Alleged Western non-interpolations ==
Nine probable non-interpolations

Westcott and Hort concluded that the shorter Western reading of these nine passages (eight in the Gospel of Luke, one in the Gospel of Matthew) were probably in the original text of the New Testament:

- Matthew 27:49 – ἄλλος δὲ λαβὼν λόγχην ἔνυξεν αὐτοῦ τὴν πλευράν, καὶ ἐξῆλθεν ὕδωρ καὶ αἷμα (the other took a spear and pierced His side, and immediately came out water and blood), this reading is found in א, B, C, L, U, Γ, 1010, 1293, syr^{pal}, eth^{mss}, and Irish Vulgate manuscripts; but is omitted by other texts, including A, D, E, F, G, H, K, M, S, W, Δ, Θ, Σ, 090, Byz, it, vg, syr^{cur}, cop^{sa}, cop^{bo}, arm, geo); it was omitted also in late witness of the Alexandrian text-type in Minuscule 892
- Luke 22:19b-20 – τὸ ὑπὲρ ὑμῶν διδόμενον... τὸ ὑπὲρ ὑμῶν ἐκχυννόμενον (which is given for you... which is shed for you), omitted by D, a, (b, e have a different word order) d, ff^{2}, i, l (syr^{cur} omits only verse 20)
- Luke 24:3 – τοῦ κυρίου Ἰησοῦ (of the Lord Jesus), omitted by D, a, b, d, e, ff^{2}, l, r^{1}, (579, 1071, 1241, syr^{cur} have του Ιησου but omit κυριου)
- Luke 24:6 – οὐκ ἔστιν ὧδε, ἀλλ(ὰ) ἠγέρθη (He is not here, but is risen!), omitted by D, a, b, d, e, ff^{2}, l, r^{1}, arm^{mss}, geo^{B}
- Luke 24:12 – entire verse omitted by D, a, b, d, e, l, r^{1}
- Luke 24:36 – καὶ λέγει αὐτοῖς εἰρήνη ὑμῖν (and said to them: Peace to you), omitted by D, a, b, d, e, ff^{2}, l, r^{1}
- Luke 24:40 – καὶ τοῦτο εἰπὼν ἔδειξεν αὐτοῖς τὰς χεῖρας καὶ τοὺς πόδας (and when He said this, He showed them His hands and His feet), omitted by D, a, b, d, e, ff^{2}, l, r^{1}, syr^{sin}, syr^{cur}
- Luke 24:51 – καὶ ἀνεφέρετο εἰς τὸν οὐρανόν (and carried up into heaven), omitted by א*, D, a, b, d, e, ff^{2}, l, (hiat r^{1}), sin (syr^{cur}) geo^{1}
- Luke 24:52 – προσκυνήσαντες αὐτὸν (worshiped Him), omitted by D, a, b, d, e, ff^{2}, l (hiat r^{1}), sin (syr^{cur}), geo^{2}

Twelve possible but improbable non-interpolations

Westcott and Hort concluded that the shorter Western reading of these twelve passages were possibly in the original text of the New Testament, but it is more likely that they emerged later as a shortening of the original (longer) text:

- Matt. 9:34 – οἱ δὲ Φαρισαῖοι ἔλεγον ἐν τᾡ ἂρχωντι τῶν δαιμονίων ἐκβάλλει τὰ δαιμόνια (But the Pharisees said, "He casts out demons by the ruler of the demons"), omitted by D, a, d, k, sin, Hilary (hiat e syr^{cur})
- Matt. 21:44 – entire verse omitted by 𝔓^{104}, D, 33, a, b, d, e, ff^{1}, ff^{2}, r^{1}, syr^{sin}, Irenaeus (lat), Origen
- Mark 2:22
- Mark 14:39 – τὸν αὐτὸν λόγον εἰπών (spoke the same words), omitted by D, a, b, c, d, ff^{2}, k, (syr^{cur})
- Luke 5:39 – entire verse omitted by D, a, b, c, d, e, ff^{2}, l, r^{1} (syr^{sin} syr^{cur})
- Luke 10:41–42 – instead μεριμνας και θορυβαζη περι πολλα, ολιγων (ενος) δε εστιν χρεια Μαριαμ γαρ (you are worried and troubled about many things, but not much (one thing) is needed) has only θορυβαζη (worried) with (D has Μαριαμ) (a, b, d, e, ff^{2}, i, l, r^{1}, syr^{sin}, Ambrose omit θορυβαζη)
- Luke 12:19
- Luke 12:21 – entire verse omitted by D, a, b, d
- Luke 12:39
- Luke 22:62 – entire verse omitted by (0171 does not appear to leave space) a, b, e, ff^{2}, i, l, r^{1}
- John 3:32
- John 4:9 – ου γαρ συγχρωνται Ιουδαιοι Σαμαριταις (Jews have no dealings with Samaritans), omitted by א*, D, a, b, d, e, j, cop^{fay}

Six improbable non-interpolations

Westcott and Hort concluded that, although these six passages are shorter in the Western text-type, the longer versions were very likely in the original text of the New Testament:

- Matt. 6:15
- Matt. 6:25
- Matt. 13:33
- Matt. 23:26
- Mark 10:2 – προσελθοντες Φαρισαιοι (the Pharisees came), or προσελθοντες οι Φαρισαιοι (word order varies), omitted by D, a, b, d, k, r^{1}, syr^{sin} (syr^{cur})
- Luke 24:9 – απο του μνημειου (from the tomb), omitted by D, a, b, c, d, e, ff^{2}, l, r^{1}, arm, geo

Other possible non-interpolations

- Matt. 6:15 – τὰ παραπτώματα αὐτῶν (their trespasses), omitted by א D 1-118-205-209-1582, 22, 892*, a, aur, c, ff^{1}, g^{1}, syr^{h}
- Matt. 13:33 – ἐλάλησεν αὐτοῖς omitted by D, d, (k), sin, syr^{cur}
- Rom. 6:16 – εις θανατον (for death) omitted by D, 1739*, d, r, am, pesh, sa, arm^{mss}, Ambrosiaster
- Matt. 23:26 – καὶ τῆς παροψίδος (and dish), found in: B, C, L, W, 33, Byz, cop; but omitted by D, Q, 1-118-209-1582, 700, a, d, e, ff^{1}, r^{1}, sin, geo, Irenaeus^{lat}, Clement (hiat, b, syr^{cur})
- Rom. 10:21 – και αντιλεγοντα (and contrary), omitted by F, G, g, Ambrosiaster, Hilary
- Rom. 16:20 – η χαρις του κυριου ημων Ιησου (Χριστου) μεθ υμων omitted (The grace of our Lord Jesus (Christ) with you), by D*^{vid}, F, G, d, f, g, m, bodl Ambrosiaster Pelagius^{ms}
- Rom. 16:25-27 – verses omitted by F, G, 629, d**?, g, goth?, Jerome^{mss}
- 1 Cor. 15:3 – ο και παρελαβον (I received), omitted by b, Ambrosiaster, Irenaeus^{lat}, Tertullian?
- 1 Cor. 15:15 – ειπερ αρα νεκροι ουκ εγειρονται (if in fact the dead do not rise), omitted by D, a, b, r, bam, ful**, harl*, kar, mon, reg, val*, pesh, Ambrosiaster, Irenaeus (lat), Tertullian?
- 2 Cor. 10:12-13 – ου συνιασιν. ημεις δε omitted (are not wise. We, however), by D*, F, G, a, b, d, f, (429?) Ambrosiaster
- 1 Tim. 5:19 – εκτος ει μη επι δυο η τριων μαρτυρων (except from two or three witnesses), omitted by b, Ambrosiaster, Pelagius, Cyprian

== Influence on the New Testament editions ==
The "Western non-interpolations" were not included in the main text of Westcott-Hort edition (1881), but were instead moved to the footnotes. The editions of Nestle and Nestle-Aland did the same. In 1968, "the editorial committee (or more precisely its majority) decided to abandon the theories of Westcott-Hort and the Western non-interpolations." Since 1968 all except Matthew 27:49 are included in the main text, following the text of Luke in 𝔓^{75}, but marked with brackets.

Ehrman (1996) claimed that Westcott and Hort's observations still largely held merit, although he suggested that a better term for the alleged longer readings would be "non-Western interpolations". He made a case that most (but not all) of the longer readings in non-Western witnesses had an anti-docetic character. This might be the reason why they were deleted by docetic Christians in Western manuscripts, but more likely, why they were added to non-Western texts by (proto-orthodox) anti-docetic Christians at a very early stage (before the end of the 2nd century). Whereas scholars such as Aland and Fitzmyer have maintained that new findings such as 𝔓^{75} have refuted Hort's hypothesis, Ehrman concluded they are in line with what Hort expected, and don't undermine his argument.

== See also ==
- Textual variants in the New Testament
- Conflation of readings
