= Old Syriac =

The term Old Syriac may refer to:

- Old Syriac language - an early stage of the Syriac language
- Old Syriac alphabet - an early stage of the Syriac alphabet
- Old Syriac Gospels - the Old Syriac version of the New Testament, that predates the standard Peshitta version, represented by two manuscripts:
  - the Curetonian Gospels
  - the Sinaitic Palimpsest

== See also ==
- Syriac (disambiguation)
