= Lectionary 12 =

Lectionary ℓ 12
- New Testament manuscript
- Text: Gospels
- Date: 13th-century
- Script: Greek
- Now at: Bibliothèque nationale de France
- Size: 30.5 cm by 23 cm

Lectionary 12, designated by siglum ℓ 12 (in the Gregory-Aland numbering). It is a Greek manuscript of the New Testament, on vellum leaves. Palaeographically it has been assigned to the 13th-century.

== Description ==
The codex contains Lessons from the Gospels of John, Matthew, Luke lectionary (Evangelistarium) with some lacunae. It is written in Greek minuscule letters, on 366 parchment leaves (30.5 cm by 23 cm), 2 columns per page, 24 lines per page. It contains musical notes.

== Text ==
Verse Matthew 12:47 is omitted as in codices Codex Sinaiticus, Vaticanus, Codex Regius, 1009, ff^{1}, k, syr^{c}, syr^{s}, cop^{sa}. The omission is typical for the Alexandrian manuscripts.

In Matthew 13:13 it reads ινα βλεποντες μη βλεπωσιν και ακουοντες μη ακουωσιν και μη συνωσι μηποτε επιστρεψωσιν for οτι βλεποντες ου βλεπουσιν και ακουοντες ουκ ακουουσιν ουδε συνιουσιν (Β C Κ L W Δ Π); the reading of the codex is supported by ℓ 70 ℓ 80 ℓ 299 ℓ 850 ℓ 1084; some manuscripts read ινα βλεποντες μη βλεπωσιν και ακουοντες μη ακουωσιν και μη συνιωσιν μηποτε επιστρεψωσιν — Θ, f^{1}, f^{13}, Lect.

== History ==
The manuscript is dated by the INTF to the 13th-century.

It was added to the list of the New Testament manuscripts by Wettstein.

It was slightly examined by Wettstein, Scholz, and Paulin Martin. C. R. Gregory saw it in 1885.

The manuscript is cited in the critical editions of the Greek New Testament (UBS3).

The codex is located now in the Bibliothèque nationale de France (Gr. 310) in Paris.

== See also ==
- List of New Testament lectionaries
- Biblical manuscript
- Textual criticism

== Bibliography ==
- Jean-Pierre-Paul Martin, Description technique des manuscrits grecs relatifs au N. T., conservés dans les bibliothèques des Paris (Paris 1883), p. 141.
