= Uncial 091 =

- New Testament manuscript
- Text: John 6 †
- Date: 6th-century
- Script: Greek
- Now at: Russian National Library
- Size: 32 x 28 cm
- Type: Alexandrian text-type
- Category: II

Uncial 091 in the Gregory-Aland numbering), ε 30 (Soden), is a Greek uncial manuscript of the New Testament, dated paleographically to the 6th-century.

== Description ==
The codex contains a small parts of the Gospel of John 6:13 - 14:22-24, on one parchment leaf (32 cm by 28 cm). The text is written in two columns per page, 23 lines per page, in large uncial letters. Letter iota is written with diaeresis.

The Greek text of this codex has been called a representative of the Alexandrian text-type with some alien readings. Aland placed it in Category II.

In John 6:23 the reading ευχαριστησαντος του κυριου (the Lord had given thanks) is omitted, as in codices D, a, d, e, syr^{c}, syr^{s}, arm, geo^{1}.

In John 6:38 it has the Western reading εκ rather than the Alexandrian reading απο.

It does not have the Western reading πατρος following πεμψαντοσ με (father who sent me) in either 6:38 or 6:39.

At the end of John 6:40 it skips over και αναστησω αυτον εγω [εν] τη εσχατη ημερα (and I will resurrect him [on] the last day).

Currently it is dated by the INTF to the 6th-century.

The codex now is located at the Russian National Library (Gr. 279) in Saint Petersburg.

== See also ==
- List of New Testament uncials
- Textual criticism
