= Lectionary 20 =

Greek manuscript of the New Testament

Lectionary ℓ 20
- New Testament manuscript
- Text: Evangelistarion
- Date: 1047
- Script: Greek
- Now at: Bodleian Library
- Size: 29.5 cm by 24 cm
- Note: neumes

Lectionary 20, designated by siglum ℓ 20 (in the Gregory-Aland numbering), is a Greek manuscript of the New Testament, on vellum leaves. It is dated by a colophon to the year 1047.

== Description ==
The codex contains lessons from the Gospels of John, Matthew, Luke lectionary (Evangelistarium), with lacunae. The text is written in Greek minuscule letters, on 177 parchment leaves (29.5 cm by 24 cm), 2 columns per page, 22 lines per page. It is ornamented manuscript, it contains red musical notes – neumes.

In Matthew 4:23 it contains textual variant ἐν ὅλη τῇ Γαλιλαίᾳ (in whole Galilee) along with Codex Vaticanus, Codex Bobiensis, syr^{c} and cop^{sa}.

== History ==
The codex was written by Onesimus, in April 1047. In 1633 it was purchased by William Laud, and became part of his collection. It was known as Laudianus 4.

It was added to the list of the New Testament manuscripts by Johann Jakob Wettstein. It was slightly examined by John Mill (as Laud. 4) and Griesbach.

Kirsopp and Silva Lake published its facsimile.

The manuscript is sporadically cited in the critical editions of the Greek New Testament (UBS3).

Currently the codex is located in the Bodleian Library (Laud. Gr. 34) in Oxford.

== See also ==
- List of New Testament lectionaries
- Biblical manuscript
- Textual criticism

== Bibliography ==
- Gregory, Caspar René (1900). Textkritik des Neuen Testaments. Vol. 1. Leipzig: J.C. Hinrichs. p. 389.
