= Interpolation (manuscripts) =

Addition of non authorial text

An interpolation, in relation to literature and especially ancient manuscripts, is an entry or passage in a text that was not written by the original author. As there are often several generations of copies between an extant copy of an ancient text and the original, each handwritten by different scribes, there is a natural tendency for extraneous material to be inserted into such documents over time.

== Overview ==
Interpolations originally may be inserted as an authentic explanatory note (for example, [sic]), but may also be included for fraudulent purposes. The forged passages and works attributed to the Pseudo-Isidore are an example of the latter. Similarly, the letters of Ignatius of Antioch were interpolated by Apollinarian heretics, three centuries after the originals were written. Charters and legal texts are also subject to forgery of this kind. In the 13th century, a medieval romance, the Prose Tristan, inserted another prose romance, the Vulgate Cycle's Queste del Saint Graal, in its entirety in order to reinterpret the Quest for the Holy Grail through the optics of the Tristan story. (Note: On the Medieval technique of manuscript interpolation and the Prose Tristan, see Emmanuèle Baumgartner, "La préparation à la Queste del Saint Graal dans le Tristan en prose" in Norris Lacy, ed. Conjunctures (Amsterdam: Rodopi, 1994), pp. 1-14, Fanni Bogdanow, "L'Invention du texte, intertextualité et le problème de la transmission et de la classification de manuscrits" Romania 111 (190): 121-40 and Janina P. Traxler, "The Use and Abuse of the Grail Quest" Tristania 15 (1994): 23-31. Gaston Paris, in 1897, also noted the interpolation of a verse romance on Brunor in Prose Tristan.)

However, most interpolations result from the errors and inaccuracies which tend to arise during hand-copying, especially over long periods of time. For example, if a scribe made an error when copying a text and omitted some lines, he would have tended to include the omitted material in the margin. However, margin notes made by readers are present in almost all manuscripts. Therefore, a different scribe seeking to produce a copy of the manuscript perhaps many years later could find it very difficult to determine whether a margin note was an omission made by the previous scribe (which should be included in the text) or simply a note made by a reader (which should be ignored or kept in the margin).

Conscientious scribes tended to copy everything which appeared in a manuscript, but in all cases scribes needed to exercise personal judgement. Explanatory notes would tend to find their way into the body of a text as a natural result of this subjective process.

Modern scholars have developed techniques for recognizing interpolation, which are often apparent to modern observers, but would have been less so for medieval copyists.

== Examples ==
=== Christianity and Bible ===
The Comma Johanneum, for example, is commonly regarded as interpolation. The specific problem of Christian transmission of Jewish texts outside the Jewish and Christian canons is often described as Christian interpolation.

The comparative study of the Gospels reveals passages present in specials synoptics. These variations are explained by the fact that the gospels have different authors. However, they can be read as an interpolation. In a majority of cases, in response to late theological developments, the editors would have interpolated "clarifications" into the original text.

== See also ==
- Archive
- Deuteronomist
- Elohist
- Exegesis
- Hermeneutics
- Marginalia
- Media preservation
- Priestly source
- Western non-interpolations
