= Zeitschrift für die Alttestamentliche Wissenschaft =

- Discipline: Old Testament
- Language: German and English
- Edited by: Hans-Christoph Schmitt; Ernst-Joachim Waschke

Publication details
- History: 1881-present
- Publisher: Walter de Gruyter (Germany)
- Frequency: Semi-annually

Standard abbreviations
- ISO 4: Z. Alttest. Wiss.

Indexing
- ISSN: 0044-2526 (print); 1613-0103 (web)

Links
- Journal homepage

The Zeitschrift für die Alttestamentliche Wissenschaft (ZATW/ZAW) is an academic German journal established in 1881. It is concerned with theological, linguistic and historical criticism of the Hebrew Bible. Formerly, it represented a strictly Protestant point of view on the Old Testament. At the present time, it is more ecumenical, also representing Catholic and Jewish points of view.

Its first editor was Bernhard Stade. Currently, the journal is edited by Hans-Christoph Schmitt and Ernst-Joachim Waschke and published by Walter de Gruyter. It is edited two times per year in both a printed version and an internet version (ISSN 1613-0103). The majority of articles are written in German, but some of them are written in English and French.

A companion to the ZAW journal is the Zeitschrift für die Neutestamentliche Wissenschaft (ZNW).

There is a further supplementary series to the worked called Beihefte zur Zeitschrift für die alttestamentliche Wissenschaft.

== See also ==
- List of theological journals
