= Conflation of readings =

Intentional changes in the text made by the scribe

Conflation of readings is the term for intentional changes in the text made by the scribe, who used two or more manuscripts with two or more textual variants and created another textual form. The term is used in New Testament textual criticism.

Fenton Hort gave eight examples from Mark (6:33; 8:26; 9:38, 39) and Luke (9:10; 11:54; 12:18; 24:53) in which the Byzantine text-type had combined Alexandrian and Western readings. It was one of the three Hort's arguments that the Byzantine text is the youngest.

Other textual critics gave more examples of conflation (Matthew 27:41, John 18:40, Acts 20:28, and Romans 6:12).

Luke 24:53

"blessing God" (Alexandrian)
"praising God" (Western)
"praising and blessing God" (Byzantine)

Metzger gave as an example Acts 20:28

"the church of God" (Alexandrian)
"the church of the Lord"
"the church of the Lord and God" (Byzantine)

== See also ==
- Textual criticism
- Text types
- Western non-interpolations
