= Text types =

Basic styles of writing

Text types in literature form the basic styles of writing categories are descriptive, narrative, expository, and argumentative

== Narrative text type ==
Based on perception in time. Narration is the telling of a story; the succession of events is given in chronological order.

Purpose

The basic purpose of narrative is to entertain, to gain and hold readers' interest. However narratives can also be written to teach or inform, to change attitudes / social opinions e.g. soap operas and television dramas that are used to raise topical issues. Narratives sequence people/characters in time and place but differ from recounts in that through the sequencing, the stories set up one or more problems, which must eventually find a way to be resolved. The common structure or basic plan of narrative text is known as the "story grammar". Although there are numerous variations of the story grammar, the typical elements are:

- Settings – when and where the story occurs.
- Characters – the most important people or characters in the story.
- Plot – the events of the story, consisting of the initiating event--an action or occurrence that establishes a problem and/or goal--one or more attempts by the main character(s) to achieve the goal or solve the problem, and the Resolutions--the outcome of the attempts to achieve the goal.
- Conflicts/goal – the focal point around which the whole story is organized.
- Theme – the underlying meaning of the story...why the author wrote it...a truth he wants us to learn or realize from the story. Theme isn't specifically stated--it must be discerned.

The graphic representation of these story grammar elements is called a story map. The exact form and complexity of a map depends, of course, upon the unique structure of each narrative and the personal preference of the teacher constructing the map.

Kinds of narrative

There are many kinds of narrative. They can be imaginary, factual or a combination of both. They may include fairy stories, mysteries, science fiction, romances, horror stories, adventure stories, fables, myths and legends, historical narratives, ballads, slice of life, personal experience, or historical.

Features:

- Characters with defined personalities/identities.
- Dialogue often included - tense may change to the present or the future.
- Descriptive language to create images in the reader's mind and enhance the story.

Structure

In a Traditional Narrative the focus of the text is on a series of actions:

Orientation
(Introduction) in which the characters, setting, and time of the story are established. Usually answers who? When? Where? E.g. Mr. Wolf went out hunting in the forest one dark gloomy night.
Complication or problem
The complication usually involves the main character(s) (often mirroring the complications in real life).

Resolution
There needs to be a resolution of the complication. The complication may be resolved for better or worse/happily or unhappily. Sometimes there are a number of complications that have to be resolved. These add and sustain interest and suspense for the reader.

Further more, when there is plan for writing narrative texts, the focus should be on the following characteristics:

- Plot: What is going to happen?
- Setting: Where will the story take place? When will the story take place?
- Characterization: Who are the main characters? What do they look like?
- Structure: How will the story begin? What will be the problem? How is the problem going to be resolved?
- Theme: What is the theme / message the writer is attempting to communicate?

== Expository text type ==
It aims at explanation or procedure, i.e. the cognitive analysis and subsequent syntheses of complex facts. Example: An essay on "Rhetoric: What is it and why do we study it?"

The effectiveness of an expository essay can depend in part on the choice of topic. Topics vary in their suitability for extended investigation, and some may provide insufficient material for a detailed discussion. Topics with sufficient available material can allow for broader analysis and may provide greater scope for developing the subject throughout the essay.

- Trending Topics: Are there any hot issues that deserve some deep discussion? If so, consider educating people on this seemingly new occurrence through the use of a well-written essay.
  - Example: Cultural and Historical Shifts.
- A topic close to your heart: It is easy much easier to defend a thesis if you find yourself passionately thinking about the topic. If you have an advocacy and want to inform others, choose this path and you might be able to sway beliefs!

== Argumentative text type ==
Based on the evaluation and the subsequent subjective judgement in answer to a problem. It refers to the reasons advanced for or against a matter. The writer usually argues with another side to convince the reader to join a certain side.

Comparing the past and the present is a good way of framing an argument, especially if a lot has been written about it.

== Literature ==
A literary text is a piece of writing, such as a book or poem, that has the purpose of telling a story or entertaining, as in a fictional novel. Its primary function as a text is usually aesthetic, but it may also contain political messages or beliefs. American schoolchildren and their parents are taught that literary texts contrast with informational texts that have the purpose of providing information rather than entertainment. Informational texts, such as science briefs and history books, are increasingly receiving emphasis in public school curricula as part of the Common Core State Standards. As a result, many parents have challenged the idea that literary texts are of less pedagogical value than informational one.

== See also ==
- Conflation of Readings
- Text linguistics
