= Papyrus 104 =

- New Testament manuscript
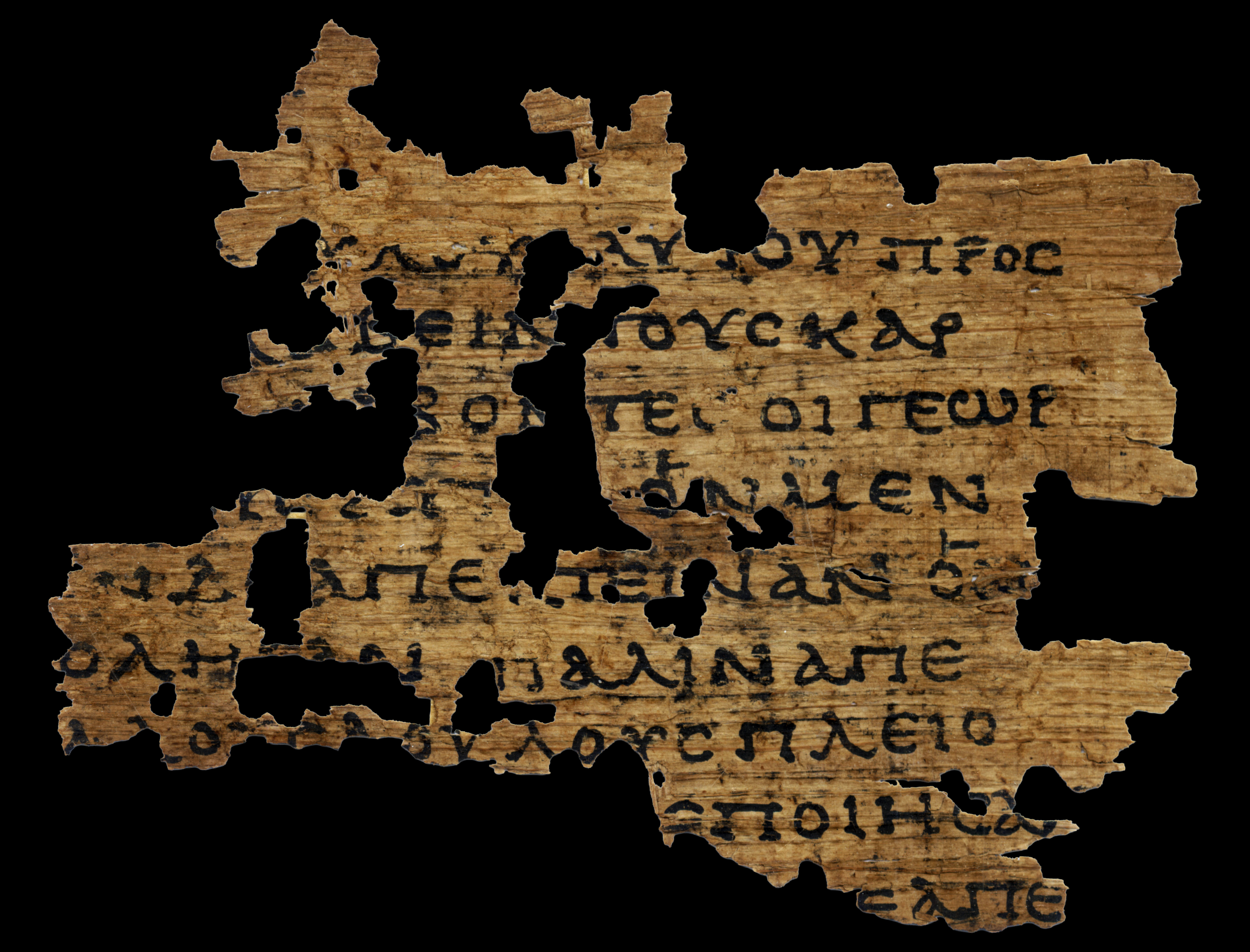
- Recto, Matthew 21:34-37
- Name: P.Oxy.LXIV 4404
- Sign: 𝔓^{104}
- Text: Matthew 21v34-37; 43 and 45(?)
- Date: 100-200
- Script: Greek
- Found: Egypt
- Now at: Papyrology Rooms, Bodleian Art Library, Oxford
- Size: 5.80 x 5.64 cm (2.82 x 2.22 in)
- Type: Western text-type
- Category: I
- Note: Matt. 21:44 omitted

Papyrus 104 (in the Gregory-Aland numbering), designated by the symbol 𝔓^{104}, is a fragment that is part of a leaf from a papyrus codex, it measures 2.82 by 2.22 inches (5.64 by 5.80 cm) at its widest. It is conserved in the Papyrology Rooms at Bodleian Art Library, Oxford, UK. The front (recto) contains lines from the Gospel of Matthew 21:34-37, in Greek, the back (verso) contains tentative traces of lines from verses 43 and 45.

== Description ==
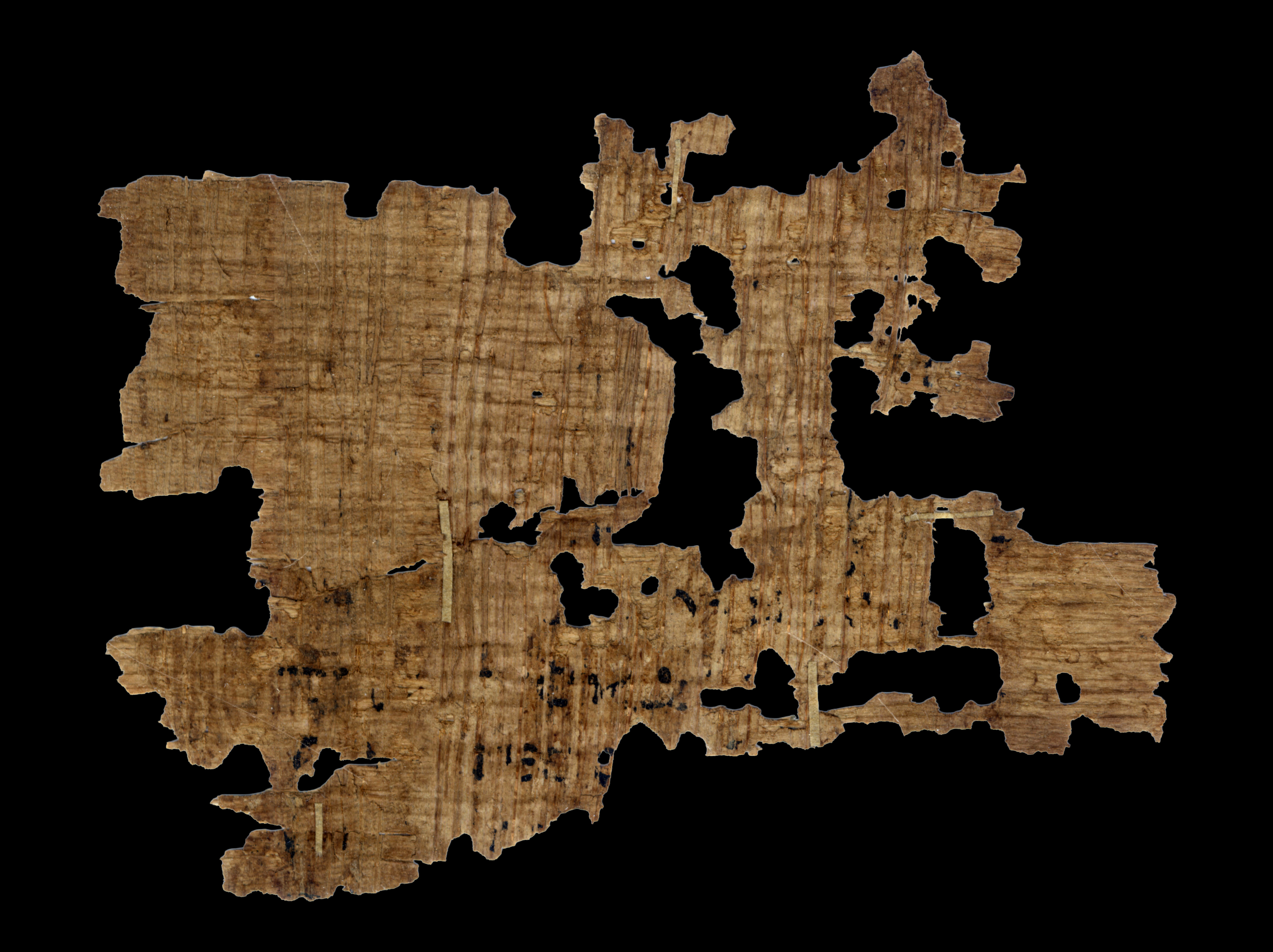
Verso, Matthew 21:43-45

This papyrus ranks among the earliest surviving texts of Matthew. It consists of six verses from the Gospel of Matthew, in a fragmentary condition, and is dated from early to late 2nd century. The text of the manuscript concurs with the NA27/UBS4 (Greek New Testaments) completely, with the exception that it does not include Matthew 21:44. This verse is also omitted in manuscripts: Codex Bezae, Minuscule 33, some Old-Latin manuscripts, Syriac Sinaiticus (syr^{s}), Diatessaron. However, it is included in Sinaiticus, Vaticanus, Ephraemi, Regius, Washingtonianus, and Dublinensis. This verse thus belongs to the so-called Western non-interpolations, making 𝔓^{104} the earliest witness to the interpolated nature of this verse.

== Greek text ==
The papyrus is written on both sides, and the surviving portion also includes part of the top and outer margins of the page. Since the text for the verso is nearly illegible, only the text for the recto is given. The characters that are in bold style are the ones that can be seen in Papyrus 𝔓^{104}.

Gospel of Matthew 21:34-37 (recto)

AΠE-
ΣTEIΛEN TOYΣ ΔOYΛOYΣ AYTOY ΠPOΣ
TOYΣ ΓEΩPΓOYΣ ΛABEIN TOYΣ KAP-
ΠOYΣ AYTOY KAI ΛABONTEΣ OI ΓEΩP-
ΓOI TOYΣ ΔOYΛOYΣ AYTOY ON MEN
EΔEIPAN ON ΔE AΠEKTEINAN ON
ΔE EΛIΘOBOΛHΣAN ΠAΛIN AΠE-
ΣTEIΛEN AΛΛOYΣ ΔOYΛOYΣ ΠΛEIO-
NAΣ TΩN ΠPΩTΩN KAI EΠOIHΣAN
AYTOIΣ ΩΣAYTΩΣ YΣTEPON ΔE AΠE-

ΣTEIΛEN

ape-
steilen tous doulous autou pros
tous geōrgous labein tous kar-
pous autou kai labontes oi geōr-
goi tous doulous autou on men
edeiran on de apekteinan on
de elithobolēsan palin ape-
steilen allous doulous pleio-
nas tōn prōtōn kai epoiēsan
autois ōsautōs usteron de ape-

steilen

...he sent his servants to
the vine-growers to collect the harvest
that was his. And the vine-growers took
his servants; indeed,
they beat one and they killed another,
and another they stoned. Again, he sent
other servants, more than
the first: and they did

unto them likewise. But last of all he sent...

A total of 110 legible letters are visible on the recto side of the fragment, representing 18 out of the 24 letters of the Greek Alphabet; zeta, theta, xi, phi, chi, and psi being missing. "The scribe uses rough breathings, but no other lectional feature or punctuation is found". The hand is 'early', i.e., before c. 250. It is very carefully written, with extensive use of serifs.

== See also ==
- List of New Testament papyri
- Matthew 21
- Oxyrhynchus Papyri
