= Syriac Sinaiticus =

Manuscript of the New Testament in Old Syriac

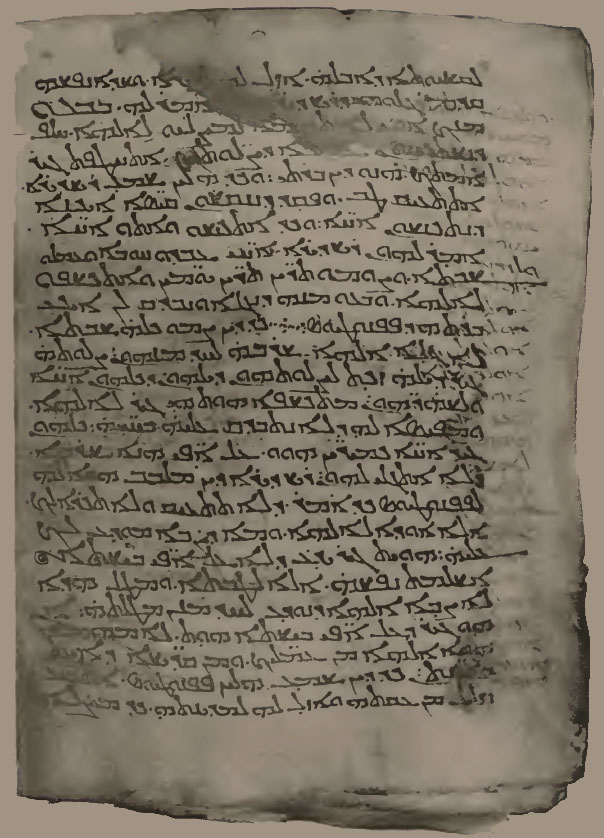
Syriac Sinaiticus, folio 82b, Gospel of Matthew 1:1-17. Superimposed, life of Saint Euphrosyne.

The Syriac Sinaiticus or Codex Sinaiticus Syriacus (syr^{s}), known also as the Sinaitic Palimpsest, is one of the Syriac versions of the Bible. The Syriac Sinaiticus is a late-4th- or early-5th-century manuscript of 179 folios, containing a nearly complete translation of the four canonical Gospels of the New Testament into Syriac, which have been overwritten by a vita (biography) of female saints and martyrs with a date corresponding to AD 697. This palimpsest is the oldest copy of the Gospels in Syriac, one of two surviving manuscripts (the other being the Curetonian Gospels) that are conventionally dated to before the Peshitta, the standard Syriac translation. The Syriac palimpsest [catalogued as Sinai, Syr. 30] was discovered by a Western researcher at Saint Catherine's Monastery on Mount Sinai in 1892.

== Text ==
Both the Syriac Sinaiticus (designated syr^{s}) [Sinai, Syr 30] and the Curetonian Gospels (designated syr^{cur} or syr^{c}) [British Library, Add 14451; Staatsbibliothek, Berlin, Orient Quad 528] known as the Old Syriac version contain similar renderings of the Gospel text; its conformity with the Greek and the Latin has been debated.Additional passages of the Old Syriac version were discovered among the New Finds (1975) of Saint Catherine's Monastery [Sinai, Syr. NF 37, 39].

The Diatessaron, a Harmony of the Four Gospels composed by Tatian in the second century, was being used in the Syrian churches for three centuries, but this was to change. A promulgation by Bishop Rabbula of Edessa between the years A.D. 411 and 435 decreed that the four separate Gospels were to be used in Syriac churches instead. The Old Syriac version of Gospels was the result.

The importance of such early, less-conforming texts is emphasized by the revision of the Peshitta that was made about 508, ordered by bishop Philoxenus of Mabbog. His revision, it is said, skillfully moved the Peshitta nearer to the Greek text; "it is very remarkable that his own frequent Gospel quotations preserved in his writings show that he used an Old Syriac set of the four Gospels".

The Peshitta would evolve and diverge from the Old Syriac Gospels in a number of ways, and became effectively the Syriac "Vulgate." (The Vulgate was originally translated from Greek in the lingua franca of Latin-speaking Christians in Europe and Asia. The Peshitta served a similar purpose for those who spoke the Syriac language.)

== History ==
The palimpsest was identified in the library at Saint Catherine's Monastery in February 1892 by Agnes Smith Lewis, who returned with a team of scholars in 1893 that included J. Rendel Harris, F. C. Burkitt, and R. L. Bensly to photograph and transcribe the work in its entirety.

While there, Lewis also discovered a completely different palimpsest in a different dialect of Syriac unfamiliar to her. This version (and a second copy found by Dr. Harris) was determined to be a lectionary written in Aramaic using Syriac letters. These two lectionaries became known as the Palestinian Syriac version of the Bible, a much later Syriac version of the Bible designated as syr^{pal}.

The German theologian Adalbert Merx devoted much of his later research to the elucidation of the Syriac Sinaiticus, the results being embodied in Die vier kanonischen Evangelien nach dem ältesten bekannten Texte (1897–1905).

The Sinaitic Palimpsest immediately became a central document in tracing the history of the New Testament. The palimpsest's importance lies especially in making the Greek New Testament manuscripts understandable to Aramaic speaking communities during that period.

It is still kept by the Monastery.

New Testament sigla legend

New Testament sigla legend

This is a guide to the sigla (symbols and abbreviations) most frequently used in citations of source material for a Greek New Testament (NT) manuscript. Editors of a scholarly critical text of the NT use each siglum to shrink the space needed for listing witnesses to a particular reading in the critical apparatus. The intended reader, a Bible translator, scholar, orator, or student, needs to know these abbreviations, e.g. for deciding whether to use alternative readings of the critical text or to understand the origin and attestation of a particular passage.

A manuscript may have a Gregory–Aland index number because it is a Greek minuscule (see list). However, if the number has a leading 0, it is a Greek uncial (see list) using the older majuscule script.

Besides these sigla and annotations, scholars often abbreviate other words and phrases after the manner of A Plain Introduction to the Criticism of the New Testament by Scrivener, which began a formalized system of collation, cataloguing, and jargon for NT textual critics in 1861.

General sigla

General sigla

# beginning with 0: uncial
# not beginning with 0: minuscule
^{*} superscript: original reading
^{app} superscript: the critical apparatus reading
^{c} superscript: scribal correction
^{com} superscript: Biblical commentary reading
^{1,2,3...} superscripts: 1st, 2nd, 3rd... scribal corrections
^{v.l.} superscript: varia lectio, i.e. alternative reading
^{mg} superscript: reading in the margin
^{ms} superscript: individual manuscript
^{mss} superscript: multiple manuscripts
^{pt} superscript: partial attestation
^{s} superscript: reading in a supplement to the text
^{txt} superscript: the reading of the text
^{vid} superscript: apparent but uncertain reading
aeth or eth: Ethiopic versions
al: alii: i.e., others
arab: Arabic versions
arm: Armenian versions
Byz: Byzantine text-type in the Catholic letters and superscript:

pt: a part of the Codices Byzantini

cop: Coptic versions

ac or akh: Akhmimic version
ac^{2}: Subakhmimic or Lycopolitanic version
bo: Boharic version
cv: Dialect V
cw: Dialect W
fa or fay or mf: Fayyumic Version
mae: Middle Egyptian or Mesokemic version
pbo: Proto-Bohartic version
sa: Sahidic version

ƒ: individually-numbered Greek manuscript family - superscripts:

1: Family 1
13: Family 13

geo: Georgian versions
goth: Gothic versions
𝕲: The Greek Old Testament text, i.e. Septuagint (LXX)
𝕳: The Hebrew Old Testament text, i.e. the Masoretic Text
it: Italic/Vetus Latina, lowercase letters for individual Old Latin manuscripts
lat: most Italic and Vulgate
latt: all Italic and Vulgate, Masoretic Text
P or 𝔓: papyrus
𝑙 or ℓ: individually numbered lectionary
Lect: most or all numbered lectionaries
𝔐: Greek Majority text and superscripts:

A: Andreas of Caesarea commentary in Revelation
C: Complutensian tradition
K: the Koine tradition in Revelation

o: omits
parenthesized (): reading or witness with a slight difference
pc: pauci: i.e., few
pm: permulti: i.e., many
rell: all other extant manuscripts
slav: Slavic versions in Old Church Slavonic
syr or sy: Syriac versions and superscripts:

c or cur: Curetonian Gospels
s: Sinaitic Palimpsest
h: Harclean Syriac
hmg: Harclean Syriac, margin
pal: Palestinian Syriac
p: the Peshitta

vg: Latin Vulgate manuscripts (capital letters)

A: Codex Amiatinus
F: Codex Fuldensis
gig: Codex Gigas (Old Latin in Acts and Revelation)
Σ or S: Codex Sangallensis 1395

Major manuscripts

Greek Uncials (siglum or leading 0)

א: Codex Sinaiticus (01)
A: Codex Alexandrinus (02)
B: Codex Vaticanus (03)
C: Codex Ephraemi Rescriptus (04)
D^{ea}: Codex Bezae (05)
D^{p}: Codex Claromontanus (06)
E: Codex Basilensis A. N. III. 12 (07)
E^{a}: Codex Laudianus (08)
F^{e}: Codex Boreelianus (09)
F^{p}: Codex Augiensis (010)
G^{e}: Codex Seidelianus I (011)
G^{p}: Codex Boernerianus (012)
H^{e}: Codex Seidelianus II (013)
H^{a}: Codex Mutinensis (014)
H^{p}: Codex Coislinianus (015)
I: Codex Freerianus (016)
K^{e}: Codex Cyprius (017)
K^{ap}: Codex Mosquensis I (018)
L^{e}: Codex Regius (New Testament) (019)
L^{ap}: Codex Angelicus (020)
M: Codex Campianus (021)
N: Codex Petropolitanus Purpureus (022)
O: Sinope Gospels (023)
P^{e}: Codex Guelferbytanus A (024)
P^{apr}: Codex Porphyrianus (025)
Q: Codex Guelferbytanus B (026)
R: Codex Nitriensis (027)
S: Codex Vaticanus 354 (028)
T: Codex Borgianus (029)
U: Codex Nanianus (030)
V: Codex Mosquensis II (031)
W: Codex Washingtonianus (032)
X: Codex Monacensis (X 033) (033)
Y: Codex Macedoniensis (034)
Z: Codex Dublinensis (035)
Γ: Codex Tischendorfianus IV (036)
Δ: Codex Sangallensis 48 (037)
Θ: Codex Koridethi (038)
Λ: Codex Tischendorfianus III (039)
Ξ: Codex Zacynthius (040)
Π: Codex Petropolitanus (New Testament) (041)
Σ: Codex Purpureus Rossanensis (042)
Φ: Codex Beratinus (043)
Ψ: Codex Athous Lavrensis (044)
Ω: Codex Athous Dionysiou (045)
0189: Uncial 0189
See list of other Uncials

Vetus Latina (Old Latin) Uncials (lower-case letters)

it or OL or 𝕷: with superscripts:

^{a}: Codex Vercellensis
^{b}: Codex Veronensis
^{d}: Codex Bezae (Gospels, Acts, 3 Jn)
^{d}: Codex Claromontanus (Paul)
^{e}: Codex Palatinus
^{f}: Codex Brixianus
ff^{1}: Codex Corbeiensis I
ff^{2}: Codex Corbeiensis II
^{g}: Codex Boernerianus
g^{1}: Codex Sangermanensis I
gig: Codex Gigas (Acts and Revelation)
^{h}: Codex Floriacensis
^{j}: Codex Purpureus Sarzanensis
^{k}: Codex Bobiensis
^{l}: Codex Rehdigeranus
r^{1}: Codex Usserianus Primus
^{s}: Codex Bobiensis
^{z}: Harley MS 1772
Numerical and others: See Beuron numbers

Other manuscripts, sources, and printed texts

Other important manuscripts and sources

Lectionaries: See List
ℓ 185: Lectionary 185
ℓ 249: Lectionary 249
Papyri: See List
𝔓^{45}: Papyrus 45 (P. Chester Beatty I)
𝔓^{66}: Papyrus 66
Greek Miniscules: See List (no leading 0)
33: Minuscule 33
2344: Minuscule 2344
The Diatessaron gospel harmony
vg: Printed Latin Vulgate (lowercase superscripts)
cl: Editio Clementina
s: Editio Sixtina
st: Vulgata Stuttgartiensis 2007
ww: Wordsworth/White Vulgate
Church Fathers are cited when relevant
Ju: Justin Martyr
Or: Origen
Dion: Dionysius of Alexandria
Tert: Tertullian

Printed New Testaments: critical and eclectic texts

Latin and Greek Majority texts
E: Erasmus, Novum Instrumentum omne (1516)
ς: The Textus Receptus (so-called) of Robert Estienne (1550)
Beza's Greek and Latin New Testament (1565 to 1611)
M: John Mill, Novum Testamentum Graecum, etc. (1707)
Bengel, Novum Testamentum Graecum (1734)
Wettstein, Novum Testamentum Graecum, etc. (1751)
Ma: Matthaei, Novum Testamentum Graecum, etc. (1803)
Griesbach, Novum Testamentum Graece, etc. (1809 to 1823)
L: Lloyd, Novum Testamentum Graecum (1828, 1836)
Ln: Lachmann, Novum Testamentum Graece et Latine (Greek and Latin, 1842, 1850)
Scr: Scrivener's Greek New Testaments (1877 to 1894)
𝔚: Wordsworth-White, Nouum Testamentum Domini nostri Jesu Christi latine (Latin, 1889)
vS: von Soden, Die Schriften des neuen Testaments, etc. (1902 to 1910)
Farstad and Hodges, The Greek New Testament According to the Majority Text with Apparatus (1982)
Modern Greek NTs with substantially Alexandrian texts
𝔗 or T8th: Tischendorf, Editio Octava Critica Maior (1864 to 1894)
WH: Westcott and Hort, The New Testament in the Original Greek (1881)
Weiss, Das Neue Testament (1894)
NA: Novum Testamentum Graece, Nestle–Aland, NA28 is latest (1898-)
UBS: United Bible Societies, Greek New Testament, UBS5 is latest (1966-)
ECM: Editio Critica Maior, updates to Tischendorf's 8th edition (1997-) (in progress)

== Notable readings ==
Bruce Metzger, a textual critic of the New Testament, noted that the Sinaitic and Curetonian versions are both Western texts while supporting "many typically Alexandrian readings." However, a comparison of the two reveals that Curetonian is more often a Western witness than the Syriac Sinaiticus.

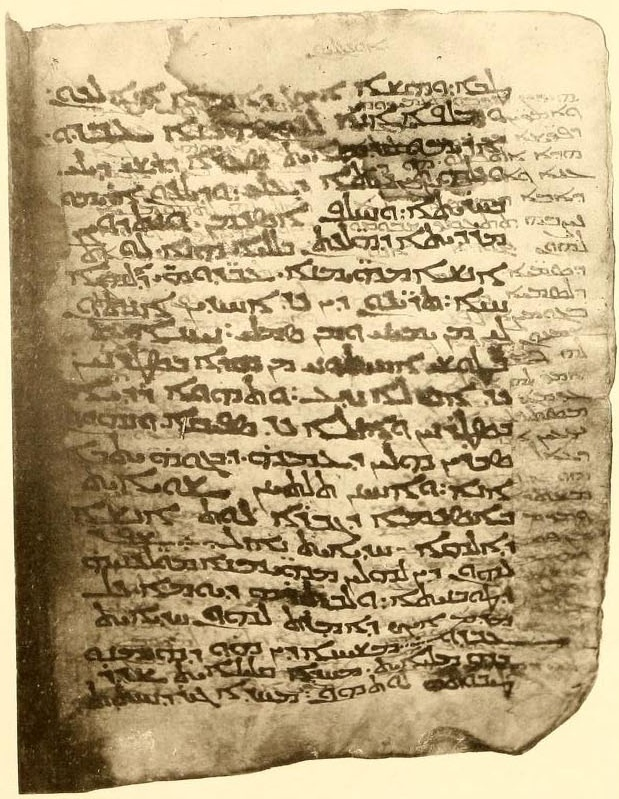
Matthew 15:12–27

The palimpsest lacks the last 12 verses of Mark, Christ's agony (Luke 22:43–44), the Pericope Adulteræ (John 7:53–8:11), and the reconciliation of Pilate with Herod (Luke 23:10–12).

In Matthew 1:16, it contains "Joseph, to whom was betrothed Mary the Virgin, begat Jesus, who is called the Christ"

In Matthew 4:10, it contains a singular reading reflecting the Greek ὕπαγε ὀπίσω σου ('get you behind' or 'get behind you').

Matthew 12:47 is omitted, as in א* B L Γ Minuscule 1009, ℓ 12, ff^{1}, k, syr^{c}, cop^{sa}.

In Matthew 14:12, it reflects πτωμα ('corpse') with א B C D L Θ f^{1} f^{13} 33 565 700 892 1241 1424 e k ℓ 844 ℓ 2211 syr^{c} syr^{p} cop^{bo}

In Matthew 16:12, it reflects της ζυμης ('leaven') with D Θ f^{13} 565 a b ff^{2}

Matthew 21:44 is omitted, as in 𝔓^{104} D 33 it^{a.b.d.e} ff^{1} ff^{2} r^{1} Irenaeus^{lat} Origen, Eusebius

In Matthew 27:9, text reflecting Ιερεμιου ('Jeremiah') is omitted, as in Φ 33 it^{a} it^{b} syr^{p} cop^{bo}

In Matthew 27:16, it reflects Ἰησοῦν τὸν Βαραββᾶν ('Jesus the Barabbas') with Θ f^{1} 700* arm geo^{2}

In Mark 2:26, the phrase when Abiathar was high priest is omitted, as in D, W, 1009, 1546, it^{a.b.d.e.ff^{2}.i.r^{1}.t}

In Mark 10:2, the phrase the Pharisees came is omitted, as in D it^{a.b.d.k.r^{1}} (syr^{cur})

In Mark 10:7, the phrase and be joined to his wife is omitted, as in א B Ψ 892* 2427 ℓ 48 goth

In Luke 4:17, it reflects ἀνοίξας ('opened') with A B L W Ξ 33 579 892 1195 1241 ℓ 547 syr^{h} syr^{pal} cop^{sa, bo}

In Luke 9:35, it reflects ἐκλελεγμένος ('Elect One') with 𝔓^{45} 𝔓^{75} א B L Ξ 892 1241 it^{a.aur.ff^{2}.l} vg^{st} cop^{mss}

In Luke 10:41b–42a, the phrase you are worried and being troubled about many things, but only one thing is needed is omitted, as in it^{a.b.d.e.ff^{2}.i.l.r^{1}} Ambrose

In Luke 23:34, the phrase And Jesus said: Father forgive them, they know not what they do is omitted, agreeing with 𝔓^{75} א^{1} B D* W Θ 0124 1241 a Bezae^{lat} cop^{sa} cop^{bo}.

Luke 24:40 is omitted, as in D it^{a.b.d.e.ff^{2}.l.r^{1}}, syr^{cur}

In Luke 24:52, the phrase after worshiping him is omitted, as in D it^{a.b.d.e.ff^{2}.geo^{2}.l} (syr^{cur})

In Luke 24:53, it reflects εὐλογοῦντες ('blessing') with 𝔓^{75} א B C* L

In John 1:34, it reflects ὁ ἐκλεκτός ('the Elect One') with 𝔓^{5} 𝔓^{106}^{vid} א* it^{b.e.ff^{2*}} syr^{cur}

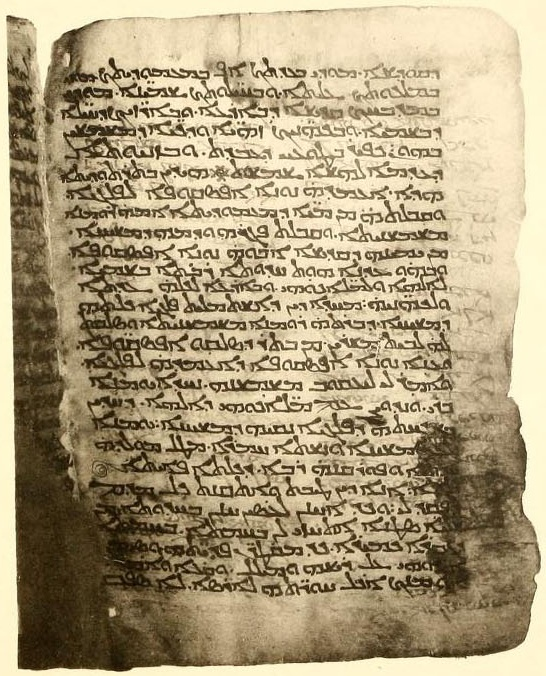
John 5:46–6:11

In John 6:23, the phrase the Lord having given thanks is omitted, as in D 091 it^{a.e} syr^{cur}

In John 6:42, the phrase and his mother is omitted, as in א* W it^{b} syr^{cur}

In John 6:46, it contains a singular reading reflecting the Greek θεον πατερα ('God the Father').

In John 6:47, it reflects ὁ πιστεύων εις θεον ἔχει ζωὴν αἰώνιον ('he who is believing in God has life everlasting') in agreement only with syr^{cur}.

In John 6:51, it reflects του εμου ἄρτου ('my bread') with א it^{a.e.r^{1}}

In John 6:64, the text who they are who are not believing, and is omitted, as in 𝔓^{66*} it^{e} syr^{cur}

In John 7:32, the phrase the chief priests and the Pharisees is omitted, as in 118 it^{b.e}

In John 8:16, text reflecting πατήρ ('father') is omitted, as in א* D 1655* it^{d} syr^{cur}

In John 8:53, the phrase our father is omitted, as in D W it^{a.b.c.d.e.ff^{2}.j.l} cop^{pbo}

In John 9:18, the phrase had been blind and had received sight is omitted, as in 𝔓^{66*} f^{1} 565 it^{mss} cop^{bo}

In John 9:35, it reflects υἱὸν τοῦ ἀνθρώπου ('Son of Man') with 𝔓^{66} 𝔓^{75} א B D W cop^{mss}

In John 11:25, the phrase and the life is omitted, as in 𝔓^{45} it^{l} Diatessaron^{syr} Cyprian

In John 11:39, the phrase the sister of the deceased is omitted, as in Θ it^{aur.b.c.e.ff^{2}.l} ac^{2}

In John 11:51, the phrase of that year is omitted, as in 𝔓^{45} it^{e}

John 12:8 is omitted, as in D it^{d}

In John 13:32, the phrase If God has been glorified in him is omitted, as in 𝔓^{66} א* B C* D L W X 579 it vg^{mss} syr^{h} ac^{2} mf co^{bo^{mss}}

In John 14:1, the phrase And he said to his disciples starts the passage, as in D it^{a.aur.c}

John 14:14 is omitted, as in X Λ* 0141 f^{1} 565 it^{b} vg^{ms} arm

John 16:3 is omitted.

In John 16:28, the phrase I came forth from the Father is omitted, as in D W it^{b.d.ff^{2}} ac^{2} cop^{pbo}

In John 17:14, the phrase just as I am not of the world is omitted, as in 𝔓^{66*} D f^{13} it^{b.c.d.e.r^{1}}

In John 18:5, the phrase the one betraying him is omitted, as in 𝔓^{66*^{vid}}

In John 18:13–24, the verse order is 13, 24, 14–15, 19–23, 16–18

In John 20:1, the text reads from the opening of the tomb with א W f^{1} 22 565 579 it^{d.f.r^{1}} vg^{ms} cop^{bo} cop^{pbo}

John 20:13 contains an interpolation (in bold): Woman, why are you weeping? Who are you seeking? This reading is supported by A* D 579 1424

John 20:26 contains a singular reading (in bold): And after eight days, on the first day of the Sabbath (week?)

In John 21:4, the passage concludes with yet, they knew not as with 𝔓^{66} א L Ψ 33 844 lat

In John 21:13, it reflects ευχαριστησας εδωκεν αὐτοῖς ('upon giving thanks, he gave it to them') as with D it^{f.r^{1}} vg^{mss}

== See also ==
- Aramaic New Testament
- Codex Sinaiticus
- Palestinian Syriac version of the Bible, another Syriac found by Lewis in 1892
- Saint Catherine’s Monastery
