= Palestinian Syriac version of the Bible =

Ancient Aramaic language Bible written in Syriac

The inter-relationship between various significant ancient manuscripts of the Old Testament. LXX denotes the original Septuagint; "B" denotes the Codex Vaticanus

The Palestinian Syriac version, designated by syr^{pal}, is a fragmentary translation of the Bible into Christian Palestinian Aramaic written with the Syriac alphabet. It is one of several Syriac versions of the Bible, but is unique in its use of a Christian Palestinian Aramaic dialect with Jewish influences during the early part of the First Millennium.

A small portion of a Palestinian Syriac was published in Copenhagen in 1789 of what became Codex A. It was originally known as the Jerusalem Syriac version, and it was from a lectionary containing the Gospels using the same structure as Greek lectionaries of the Byzantine Church. It had been found in the Vatican Library in 1758 by two cousins Assemani.

== The manuscripts ==
- Codex A, 196 leaves, Vatican, A.D. 1030, written in "Antioch of the Arabs," perhaps Antioch or Jerash) - The first publication of the Palestinian Syriac was in 1892 by Paul de Lagarde.
- Codex B, 156 leaves, A.D. 1104 - Twin sisters Agnes Smith Lewis and Margaret Dunlop Gibson took part in the discovery of another manuscript after a fortuitous trip to the Saint Catherine's Monastery on Mount Sinai by Lewis in 1892.
- Codex C, 156 leaves, A.D. 1118 - A third one was found by J. Rendel Harris in 1893 at St. Catherine's. He was working with the twins on collating and photographing Codex B.

The twins combined and published a three-column version in 1899 of Codices A, B, and C.

The three main manuscripts are all lectionaries and contain only the Gospels; however, there are fragments of Gospels, Acts, and most of the Pauline Epistles. Newer discoveries from Hyrcania (fortress) include fragments of the text. All told, a large percentage of the New Testament canon is represented, with only a few books having no witness in Palestinian Syriac.

Scholars believe that the Palestinian Syriac originated between A.D. 300 and 600, many preferring the latter period. The text is noted for its many Graecisms, words that could be better in Aramaic but were instead translated through the Greek and making use of its influence.

The Palestinian Syriac version agrees with no one type of text, but embodies elements from quite disparate families and texts.

Scholars (Metzger and Lagrange) believe that the Palestinian Syriac's distinct Greek influence into the language and its Diatessaron leanings mean that it is an entirely different translation in contrast to the other Syriac Bibles, the Old Syriac and Peshitta.

By the time many of the extant manuscripts were written in the ninth to eleventh centuries, Aramaic was almost certainly a liturgical language instead of a lingua franca, as Arabic had become the norm during the Muslim conquests. In fact early Bible translations into Arabic predate the main manuscripts of Palestinian Syriac, but it has been posited that the Syriac was being used in the liturgy of the church even though few could read or speak it.

== See also ==
- Syriac versions of the Bible
- Peshitta, the modern Syriac version of the Bible
- Syriac Sinaiticus, another Syriac version discovered by Lewis in 1892
