= Zeitschrift für die Neutestamentliche Wissenschaft =

- Discipline: New Testament
- Language: English, French, German
- Edited by: Michael Wolter

Publication details
- History: 1900-present
- Publisher: Walter de Gruyter
- Frequency: Biannually

Standard abbreviations
- ISO 4: Z. Neutest. Wiss.

Indexing
- ISSN: 0044-2615 (print); 1613-009X (web)
- LCCN: a20000462
- OCLC no.: 1773087

Links
- Journal homepage; Online access; Online archive

The Zeitschrift für die Neutestamentliche Wissenschaft und die Kunde der älteren Kirche (English: Journal for New Testament Studies and the Ancient Church) is a biannual peer-reviewed academic journal that was established in 1900. It is published by Walter de Gruyter. The focus of the journal is the historical investigation of early Christianity, especially on the New Testament and nascent Christianity through to the Patristic period. The current editor-in-chief is Michael Wolter. Articles are in German, English, or French.

A related journal from the same publisher is the Zeitschrift für die Alttestamentliche Wissenschaft.

== See also ==
- List of theological journals
