= Codex Corbeiensis I =

Latin manuscript of the New Testament

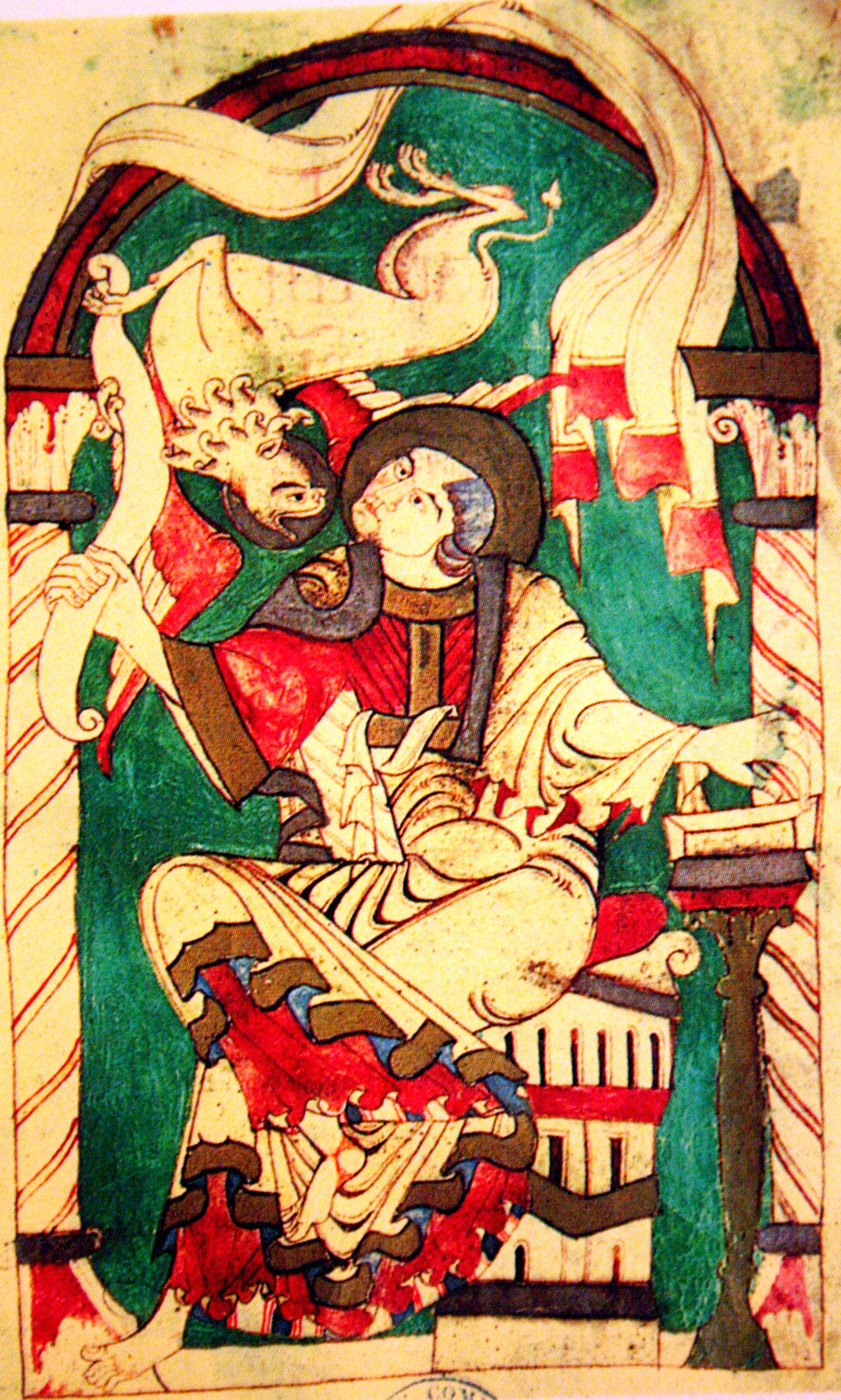
Portrait of Mark Evangelist

The Codex Corbeiensis I, designated by ff^{1} or 9 (in the Beuron system), is an 8th, 9th, or 10th-century Latin New Testament manuscript, written on vellum. The manuscript contains 39 parchment folios with the text of the four Gospels, Acts of the Apostles, and General epistles.

== Text ==
The text of the Gospel of Matthew in the codex transmits one of the pre-Jerome translations known collectively as Old Latin. The rest of the codex contains a predominantly Vulgate text.

Verse Matthew 12:47 is omitted as in codices Codex Sinaiticus, Vaticanus, Codex Regius, 1009, Lectionary 12, k, syr^{c}, syr^{s}, cop^{sa}.

In Matthew 16:12 it has textual variant της ζυμης των αρτων των Φαρισαιων και Σαδδουκαιων (leaven of bread of the Pharisees and Sadducee's) supported only by Codex Sinaiticus and Curetonian Gospels.

== History ==
The manuscript formerly belonged to the monastic Library of Corbie Abbey, on the Somme, near Amiens; and with the most important part of that Library was transferred to the St. Germain des Prés at Paris, about the year 1638, and was there numbered 21. The St. Germain Library was suffered severely during the French Revolution, and Peter Dubrowsky, Secretary to the Russian Embassy at Paris acquired some of manuscripts stolen from the public libraries. It was transferred to the Imperial Library at. St. Petersburg about 1800-1805. It was edited by J. Martianay in 1695 (Vulgata antiqua Latina et versio Evangelii secundum Matthaeum, Paris 1695), Sabatier, Bianchini, Belsheim, Calmet, Migne, and Jülicher.

Currently it is housed at the National Library of Russia (Ov. 3, D. 326) at Saint Petersburg.

== See also ==
- List of New Testament Latin manuscripts
- Codex Corbeiensis II
