= Codex Vercellensis =

Ancient manuscript of the Gospels

The title Codex Vercellensis Evangeliorum refers to two manuscript codices preserved in the cathedral library of Vercelli, in the Piedmont Region, Italy.

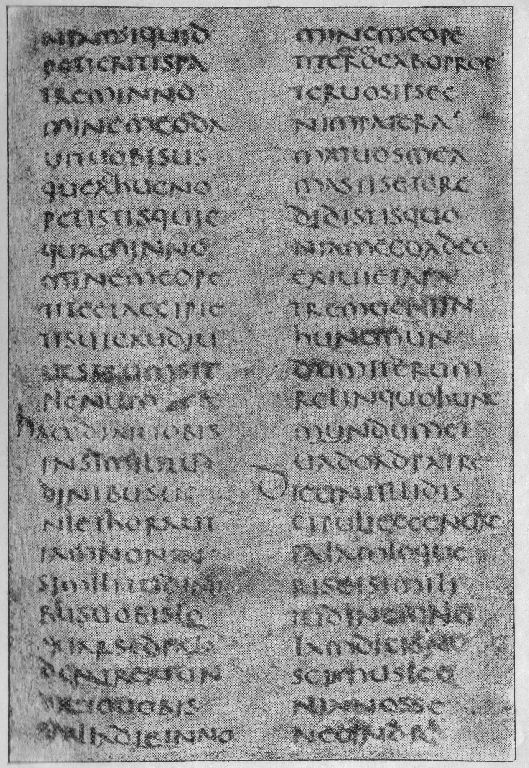
John 16:23-30 in Codex Vercellensis

== Old Latin Codex Vercellensis ==
The Old Latin Codex Vercellensis Evangeliorum, preserved in the cathedral library, is believed to be the earliest manuscript of the Old Latin Gospels. Its standard designation is "Codex a", or 3 in the Beuron system of numeration of Latin Biblical Manuscripts. The order of the gospels in this Codex is Matthew, John, Luke and Mark, which is also found in some other very old "Western" manuscripts, such as Codex Bezae. In its text of Matthew 3, before verse 16, there is a statement that a light suddenly shone when Jesus was baptized (Et cum baptizaretur, lumen ingens circumfulsit de aqua, ita ut timerent omnes qui advenerant). It contains the last twelve verses of the Gospel of Mark, but on a replacement-page. The original final pages after Mark 15:15 have been lost, and the replacement-page resumes mid-sentence in 16:7 and includes the text to the end of verse 20, but in the Vulgate version. Space considerations suggest that it is unlikely that the original, non-extant pages included verses 9-20, but this calculation (made by C. H. Turner in 1928) depends on unverifiable assumptions that only four pages have been lost, that the scribe did not accidentally skip any text, and that the person who made the replacement-page had access to the missing page that it replaced. However Turner did not explain why a scribe would replace only one of four pages. It is more probable that the replacement-page was removed from another manuscript than that it was made to insert in Codex Vercellensis. The text of Codex Vercellensis is related to the text of Codex Corbeiensis II (ff^{2}), another Old Latin copy (in which Mark 16:9-20 is included).

According to a respectable tradition, this codex was written under the direction of bishop Eusebius of Vercelli, which would date it to the late fourth century. It contains the Euthalian Apparatus and Acts of Peter.

It was restored and stabilised in the early twentieth century. Having been used for the taking of oaths in the early Middle Ages, much of it is either difficult to read or even destroyed, so that we are frequently dependent on the earlier editors for knowledge of its text.

The manuscript now has several missing pages. Current extant portions are:

- Matthew 1:1-25:1, 13-28:20.
- Mark 1:1-21, 35-15:15 (Mark 16:7-20 added from separate manuscript).
- Luke 1:1-11:11, 27-12:36, 60-24:54.
- John 1:1-21:25.

== Textual features ==
In Matthew 27:9 in the sentence fulfilled what was spoken by Jeremiah the prophet, the Codex omits the word Jeremiah (Ieremiam), just like in the manuscripts: Codex Beratinus, Minuscule 33, Old-Latin Codex Veronensis (b), syr^{s}, syr^{p}, and cop^{bo}.

In Luke 23:34 it omits the words: "And Jesus said: Father forgive them, they know not what they do." This omission is supported by the manuscripts Papyrus 75, Sinaiticus^{a}, B, D*, W, Θ, 0124, 1241, Codex Bezae^{lat}, syr^{s}, cop^{sa}, cop^{bo}.

It also has several omissions called Western non-interpolations.

== See also ==
- Vercelli Book
- Codex Sinaiticus
- Codex Amiatinus

== Bibliography ==
- Giovanni Andrea Irico edition (Sacrosanctus Evangeliorum Codex Sancti Eusebii Vercellensis, 2 volumes, Milan, 1748)
- G. Bianchini edition (Rome, 1749; reprinted in Migne, Patrologia Latina, xii, cols. 141-338)
- J. Belsheim edition (Codex Vercellensis, Christiania, 1897)
- A. Gasquet edition (Codex Vercellensis, Collectanea biblica Latina, iii; Roma, 1914)
