= Codex Borgianus =

Uncial 029
- New Testament manuscript
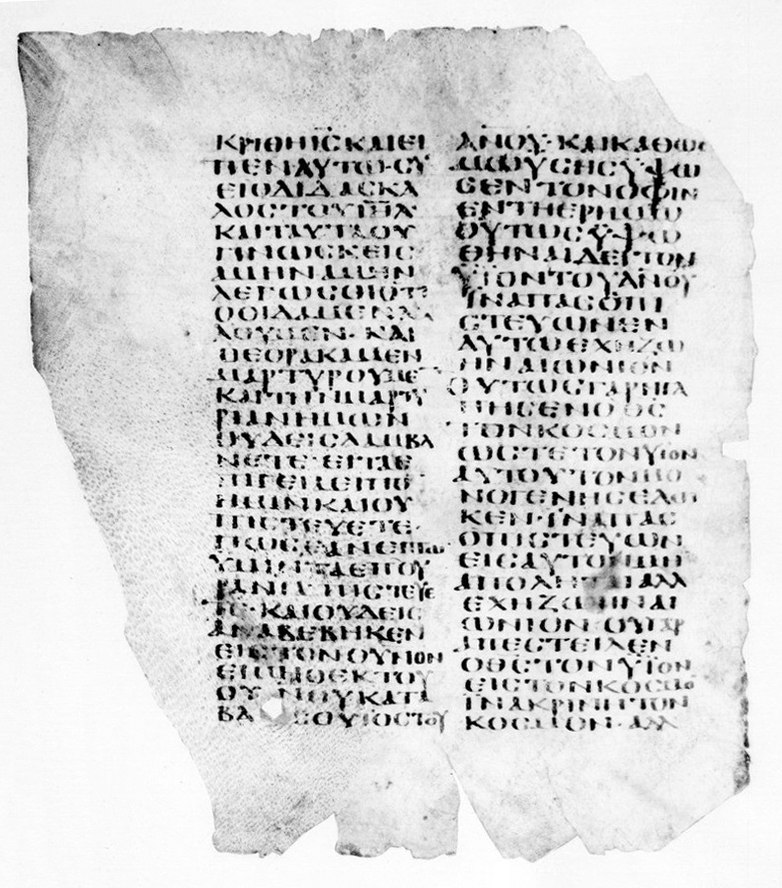
- Page of the codex with text of John 3:10-17
- Name: Borgianus
- Sign: T
- Text: Luke and John
- Date: 5th century
- Script: Greek-Sahidic diglot
- Now at: Vatican Library
- Size: 26 cm by 21 cm
- Type: Alexandrian text-type
- Category: II
- Note: close to codex B

Codex Borgianus, designated by T or 029 (in the Gregory-Aland numbering), ε 5 (von Soden), is a Greek and Sahidic uncial manuscript of the Gospels, dated palaeographically to the 5th century. The name of the codex came from its former owners.

== Contains ==
The Greek text of the codex contains:

- Luke 6:18-26; 18:2-9.10-16; 18:32-19:8; 21:33-22:3; 22:20-23:20; 24:25-27; 29-31;
- John 1:24-32; 3:10-17; 4:52-5:7; 6:28-67; 7:6-8:31.

The Sahidic text of the codex contains:

- Luke 6:11-18; 17:29-18:9; 18:?-42; 21:25-32; 22:12-23:11; 24:18-19; 24:21-23;
- John 1:16-23; 3:2-10; 4:45-52; 6:21-58; 6:58-8:23.

== Description ==
The codex contains 17 parchment leaves (26 cm by 21 cm), with fragments of the Gospel of Luke 6, 17-19, 21-24 and Gospel of John 1, 3-4, 6-8. The manuscript is written in two columns per page, 26-33 lines per page, with the Greek and Sahidic on facing pages. Lines are very short, only 6, 7, 8, and 9 letters in lines. It is written in large letters compressed only on the edge. The letters are square. Tischendorf suggested the scribe was a Copt, because the letters often show Coptic forms. There is no notation of sections or other divisions. The shapes of alpha and iota are specially noticeable. It has no accents and breathings.

== Text ==
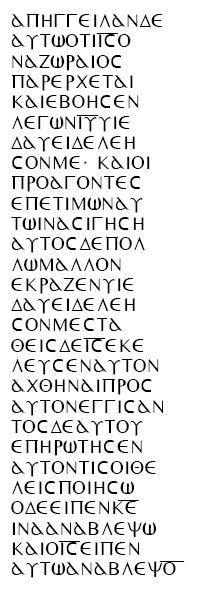
Luke 18:37-42a in codex (facsimile)

The Greek text of this codex is a secondary representative of the Alexandrian text-type (named also Egyptian text) with a mixture of the Byzantine readings. Kurt Aland placed it in Category II. The Alexandrian text of the Gospel of John stands in close relationship to the Codex Vaticanus, and P^{75}.

The text of Luke 22:43-44 is omitted, as in codices p^{75}, א*, A, B, 1071.

It does not contain John 5:4 (0125) or the Pericope Adulterae (John 7:53-8:11).

It reads βηθαβαρα in John 1:28 and βηθσαιδα in John 5:2.

== History ==
The manuscript came from the White Monastery. It once belonged to Cardinal Stefano Borgia, hence the name of the codex.

Fragments of the codex were discovered independently at separate times and were numbered 029, 0113, 0125, and 0139. Together they have 23 leaves. "It appears that the ignorant monk who brought this manuscript with him from Egypt to Europe, was so unaware of its value, that he lost the greater part of the leaves".

The text of Codex 029 was carefully edited in 1789 by A. A. Giorgi. The manuscript was examined by Birch, who collated the Greek text of 029. Birch gave this description of the codex:

Codex in membranis scriptus est, charactere unciali quadro, graeco textui adjecta est versio coptica. Vehementer sane dolendum, particulam tam exiguam eximini codicis servatam esse, ex quo, si integrum aetas tulisset, plurima ad textus emendationem peti potuissent.

Henri Hyvernat purchased two pages in 1912 in Cairo for John Pierpont Morgan.

== Present location ==
A few leaves from Uncial 070, formerly designated by T^{a}, were wrongly listed by Tregelles as a part of the same codex to which Borgianus belonged.

The codex is located at the Vatican Library (Borgia Coptic 109), in New York City (Pierpont Morgan M 664A), and in Paris (BnF Copt. 129).

== See also ==
- List of New Testament uncials
- Coptic versions of the Bible
- Textual criticism
