= Bible translations into Geʽez =

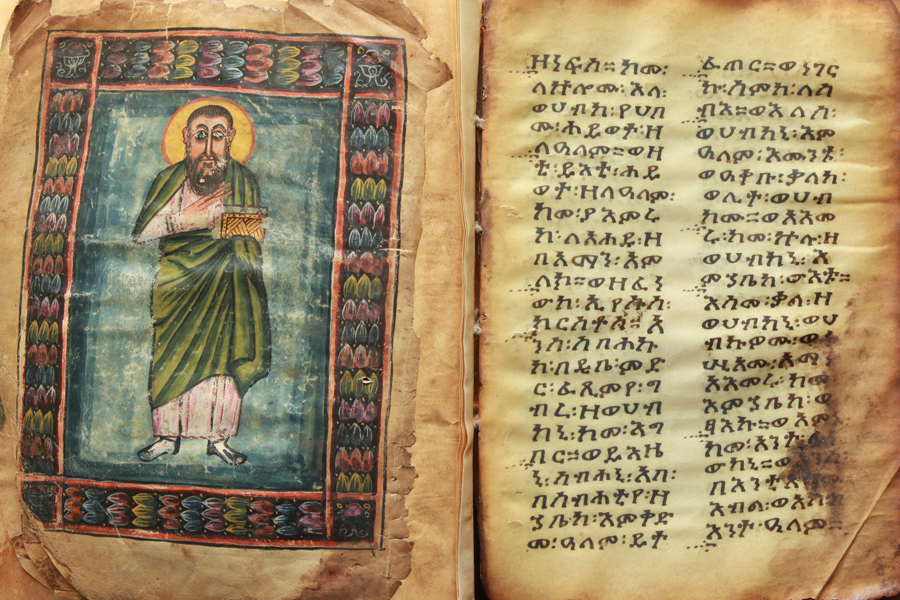
Two pages from the Garima Gospels

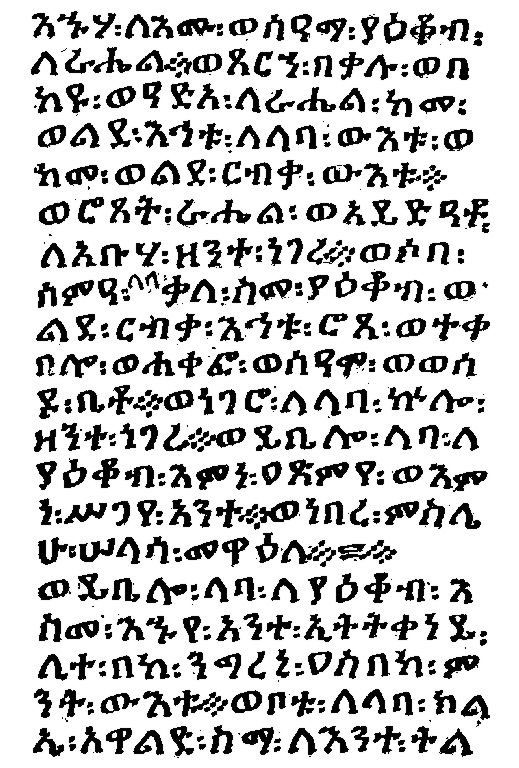
Genesis in Geʽez

Bible translations into Geʽez, an ancient Ethio-Semitic language, date back to the 6th century at least, making them one of the world's oldest Bible translations.

Translations of the Bible in Geʽez, in a predecessor of the Geʽez script which did not possess vowels, were created between the 5th and 7th century, soon after the Christianization of Ethiopia in the 4th century. This took place in a period of time alongside which other canonical and liturgical texts were being translated into Geʽez, as is indicated by the Aksumite Collection.

The Garima Gospels are the oldest translation of the Bible in Geʽez and the world's earliest complete illustrated Christian manuscript. Monastic tradition holds that they were composed close to the year 500, a date supported by recent radiocarbon analysis; samples from Garima 2 proposed a date of c. 390–570, while counterpart dating of samples from Garima 1 proposed a date of c. 530–660. The Garima Gospels is also thought to be the oldest surviving Geʽez manuscript.

The milestones of the modern editions were the Roman edition of the New Testament in 1548 edited by Tasfa Seyon, which is the editio princeps, and the critical edition of the New Testament by Thomas P. Platt in 1830 (his edition of the Geʽez four Gospels was first published in 1826).

Biblical manuscripts in Geʽez existed until at least the late 17th century.

In 2009, the Ethiopian Catholic Church and the Ethiopian Orthodox Tewahedo Church associated themselves with the Bible Society of Ethiopia to produce a printed version of the Bible in Geʽez. The New Testament was released in 2017.
