= Codex Corbeiensis II =

Old Latin manuscript of the four Gospels

The Codex Corbeiensis II, designated by ff^{2} or 8 (in the Beuron system), is a 5th-century Latin Gospel Book. The text, written on vellum, is a version of the old Latin. The manuscript contains 190 parchment folio with the text of the four Gospels with lacunae (Matt 1:1-11:16; Luke 9:48; 10:20.21; 11:45-12:6.7; John 17:15-18:9; 20:22-21:8). Written in a beautiful round uncial hand.

Gospels follow in the sequence: Matthew, Luke, John, Mark.

The Latin text of the codex is a representative Western text-type in itala recension. The text is akin to preserved in Codex Vercellensis and Codex Veronensis.

The manuscript formerly belonged to the monastic Library of Corbie Abbey, on the Somme, near Amiens; and with the most important part of that Library was transferred to St. Germain des Prés at Paris, about the year 1638, and was there numbered 195. It was quoted by Sabatier, Bianchini gave a collation in Mark, Luke, and John. Full text was published by Johannes Belsheim, Augustine Calmet, Migne, and Jülicher.

Currently it is housed at the National Library of France (Lat. 17225) at Paris.

== See also ==
- List of New Testament Latin manuscripts
- Codex Corbeiensis I
