= Codex Bobiensis =

Old Latin manuscript of the New Testament

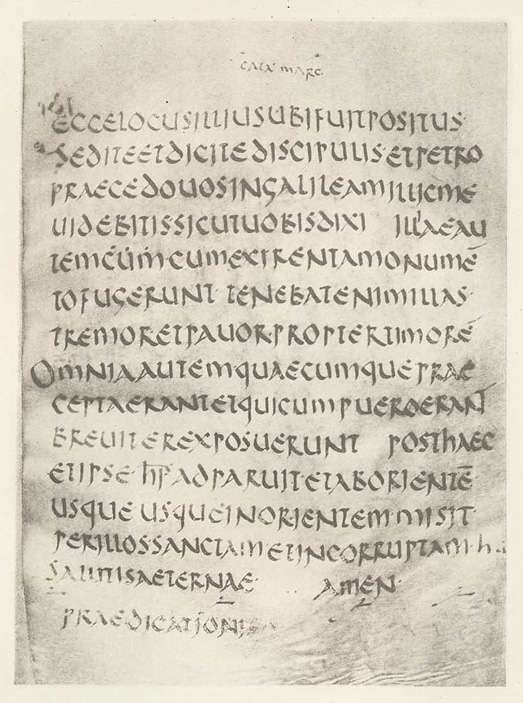
Codex Bobiensis – The last page of the Gospel of Mark.

Codex Bobiensis or Bobbiensis is one of the oldest Old Latin manuscripts of the New Testament, albeit in fragmentary form. It is designated by the siglum k or VL 1 in the Beuron register of Late Latin New Testament manuscripts. The text contains parts of the Gospel of Mark (Mark 8:8-16:8) and Gospel of Matthew (Matthew 1:1-15:36).

Codex Bobiensis is the only known example of the shorter ending added directly to Mark 16:8, but not the "longer ending" through Mark 16:20. Using the study of comparative writing styles (palaeography), it is assigned to the (375-425) 4th or 5th century AD.

== Mark 16 ==
There is a unique reading following Mark 16:3:

Subito autem ad horam tertiam tenebrae diei factae sunt per totum orbem terrae, et descenderunt de caelis angeli et surgent in claritate vivi Dei (viri duo?); simul ascenderunt cum eo, et continuo lux facta est.

The text requires some guesswork. Biblical scholar Bruce Metzger provides the following translation:

But suddenly at the third hour of the day there was darkness over the whole circle of the earth, and angels descended from the heavens, and as he [the Lord] was rising in the glory of the living God, at the same time they ascended with him; and immediately it was light.

The "Shorter Ending" runs as follows:

Omnia autem quaecumque praecepta erant et qui cum puero erant breviter exposuerunt. Posthaec et ipse ihesus adparuit, et ab orientem usque usque in orientem misit per illos sanctam et incorruptam [praedicationis] salutis aeternae. Amen.

But they reported briefly to the boy (Note: The text in Latin reads: "cum puero", meaning "to the boy", instead of the most commonly found "cum petro", which is "to Peter".) and those with him all that they had been told. And after this, Jesus himself (appeared to them and) sent out by means of them, from east to east, the sacred and imperishable (proclamation) of eternal salvation. Amen.

== Matthew 8 ==
In Matthew 8:12 it represents the textual variant ἐξελεύσονται (will go out) instead of ἐκβληθήσονται (will be thrown).

This variant is supported only by two Greek manuscripts,Codex Sinaiticus and Codex Climaci Rescriptus, and by the Syriac^{c, s, p, pal}, the Armenian, and the Diatessaron.

== History ==
The manuscript was probably written in North Africa, and is dated to the 4th or 5th century. Later, it was brought to the monastery in Bobbio in northern Italy. It was traditionally assigned to St. Columban, who died in the monastery he had founded there, in 615.

Researchers, comparing the Codex Bobiensis with quotes from Cyprian’s publications from the 3rd century, think it may represent a page from the Bible Cyprian used while he was a bishop in Carthage. A palaeographic study of the scripture determined it is a copy of a papyrus script from the 2nd century. The text of the codex is considered a representative of the Western text-type. It is currently housed in the Turin National University Library.

== See also ==
- The 192 images of the manuscript are visible at https://bobbiensis.sib.swiss

== External links and sources ==
- Bible Research: Codex Bobbiensis
- Catholic Planet: The Writing of the Gospels – Mark
- BIBLE VIEWS: Christian Doctrine and Practice: Translations and the Greek Text
- Image
