= Curetonian Gospels =

Manuscript of the New Testament in Old Syriac

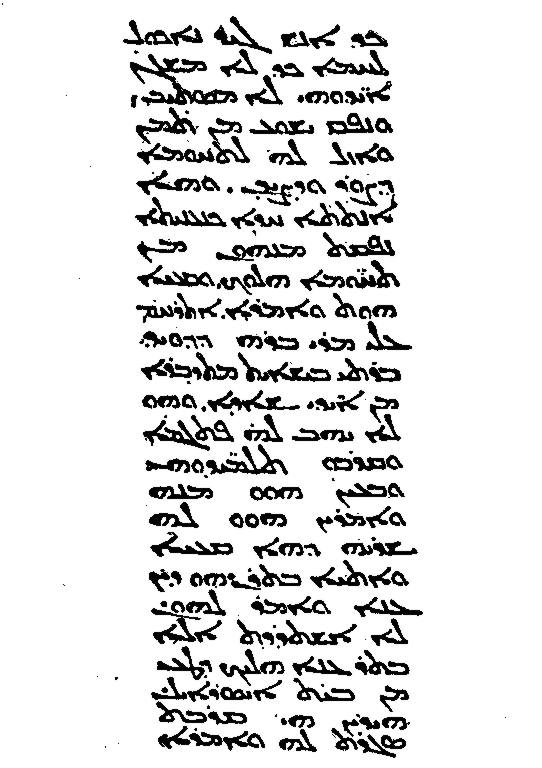
Curetonian Gospels, Matt 15-20-25

The Curetonian Gospels, designated by the siglum syr^{cur}, are contained in a manuscript of the four gospels of the New Testament in Old Syriac. Together with the Sinaiticus Palimpsest the Curetonian Gospels form the Old Syriac Version, and are known as the Evangelion Dampharshe ("Separated Gospels") in the Syriac Orthodox Church.

The Gospels are named after William Cureton who maintained that they represented an Aramaic Gospel and had not been translated from Greek (1858) and differed considerably from the canonical Greek texts, with which they had been collated and "corrected". Henry Harman (1885) concluded, however, that their originals had been Greek from the outset. The order of the gospels is Matthew, Mark, John, Luke. The text is one of only two Syriac manuscripts of the separate gospels that possibly predate the standard Syriac version, the Peshitta; the other is the Sinaitic Palimpsest. A fourth Syriac text is the Gospel harmony Diatessaron. The Curetonian Gospels and the Sinaitic Palimpsest appear to have been translated from independent Greek originals.

== History ==
The manuscript gets its name from being edited and published by William Cureton in 1858. The manuscript was among a number of manuscripts obtained by the British Museum in 1842 from the Syrian monastery of Saint Mary Deipara in the Wadi Natroun, Lower Egypt. This was the result of a series of negotiations that had been under way for some time; it is now conserved in the British Library. Cureton recognized that the Old Syriac text of the gospels was significantly different from any known at the time. He dated the manuscript fragments to the fifth century; the text, which may be as early as the second century, is written in the Esṭrangelā form, the oldest, classical version of the Syriac alphabet, and without vowel points.

In 1872, William Wright, of the University of Cambridge, privately printed about a hundred copies of further fragments, Fragments of the Curetonian Gospels, (London, 1872), without translation or critical apparatus. The fragments, bound as flyleaves in a Syriac codex in Berlin, once formed part of the Curetonian manuscript, and fill some of its lacunae.

The publication of the Curetonian Gospels and the Sinaitic Palimpsest enabled scholars for the first time to examine how the gospel text in Syriac changed between the earliest period (represented by the text of the Sinai and Curetonian manuscripts) and the later period. The Syriac versions of the New Testament remain less studied than the Greek.

The standard text is that of Francis Crawford Burkitt, 1904; it was used in the comparative edition of the Syriac gospels that was edited by George Anton Kiraz, 1996.

The Curetonian Gospels are often cited in textual criticism of the New Testament. They are cited as a Syriac version with siglum syr^{cur} to distinguish them from Sinaitic Palimpsest syr^{s}, the Harclean Syriac syr^{h}, and others.

== Text ==
The Syriac text of the codex is a representative of the Western text. Significant variant readings include:

- In Matthew 4:23, the variant "in whole Galilee" together with Codex Vaticanus Graecus 1209, Codex Bobiensis, ℓ 20 and cop^{sa}. Matthew 12:47 is omitted.
- In Matthew 16:12, the variant leaven of bread of the Pharisees and Sadducees supported only by Codex Sinaiticus and Codex Corbeiensis I.
- In Luke 23:43, the variant I say today to you, you will be with me in paradise supported only by unspaced dot in Codex Vaticanus and lack of punctuation in earlier Greek MSS.

== See also ==
- Syriac versions of the Bible
