= Codex Beratinus =

Medieval Albanian New Testament manuscript

Uncial 043
- New Testament manuscript
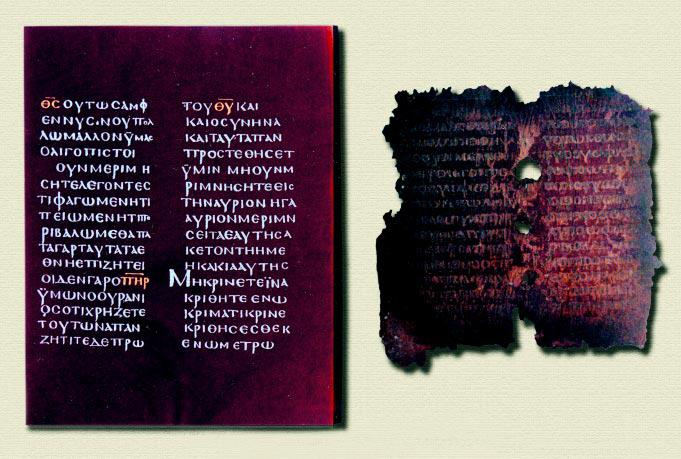
- Left: Facsimile of Matthew 6:30b-7:2a Right: Page from Codex Beratinus
- Name: Beratinus
- Sign: Φ
- Text: Gospel of Matthew, Gospel of Mark
- Date: 6th-century
- Script: Greek
- Now at: National Archives of Albania
- Cite: P. Batiffol, Evangeliorum codex Graecus purpureus Beratinus Φ, (Paris and Rome, 1882)
- Size: 31 cm by 27 cm
- Type: Byzantine text-type
- Category: V

Codex Purpureus Beratinus (Albanian: Kodiku i Beratit, Kodiku i Purpurt i Beratit) is an uncial illuminated manuscript Gospel book written in Greek. It is designated by the siglum Φ or 043 in the Gregory-Aland numbering of New Testament manuscripts, and ε 17 in the von Soden numbering of New Testament manuscripts. Using the study of comparative writing styles (palaeography), it has been dated to the 6th-century. The manuscript is written in an uncial hand on purple vellum with silver ink. It is preserved at the Albanian National Archives (shelf number Nr. 1) in Tirana, Albania. It was formerly possessed by the St. George Church in the town of Berat, Albania, hence the 'Beratinus' appellation.

== Description ==
The manuscript is a codex (precursor to the modern book format), containing the Gospel of Matthew and the Gospel of Mark, with several considerable gaps: Matthew 1:1-6:3, 7:26-8:7, 18:23-19:3, and Mark 14:62-end. It contains 190 extant parchment leaves measuring 31.4 × 26.8 cm, or approximately the same size as those of Codex Alexandrinus, and has two columns per page, but the letters are much larger. It is written with 17 lines per page, 8-12 letters per line, in very regular letters, in silver ink. The title and the first line in Mark are written in gold ink. The writing is continuous in full lines without stichometry. Quotations from the Old Testament are marked with an inverted comma (<).

The text is divided according to the chapters (known as κεφαλαια / kephalaia), with the numerals of the κεφαλαια inserted in the left margin, and their titles (known as τιτλοι / titloi) written at the top of the pages. The numerals of the Ammonian sections are given in the left margin, and references to the Eusebian Canons were added by a later hand in the 8th century. A note in the manuscript states that the loss of the other two Gospels is due to "the Franks of Champagne", i.e. some of the Crusaders, who may have seen it while at Patmos, where it was formerly believed to have been.

== Text ==
The Greek text of the codex is considered to be generally a representative of the Byzantine text-type, but it contains the long Western addition after Matthew 20:28, occurring also in Codex Bezae. Biblical scholar Kurt Aland gave it the following textual profile: 131^{1}, 83^{1/2}, 11^{2}, 18^{s}. According to biblical scholar Burnett H. Streeter, Codex Beratinus is a tertiary witness to the Caesarean text. It is grouped with N, O, Σ, and Uncial 080 to constitute the Purple Uncials. Kurt Aland placed the first four manuscripts into Category V of his New Testament manuscript classification system, and it is certain that they are more Byzantine than anything else. Aland did not categorize Uncial 080.

Addition to Matthew 20:28
"But seek to increase from that which is small, and to become less from which is greater. When you enter into a house and are summoned to dine, do not sit down at the prominent places, lest perchance a man more honorable than you come in afterwards, and he who invited you come and say to you, "Go down lower"; and you shall be ashamed. But if you sit down in the inferior place, and one inferior to you come in, then he that invited you will say to you, "Go up higher"; and this will be advantageous for you."

In Matthew 21:9, the following interpolation occurs, sharing affinity only with the Curetonian Gospels (labelled as sy^{c}):

και εξελθον εις υπαντησιν αυτω πολλοι χαιροντες και δοξαζοντες τον θεον περι παντων ων ειδον
And many went out to meet him, rejoicing and glorifying God for all that they had seen.

Some notable readings

Matthew 27:9

επληρωθη το ρηθεν δια του προφητου (fulfilled what was spoken by the prophet) - Φ 33 a b sy^{s,}^{p} bo
επληρωθη το ρηθεν δια Ιερεμιου του προφητου (fulfilled what was spoken by Jeremiah the prophet) - Majority of Manuscripts.

Matthew 27:16

ος δια φονον και στασιν ην βεβλημενοις εις φυλακην (who for murder and insurrection had been thrown in prison) - Φ
omit. - Majority of Manuscripts.

Matthew 27:35

ἵνα πληρώθη τὸ ῤηθὲν διὰ τοῦ προφήτου, Διεμερίσαντο τὰ ἱμάτια μου ἑαυτοῖς καὶ ἐπὶ τὸν ἱματισμὸν μου ἔβαλον κλῆρον (that may be fulfilled what was spoken through the Prophet: They divided my clothes for themselves, and threw lots for my garment) - Φ 0250 Δ Θ 124 348 517 788 1279 1424 1579 1582
omit. - Majority of Manuscripts.

== History ==
The earliest history of the manuscript is unknown. It was formerly believed to have been at Patmos. According to Xhevat Lloshi it came from Ballsh. It was held in Berat, Albania from 1356. The text of the codex was published by Pierre Batiffol in 1887. Apparently during World War II, Adolf Hitler learned about the manuscript and sought it out. Accordingly, Several monks and priests risked their lives to hide the manuscript.

Oscar von Gebhardt designated it by the siglum Φ, which is often used in critical editions. Since 1971, it has been preserved at the National Archives of Albania in Tirana.

== Importance as cultural heritage ==
Codex Purpureus Beratinus was inscribed on the UNESCO’s Memory of the World Register in 2005 in recognition of its historical significance. The two Beratinus codices preserved in Albania are very important for the global community and the development of ancient biblical, liturgical and hagiographical literature and are part of the "seven purple codices", which were written over a period of 13 centuries, i.e. from the sixth to the eighteenth centuries. The other five "purple codices" are in Italy (two), France (one), England (one), and Greece (one).

== See also ==
- Codex Athous Lavrensis (Ψ / 044)
- Codex Rossanensis (Σ / 042)
- List of New Testament uncials
- Textual criticism
- Purple parchment
