= Codex Vindobonensis Lat. 1235 =

6th-century Latin Gospel Book

The Codex Vindobonensis Lat. 1235, designated by i or 17 (in the Beuron system), is a 6th-century Latin Gospel Book. The manuscript contains 142 folios (26 cm by 19 cm). The text, written on purple dyed vellum in silver ink (as are codices a b e f j), is a version of the old Latin. The Gospels follow in the Western order.

It has numerous lacunae. Surviving texts contain only: Luke 10:6-23:10; Mark 2:17-3:29; 4:4-10:1; 10:33-14:36; 15:33-40.

The Latin text of the codex is a representative of the Western text-type in itala recension.

Formerly the manuscript belonged to an Augustinian Monastery at Naples. In 1717 it was brought to Vienna together with 94 other manuscripts. It was held in Vienna, in the Hofbibliothek, Lat. 1235). It was examined by Bianchini. The text was edited by Alter, Johannes Belsheim, and Jülicher.

It was named Vindobonensis after Vienna (Lat. 1235), place of its former housing.

Currently it is housed at the Biblioteca Nazionale (Lat. 3) at Naples.

== See also ==
- List of New Testament Latin manuscripts
- Purple parchment
- Codex Vindobonensis Lat. 502
