= Matthew 20 =

- ← chapter 19 chapter 21 →
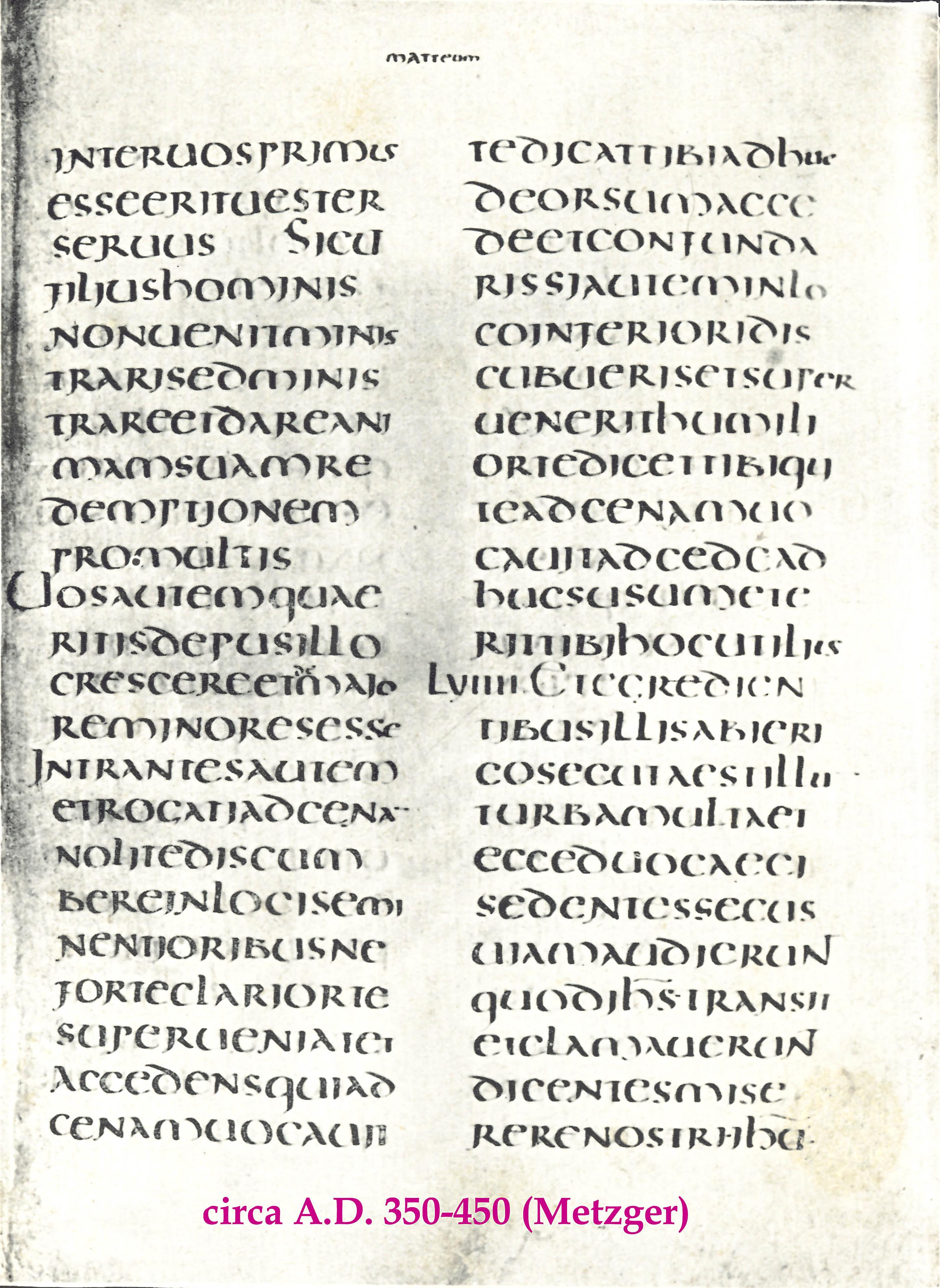
- The Latin text of Matthew 20:27–30 in Codex Claromontanus V, from 4th or 5th century
- Book: Gospel of Matthew
- Category: Gospel
- Christian Bible part: New Testament
- Order in the Christian part: 1

Matthew 20 is the twentieth chapter in the Gospel of Matthew in the New Testament of the Christian Bible. Jesus continues his final journey through Perea and Jericho, heading towards Jerusalem, which he enters in the following chapter.

== Text ==
The original text was written in Koine Greek. This chapter is divided into 34 verses.

=== Textual witnesses ===
Some early manuscripts containing the text of this chapter include:

- Codex Vaticanus (AD 325–350)
- Codex Sinaiticus (330–360)
- Codex Bezae (c. 400)
- Codex Washingtonianus (c. 400)
- Codex Ephraemi Rescriptus (c. 450)
- Codex Purpureus Rossanensis (6th century)
- Codex Petropolitanus Purpureus (6th century; extant verses 7–34)
- Codex Sinopensis (6th century; extant verses 9–34)
- Papyrus 83 (6th century; extant verses 23–25, 30–31)

== Structure ==
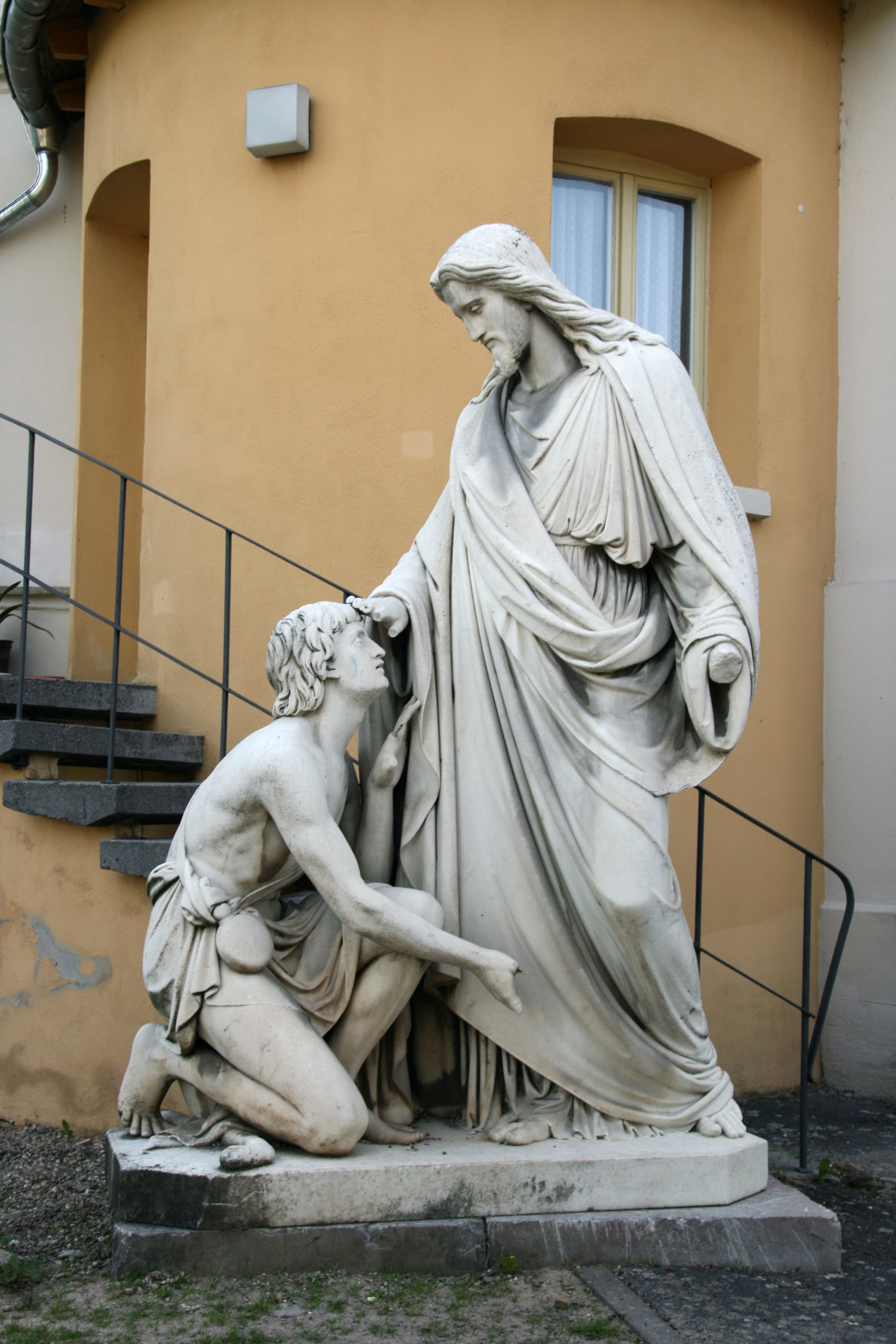
Jesus healing blind Bartimaeus, by Johann Heinrich Stöver, 1861. Bartimaeus is not named in Matthew's narrative.

The New King James Version (NKJV) organises this chapter as follows:

- The Parable of the Workers in the Vineyard (Matthew 20:1–16)
- Jesus a Third Time Predicts His Death and Resurrection (Matthew 20:17–19; Mark 10:32–34; Luke 18:31–34)
- Greatness is Serving (Matthew 20:20–28)
- Two Blind Men Receive Their Sight (Matthew 20:29–34).

== Continuity with Matthew 19 ==
The parable of the workers in the vineyard illustrates the aphorism in Matthew 19:30: Many who are first will be last, and the last first. Anglican theologian E. H. Plumptre argues that the division of the chapters at this point is "singularly unfortunate, as separating the parable both from the events which gave occasion to it and from the teaching which it illustrates. It is not too much to say that we can scarcely understand it at all unless we connect it with the history of the young ruler who had great possessions, and the claims which the disciples had made for themselves when they contrasted their readiness with his reluctance". Lutheran Pietist Johann Bengel argues, likewise, that a link is to be made with Peter's enquiry in Matthew 19:27: "See, we have left all and followed You. Therefore what shall we have?"

The appointment of Jesus' twelve disciples to "sit on twelve thrones, judging the twelve tribes of Israel" in "the regeneration" (Matthew 19:20–28) may also be contrasted with the request of the mother of Zebedee's children, possibly Salome, that the seats of Jesus' right and left in the kingdom of heaven to be allocated to James and John (Matthew 20:20–21).

== Parable of the workers in the vineyard ==
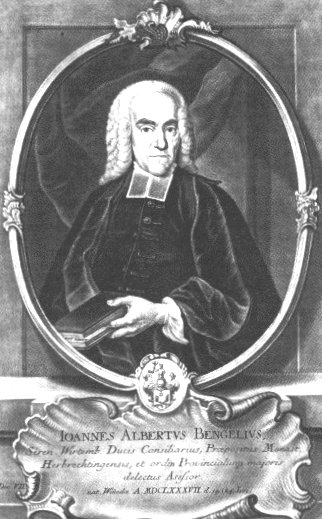
Johann Albrecht Bengel

This parable is only related by Matthew. It asserts that "the kingdom of heaven is like a landowner who went out early in the morning to hire laborers for his vineyard".

=== Verse 2 ===
Now when he [the landowner] had agreed with the laborers for a denarius a day, he sent them into his vineyard.

Bengel notes that the landowner deals with the first group of labourers by legal contract, promising to pay an agreed sum, and with the others "more by mere liberality".

=== Verses 9–12 ===
Many details of the parable, including when the workers receive their pay at the end of the day, the complaints from those who worked a full day, and the response from the king/landowner are paralleled in a similar parable found in tractate Berakhot in the Jerusalem Talmud.

=== Verse 16 ===
So the last will be first, and the first last. For many are called, but few chosen.

Dale Allison suggests a reading of this verse according to which Jesus himself is seen as "the last (in his sufferings and death) who will be the first (when God exalts him)".

The second part of this verse, For many are called, but few [are] chosen, is not included in Codex Vaticanus, Codex Regius, Codex Dublinensis or Codex Sinaiticus. The words are included in the Textus Receptus, and by Scrivener, and they appear in the King James Version, but they are omitted from the American Standard Version and the New International Version.

== The journey towards Jerusalem ==
=== Verse 17 ===
Now Jesus, going up to Jerusalem, took the twelve disciples aside on the road, and said to them,

This verse continues the journey commenced in Matthew 19:1. There are three typical readings of this verse:

- Jesus ... took the twelve disciples aside on the road, and said to them (New King James Version, cf. Geneva Bible, King James Version, Jerusalem Bible)
- Jesus ... took the twelve disciples aside, and on the way he said to them (Revised Standard Version, cf. American Standard Version, Amplified Version, Holman Christian Standard Bible).
- The words "on the way" are missing from the Latin Vulgate and from the Douay-Rheims Version:

Et ascendens Jesus Jerosolymam, assumpsit duodecim discipulos secreto, et ait illis:

And Jesus going up to Jerusalem, took the twelve disciples apart, and said to them:

=== Verses 18–19 ===
^{18} "Behold, we are going up to Jerusalem, and the Son of Man will be betrayed to the chief priests and to the scribes; and they will condemn Him to death, ^{19} and deliver Him to the Gentiles to mock and to scourge and to crucify. And the third day He will rise again."

This third announcement or prediction of the manner of Jesus' death follows on from Matthew 16:21 and 17:23. The three classes of Jesus' antagonists have now been revealed: the Jewish leaders (16:21), one of the twelve, who will betray him (17:23), and (here) the Roman authorities.

=== Verse 20 ===
Then the mother of Zebedee's sons came to Him with her sons, kneeling down and asking something from Him.

The mother of Zebedee's sons, James and John, is known to have been Salome, "as we learn by comparing Matthew 27:56 with Mark 15:40". Her request is described as "ambitious". Matthew's text here is "more graphic" and detailed than Mark's parallel (Mark 10:35).

=== Verse 22 ===
But Jesus answered and said, "You do not know what you ask. Are you able to drink the cup that I am about to drink, and be baptized with the baptism that I am baptized with?" They said to Him, "We are able."

While this dialogue is initiated by Salome, Jesus directs his answer to James and John themselves.

=== Departure from Jericho ===
Matthew's narrative portrays the healing of two blind men taking place as Jesus, his disciples and a great multitude leave Jericho, although their passage back over the River Jordan and their arrival in Jericho are not described. The Ethiopic version, uniquely, reads here "as they went out from Jerusalem".

== See also ==
- Parables of Jesus
- James, son of Zebedee
- John, son of Zebedee
- Related Bible parts: Mark 10, Luke 18
