= Matthew 21 =

- ← chapter 20 chapter 22 →
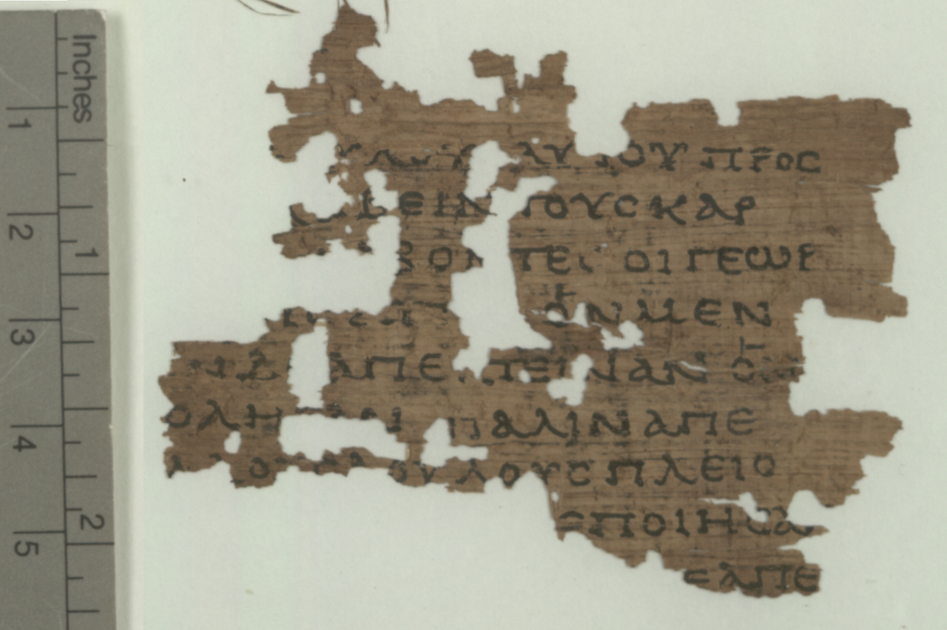
- Gospel of Matthew 21:34–37 on the recto side of Papyrus 104, from c. AD 250
- Book: Gospel of Matthew
- Category: Gospel
- Christian Bible part: New Testament
- Order in the Christian part: 1

Matthew 21 is the twenty-first chapter in the Gospel of Matthew in the New Testament section of the Christian Bible. Jesus triumphally or majestically arrives in Jerusalem and commences his final ministry before his Passion.

== Structure ==
The narrative can be divided into the following subsections:

- Triumphal entry into Jerusalem (21:1–11)
- Cleansing of the Temple (21:12–17)
- Cursing the fig tree (21:18–22)
- Authority of Jesus questioned (21:23–27)
- Parable of the Two Sons (21:28–32)
- Parable of the Wicked Husbandmen (21:33–46)

== Text ==
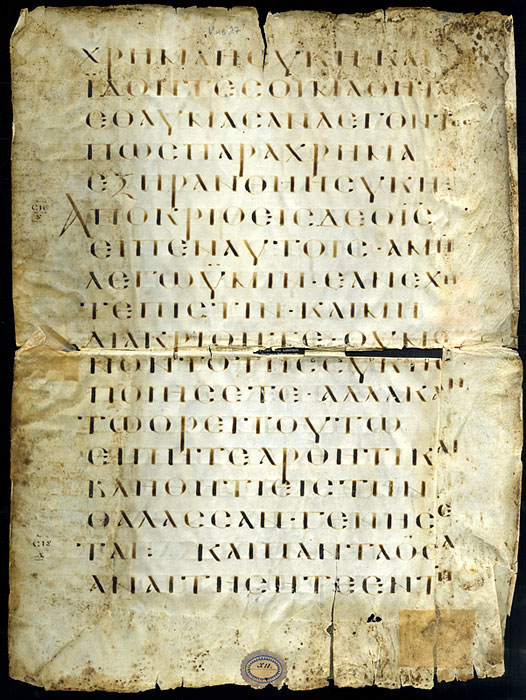
Matthew 21:19–24 on Uncial 087, 6th century

The original text was written in Koine Greek. This chapter is divided into 46 verses.

=== Textual witnesses ===
Some early manuscripts containing the text of this chapter are:

- Papyrus 104 (AD ~250; extant verses 34–37, 43, 45)
- Codex Vaticanus (325–350)
- Codex Sinaiticus (330–360)
- Codex Bezae (c. 400)
- Codex Washingtonianus (c. 400)
- Codex Ephraemi Rescriptus (c. 450)
- Codex Purpureus Rossanensis (6th century)
- Codex Petropolitanus Purpureus (6th century; extant verses 7–34)
- Codex Sinopensis (6th century; extant verses 1–18)
- Uncial 087 (6th century; extant verses 19–24)

=== Old Testament references ===
- Verse 5: Isaiah 62:11, Zechariah 9:9
- Verse 13: Isaiah 56:7; Jeremiah 7:11
- Verse 16: Psalm 8:2

=== New Testament parallels ===
- Matthew 21:13: Mark 11:17; Luke 19:46

== Triumphal entry of Jesus into Jerusalem (21:1–11) ==
The narrative takes some topics from previous chapters:

- the fulfillment of prophecies (cf. 1:22–3, etc.)
- Jesus' entry into Jerusalem (cf. 16:21; 20:17)
- his 'meekness' (cf. 11:29)
- his status as 'king' (cf. 2:1–12)
- 'Son of David' (cf. 1:1—18)
- 'the coming one' (cf. 3:11; 11:3), and
- 'prophet' (cf. 13:57)

The "great multitude" (verse 8) had followed Jesus through the neighbouring city of Jericho in the previous chapter.

The initial part of the narrative also offers two "firsts":

- (1) Jesus' (indirect) 'public claim to messianic kingship', and
- (2) the crowds' 'recognition of that kingship' (contrast 16:13–14).

These two "firsts" challenge the people of Jerusalem to make a decision about "who is this Jesus" (cf. verse 10).

=== Verse 2 ===
"Go into the village opposite you, and immediately you will find a donkey tied, and a colt with her. Loose them and bring them to Me."

Commentator Dale Allison is reminded of the finding of donkeys for King Saul recorded in 1 Samuel 10:1–9.

=== Verse 3 ===
"If any one says anything to you, you shall say, 'the Lord has need of them,' and he will send them immediately”.

For Arthur Carr, this account "leads to the inference that the owner of the ass was an adherent of Jesus, who had perhaps not yet declared himself". To William Robertson Nicoll, "it was to be expected that the act would be challenged". For Henry Alford, it is the LORD Jehovah who needs them, for the service of God; for Nicoll, it is Jesus who is the Lord or master who needs them, using the term Ὁ κύριος, ho kurios, in the same manner as where it refers to Jesus in Matthew 8:25: "Save us, Lord; we are perishing."

=== Verse 4 ===
This took place to fulfill what was spoken by the prophet:

Some versions read "All this took place ...", but the word ὅλον (holon, "all") does not appear in a number of early texts.

=== Verse 8 ===
A very large crowd spread their cloaks on the road, while others cut branches from the trees and spread them on the road.

For accuracy, some commentators note that Greek: ο δε πλειστος οχλος (ho de pleistos ochlos) is best read as "most of the people", or "the greatest part of the multitude": thus the Revised Version reads:

And the most part of the multitude spread their garments in the way; and others cut branches from the trees, and spread them in the way.

Nicoll suggests perhaps this minority had no upper garments, or did not care to use them in that way.

Old Testament kings were honored by the spreading of garments in their way, "that their feet might not touch the dusty ground".

=== Verse 11 ===
And the crowds said,

This is the prophet Jesus from Nazareth of Galilee.

== Cleansing of the Temple (21:12–17) ==
=== Verse 12 ===
And Jesus went into the temple of God,

and cast out all them that sold and bought in the temple,
and overthrew the tables of the moneychangers,
and the seats of them that sold doves,

"Money changers": are certain people who sat in the temple at certain times, to receive the "half shekel", and sometimes change the money for it to themselves. It was a custom for every Israelite, once a year, to pay half a shekel towards the temple charge and service, based on the orders given by God to Moses in the wilderness during the numbering of the Israelites, to take half a shekel out of everyone twenty years of age and older, rich or poor (Exodus 30:13), though this does not seem to be designed as a perpetual rule. However, it became a fixed rule, and was annually paid. Every year a public notice was given in all the cities in Israel, that the time of paying the half shekel was nearing, so the people will be ready with their money, for everyone was obliged to pay it, as stated, Notice being thus given, "on the fifteenth day (of the same month), "tables" were placed in the province, or city (which Bartenora interprets [as] Jerusalem; but Maimonides says, the word used is the name of all the cities in the land of Israel, excepting Jerusalem), and on the twenty fifth they sit "in the sanctuary". The same is related by Maimonides. This gives a plain account of these money changers, their tables, and their sitting in the temple, and on what account. These exchangers had a profit, called "Kolbon", in every shekel they changed. This "Kolbon" gives the name "Collybistae" for these exchangers in this text. The large gain must amount to a great deal of money. They seemed to work within the frame of law when Christ overturned their table, unless it should be objected, that this was not the time of their sitting, because that happened a few days before the Passover, which was in the month Nisan (the tenth of Nisan, when Christ entered the temple), whereas the half shekel should be paid in the month Adar until the twenty fifth of Adar. Moreover, these men had other business, such as money exchange, especially at such a time as the passover, when persons came from different parts of world to attend it; and might want to exchange their foreign money for current money.

=== Verse 13 ===
And said unto them, It is written, My house shall be called the house of prayer; but ye have made it a den of thieves.

Citing from Isaiah 56:7; Jeremiah 7:11
Cross reference: Mark 11:17; Luke 19:46

== Authority of Jesus questioned (21:23–27) ==
=== Verses 24–27 ===
Jesus ... said to them, “I also will ask you one thing, which if you tell Me, I likewise will tell you by what authority I do these things: the baptism of John — where was it from? From heaven or from men?” And they reasoned among themselves, saying, “If we say, ‘From heaven’, He will say to us, ‘Why then did you not believe him?’ But if we say, ‘From men’, we fear the multitude, for all count John as a prophet”. So they answered Jesus and said, “We do not know.”

Allison notes that "this section is less about Jesus ... or [John] the Baptist than it is about the chief priests and elders, characterising these as (a) less spiritually aware and perceptive than the multitudes over whom they preside, and (b) moral cowards driven by expediency.

== Parable of two sons (21:28–32) ==
Occurring only in Matthew, this parable refers to two sons. Their father asked both of them to work in his vineyard. One of the sons said that he wouldn't do it, but he later changed his mind and did the work anyway. The other son said he would do it, but he didn't go.

== Parable of the Wicked Husbandmen (21:33–46) ==
=== Verse 43 ===
Therefore I say to you, the kingdom of God will be taken from you and given to a nation bearing the fruits of it.

Protestant biblical commentator Heinrich Meyer notes that "Jesus is not here referring to the Gentiles, as, since Eusebius' time, many ... have supposed, but, as the use of the singular already plainly indicates, to the whole of the future subjects of the kingdom of the Messiah, conceived of as one people, which will therefore consist of Jews and Gentiles, [the] new Messianic people of God", the "holy nation" addressed as such in 1 Peter 2:9. The phrase "the fruits of it" means "the fruits of the kingdom".

=== Verses 45–46 ===
^{45} Now when the chief priests and Pharisees heard His parables, they perceived that He was speaking of them. ^{46} But when they sought to lay hands on Him, they feared the multitudes, because they took Him for a prophet.

Chapter 22 opens with the words, "And Jesus answered and spoke to them again ...", suggesting that Matthew's account of the Parable of the Wedding Feast is a response to the "stirrings in the minds" of those who listened to Jesus.

== See also ==
- Bethany and Bethphage on Mount of Olives
- Fig tree
- Parables of Jesus
- Other related Bible parts: Psalm 8, Isaiah 5, Isaiah 56, Jeremiah 7, Zechariah 9, Mark 11, Mark 12, Luke 19, Luke 20, John 2, John 12

== Sources ==
- Allison, Dale C. Jr. (2007). "57. Matthew". In Barton, John; Muddiman, John (eds.). The Oxford Bible Commentary (first (paperback) ed.). Oxford University Press. pp. 844–886. ISBN 978-0199277186.
