= Codex Palatinus =

5th-century Latin Gospel Book

Codex Palatinus is a 5th-century manuscript of the Latin New Testament Gospels written on purple dyed parchment. It is designated by e or 2 in the Beuron register of Latin New Testament manuscripts. The text is a version of the Old Latin New Testament. Most of the manuscript was in the Austrian National Library at Vienna until 1919, when it was transferred to Trent, where it is now being kept in the Library of Buonconsiglio Castle.

Two leaves were separated from the manuscript in the 18th century. One is now in the library of Trinity College, Dublin (shelf number MS 1709), the other in the British Library (shelf number Add. MS 40107) in London.

== Description ==
The manuscript is a codex (precursor to the modern book format), containing the text of the four Gospels written on 230 folios (660 pages) made of vellum (sized 35.5cm x 26cm). Similar formats are to be found with other Latin New Testament codices Vercellensis (a), Veronensis (b), Brixianus (f) Vindobonensis (i), and Purpureus Sarzanensis (j). The text is written in two columns, with 19-20 lines per page in gold and silver ink. It has numerous gaps. The Gospels follow in the so-called "Western" order: Matthew, John, Luke, Mark.

Current manuscript contents
Matthew 12:50-13:23, 33-24:49; 28:3-20
John 1:1-18:11, 26-23:25
Luke 1:1-8:29, 49-11:3, 25-24:53
Mark 1:21-47, 20-6:9; 12:38-9; 13:25-6, 34-35

The Latin text of the codex is basically African recension, but it has been strongly Europeanized. In John 1:34 it reflects ὁ ἐκλεκτός (the chosen) along with manuscripts 𝔓^{5}, 𝔓^{105}, א, b, ff^{2}, syr^{c}, syr^{s}.

== History ==
The earliest history of the manuscript is unknown. It was likely produced in north Italy in the 5th century CE. It was acquired from Trent between 1800 and 1829. It was edited by biblical scholar Constantin von Tischendorf (published in Evangelicum Palatinum ineditum, Leipzig 1847), biblical scholar Johannes Belsheim, and Jülicher. It is currently housed in the Library of Buonconsiglio Castle (shelf number Ms 1589).

== See also ==
- List of New Testament Latin manuscripts
- Purple parchment
