= Codex Purpureus Sarzanensis =

Latin Gospel Book

The Codex Sarzanensis, or Codex Saretianus, designated by j or 22 (in Beuron system), is a 5th or 6th century Latin Gospel Book. The text, written on purple dyed vellum in silver ink (as are codices a b e f i), is a version of the old Latin.

Dated by paleographists to the beginning of the 6th century, the manuscript is formed by 72 sheep leather scrolls with parts in gold (or silver) characters, and precious miniatures realized in Tyrian purple dye, firstly scanned as a whole in 2018.

The best conserved sections contain Luke 24 and 292 verses of John (1:38-3:23; 3:33-5:20; 6:29-49.49-67; 6:68-7:32; 8:6-9:21), written two columns on a page, in round letters. John 18:36-20:14 was written by another hand. It has numerous lacunae.

The manuscript was discovered in 1872 in the Church of Sarezzano, near Tortona. It was edited by librarian of the Ambrosian Library in 1872 at Milan (2nd edition, 1885). It was edited by Jülicher.

The codex is no longer housed at the Church of Saints Ruffino & Venanzio at Sarezzano, but is kept and displayed at the nearby Museo Diocesano d'Arte Sacra di Tortona ("Tortona Diocesan Museum of Sacred Art"), in Tortona, Alessandria Province. Only a few pages of the text are displayed at any given time given the delicate nature of the text and the bulk of the work is deposited at a nearby bank under preservative conditions.

Accompanying the text at the museum are items which were discovered with the text upon its removal from the which include the remains of a previous leather binding of the text with holes in the shape of a cross which at one point may have held precious stones and cover of a wooden box which held the book, beautifully painted with a portrait of St. Ruffino.

The museum can be visited by appointment for a small donation.

== See also ==
- List of New Testament Latin manuscripts
- Purple parchment
