= Codex Vindobonensis Lat. 502 =

7th-century Latin Gospel Book

Codex Vindobonensis Lat. 502 is a fragmentary parchment manuscript of the Latin New Testament. It survives as one folio containing only John 19:27-20:11, in the Old Latin form. It is designated by VL 25 or v in the Beuron register of Latin New Testament manuscripts. It is part of a number of manuscripts listed under the Fragmentum Vindobonense. Using the study of comparative writing styles (palaeography), it is assigned to the 6th or 7th century CE.

== Description ==
The manuscript is likely from a codex (precursor to the modern book format), containing at least the Gospel of John of which only 1 folio survives (sized 23.5 cm by 16.5 cm), witnessing to John 19:27-20:11. The text is written in two columns, 30 lines per page using black ink. The writing is much faded. It is entitled "Pactus legis Ripuarie". The Latin text of the codex is a representative of the Western text-type in itala recension.

== History ==
The earliest history of the manuscript is unknown. It was copied in either North Italy or France during the 6th or 7th century CE. The text was transcribed and published by Henry Julian White in 1887. Its readings are cited in the Vetus Latina publications as v, and in the Oxford Vulgate also as v.

It was named Vindobonensis after Vienna, the place of its housing. It is currently housed in the Austrian National Library (shelf number Lat. 502) in Vienna.

== See also ==
- List of New Testament Latin manuscripts
- Biblical manuscript
- Codex Vindobonensis Lat. 1235
