= Godescalc Evangelistary =

Illuminated manuscript from the 8th century

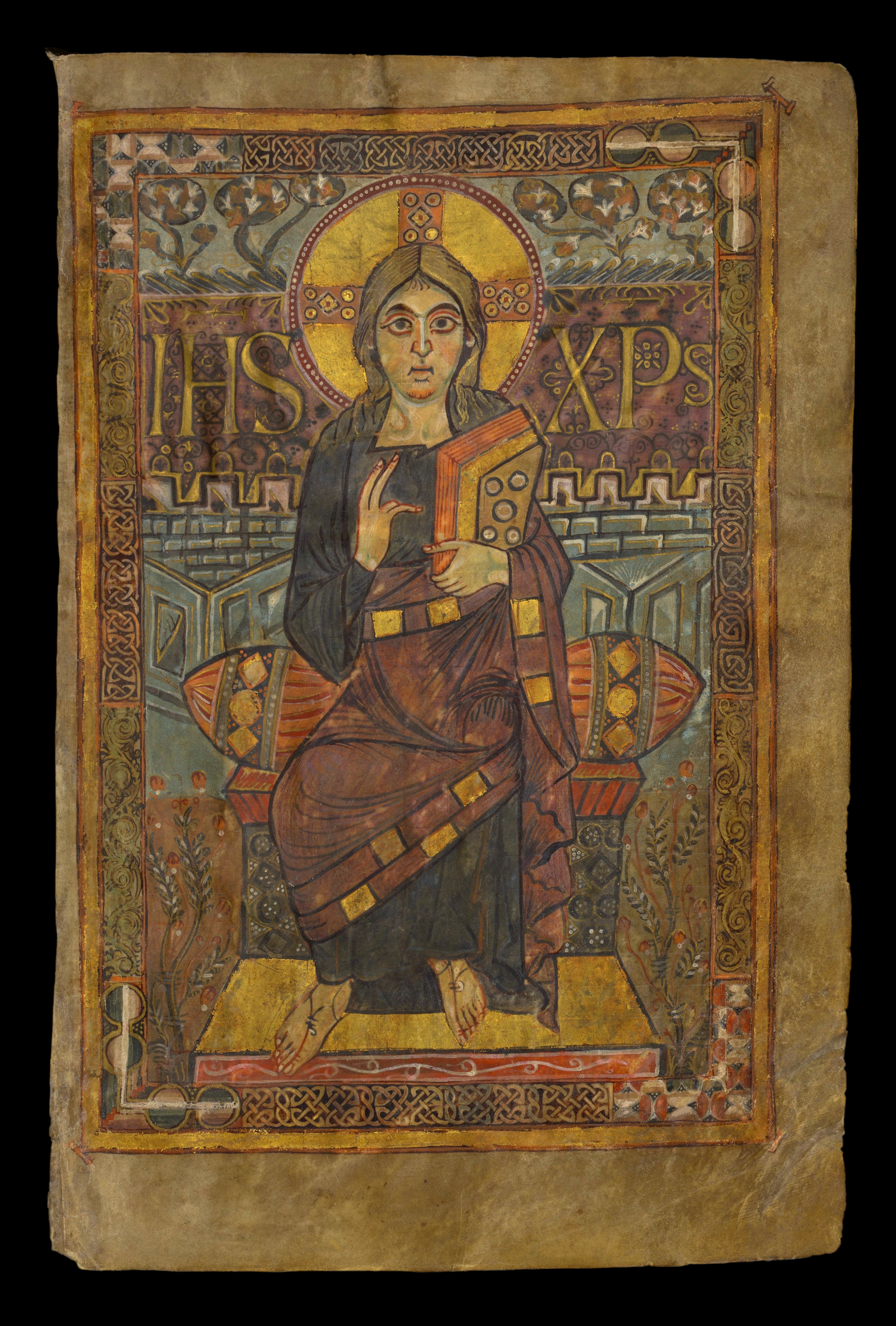
The Christ in Majesty miniature

The Godescalc Evangelistary, Godescalc Sacramentary, Godescalc Gospels, or Godescalc Gospel Lectionary (Paris, BNF. acquisitions nouvelles lat.1203) is an illuminated manuscript in Latin made by the Frankish scribe Godescalc and today kept in the Bibliothèque nationale de France. It was commissioned by the Carolingian king Charlemagne and his wife Hildegard on October 7, 781 and completed on April 30, 783. The Evangelistary is the earliest known manuscript produced at the scriptorium in Charlemagne's Court School in Aachen. The manuscript was intended to commemorate Charlemagne's march to Italy, his meeting with Pope Adrian I, and the baptism of his son Pepin. The crediting of the work to Godescalc and the details of Charlemagne's march are contained in the manuscript's dedication poem.

== Description ==
The manuscript, a product of the Carolingian Renaissance, is the earliest example of a Carolingian illumination style. This style was characterized by naturalist motifs in the decoration, and a fusion of Insular Anglo-Saxon/Irish, early Christian (late Classical) and Byzantine styles. The ornamental motifs on the opening page of each Gospel rely heavily on the interlaces of Hiberno-Saxon origin. The portraits of the Evangelists and Christ are based on Byzantine models, such as the mosaics of San Vitale at Ravenna. The artist used natural illusionistic techniques to create the appearance of volume in the characters, and used elaborate shadings in light and dark to give characters depth. The Carolingian illumination style was the earliest style to regularly utilize Caroline minuscule script, the precursor to our modern lower case letters. The Godescalc Evangelistary is illuminated in the same style as the Dagulf Psalter. Both manuscripts seem to belong in a group of works known as the “Ada School” or Court School of Charlemagne.

== Contents ==
The Godescalc Evangelistary outlines prayer services and contains selections from the Gospels designed to be read at Mass through the liturgical year. The content of the Godescalc Evangelistary is a reminder of Charlemagne's intention to renew culture of the past rather than to create a new one. There was a movement to correct Psalters, Gospel books, and other works to provide easier understanding of texts that had become unclear over time. The Godescalc Evangelistary is written in gold and silver ink on purple vellum in uncial characters except the dedication, which is written in Carolingian minuscule. The codex is decorated by six miniature figures. The first four are Evangelist portraits, of the authors of the Gospels. The fifth is a Christ in Majesty. The sixth image is of the Fountain of Life, or fons vitae.

== Miniatures ==
=== The Four Evangelists ===
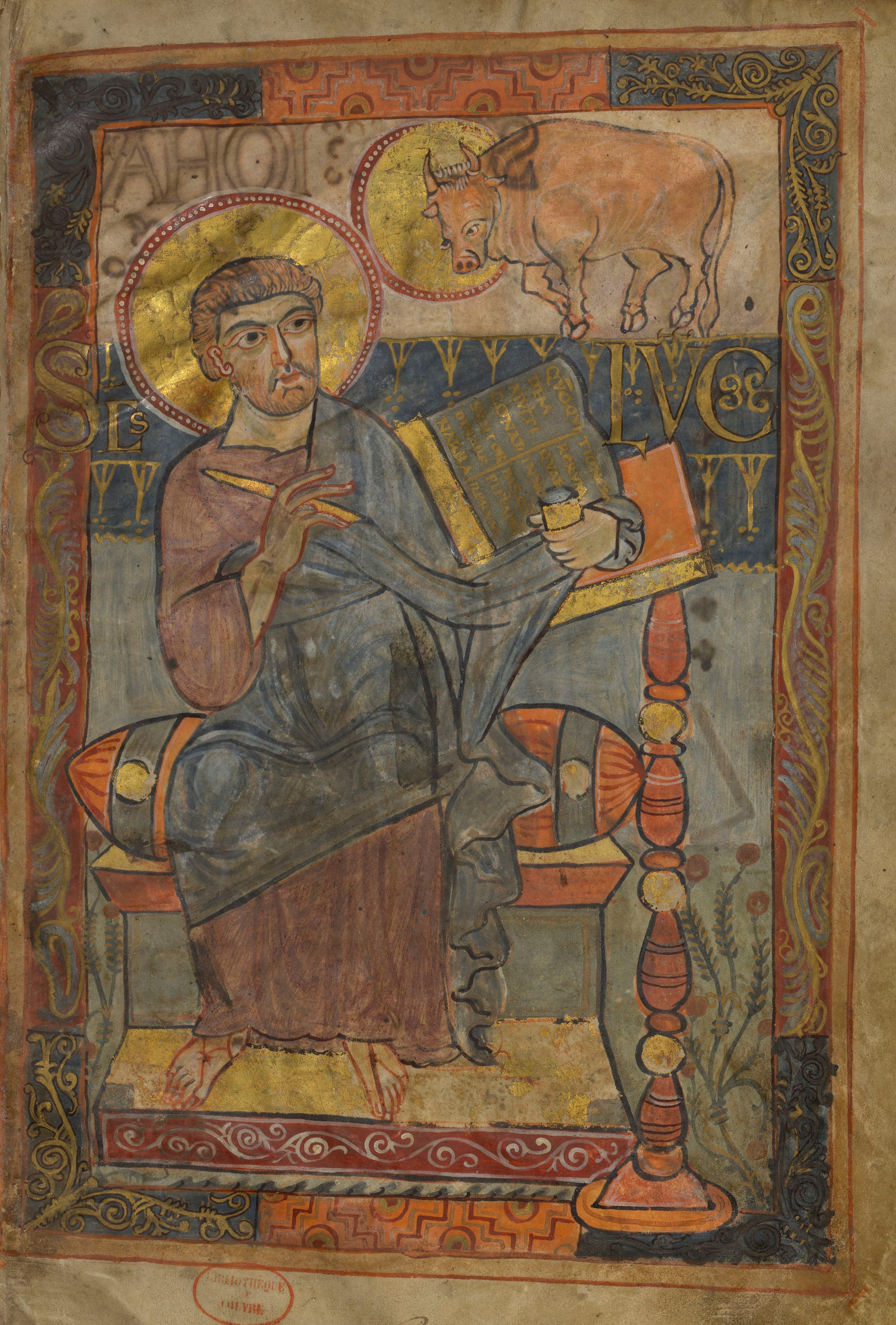
Illumination of St. Luke with his symbol, the ox. He is one of the four Evangelists featured in the Godescalc Evangelistary.

Like other gospel books, the Godescalc Evangelistary includes portraits of the four Evangelists. The number of Evangelists was settled c. 200 when Irenaeus, Bishop of Lyons in Gaul decreed that the four Gospels, Matthew, Mark, Luke, and John, were the Canonical Gospels. The four Evangelists’ accounts were said to “tell the same, doctrinally correct story.” They are all pictured with their respective emblems in the miniatures. Each portrait features one of the Evangelists with a stylus and a book. This is symbolic of the power of God and gives the religious message a scholarly context. Through this presentation, the miniatures present the elevated value of learning which Charlemagne wished to convey through his campaign to reform education. Furthermore, all four Evangelists are looking up, away from their books. This is an “iconographic motif” indicating inspiration. This motif links the Godescalc figures to those of the Egino Codex, an example of the last remains of Lombard luxury art obtained in 774 with the conquering of the kingdom of the Lombards.

=== Christ in Majesty ===
The miniature of Christ in Majesty depicts a young Jesus Christ holding a book in his left arm and making the sign of a blessing with his right. The golden words etched behind Christ are strongly linked to the following text in the Evangelistary about Christ's life which includes the same words. Christ in Majesty was probably based on a famous painting known as the Acheropita, located in the Lateran Basilica in Rome. This is the same Lateran where Pope Adrian I baptized Charlemagne's son, Pepin. In its treatment of form, the miniature is elongated between shoulders and hip. This shows possible influence from the style of the icon of the Virgin crowned as Queen (also known as Queen of Heaven); located in the Santa Maria in Trastevere, executed for Pope John VII (705-707). The round face and the large eyes of the youthful Christ recall the image of the Virgin in the Mount Sinai icon.

=== St. John the Evangelist facing Christ in Majesty ===
St. John is given special status mainly because his portrait is placed on the same opening as that of Christ in Majesty (St. John the Evangelist on the left and Christ in Majesty on the right). The two images present notable contrasts. Jesus sits on a cushioned bench whereas St. John is seated on a throne-like chair. The throne is traditionally regarded as a representation of the four Evangelists but it represents another layer of meaning in these images. The throne is also a representation of Charlemagne. Thus, St. John seated on a throne facing the image of Jesus Christ is a display of imperial authority presiding over Church. St. John is presented with a stylus that he is dipping in ink and pages which he will write on. Christ merely holds a closed book to his breast. The suggestion is that in Christ's life, he adds little creative content and does his job of conveying the message written by the Evangelists.

=== The Fountain of Life, fons vitae ===
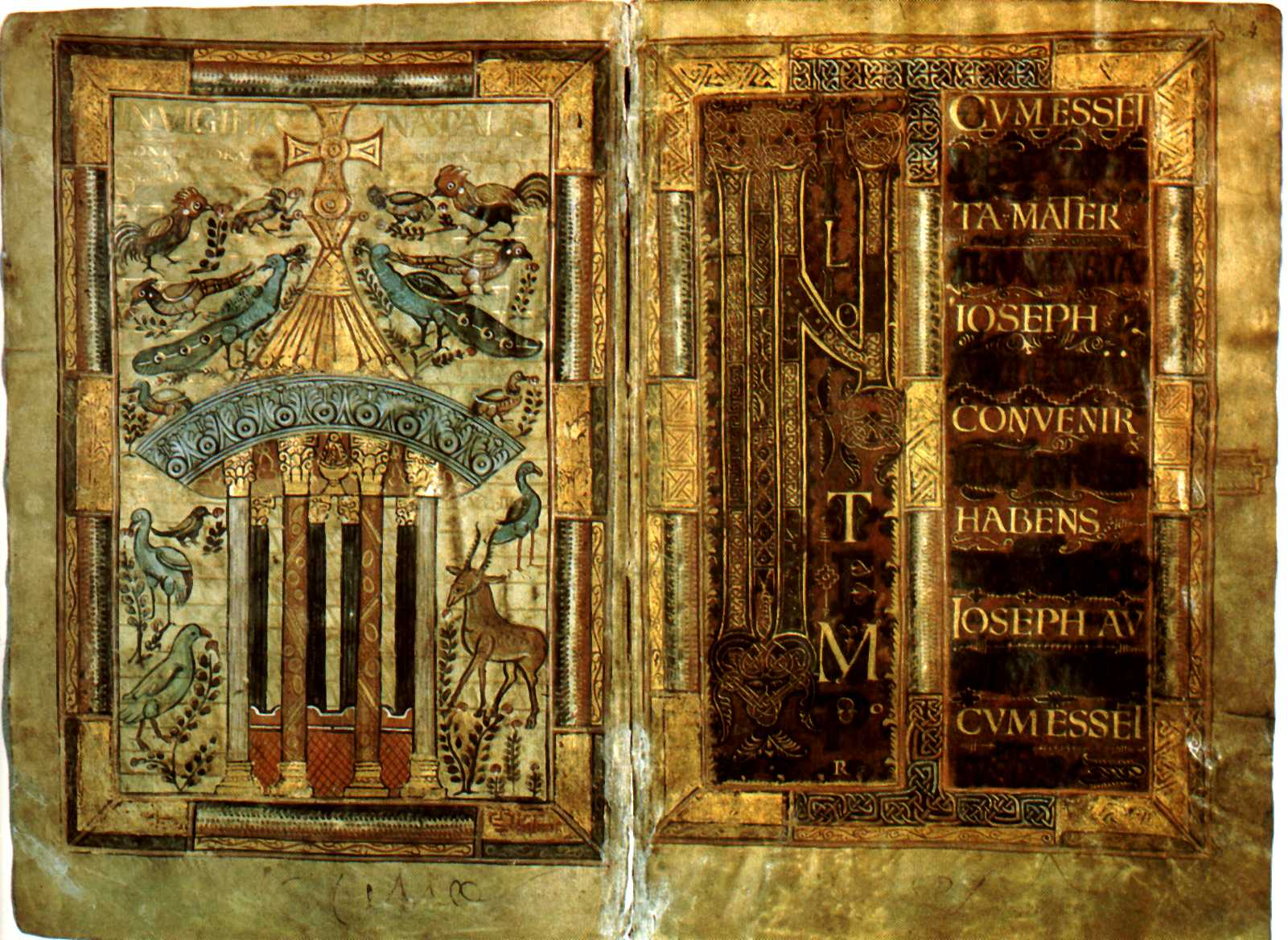
The Fountain of Life (left), commemorating the baptism of Charlemagne's son Pepin faced by the Initial page to the Vigil for Christmas (right).

The origin of the image of the Fountain of Life is much older than the Godescalc Evangelistary. Earlier examples come from Eastern manuscripts, where the fons vitae was a symbol of the Gospels as “the font of eternal life”. The meaning was modified in the Evangelistary and because of its placement and heading; the miniature refers to Christ's birth as the Fountain of Life. The Fountain of Life takes up a full page in the Evangelistary and is significantly located on the verso with Christ in a garden. The miniature contains a depiction of a shrine that is topped by a cross. The shrine's circular form with a conical roof is a reference to the Holy Sepulcher from the Crucifixion miniature in the Rabula Gospels. The shrine is a lively representation of the baptistery of the Lateran church in Rome. The heavenly image of the birds and plants employs the fountain “as the source of the four rivers of paradise”, which evokes the four Gospels. The peacocks are a symbol of immortality and the birds around them are waterfowls. The waterfowls are identified in Eastern theological commentaries as “symbols of the apostles—“fishers of men”— who look back at the cocks symbolizing the Old Testament prophets in whose sayings the coming of Christ was foretold.” The deer is a hart, an animal traditionally linked to the baptismal ritual from the passage in Psalm 42:1 (quoted below from the King James Version). It is symbolic of humanity thirsting for salvation.

As the hart panteth after the water brooks, so panteth my soul after thee, O God.

On the facing page to the Fountain of Life lies the Initial Page to the Vigil for Christmas. Presented in contrast to each other, the Fountain of Life offers colorful images while the lines of the periscope of the Vigil of Nativity provide a beautiful image of silver(now oxidized to black) and golden letters on a purple background, reading In illo tempore (Matt. 1:18-21). The golden letters and the golden words show a promise of a golden kingdom. Precious materials like gold were believed to be gifts of God in the Middle Ages and Godescalc uses golden letters in his poem to emulate eternal life. The image of the Fountain of Life and the gold script on the facing page show the perceptions of eternal life in the Carolingian kingdom.

== Text and script ==
The manuscript was written in gold and silver ink on 127 pages of purple parchment. Godescalc described his book in a dedication poem at the end of the Evangelistary:

Golden words are painted [here] on purple pages,
The Thunderer’s shining kingdoms of the starry heavens,
Revealed in rose-red blood, disclose the joys of heaven,
And the eloquence of God glittering with fitting brilliance
Promises the splendid rewards of martyrdom to be gained.

The gold and silver letters Godescalc uses show that the image of the letters is as important as the message they display. Silver and gold are long-lasting metals and their longevity is a reflection of the idea of an “image of the incarnate God”. The idea of words being as important as their physical depiction is rooted in John 1:1 where Saint John describes Christ as the Word. Hence, the iconography of Gospel books elaborated on the relationship between their physical grandeur and spiritual content.

The manuscript is a key component in the reform of handwriting as it is the first to contain the new Carolingian minuscule script which became a fundamental theme in Carolingian book production thereafter.

== Purpose ==
The Godescalc Evangelistary was an important part of Charlemagne's educational and ecclesiastical reforms. The manuscript was a preliminary attempt to standardize language in the Carolingian kingdom and this cultural achievement of replacing the Merovingian script was lasting. The Carolingian minuscule was so successful that after the year 800, most of France had adopted the new way of writing. Although the Evangelistary is named after Godescalc, the production involved a team of writers, editors, Godescalc himself (who was a poet and scribe), parchment makers, an illuminator, a painter, and a book binder. Godescalc began a trend of luxuriously decorated Bible manuscripts in the Carolingian world. His Evangelistary was a richly decorated work worthy of matching the desires of the commissioning monarch. The Evangelistary offered not only a new alternative for illuminators and scribes of the Carolingian era, but a form of writing that would be adopted and stay in effect until today.
