= Uncial 0272 =

- New Testament manuscript
- Text: Luke 16-17 †; 19 †
- Date: 9th century
- Script: Greek
- Now at: British Library
- Size: 33 x 26 cm
- Type: Byzantine text-type
- Category: V

Uncial 0272 (in the Gregory-Aland numbering), is a Greek uncial manuscript of the New Testament. Paleographically it has been assigned to the 9th century.

== Description ==
The codex contains a small parts of the Gospel of Luke, on 3 parchment leaves (33 cm by 26 cm). It is written in two columns per page, 25 lines per page, in uncial letters. It is a palimpsest, the upper text contains menaeon in Greek. Formerly it was included together with Uncial 0271 and Uncial 0273 in Uncial 0133 (because of similarities).

Currently it is dated by the INTF to the 9th century.

== Contents ==
The codex contains: Gospel of Luke 16:21-17:3(?).19-35(?); 19:15-31(?). The text is not always legible.

== Text ==
The Greek text of this codex is a representative of the Byzantine text-type. Aland placed it in Category V.

== Location ==
The codex is currently housed at the British Library (Add MS 31919, ff. 21, 98, 101) in London.

== See also ==
- List of New Testament uncials
- Textual criticism
