= Uncial 0120 =

- New Testament manuscript
- Name: Vaticanus Gr. 2302
- Text: Acts of the Apostles 16–18
- Date: 9th-century
- Script: Greek
- Now at: Vatican Library
- Size: 27 cm by 19 cm
- Type: mixed
- Category: III

Uncial 0120 (in the Gregory-Aland numbering), α 1005 (Soden), is a Greek uncial manuscript of the New Testament, dated palaeographically to the 9th-century. Vaya lokosñ

== Description ==
The codex contains a small parts of the Acts of the Apostles 16:30-17:17; 17:27-29,31-34; 18:8-26, on six parchment leaves (27 cm by 19 cm). The text is written in one column per page, 21 lines per page, in uncial letters. The letters are leaned into right. It has breathings and accents; errors of itacism occurs (υ and ι, η and ει, ο and ω, αι and ε). It contains the τιτλοι (titles) at the top of the pages.

It is a palimpsest, the upper text is a menaeon (see Uncial 094, Uncial 0133).

The Greek text of this codex is a mixture of the text-types. Aland placed it in Category III.

== History ==
Currently it is dated by the INTF to the 9th-century.

Five leaves of this codex were published by Giuseppe Cozza in 1877 at Rome, the 6th leaf was published by Gregory in 1909 at Leipzig.

The codex now is located in the Vatican Library (Gr. 2302) in Rome.

== See also ==
- List of New Testament uncials
- Textual criticism
