= Uncial 0133 =

- New Testament manuscript
- Name: Codex Blenheimius
- Text: Matthew †; Mark †
- Date: 9th century
- Script: Greek
- Found: Abbott 1881
- Now at: British Library
- Size: 33 x 26 cm
- Type: Byzantine text-type
- Category: V

Uncial 0133 (in the Gregory-Aland numbering), ε 83 (Soden), is a Greek uncial manuscript of the New Testament, dated paleographically to the 9th century. Formerly it was labelled by W^{g}.

== Description ==
The codex contains a parts of the Matthew 1:1-14; 5:3-19; 23:9-25:30; 25:43-26:26; 26:50-27:16; Mark 1:1-43; 2:21-5:1; 5:29-6:22; 10:51-11:13, on 29 parchment leaves (33 cm by 26 cm). The text is written in two columns per page, 20 lines per page, in large uncial letters.

It contains numbers of the κεφαλαια (chapters), τιτλοι (titles), the Ammonian Sections (not Eusebian Canons). It is very hard to read.

It is a palimpsest, the upper text is a menaeon (see Uncial 094, Uncial 0120). Formerly to this codex were included Uncial 0271, 0272 and 0273 (because of similarities).

The Greek text of this codex is a representative of the Byzantine text-type. Aland placed it in Category V.

In Matthew 5:11 οι ανθρωποι along with g^{1}, q, vg^{s}, syr^{s,c}; it has also additional ρημα (as C, W, Θ, 0196).

In Matthew 26:7 – βαρυτιμου along with B, W, 089, 0255, f^{1}, f^{13}, Byz; the other manuscripts read πολυτιμου (Sinaiticus, Alexandrinus, Bezae, Regius, Koridethi, 33, 565, 892, 1010 1424).

== History ==
Currently it is dated by the INTF to the 9th century.

The text of menaion was written by Archbishop of Selymeria in 1431. The manuscript was discovered in 1881 by Abbott and Mahaffy in Blenheim Palace. Gregory in 1883 found two leaves more.

Puttick bought it in 1882 for the British Museum.

The codex is located now at the British Library (Add MS 31919) in London.

== See also ==
- List of New Testament uncials
- Textual criticism
- Uncial 0269
