= Uncial 0255 =

- New Testament manuscript
- Text: Matthew 26:2-9; 27:9-16
- Date: 9th century
- Script: Greek
- Now at: Qubbat al-Khazna
- Size: 15 x 10 cm
- Type: Byzantine text-type
- Category: V

Uncial 0255 (in the Gregory-Aland numbering), is a Greek uncial manuscript of the New Testament. Palaeographically it has been assigned to the 9th century.

== Description ==
The codex contains two small parts of the Gospel of Matthew 26:2-9; 27:9-16, on two parchment leaves (15 cm by 10 cm). The text is written in one column per page, 24 lines per page, in uncial letters.

Currently it is dated by the INTF to the 9th century.

== Location ==
Formerly the codex was held at the Qubbat al-Khazna in Damascus. The present location of the codex is unknown. Currently the manuscript is not accessible.

== Text ==
The Greek text of this codex is a representative of the Byzantine text-type. Aland placed it in Category V.

In Matthew 26:7 – βαρυτιμου along with B, W, 089, 0133, f^{1}, f^{13}, Byz; the other manuscripts read πολυτιμου (Sinaiticus, Alexandrinus, Bezae, Regius, Koridethi, 33, 565, 892, 1010, and 1424).

== See also ==
- List of New Testament uncials
- Textual criticism
