= Uncial 0269 =

- New Testament manuscript
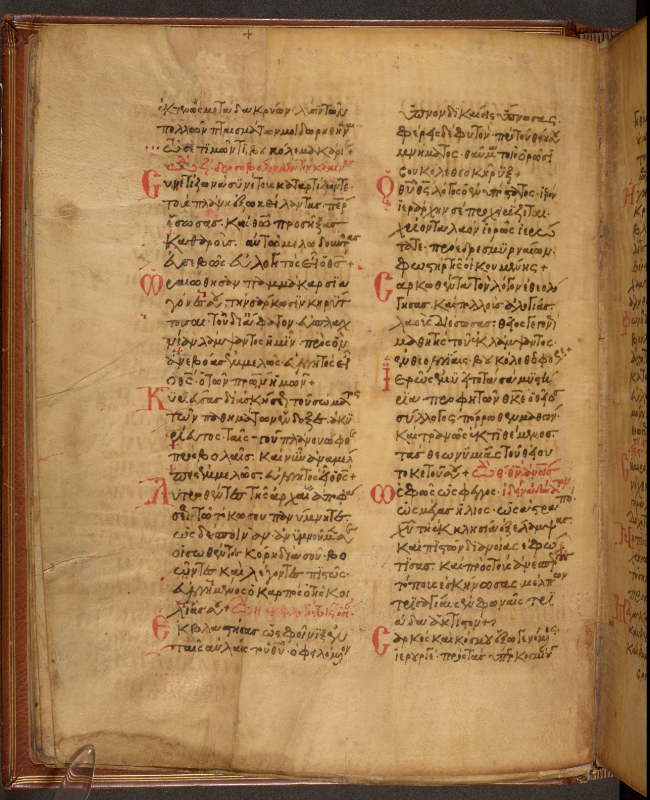
- Text: Mark 6:14-20
- Date: 9th century
- Script: Greek
- Now at: British Library
- Size: 33 x 25 cm
- Type: mixed / Byzantine
- Category: III / V

Uncial 0269 (in the Gregory-Aland numbering), ε 83 (Soden), is a Greek uncial manuscript of the New Testament. Paleographically it has been assigned to the 9th century.

== Description ==
The codex contains a small part of the Gospel of Mark 6:14-20, on one parchment leaf (33 cm by 25 cm). The text is written in two columns per page, 25 lines per page, in uncial letters. It is a palimpsest, the upper text contains menaion.

Currently it is dated by the INTF to the 9th century.

== Location ==
Currently the codex is housed at the British Library (Add. 31919, f. 23) in London.

== Text ==
The Greek text of this codex is mixed with predominate the Byzantine element. Aland placed it in Category III.

== See also ==
- List of New Testament uncials
- Textual criticism
- Uncial 0133
