= Parable of the Workers in the Vineyard =

Parable of Jesus (Matthew 20 1–16)

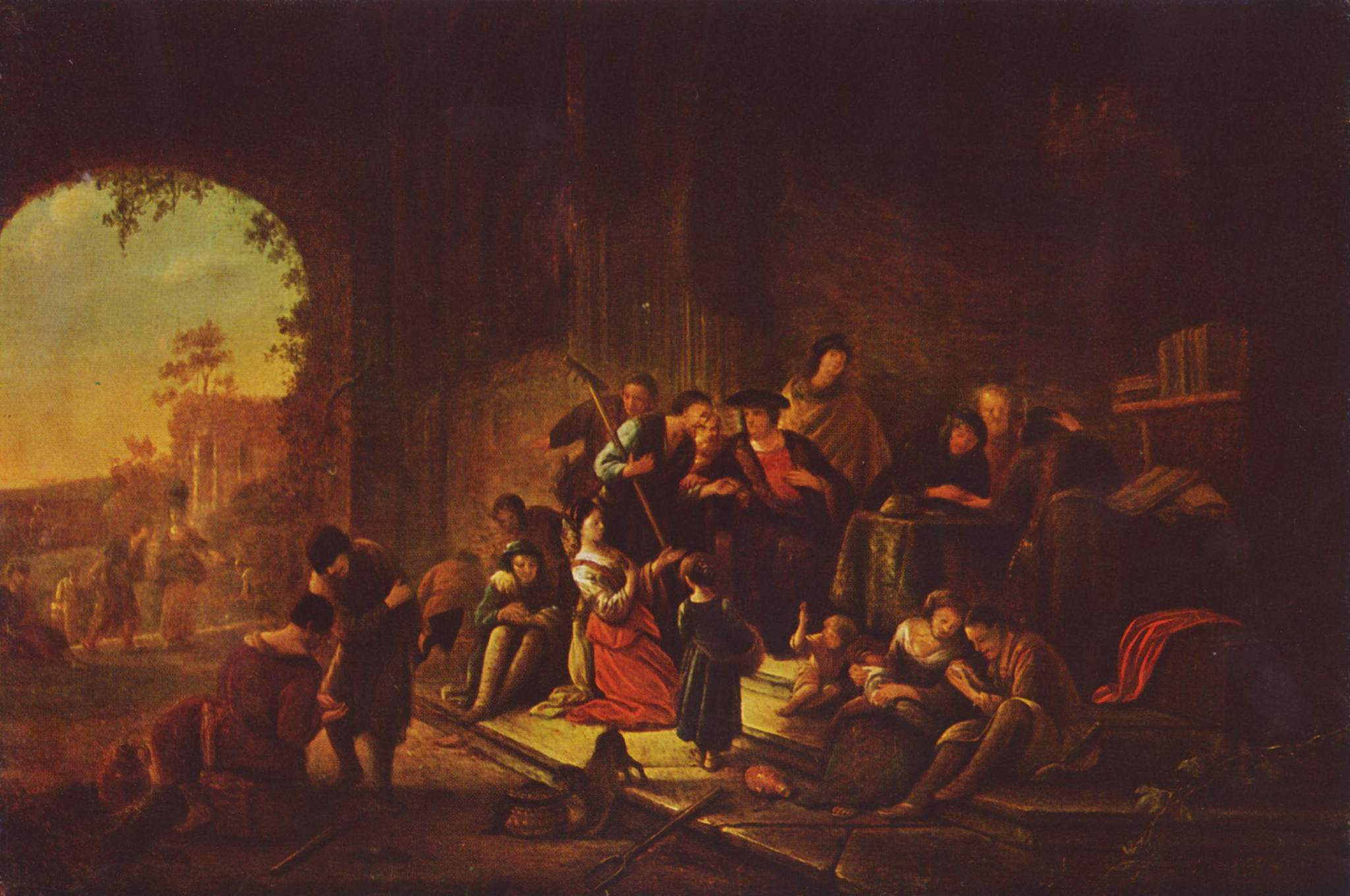
Painting of the parable, by Jacob Willemszoon de Wet, mid-17th century

The Parable of the Workers in the Vineyard (also called the Parable of the Laborers in the Vineyard or the Parable of the Generous Employer) is a parable of Jesus which appears in chapter 20 of the Gospel of Matthew in the New Testament. It is not included in the other canonical gospels. It has been described as a difficult parable to interpret.

== Text ==
“For the kingdom of heaven is like a landowner who went out early in the morning to hire laborers for his vineyard. After agreeing with the laborers for a denarius for the day, he sent them into his vineyard. When he went out about nine o’clock, he saw others standing idle in the marketplace, and he said to them, ‘You also go into the vineyard, and I will pay you whatever is right.’ So they went. When he went out again about noon and about three o’clock, he did the same. And about five o’clock he went out and found others standing around, and he said to them, ‘Why are you standing here idle all day?’ They said to him, ‘Because no one has hired us.’ He said to them, ‘You also go into the vineyard.’ When evening came, the owner of the vineyard said to his manager, ‘Call the laborers and give them their pay, beginning with the last and then going to the first.’ When those hired about five o’clock came, each of them received a denarius. Now when the first came, they thought they would receive more; but each of them also received a denarius. And when they received it, they grumbled against the landowner, saying, ‘These last worked only one hour, and you have made them equal to us who have borne the burden of the day and the scorching heat.’ But he replied to one of them, ‘Friend, I am doing you no wrong; did you not agree with me for a denarius? Take what belongs to you and go; I choose to give to this last the same as I give to you. Am I not allowed to do what I choose with what belongs to me? Or are you envious because I am generous?’ So the last will be first, and the first will be last.”

— Matthew 20:1–16, New Revised Standard Version

== Interpretations ==
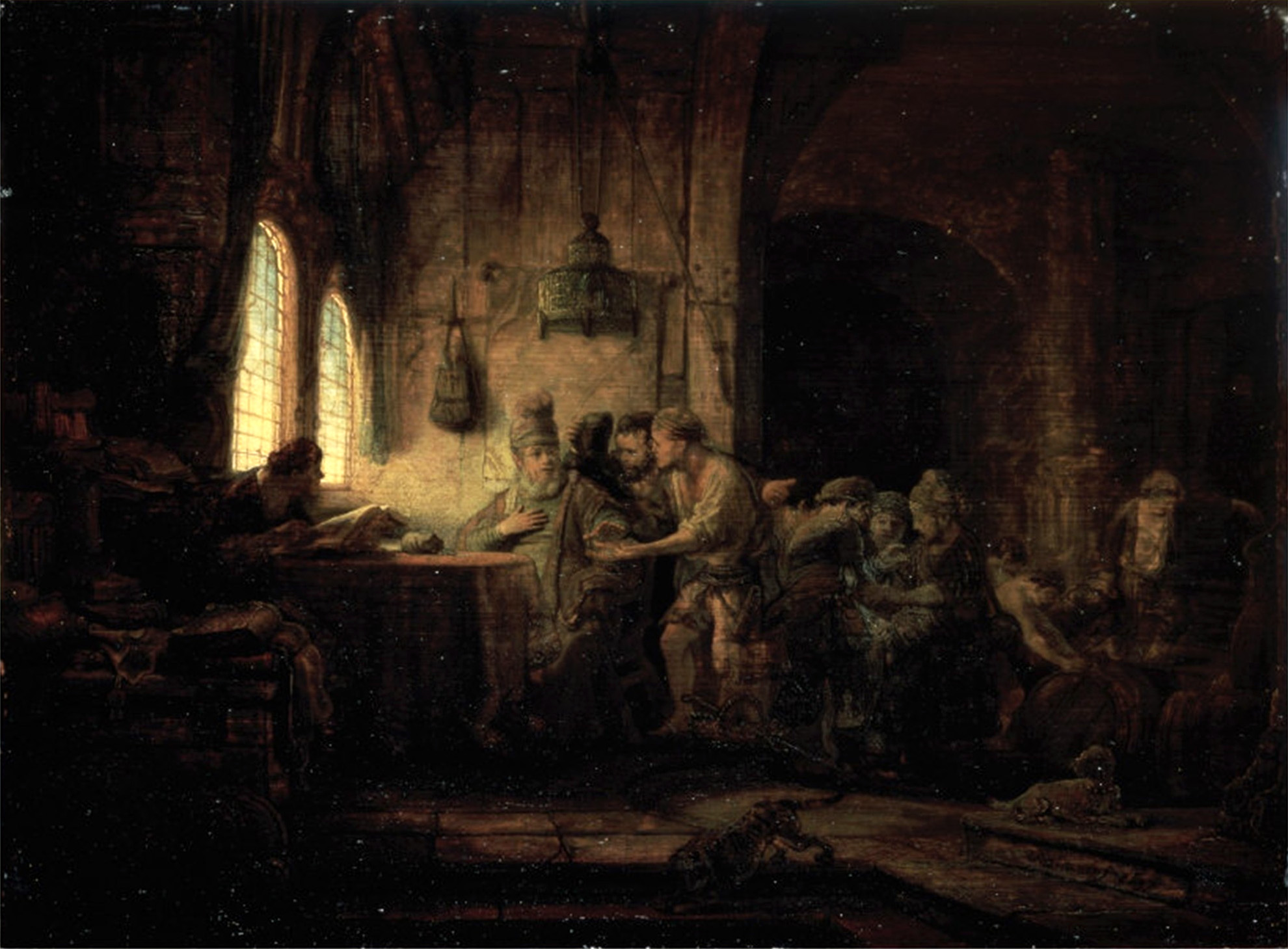
Painting of the parable by Rembrandt, showing the workers being paid that evening (1637)

The parable has often been interpreted to mean that even those who are converted late in life earn equal rewards along with those converted early, and also that people who convert early in life need not feel jealous of those later converts. An alternative interpretation identifies the early laborers as Jews, some of whom resent the late-comers (Gentiles) being welcomed as equals in God's Kingdom. Both of these interpretations are discussed in Matthew Henry's 1706 Commentary on the Bible.

An alternative interpretation is that all Christians can be identified with the eleventh-hour workers. Arland J. Hultgren writes: "While interpreting and applying this parable, the question inevitably arises: Who are the eleventh-hour workers in our day? We might want to name them, such as deathbed converts or persons who are typically despised by those who are longtime veterans and more fervent in their religious commitment. But it is best not to narrow the field too quickly. At a deeper level, we are all the eleventh-hour workers; to change the metaphor, we are all honored guests of God in the kingdom. It is not really necessary to decide who the eleventh-hour workers are. The point of the parable—both at the level of Jesus and the level of Matthew's Gospel—is that God saves by grace, not by our worthiness. That applies to all of us."

A USCCB interpretation is that the parable's "close association with Mt 19:30 suggests that its teaching is the equality of all the disciples in the reward of inheriting eternal life." The USCCB interpret Mt 19:30 as: "[A]ll who respond to the call of Jesus, at whatever time (first or last), will be the same in respect to inheriting the benefits of the kingdom, which is the gift of God." In giving himself via the beatific vision, God is the greatest reward.

Some commentators have used the parable to justify the principle of a "living wage", though generally conceding that this is not the main point of the parable. An example is John Ruskin in the 19th century, who quoted the parable in the title of his book Unto This Last (1860). Ruskin did not discuss the religious meaning of the parable but rather its social and economic implications.

In Islam, there is a report of a similar parable in which the three groups appear interpreted to be the Jews, Christians, and Muslims in that order.

== Parallels ==
Many details of the parable, including when the workers receive their pay at the end of the day, the complaints from those who worked a full day, and the response from the king/landowner are paralleled in a similar parable found in tractate Berakhot in the Jerusalem Talmud:

To what can Rebbi Bun bar Ḥiyya be likened? To a king who hired many workers and there was one worker who was exceptionally productive in his work. What did the king do? He took him and walked with him the long and the short. In the evening, the workers came to receive their wages and he gave him his total wages with them. The workers complained and said: we were toiling the entire day and this one did toil only for two hours and he gave him his total wages with us! The king told them: This one produced in two hours more than what you produced all day long. So Rebbi Bun produced in Torah in 28 years what an outstanding Or, with the Arabic ותֹיק “constant, resolute”. student cannot learn in a hundred years. (Jerusalem Berakhot 2.8)

Rabbi [Judah the Prince] wept and said, “There is he acquiring his eternity in one hour, and there is he acquiring his eternity after many years.” (TB, ‘Abodah Zarah 10b)

== See also ==
- Life of Jesus in the New Testament
- Ministry of Jesus
- Equality of outcome
