= Uncial 094 =

- New Testament manuscript
- Text: Matthew 24 †
- Date: 6th-century
- Script: Greek
- Found: Saloniki 1890
- Now at: National Library of Greece
- Size: 30 x 24 cm
- Type: Alexandrian text-type
- Category: II

Uncial 094 (in the Gregory-Aland numbering), ε 016 (Soden); is a Greek uncial manuscript of the New Testament, dated paleographically to the 6th-century.

== Description ==
The codex contains only a small part of the Gospel of Matthew 24:9-21, on one parchment leaf (30 cm by 24 cm). The text is written in two columns per page, 20 lines per page, in a large uncial letters. It is a palimpsest. The upper text is in Greek. It contains menaeon (see Uncial 0120, Uncial 0133).

The Greek text of this codex is a representative of the Alexandrian text-type. Aland placed it in Category II.

Currently it is dated by the INTF to the 6th-century.

It was discovered in Saloniki.

Currently the codex is housed at the Εθνική Βιβλιοθήκη (Or. 2106) at Athens.

== See also ==
- List of New Testament uncials
- Textual criticism
