= Codex Turicensis =

7th-century Greek manuscript of the Psalter

Codex Turicensis (T, Zurich, Municipal Library) is a 7th-century manuscript of the Psalter in Greek.

It contained originally 288 leaves; of these 223 remain. The text is written on purple dyed vellum in silver, gold or vermilion ink.

Like the Codex Veronensis (R) this manuscript is of Western origin. It was intended for Western use, as appears from the renderings of the Latin (Gallican) version which have been copied into the margins by a contemporary hand, and also from the liturgical divisions of the Psalter. The archetype, however, was a Psalter written for use in the East—a fact which is revealed by the survival in the copy of occasional traces of the Greek στάσεις

Konstantin von Tischendorf, who published the text in the fourth volume of his Nova Collectio (1869), ascribes the handwriting to the seventh century.

The text of the Codex Turicensis agrees generally with that of the Codex Alexandrinus (A), and still more closely with the hand in Codex Sinaiticus (S, א).

The characters are written in silver, gold, or vermilion, according to where they belong to the body of the text, the headings and initial letters of the Psalms, or the marginal Latin readings.

The text now begins at Ps. 36. (37.) 1, and there are lacunae in the body of the manuscript which involves the loss of Pss. 30. 2—36. 20, 41. 6—43. 3, 48. 24—59. 3, 59. 9—10, 13—60. 1, 64. 12—71. 4, 92. 3—93. 7, 96. 12—97. 8.

The first five Canticles and a part of the sixth have also disappeared; those which remain are 1 Regn. 2. 6—10 (the rest of the sixth), the Magnificat, Isa. 38. 10—20, the Prayer of Manasses 378, Dan. 3. 23 ff., Benedictus, Nunc Dimittis.

The manuscript is held at Zurich, Zentralbibliothek, Siglum RP 1 or C 84.

== Text ==
- Konstantin von Tischendorf, Monumenta sacra inedita. Nova collectio 4 (1869), p. 1-209

== See also ==
- Septuagint manuscripts
