= Uncial 080 =

Greek manuscript of the New Testament

- New Testament manuscript
- Text: Mark 9-10 †
- Date: 6th century
- Script: Greek
- Now at: Russian National Library; Greek Orthodox Patriarchate
- Type: unknown
- Category: none

Uncial 080 (in the Gregory-Aland numbering), ε 20 (Soden), is a Greek uncial manuscript of the New Testament, dated paleographically to the 6th century.

== Description ==
The codex contains a small part of the Gospel of Mark 9:14-18.20-22; 10:23-24.29, on two purple parchment leaves. Size of the leaves is unknown because of their fragmentary condition. It is written in two columns per page, 18 lines per page, in large uncial letters, in gold. The uncial letters are similar to the Codex Petropolitanus Purpureus.

Currently it is dated by the INTF to the 6th century.

Porphyrius Uspensky saw this codex in 1850 and described it. Oscar von Gebhardt made another description of the codex.

One leaf of the codex is located now at the Russian National Library (Gr. 275, 3) in Saint Petersburg, and one leaf in Alexandria (Greek Orthodox Patriarchate 496).

The Greek text of this codex is too brief to certainly classify its text-type. Kurt Aland did not place it to any Category of New Testament manuscripts.

== See also ==
- List of New Testament uncials
- Purple parchment
- Textual criticism
