= Uncial 0271 =

- New Testament manuscript
- Text: Matthew 12:27-39
- Date: 9th century
- Script: Greek
- Now at: British Library
- Size: 33 x 26 cm
- Type: Alexandrian text-type
- Category: II

Uncial 0271 (in the Gregory-Aland numbering) is a Greek uncial manuscript of the New Testament. Paleographically it has been assigned to the 9th century.

== Description ==
The codex contains a small part of the Gospel of Matthew 12:27-39, on one parchment leaf (33 cm by 26 cm). It is written in two columns per page, with 26 lines per column, in uncial letters. It is a palimpsest, the upper text contains a menaeon in Greek. It was formerly grouped with Uncial 0272 and Uncial 0273 as part of Uncial 0133.

Currently, it is dated by the INTF to the 9th century.

== Location ==
The codex is currently housed at the British Library (Add MS 31919, f. 22) in London.

== Text ==
The Greek text of this codex is a representative of the Alexandrian text-type. Aland placed it in Category II.

== See also ==
- List of New Testament uncials
- Textual criticism
