= Uncial 087 =

- New Testament manuscript
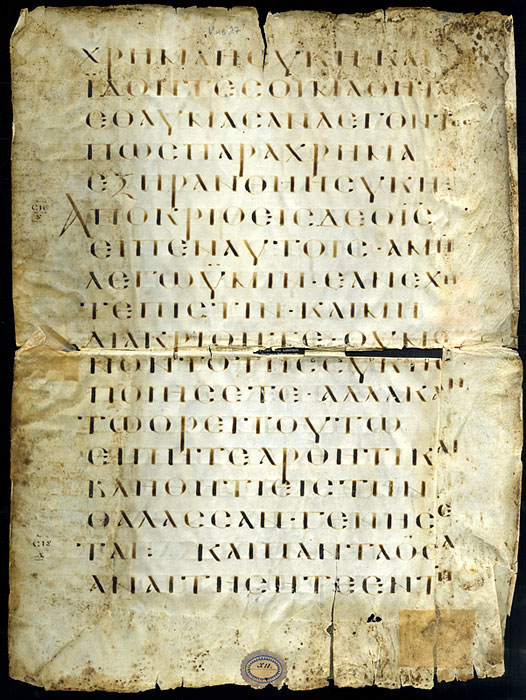
- Page with text of Matthew 21:19-24
- Text: Matt 1-2; 19; 21; John 18
- Date: 6th century
- Script: Greek
- Now at: Russian National Library, Saint Catherine's Monastery
- Size: 34 x 26 cm
- Type: Alexandrian text-type
- Category: II

Uncial 087 (in the Gregory-Aland numbering), ε 27 (Soden); is a Greek uncial manuscript of the New Testament, dated paleographically to the 6th century. Formerly it was labelled by Θ^{c}.

== Description ==
The codex contains a small parts of the Gospel of Matthew 1:23-2:2; 19:3-8; 21:19-24, and the Gospel of John 18:29-35 on 3 parchment leaves (34 by 26 cm). The text is written in one column per page, 18 lines per page, in very large uncial letters. The letters are similar to Codex Petropolitanus Purpureus.

It has initial letters, diaeresis, and punctuation. The words at the ends of lines are sometimes written in an abbreviated form.

The codex was brought by Porphyrius Uspensky from Sinai to Russia in 1858, and now is located at the Russian National Library (Gr. 12,278) in Saint Petersburg. Another part of the same codex is housed at the Saint Catherine's Monastery (Gr. 218) in Sinai. Tischendorf described fragment housed in Petersburg:

Etiam hoc fragmentum sexti saeculi videtur; litterarum forma inprimis simile est fragmentins illis tribus evangeliorum purpureis, Romae, Londini et Vindobonae servatis, quae anno 1846 in priore collectione Monumentorum Sacrorum publicavi. In apparatu critico editionis meae VII. siglo N notata sunt.

It was also examined by Eduard de Muralt, who gave two textual variants of the codex.

From the same manuscript came one parchment leaf, it was classified as Uncial 092b. It contains Mark 12:32-37. It has errors of itacism (e.g. εχεται for εχετε). It is still located in Saint Catherine's Monastery (Sinai Harris 11, 1 f.). It was discovered by J. Rendel Harris during his visit to Sinai in 1889, who published its text in 1890. Harris gave the following description of this fragment:

Two leaves of a sixth century MS. Of the Gospels, the first of the leaves having lost its upper half. The second leaf, having been folded in the middle when used to bind some other MS., has become illegible where it was folded. The hand is a large bold script, and the MS. From which the fragments came must have been a very fine one. The text is broken into short commata which are distinguished by a mart of punctuation: occasionally there are traces of the use of a colon as a mark of punctuation, and of as aspirate or perhaps a diacritic mark, (see the third line of Fol. 1, recto): we have printed this last as if it were an aspirate, but with some hesitation; it looks more like the pair of dots which denote initial iota connected by a scribe’s flourish. The second leaf shews the smooth breathing in its early square form: see line 15 of the recto of the leaf. The MS. shews the itacism of αι for ε as is common in early uncial texts (εχεται for εχετε).

The Greek text of this codex is a representative of the Alexandrian text-type with some alien readings. Aland placed it in Category II.

Currently it is dated by the INTF to the 6th century.

== See also ==
- List of New Testament uncials
- Uncial 089
- Related Bible parts: Matthew 1-2; 19; 21; John 18
