= Codex Claromontanus V =

Latin manuscript of the New Testament

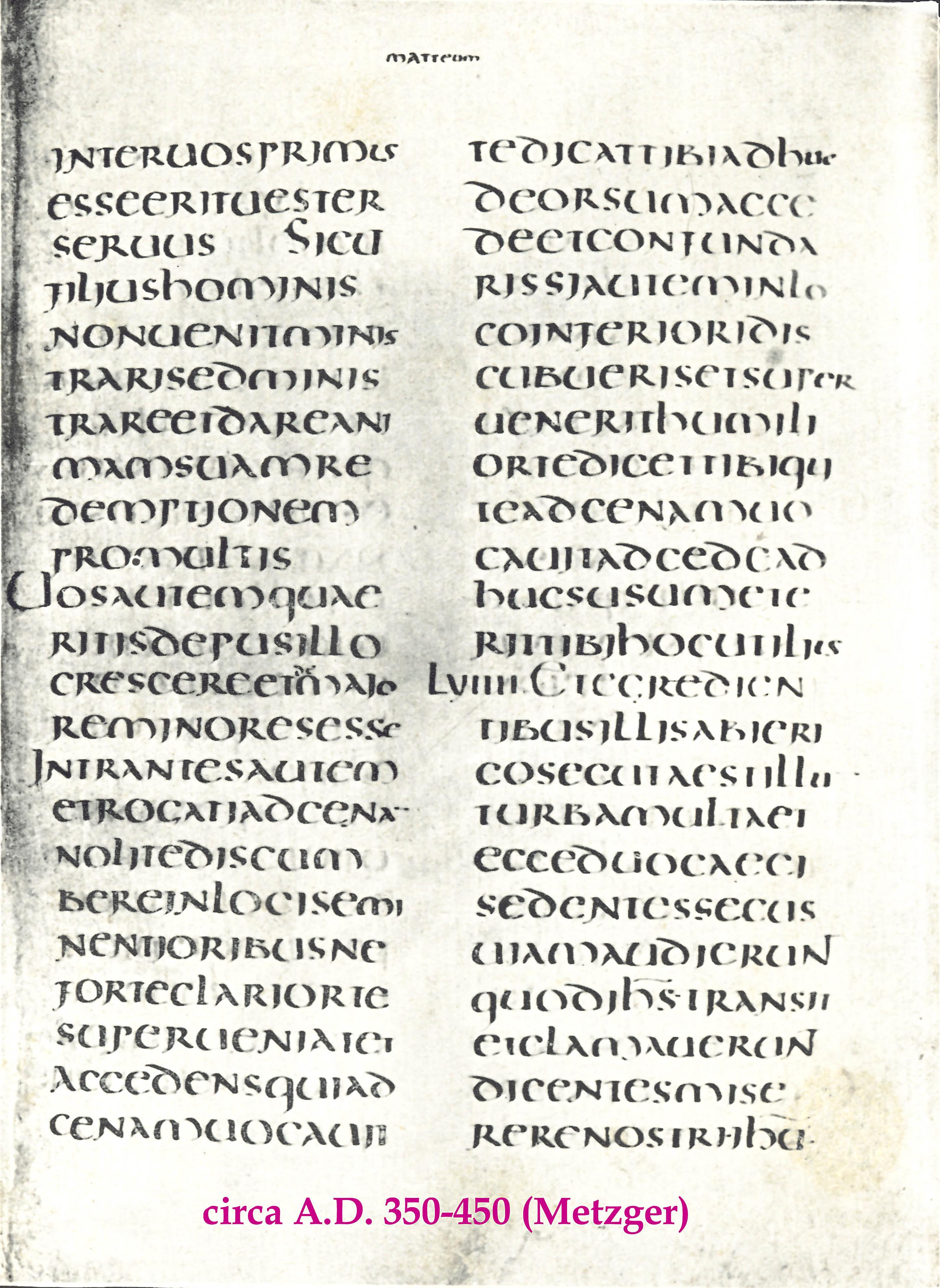
Folio 38 recto with text of Matthew 20:27-30

The Codex Claromontanus V, designated by h in traditional system or by 12 in the Beuron system, is a 4th- or 5th-century Latin manuscript of the New Testament. The text, written on vellum.

== Description ==
The manuscript contains the text of the four Gospels with lacunae in Matthew 1:1-3:15; 14:44-18:12 on 66 parchment leaves. It contains the Ammonian Sections and Eusebian Canons, it uses abbreviations.

== Text ==
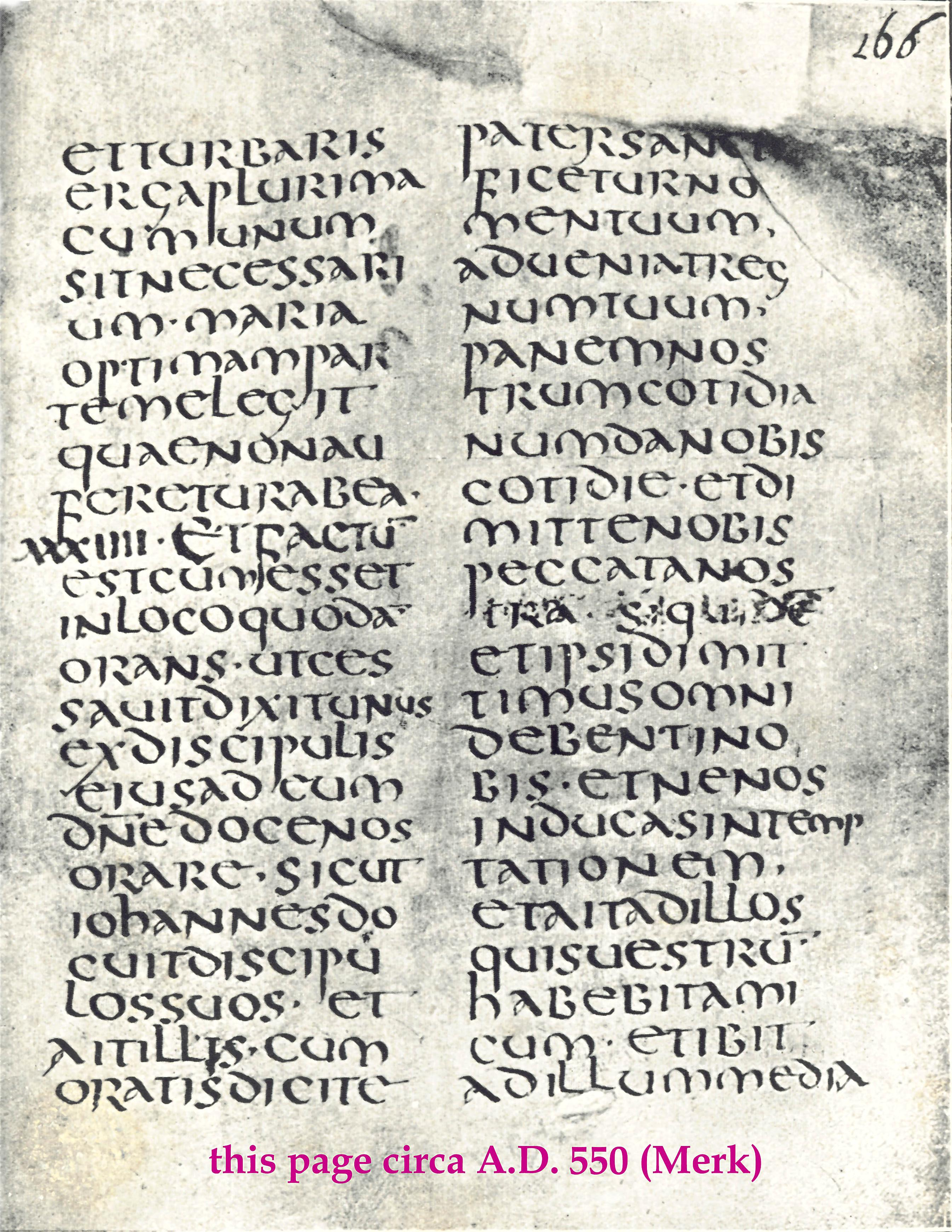
Folio 166 recto with text of Luke 10:41-11:5

The text of the codex represents Old Latin textual tradition in the Gospel of Matthew. In rest of Gospels it has text of Vulgate.

The nomina sacra are written in an abbreviated way.

== History ==
The manuscript was bought by Pius VI (1775-1798).

The text of the codex was edited by Paul Sabatier, Angelo Mai, Johannes Belsheim, and Jülicher.

== Location ==
The codex is located, in the Vatican Library (Lat. 7223) at Vatican.

== See also ==
- List of New Testament Latin manuscripts
