= Uncial 0273 =

- New Testament manuscript
- Text: John 2-3 †; 4; 5-6 †
- Date: 9th century
- Script: Greek
- Now at: British Library
- Size: 33 x 26 cm
- Type: Byzantine text-type (?)
- Category: V (?)

Uncial 0273 (in the Gregory-Aland numbering), is a Greek uncial manuscript of the New Testament. Paleographically it has been assigned to the 9th century.

== Description ==
The codex contains a small parts of the Gospel of John, on 3 parchment leaves (33 cm by 26 cm). It is written in two columns per page, 25 lines per page, in uncial letters. It is a palimpsest, the upper text contains menaeon in Greek. Formerly it was included together with Uncial 0271 and Uncial 0272 in Uncial 0133 (because of similarities).

Currently it is dated by the INTF to the 6th century.

== Contents ==
The codex contains: Gospel of John 2:7-3:5; 4:23-37; 5:35-6:2.

== Text ==
The Greek text of this codex probably is a representative of the Byzantine text-type. Aland placed it with hesitation in Category V.

== Location ==
The codex is housed at the British Library (Add MS 31919, ff. 29, 99, 101) in London.

== See also ==
- List of New Testament uncials
- Textual criticism
