= Biblioteca Queriniana, Brescia =

- Biblioteca Queriniana, Brescia
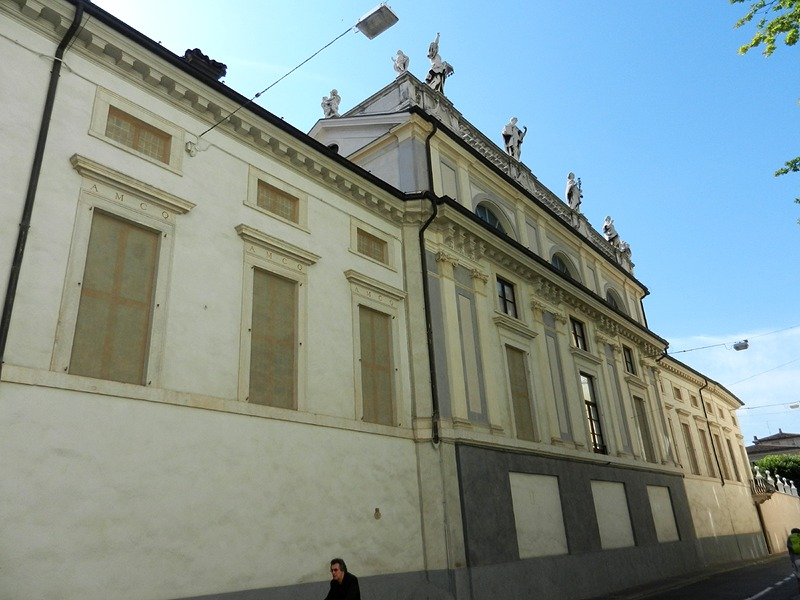
- Exterior of Library with decorated roofline
- 45°32′17″N 10°13′22″E
- Location: Brescia, Italy
- Type: Public library
- Established: 1747

Collection
- Size: 650,105 item (2019), 9,751 item (2019), 362,384 item (2020), 368,530 item (2021), 469,767 item (2022), 8,644 item (2022), 417,000 volume, 1,158 item

Other information
- Website: https://queriniana.comune.brescia.it/

The Biblioteca Queriniana is a public library with a rich collection of ancient manuscripts, located on Via Giuseppe Mazzini in Brescia, region of Lombardy, Italy. The library was founded in 1747 and owes the nucleus of its collection to Cardinal Angelo Maria Querini (1680–1755).

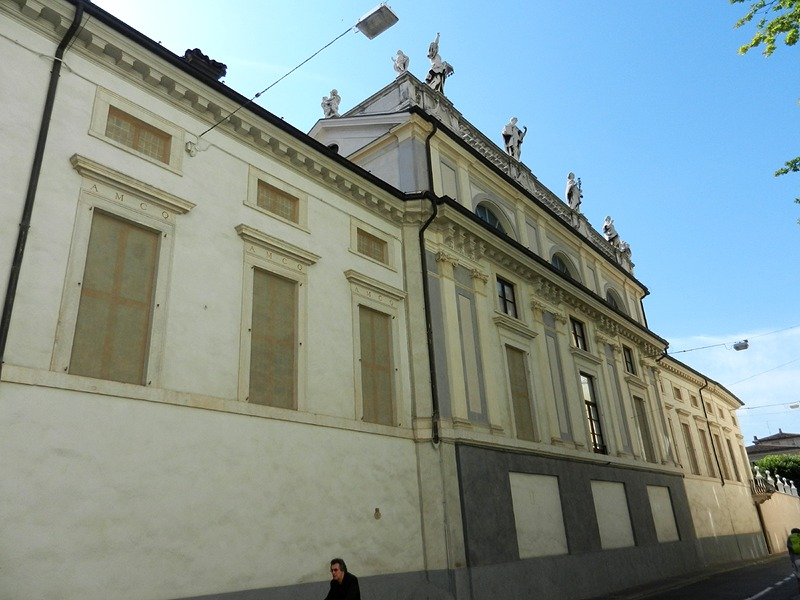
Exterior of Library with decorated roofline

== History ==
The library was founded by the cardinal, who commissioned architect Antonio Marchetti to design a building for the institution. It was located at the archbishop's palace. In 1797, the Napoleonic government nationalized the library, placing it under the ownership of the commune.

Over the centuries, the collection has grown through the addition of libraries from suppressed Catholic monasteries and churches, as well as donations from private individuals. Eighteenth-century Italy had a number of examples of public libraries endowed by Catholic church leaders, including the Biblioteca Forteguerriana and Fabroniana of Pistoia and the Biblioteca Marucelliana of Florence.

Among notable manuscripts in its collection are:

- Codex Brixianus (Evangelario purpureo) (6th century)
- Concordance of the Gospels by Eusebius (11th century)
- Fragments of a text by San Cipriano (5th century)
- English Psalter (14th century)
- Greek Gospel (10th century)
- Pages of the Koran (15th century)
- Divine Comedy, edition by Bonini with woodcuts
- Illuminated first edition of the Canzoniere of Petrarch

The library possesses over 526,000 volumes, of which 130,000 were published before 1830.

== Bibliography ==
- Ennio Sandal (1990). "Endowed Municipal Public Libraries". Libraries & Culture. 25 (3: Libraries and Librarianship in Italy). USA: 358–371. JSTOR 25542275.
