= Uncial 089 =

- New Testament manuscript
- Text: Matt 26
- Date: 6th century
- Script: Greek
- Now at: Russian National Library; Saint Catherine's Monastery
- Size: 36 x 24 cm
- Type: Alexandrian text-type
- Category: II

Uncial 089 in the Gregory-Aland numbering), ε 28 (Soden), is a Greek uncial manuscript of the New Testament, dated paleographically to the 6th century. The codex now is located at the Russian National Library (Gr. 280) in Saint Petersburg. It came to Russia from Sinai.

== Description ==
The codex contains a small parts of the Gospel of Matthew 26:2-4,7-9, on a fragment of one parchment leaf (36 cm by 28 cm). It is written in one column per page, 17 lines per page, in very large uncial letters. The letters are large, it has breathings.

From the same manuscript descendant one parchment leaf classified as Uncial 092a. It contains Gospel of Matthew 26:4-7,10-12. It is located at the Saint Catherine's Monastery (Sinai Harris 11, 1 f.) in Sinai. 089 and 092a are fragments of the same leaf.

Also Uncial 0293 (2 leaves) formerly belonged to the same manuscript. It was discovered in May 1975 during restoration work. It is still located in Saint Catherine's Monastery.

Currently it is dated by the INTF to the 6th century.

== Text ==
The Greek text of this codex is a representative of the Alexandrian text-type with some western readings. In close relation to Codex Sinaiticus, Vaticanus, Regius, and sometimes with Codex Bezae. Aland placed it in Category II.

In Matthew 26:7 – βαρυτιμου along with manuscripts: B, W, 0133, 0255, f^{1}, f^{13}, Byz; the other manuscripts read πολυτιμου (Sinaiticus, Alexandrinus, Bezae, Regius, Koridethi, 33, 565, 892, 1010 1424).

== See also ==
- List of New Testament uncials
- Uncial 087
- Textual criticism
