= Purple parchment =

Parchment dyed purple with gold or silver lettering

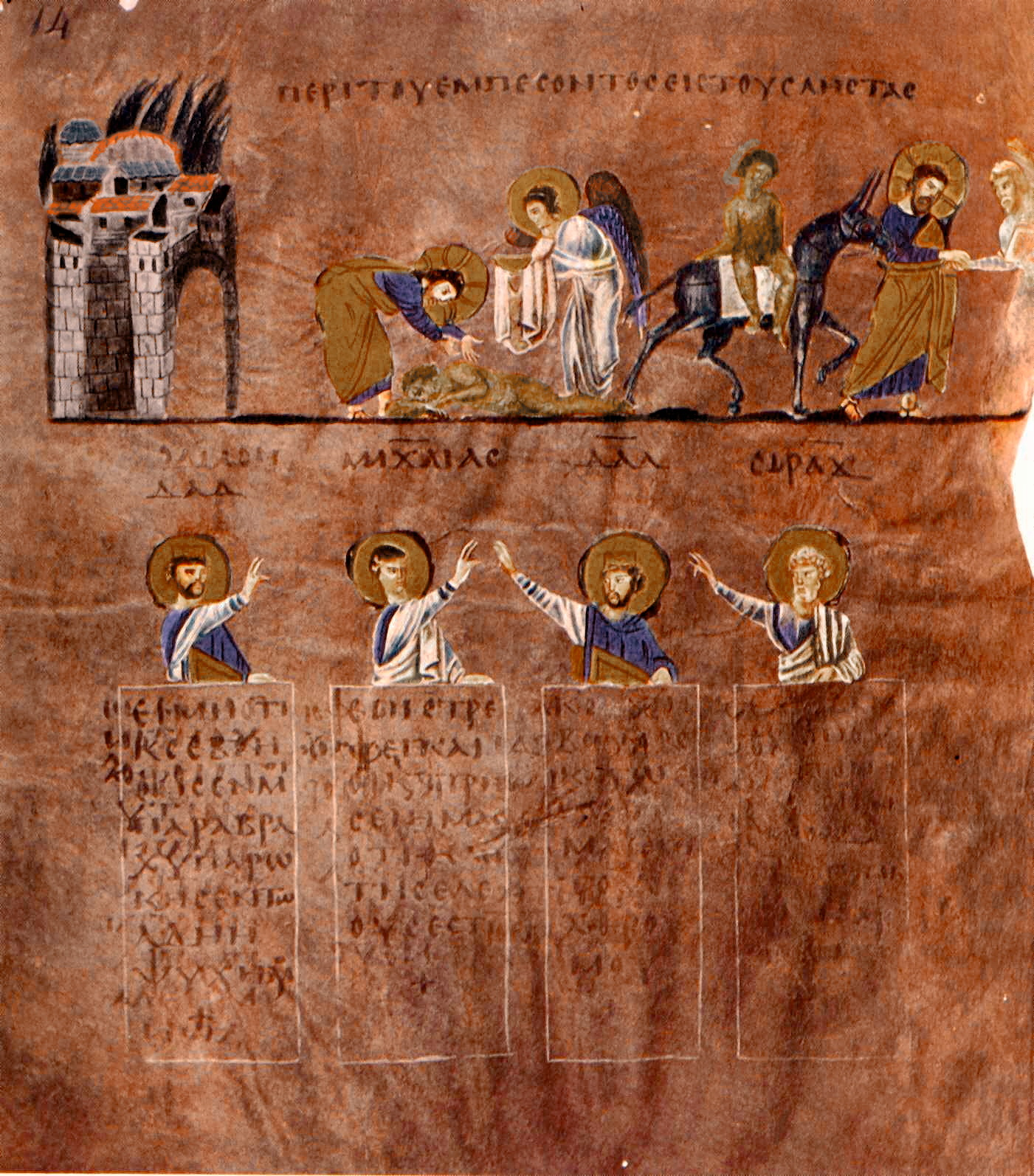
Page from the Rossano Gospels

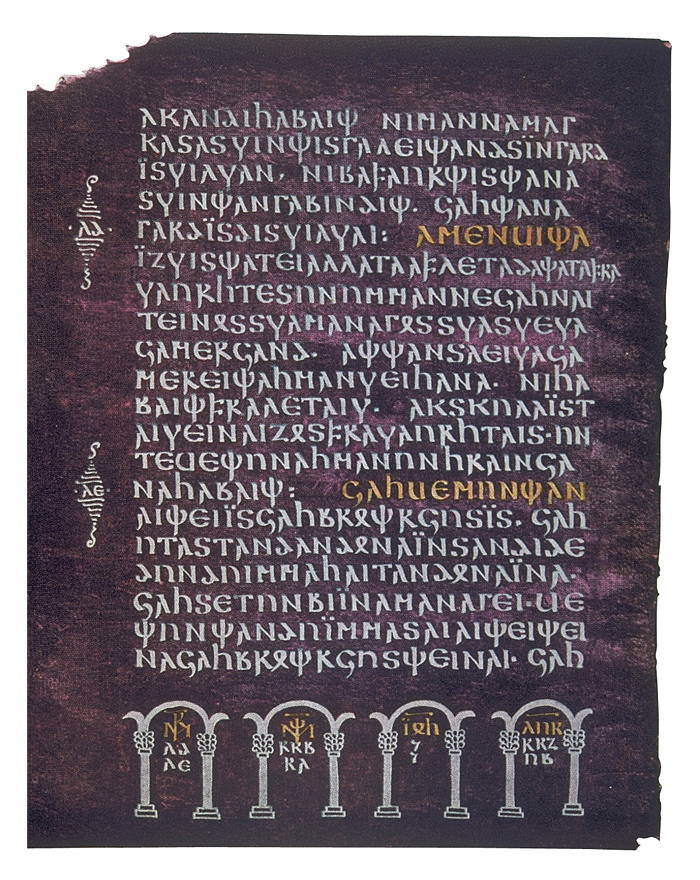
A page of the 6th-century Codex Argenteus, in silver and gold ink on purple

Purple parchment or purple vellum refers to parchment dyed purple; codex purpureus refers to manuscripts written entirely or mostly on such parchment. The lettering may be in gold or silver. Later the practice was revived for some especially grand illuminated manuscripts produced for the emperors in Carolingian art and Ottonian art, in Anglo-Saxon England and elsewhere. Some just use purple parchment for sections of the work; the 8th-century Anglo-Saxon Stockholm Codex Aureus alternates dyed and un-dyed pages.

It was at one point supposedly restricted for the use of Roman or Byzantine emperors, although in a letter of Saint Jerome of 384, he "writes scornfully of the wealthy Christian women whose books are written in gold on purple vellum, and clothed with gems".

== Examples ==
The Purple Uncials or the Purple Codices is a well-known group of these manuscripts, all 6th-century New Testament Greek manuscripts:

- Codex Purpureus Petropolitanus N (022)
- Sinope Gospels O (023) (illuminated)
- Rossano Gospels Σ (042) (illuminated)
- Codex Beratinus Φ (043) (illuminated)
- Uncial 080

Two other purple New Testament Greek manuscripts are minuscules:

- Minuscule 565 known as the Empress Theodora's Codex
- Minuscule 1143 known as Beratinus 2

There is a 9th-century lectionary:

- Codex Neapolitanus, former Codex Vindobonensis 2

Another five New Testament purple manuscripts are in Latin (with corresponding sigla a, b, e, f, i, j). Besides some scattered fragments, they are held mainly in: Brescia, Naples, Sarezzano, Trent and Vienna. Three of these use Vetus Latina texts:

- Codex Veronensis
- Codex Palatinus
- Codex Brixianus
- Codex Purpureus Sarzanensis
- Codex Vindobonensis Lat. 1235

There is also one Gothic purple codex – the Codex Argenteus (illuminated).

There is a purple manuscript of part of the Septuagint:

- Vienna Genesis (illuminated)

Other illuminated manuscripts include the Godescalc Evangelistary of 781–3, the Vienna Coronation Gospels (early 9th century) and a few pages of the 9th-century La Cava Bible from the Kingdom of Asturias. Anglo-Saxon examples include a lost 7th-century Gospels commissioned by Saint Wilfrid.

== Source of the dye ==
Both the mucus of snail Hexaplex trunculus and the crushed archil lichen Roccella tinctoria were the source for dyed parchments in ancient times. Tyrian purple is made from Mediterranean predatory snails, including the banded dye-murex. Orchil is the dye from lichens. Either dye can successfully be used for parchment.

== See also ==
- Codex Turicensis
- Biblical manuscript
- Godescalc Evangelistary
- Black books of hours
