= Johannes Belsheim =

Norwegian priest, translator, and biographer (1829–1909)

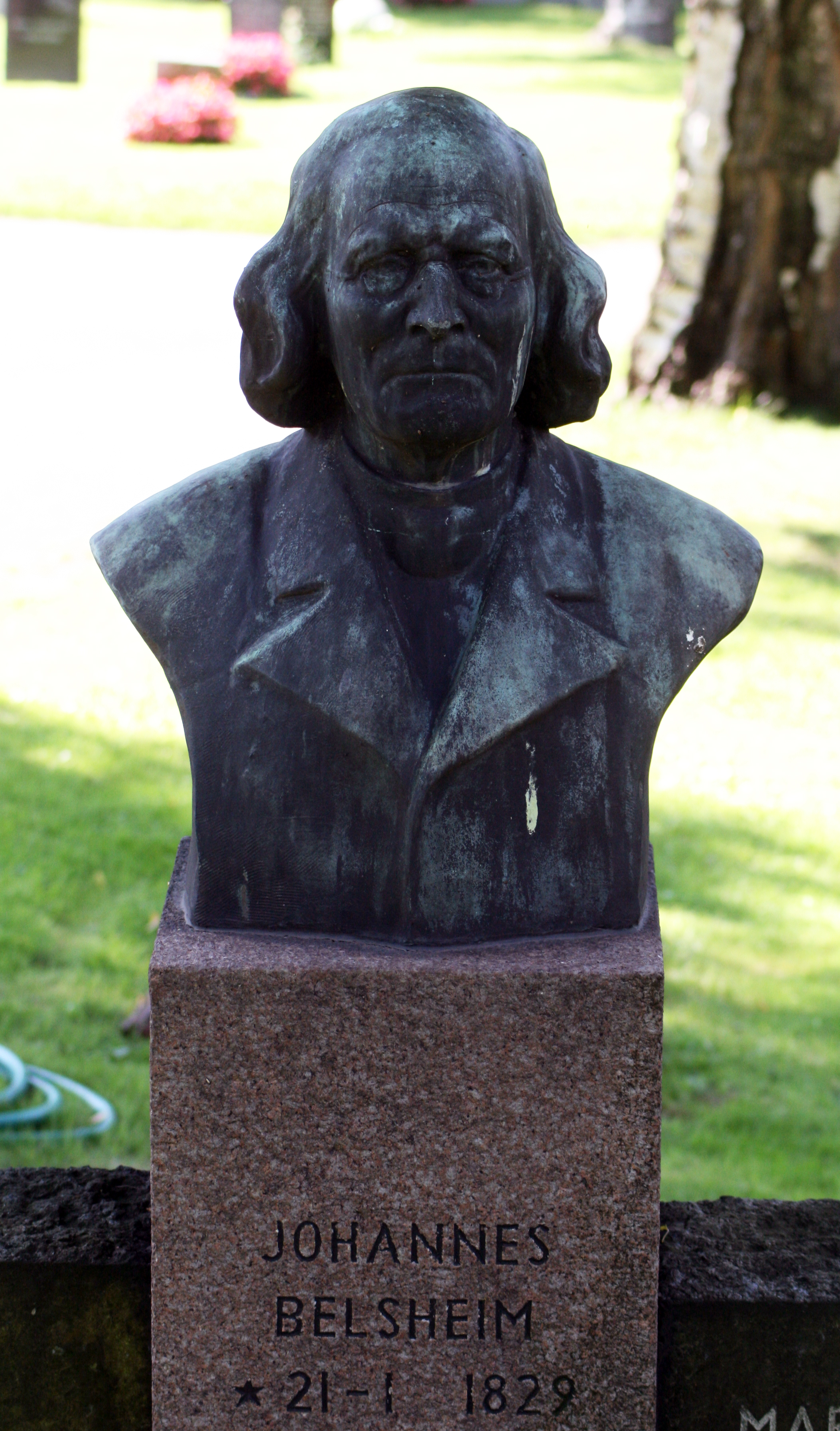
Johannes Belsheim monument at Vår Frelsers gravlund in Oslo

Johannes Engebretsen Belsheim (21 January 1829 – 15 July 1909) was a Norwegian teacher, priest, translator and biographer.

Johannes Belsheim was born in the village of Thorpegardane at Vang Municipality in Oppland county. He attended Asker Seminary in Akershus county. Belsheim took matriculation in 1858. He attended Heltberg's school which prepared students for admission exams at the university and in 1861 he took his Degree in Theology. He was a teacher in Grue Municipality in Solør from 1856 and at the town of Porsgrunn in Telemark during 1862. He served as rector of the teacher's college in Vefsn Municipality (Vefsn lærerskole) in Nordland county during 1863. He was assigned as vicar in Sør-Varanger Municipality in 1864 and at Bjelland Municipality in Vest-Agder county from 1870 to 1875.

As a writer, his topics covered several themes. He is principally associated with his studies of Biblical manuscripts, including the Codex Aureus, Codex Gigas, Codex Corbeiensis I, Codex Palatinus, Codex Veronensis, and Codex Claromontanus V. He also wrote a biography of Ivar Aasen.

== Works ==
- Codex aureus, sive quattuor evangelia ante Hieronymum Latine translata (1878)
- Palimpsestus vindobonensis antiqvissimae veteris testamenti: translationis Latinae fragmenta (1885)
- Das Evangelium des Markus, Christiana Videnskabs-Selskabs Forhandlinger 9 (Christiana, 1885).
- Evangelium secundum Matthaeum, Christiania 1892
- Codex Vercellensis; quatuor evangelia ante hieronymum latine translata ex reliquiis codicis vercellensis, saeculo ut videtur quatro scripti et ex editione iriciana principe, Christiania 1894
- Evangelium palatinum: reliqvias IV Evangeliorum ante Hieronymum latine (1896)
- Ivar Aasen. En Levnetsskildring (1901)
- Codex veronensis; quattuor Euangelia ante Hieronymum latine translata eruta & codice scripto ut videtur saeculo quarto vel quinto in Bibliotheca episcopali veronensi asservato et ex Josephi Blanchini editione principe (Pragae 1904)
