= Codex Petropolitanus Purpureus =

Uncial 022
- New Testament manuscript
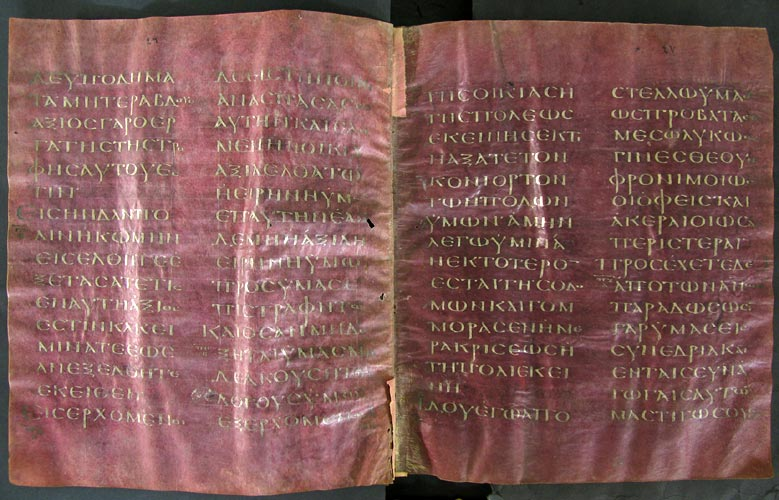
- Matthew 10:10-17
- Name: Petropolitanus Purpureus
- Sign: N
- Text: Gospels
- Date: 6th century
- Script: Greek
- Found: Sarmisahly (or Sarumsahly)
- Now at: National Library of Russia
- Size: 32 cm x 27 cm
- Type: Byzantine
- Category: V
- Note: purple codex

The Codex Petropolitanus Purpureus ("Purple Codex of Saint Petersburg"), designated by N or 022 (in the Gregory-Aland numbering of New Testament manuscripts), ε19 (in the von Soden numbering of New Testament manuscripts), is a Greek New Testament codex containing the four Gospels written on parchment. Using the study of comparative writing styles (palaeography), it has been assigned to the 6th century CE.

Codex Petropolitanus Purpureus, along with the manuscripts Codex Beratinus (Φ), Sinope Gospels (O), and Rossano Gospels (Σ), belongs to the group of the Purple Uncials. The manuscript has many gaps.

== Description ==
The manuscript is a codex (precursor to the modern book), containing the text of the four Gospels on 231 parchment leaves (32 x 27 cm), with the text written in two columns, 16 lines per page, 12 letters in line, in large uncial letters. The lettering is in silver ink on vellum that has been dyed purple, with gold ink used for the nomina sacra (these being words and names considered sacred in Christian writings: Ι̅Σ̅ for Jesus, Θ̅Σ̅ for God, Κ̅Σ̅ for Lord or Master, Υ̅Σ̅ for Son, and Σ̅Ω̅Τ̅Η̅Ρ̅ for saviour). It has errors of iotacisms (misspelling of similar sounding letters and combinations of letters), such as the change of ι with ει, and αι with ε (and vice-versa). It has been calculated the original codex contained 462 leaves.

The tables of contents (known as κεφάλαια / kephalaia) are placed before each Gospel. The text is divided according to the chapters (also known as κεφάλαια), whose numbers are given at the margin, with the titles of the chapters (known as τίτλοι / titloi) written at the top of the pages. The Ammonian sections and the Eusebian Canons are presented in the margin.

== Missing portions ==
Gospel of Matthew 1:1-24, 2:7-20, 3:4-6:24, 7:15-8:1, 8:24-31, 10:28-11:3, 12:40-13:4, 13:33-41, 14:6-22, 15:14-31, 16:7-18:5, 18:26-19:6, 19:13-20:6, 21:19-26:57, 26:65-27:26, 27:34-end;

Gospel of Mark 1:1-5:20. 7:4-20, 8:32-9:1, 10:43-11:7, 12:19-14:25, 15:23-33, 15:42-16:20;

Gospel of Luke 1:1-2:23, 4:3-19, 4:26-35, 4:42-5:12, 5:33-9:7, 9:21-28, 9:36-58, 10:4-12, 10:35-11:14, 11:23-12:12, 12:21-29, 18:32-19:17, 20:30-21:22, 22:49-57, 23:41-24:13, 24:21-39, 24:49-end;

Gospel of John 1:1-21, 1:39-2:6, 3:30-4:5, 5:3-10, 5:19-26, 6:49-57, 9:33-14:2, 14:11-15:14, 15:22-16:15, 20:23-25, 20:28-30, 21:20-end.

== Text ==
The text of the codex is considered to be a representative of the Byzantine text-type, with numerous pre-Byzantine readings. According to 19th century biblical scholar Frederick H. A. Scrivener, "it exhibits strong Alexandrian forms." According to biblical scholar Burnett Hillman Streeter, in parts it has some Caesarean readings. Biblical scholar Kurt Aland placed it in Category V of his New Testament manuscripts classification system, and it is certain that it is more Byzantine than anything else.

The texts of Luke 22:43-44, and John 7:53–8:11 are omitted.

In John 1:27 it has the addition εκεινος υμας Βαπτιζει εν πνευματι αγιω και πυρι (He shall baptise you with the Holy Spirit and fire).

== History ==
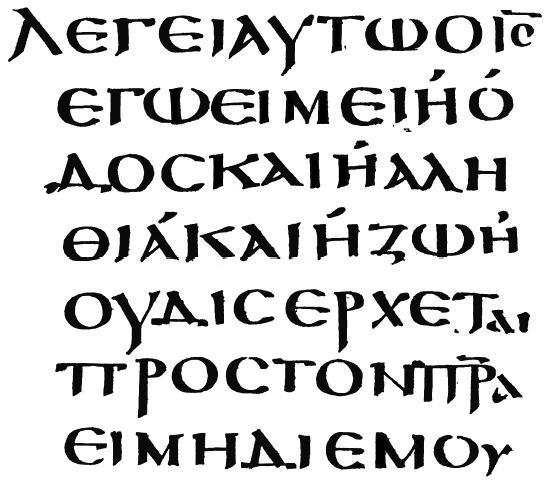
Text of John 14:6 in facsimile edition

It is understood that the manuscript originated in the imperial scriptorium of Constantinople and was dismembered by crusaders in the 12th century. In 1896 Nicholas II of Russia commissioned Fyodor Uspensky's Russian Archaeological Institute of Constantinople to buy the greater part of it for the Imperial Public Library in St. Petersburg.

The codex was examined by scholar Peter Lambeck, Bernard de Montfaucon, Hermann Treschow, Francis Alter, Hartel, Wickholf, Giuseppe Bianchini, Harry S. Cronin, and Louis Duchesne.

Textual critic Johann Jakob Wettstein examined 4 leaves housed at London (Cotton Titus C. XV) in 1715, and marked them by I. Wettstein cited only 5 of its readings. According to Scrivener it has 57 variant readings. Bianchini described portions housed at the Vatican Library. The same portions were examined and collated for textual critic Johann M. Augustin Scholz by Gaetano Luigi Marini.

The Vienna fragments of Codex Vindobonensis were examined by Wettstein, who marked them by the siglum N. Treschow in 1773 and Alter in 1787 had given imperfect collations of the Vienna fragments. Lambeck gave the wrong suggestion that the Vienna fragments and the Vienna Genesis manuscript originally belonged to the same codex.

Textual critic Constantin von Tischendorf published fragments of this manuscript in 1846 in his Monumenta sacra et profana. Tischendorf considered it as a fragment of the same codex as 6 leaves from the Vatican, and 2 leaves from Vienna.

Louis Duchesne described the Patmos portions (1876). The Athens and New York portions were edited by Stanley Rypins in 1956.

A facsimile of all the manuscript's fragments was published in 2002 in Athens.

Biblical scholar Elijah Hixson published a monograph in 2019 entitled, Scribal Habits in Sixth-Century Greek Purple Codices. In it, Hixson has a transcription for all of the extant portions of Matthew. The monograph was highly praised by Thomas Kraus, Hixson's own summary of his dissertation (which was the basis for the monograph), and his interview with James Snapp on the purple codices.

== Present location ==
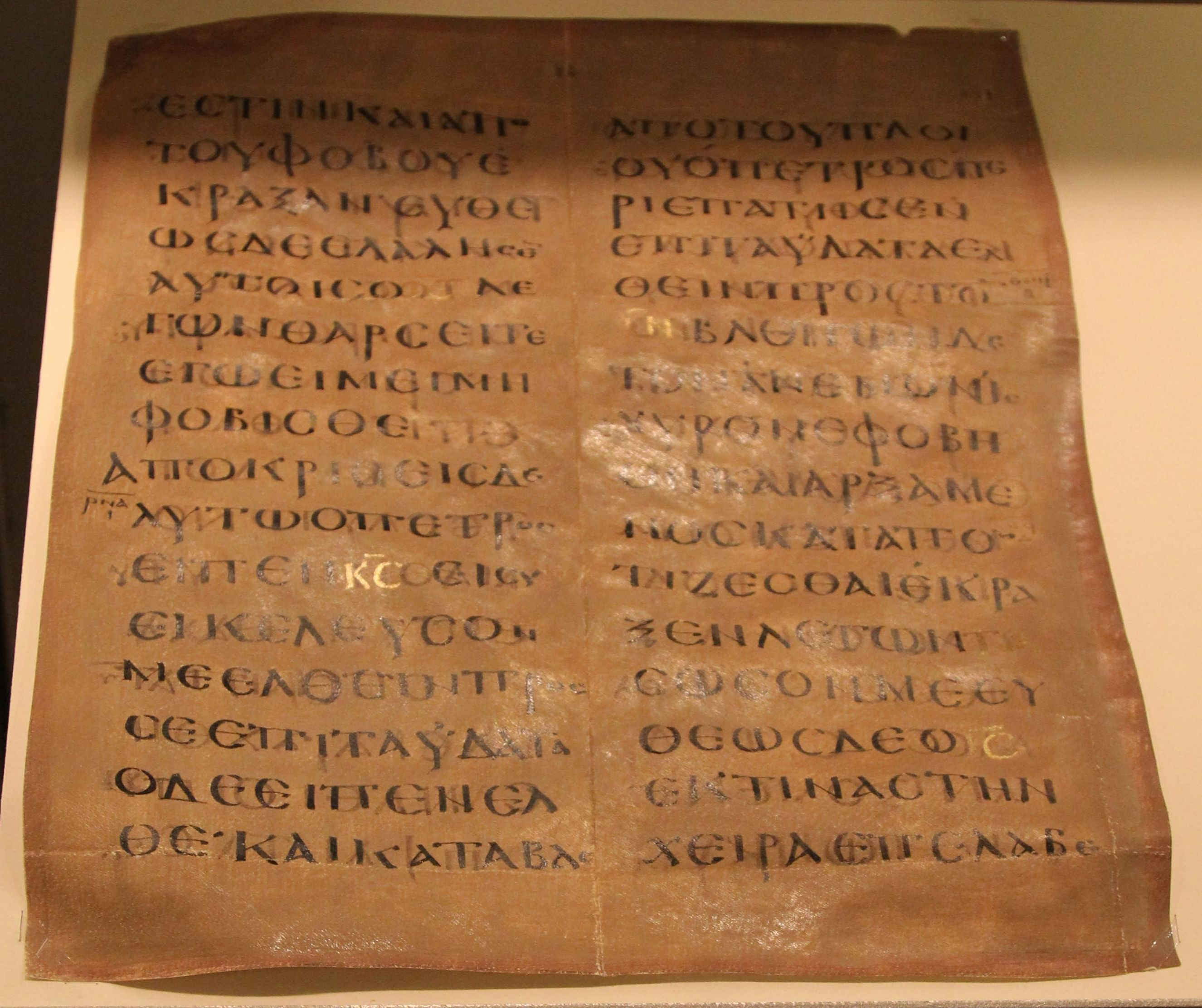
The page in the Byzantine Museum in Athens

The 231 extant leaves (known as folios) of the manuscript are kept in different libraries:

- 182 leaves are in the National Library of Russia in Saint Petersburg,
- 33 leaves are in the Library of the Monastery of Saint John the Theologian on the Island of Patmos, Greece, Mark 6:53-7:4; 7:20-8:32; 9:1-10:43; 11:7-12:19; 14:25-15:23;
- 6 leaves are in the Vatican Library in Vatican, Matthew 19:6-13; 20:6-22; 20:29-21:19
- 4 leaves are in London, British Library, Cotton Titus C. XV; Matthew 26:57-65; 27:26-34; John 14:2-10; 15:15-22; they were named the Codex Cottonianus;
- 2 leaves are in the National Library of Austria in Vienna,
- 1 leaf is in the Morgan Library in New York,
- 1 leaf is in the Byzantine Museum in Athens,
- 1 leaf is in the Museum of Byzantine Culture in Thessaloniki
- 1 leaf is in the private collection of Marquis А. Spinola in Lerma (1), Italy.

== See also ==
- List of New Testament uncials
- Textual criticism
- Purple parchment
- Uncial 087
