= Codex Brixianus =

6th-century Latin Gospel Book

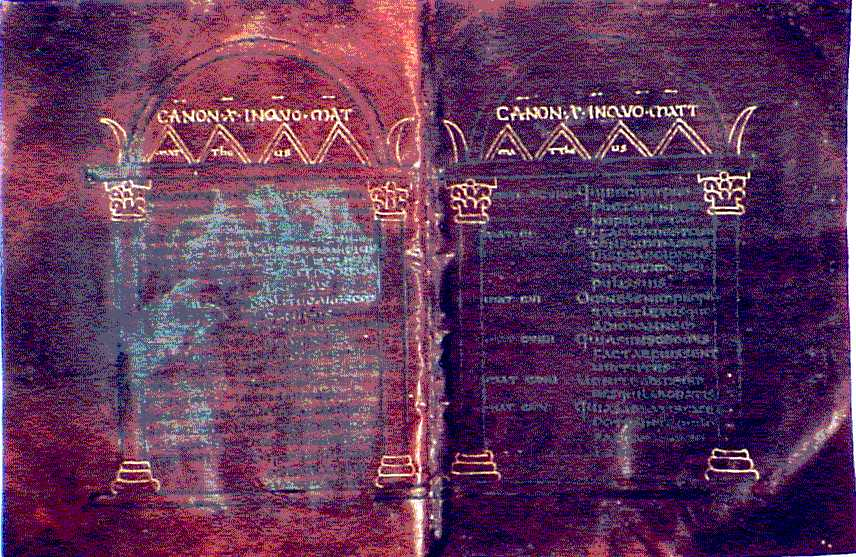
Canon tables from the Codex Brixianus

The Codex Brixianus is Latin Gospel Book. It is designated by the siglum f or VL10 in the Beuron numbering of Vetus Latina manuscripts. The codex was probably produced in Ravenna, Italy. Using the study of comparative writing styles (palaeography), it has been assigned to the 6th century. It is currently housed at the Queriniana Public Library (Biblioteca Civica Queriniana) in Brescia, Italy.

== Description ==
The manuscript is a codex (precursor to the modern book format) containing the text of the four Gospels written on 419 parchment folios. The Gospels are in the "Western" order of Matthew, John, Luke, Mark. It was named Brixianus after Brescia, where it is housed. The text is written in silver and gold ink on vellum which has been dyed purple. The text is written in single columns, 20 lines per page, with Eusebian section numbers (an early division of the Gospels into referenceable sections) written in the left margin.

It is a version of the Latin Vulgate translation of the Gospels with many old Latin readings, which seem to be connected with the Gothic translation of Ulfilas. At the base of each page is an artistic colonnade, very similar to that found in Codex Argenteus. Furthermore, the Latin text shows readings which seem to be influenced by the Gothic Bible translation.

There is a preface before the Gospels which discusses the difficulties of translation, with a specific comparison between Greek, Latin, and Gothic. In this preface there appears to be a criticism of Jerome and his translation of the Gospels.

== Text ==
It has some gaps (Matthew 8:16–26; Mark 12:5–13:32; 14:53–62; 14:70–16:20). In Luke 7:31, it contains the phrase "tunc ergo iesus dixit" (Then therefore Jesus said).

In John 11:41, alone of all the Old Latin Gospels, it had in the original hand the truncated reading "ubi fuerat" (where He was), a translation of the Greek ου ην, a reading found in the manuscripts Codex Alexandrinus (A), Codex Cyprius (K), Codex Guelferbytanus A (P), Uncial 0211, 0250, Family ƒ^{1}, minuscule 22, 579, and some others. This matches the Gothic reading "þarei was."

== History ==
The earliest history of the manuscript is unknown. It was copied somewhere in North Italy, with most scholars pointing to Ravenna as the most likely location. It is currently housed in the Queriniana Public Library (shelf number Evangelario purpureo) in Brescia.

== See also ==
- Purple parchment
- List of New Testament Latin manuscripts
