= Sinope Gospels =

Uncial 023
- New Testament manuscript
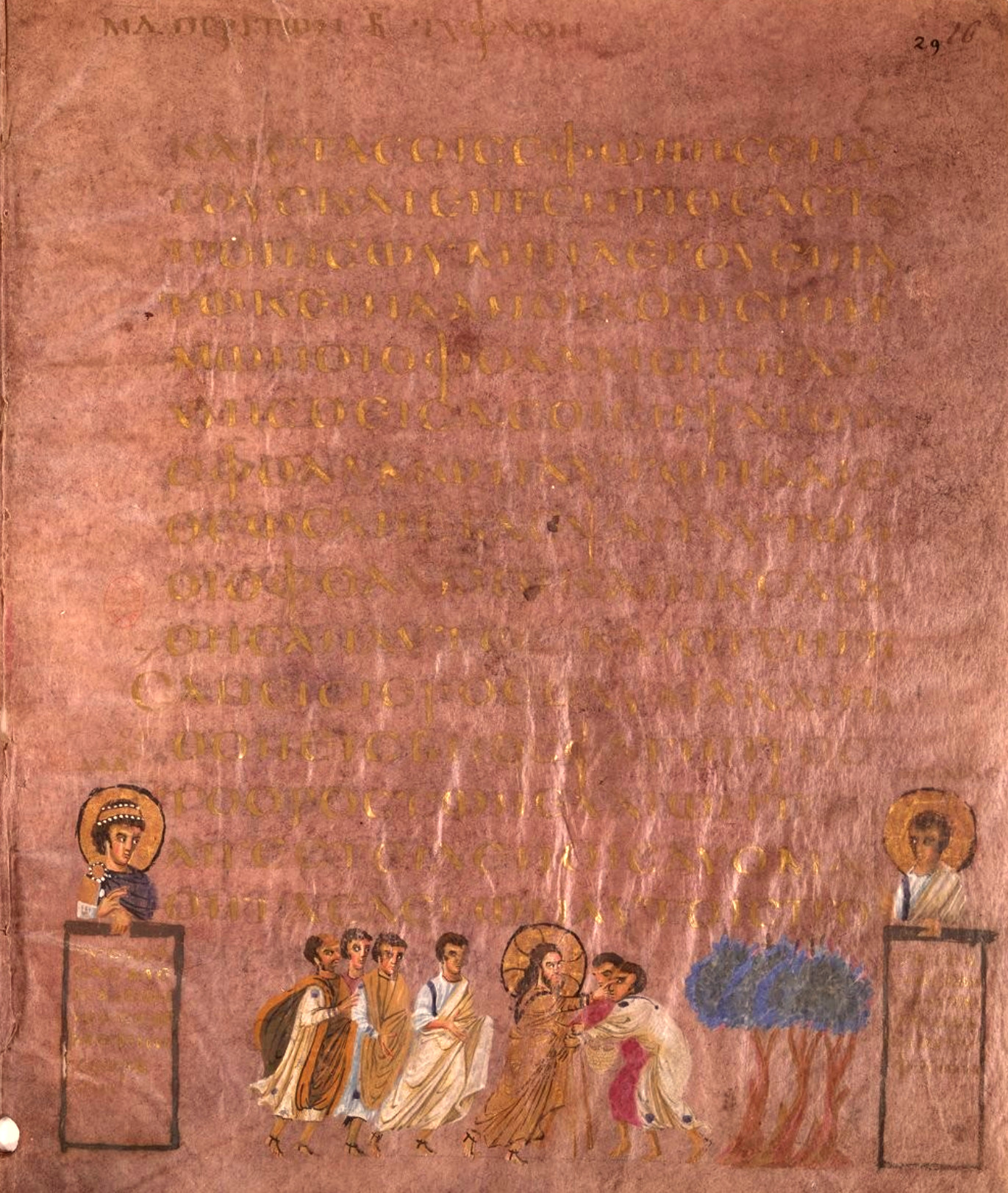
- A page from the Sinope Gospels. The miniature at the bottom shows Christ healing the blind
- Name: Sinope Gospels
- Sign: O
- Text: Gospel of Matthew
- Date: 6th-century
- Script: Greek
- Found: Sinope 1899
- Now at: Bibliothèque nationale de France
- Size: 30 x 25 cm
- Type: Byzantine
- Category: V

The Sinope Gospels, designated by O or 023 (in the Gregory-Aland numbering), ε 21 (Soden), also known as the Codex Sinopensis, is a fragment of a 6th-century illuminated Greek Gospel Book. Along with the Rossano Gospels, the Sinope Gospels has been dated, on the basis of the style of the miniatures, to the mid 6th-century. The Rossano Gospels, however, are considered to be earlier. Like Rossanensis and the Vienna Genesis, the Sinope Gospels are written on purple dyed vellum.

== Description ==
There are only 44 extant folios in the Sinope Gospels. These folios carry unframed miniatures at the bottom of the page which are similar in style to the miniatures in the Rossano Gospels. The folios measure approximately 30 cm by 25 cm. It is written in one column per page, 15 lines per column, in silver writing and gold. It is written in very large uncial letters. The manuscript is very lacunose.

Contents
Matthew 7:7-22; 11:5-12; 13:7-47; 13:54-14:4.13-20; 15:11-16:18; 17:2-24; 18:4-30; 19:3-10.17-25; 20:9-21:5; 21:12-22:7.15-24; 22:32-23:35; 24:3-12.

It contains five illuminated miniatures:

- the festival of Herod and death of John the Baptist (folio 10 verso)
- five thousand fed (folio 11 recto)
- four thousand fed (folio 15 recto)
- the healing of a blind man from Jericho (folio 29 recto)
- the cursing of the fig tree (folio 30 verso).

== History ==
It was written in the 6th-century. The style of illustrations suggests Syria or Palestine (even Mesopotamia) as the place of its origin. The codex was purchased in 1899 at Sinope (hence its name), by a French officer from an old Greek woman. Its text was published by Henri Omont in 1901. At least one authority has suggested this manuscript has an association with a church at Çiftlik, which was under archeological excavation in 1998.

According to B. H. Streeter it is a tertiary witness of the Caesarean text-type. This opinion was supported by Bruce Metzger. Aland placed it in Category V, which means the Byzantine text-type.

43 leaves (all but one) of the codex now are located at the Bibliothèque Nationale of the Manuscrits occidentaux (Supplement Grec. 1286) at Paris.

== See also ==
The manuscript is one of the most precious purple codices that survive from the Late Antique period. It has been subjected to a non-invasive diagnostic campaign to evaluate the quality of the colourants used in its decoration, to understand how the parchment was coloured. Analyses highlighted the presence of Ultramarine Blue, which, besides the use of pure gold for the ink and paint, certifies the high value of the manuscript. In addition, this must be seen as one of the earliest examples of its use in paintings. The purple colour of the parchment was identified as Orchil, a dye extracted from lichens, similar to the results of analytical investigations carried out on other purple codices, and not the expected Tyrian purple dye.

Sinope

- List of New Testament uncials

== Gallery ==
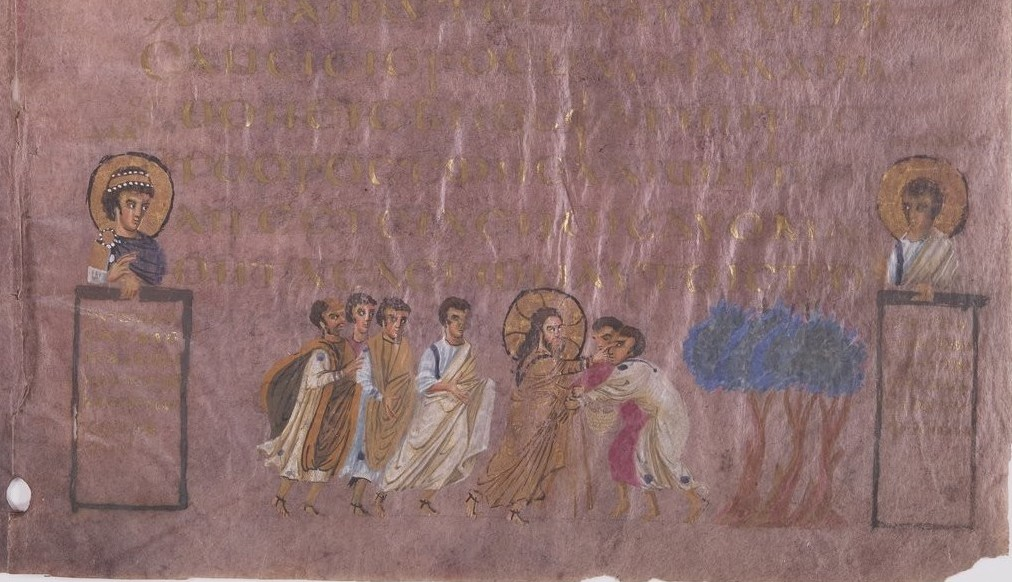
Scene of the healing of the two blind men, flanked by David and Isaiah, f. 29r

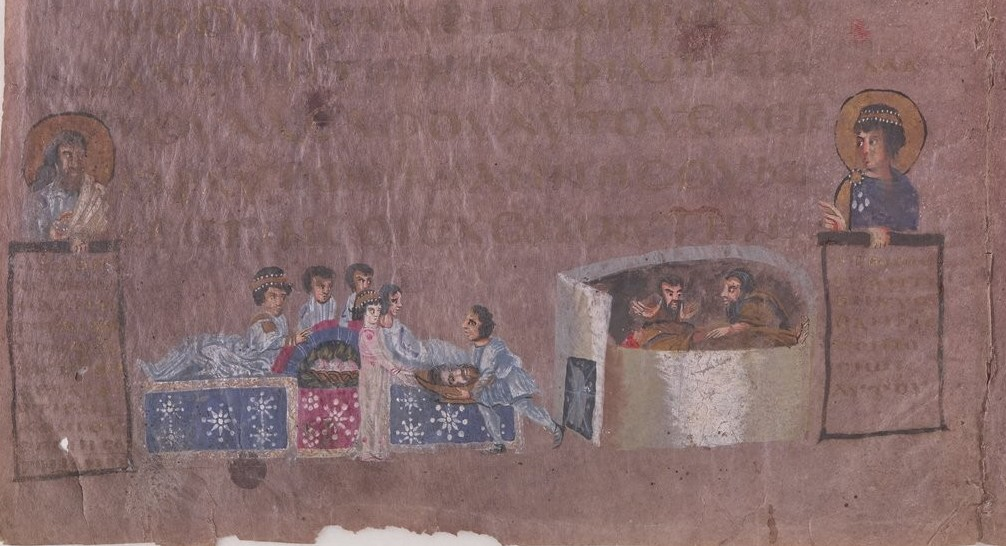
Salome with the Head of the Baptist, f. 10 v

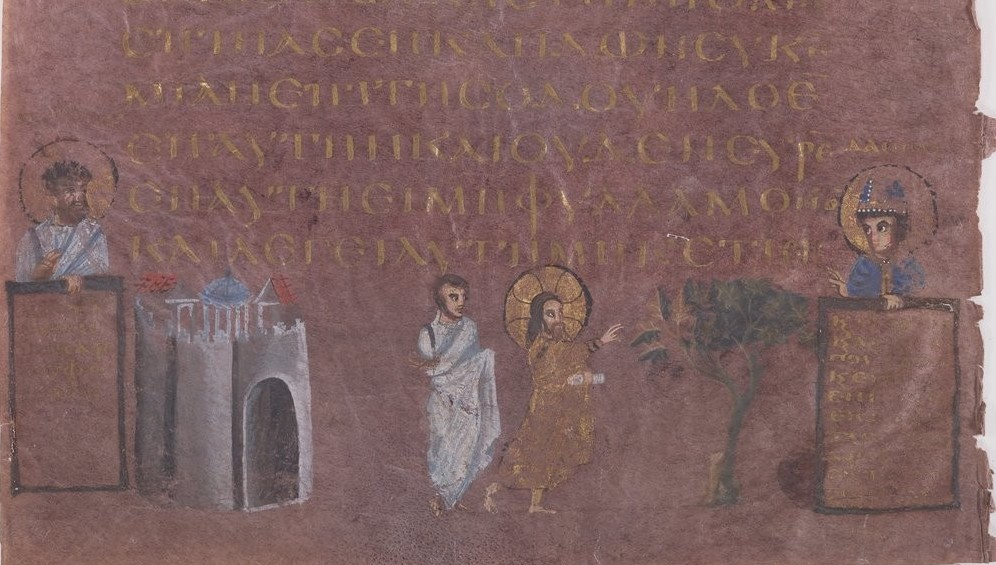
Parable of the Barren Fig Tree, Surrounded by David and Habakkuk, f. 30v
