= Codex Sinaiticus =

4th-century handwritten Bible copy in Greek

Uncial 01
- New Testament manuscript
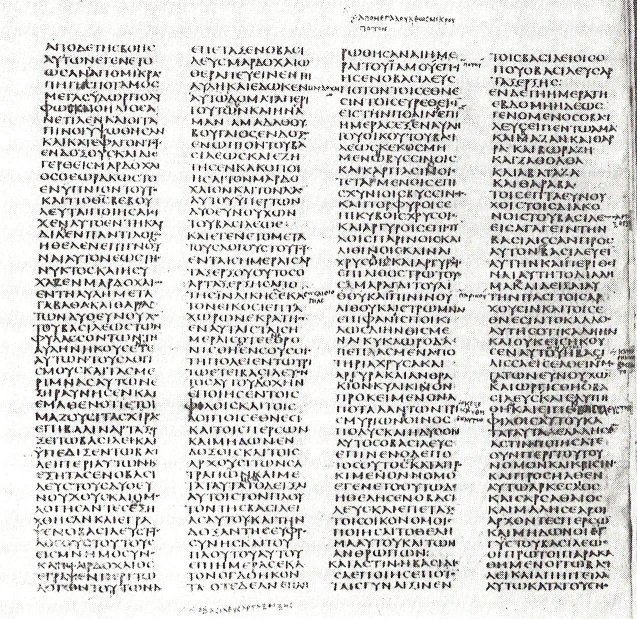
- Book of Esther
- Name: Sinaiticus
- Sign: $\aleph$
- Text: Greek Old Testament and Greek New Testament
- Date: c. 325-360
- Script: Greek
- Found: Sinai, 1844
- Now at: British Library, Leipzig University Library, Saint Catherine's Monastery, Russian National Library
- Cite: Lake, K. (1911). Codex Sinaiticus Petropolitanus, Oxford.
- Size: 38.1 × 34.5 cm (15.0 × 13.6 in)
- Type: Alexandrian text-type
- Category: I
- Note: very close to 𝔓^{66}

The Codex Sinaiticus (/sɪˈnaɪtɪkəs/; Shelfmark: London, British Library, Add MS 43725), also called the Sinai Bible, is a fourth-century Christian manuscript of a Greek Bible, containing the majority of the Greek Old Testament, including the deuterocanonical books, and the Greek New Testament, with both the Epistle of Barnabas and the Shepherd of Hermas included. It is designated by the siglum א or 01 in the Gregory-Aland numbering of New Testament manuscripts, and δ 2 in the von Soden numbering of New Testament manuscripts. It is written in uncial letters on parchment. It is one of the four great uncial codices (these being manuscripts which originally contained the whole of both the Old and New Testaments). Along with Codex Alexandrinus and Codex Vaticanus, it is one of the earliest and most complete manuscripts of the Bible, and contains the oldest complete copy of the New Testament. It is a historical treasure, and using the study of comparative writing styles (palaeography), it has been dated to the mid-fourth century.

Biblical scholarship considers Codex Sinaiticus to be one of the most important Greek texts of the New Testament, along with Codex Vaticanus. Until German Biblical scholar (and manuscript hunter) Constantin von Tischendorf's discovery of Codex Sinaiticus in 1844, the Greek text of Codex Vaticanus was unrivalled. Since its discovery, study of Codex Sinaiticus has proven to be useful to scholars for critical studies of the biblical text.

Codex Sinaiticus came to the attention of scholars in the 19th century at Saint Catherine's Monastery in the Sinai Peninsula, with further material discovered in the 20th and 21st centuries. Although parts of the codex are scattered across four libraries around the world, most of the manuscript is held today in the British Library in London, where it is on public display.

== Description ==
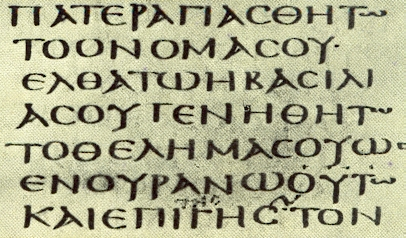
Luke 11:2 in Codex Sinaiticus

The manuscript is a codex (the forerunner to the modern book) made from vellum parchment, originally in double sheets, which may have measured about 40 by 70 cm. The whole codex consists of quires of eight leaves (with a few exceptions), a format which came to be popular throughout the Middle Ages (this being eight parchment pages laid on top of each other, and folded in half to make a full block (also known as a folio); several of these were then stitched together to create a book). The folios were made primarily from calf skins, secondarily from sheep skins. Tischendorf thought the parchment had been made from antelope skins, but modern microscopic examination has shown otherwise. Most of the quires (or signatures) contain four sheets, save two containing five. It is estimated that the hides of about 360 animals were employed for making the folios of this codex. Each line of the text has some twelve to fourteen Greek uncial letters, arranged in four columns, 48 lines per column, with carefully chosen line breaks and slightly ragged right edges. When opened, the eight columns thus presented to the reader have much the same appearance as the succession of columns in a papyrus roll. The poetical books of the Old Testament are written stichometrically (writing each new poetic phrase on a new line), in only two columns per page. The codex has almost 4,000,000 uncial letters. (Note: It was estimated by Tischendorf and used by Scrivener in his Introduction to the Sinaitic Codex (1867) as an argument against authorship of Simonides (Christianity, p. 1889.)) Each rectangular page has the proportions 1.1 to 1, while the block of text has the reciprocal proportions, 0.91 (the same proportions, rotated 90°). If the gutters between the columns were removed, the text block would mirror the page's proportions. Typographer Robert Bringhurst referred to the codex as a "subtle piece of craftsmanship". The cost of the material, copying time required for the scribes, and binding, is estimated to have equalled the lifetime wages of one individual at the time.

Throughout the New Testament portion, the words are written in scriptio continua (words without any spaces in between them) in the hand-writing style that came to be called "biblical uncial" or "biblical majuscule". The parchment was ruled with a sharp point to prepare for writing lines. The letters are written along these lines, with neither breathings nor polytonic accents (markings utilised to indicate changes of pitch or emphasis). A variety of types of punctuation are used: high and middle points; colon; diaeresis on initial iota and upsilon; a few ligatures are used, along with the paragraphos: initial letter into margin (extent of this varies considerably). A plain iota is replaced by the epsilon-iota diphthong almost regularly (commonly though imprecisely known as itacism), e.g. ΔΑΥΕΙΔ instead of ΔΑΥΙΔ, ΠΕΙΛΑΤΟΣ instead of ΠΙΛΑΤΟΣ, ΦΑΡΕΙΣΑΙΟΙ instead of ΦΑΡΙΣΑΙΟΙ, etc.

Nomina sacra with overlines are employed throughout. Some words usually abbreviated in other manuscripts (such as πατηρ and δαυειδ), are written in both full and abbreviated forms. The following nomina sacra are written in abbreviated forms (nominative forms shown): Θ̅Σ̅ (θεος / god), Κ̅Σ̅ (κυριος / lord), Ι̅Σ̅ (Ιησους / Jesus), Χ̅Σ̅ (χριστος / Christ), Π̅Ν̅Α̅ (πνευμα / spirit), Π̅Ν̅Ι̅Κ̅Ο̅Σ̅ (πνευματικος / spiritual), Υ̅Σ̅ (υιος / son), Α̅Ν̅Ο̅Σ̅ (ανθρωπος / man), Ο̅Υ̅Ο̅Σ̅ (ουρανος / heaven), Δ̅Α̅Δ̅ (Δαυιδ / David), Ι̅Λ̅Η̅Μ̅ (Ιερουσαλημ / Jerusalem), Ι̅Σ̅Ρ̅Λ̅ (Ισραηλ / Israel), Μ̅Η̅Ρ̅ (μητηρ / mother), Π̅Η̅Ρ̅ (πατηρ / father), Σ̅Ω̅Ρ̅ (σωτηρ / saviour).

The portion of the codex held by the British Library consists of 346½ folios, 694 pages (38.1 cm x 34.5 cm), constituting over half of the original work. Of these folios, 199 belong to the Old Testament, including the apocrypha (deuterocanonical), and 147½ belong to the New Testament, along with two other books, the Epistle of Barnabas and part of The Shepherd of Hermas. The apocryphal and deuterocanonical books present in the surviving part of the Septuagint are 2 Esdras, Tobit, Judith, 1 and 4 Maccabees, Wisdom, and Sirach. The books of the New Testament are arranged in this order: the four Gospels, the epistles of Paul (Hebrews follows 2 Thess.), the Acts of the Apostles, (Note: Here and in Minuscule 69, Minuscule 336, and several other manuscripts, the Pauline epistles precede Acts.) the General Epistles, and the Book of Revelation. The fact that some parts of the codex are preserved in good condition while others are in very poor condition suggests they were separated and stored in several places.

While large portions of the Old Testament are missing, it is assumed the codex originally contained the whole of both Testaments. About half of the Greek Old Testament (or Septuagint) survived, along with a complete New Testament, the entire Deuterocanonical books, the Epistle of Barnabas and portions of The Shepherd of Hermas.

== Text ==
=== Contents ===
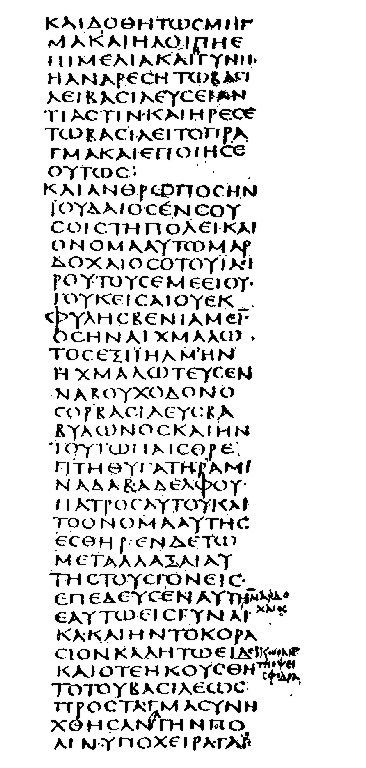
A portion of Codex Sinaiticus, containing Esther

The text of the Old Testament contains the following passages in order:

1	Genesis 23:19 – Genesis 24:46 – fragments	13	4 Maccabees
2	Leviticus 20:27 – Leviticus 22:30	14	Book of Isaiah
3	Numbers – fragments	15	Book of Jeremiah
4	Book of Deuteronomy - fragments	16	Book of Lamentations
5	Book of Joshua - fragments	17	Minor Prophets (omitting Book of Hosea)
6	Book of Judges 5:7 - 11:2 + fragments	18	Book of Psalms
7	1 Chronicles 9:27–1 Chronicles 19:17	19	Book of Proverbs
8	Ezra–Nehemiah (from Esdr. 9:9).	20	Ecclesiastes
9	Book of Esther	21	Song of Songs
10	Book of Tobit	22	Wisdom of Solomon
11	Book of Judith	23	Wisdom of Sirach
12	1 Maccabees	24	Book of Job

The text of the New Testament is arranged in the following order:

1	Gospel of Matthew	10	Philippians	19	Acts
2	Gospel of Mark	11	Colossians	20	James
3	Gospel of Luke	12	1 Thessalonians	21	1 Peter
4	Gospel of John	13	2 Thessalonians	22	2 Peter
5	Romans	14	Hebrews	23	1 John
6	1 Corinthians	15	1 Timothy	24	2 John
7	2 Corinthians	16	2 Timothy	25	3 John
8	Galatians	17	Titus	26	Jude
9	Ephesians	18	Philemon	27	Revelation

The codex includes two other books as part of the New Testament:

- Epistle of Barnabas
- Shepherd of Hermas

=== Text-type and relationship to other manuscripts ===
The inter-relationship between various significant ancient manuscripts of the Old Testament (some identified by their siglum). LXX here denotes the original Septuagint; א (aleph) denotes the Codex Sinaiticus

For most of the New Testament, Codex Sinaiticus is in general agreement with Codex Vaticanus (B) and Codex Ephraemi Rescriptus (C), attesting the Alexandrian text-type. A notable example of an agreement between the text in Sinaiticus and Vaticanus is they both omit the word εικη ('without cause', 'without reason', 'in vain') from Matthew 5:22: "But I say unto you, that whosoever is angry with his brother without a cause shall be in danger of the judgement". (Note: The same variant is present in the Greek manuscript 𝔓^{64}, noted in the margin of Minuscule 1424, present in manuscripts of the Latin Vulgate, the Ethiopic version, and attested by the early Church Fathers Origen and Jerome - NA27 p. 10.)

In John 1:1–8:38, Codex Sinaiticus differs from Vaticanus (B) and all other Alexandrian manuscripts. It is in closer agreement with Codex Bezae (D) in support of the Western text-type. For example, in John 1:4, Sinaiticus and Codex Bezae are the only Greek manuscripts with textual variant ἐν αὐτῷ ζωὴ ἐστίν (in him is life) instead of ἐν αὐτῷ ζωὴ ᾓν (in him was life). This variant is supported by Vetus Latina and some Sahidic manuscripts. This portion has a large number of corrections. There are a number of differences between Sinaiticus and Vaticanus; Textual critic Herman C. Hoskier enumerated 3036 differences:

Matt: 656
Mark: 567
Luke: 791
John: 1022
Total — 3036.

According to textual critic Fenton Hort, Sinaiticus and Vaticanus were derived from a much older common source, "the date of which cannot be later than the early part of the second century, and may well be yet earlier".

Example of differences between Sinaiticus and Vaticanus in Matt 1:18–19 (one transposition difference; two spelling differences; one word substitution difference):

Codex Sinaiticus	Codex Vaticanus
Του δε Ι̅Υ̅ Χ̅Υ̅ η γενεσις ουτως ην μνηστευθισης της μητρος αυτου Μαριας τω Ιωσηφ πριν ην συνελθιν αυτους ευρεθη εν γαστρι εχουσα εκ Π̅Ν̅Σ̅ αγιου Ιωσηφ δε ο ανηρ αυτης δικαιος ων και μη θελων αυτην παραδιγματισαι εβουληθη λαθρα απολυσαι αυτην	Του δε Χ̅Υ̅ Ι̅Υ̅ η γενεσις ουτως ην μνηστευθεισης της μητρος αυτου Μαριας τω Ιωσηφ πριν ην συνελθειν αυτους ευρεθη εν γαστρι εχουσα εκ Π̅Ν̅Σ̅ αγιου Ιωσηφ δε ο ανηρ αυτης δικαιος ων και μη θελων αυτην δειγματισαι εβουληθη λαθρα απολυσαι αυτην
English Translation	English Translation
Now the birth of Jesus Christ was as follows: was betrothed His mother Mary to Joseph. Before they had sexual intercourse, she was found to be pregnant by the Holy Spirit. As Joseph her husband was righteous and did not want to publicly shame her, he planned to divorce her quietly.	Now the birth of Christ Jesus was as follows: was betrothed His mother Mary to Joseph. Before they had sexual intercourse, she was found to be pregnant by the Holy Spirit. As Joseph her husband was righteous and did not want to make a show of her, he planned to divorce her quietly.

Biblical scholar B. H. Streeter remarked there was a great agreement between the codex and the Vulgate of Jerome. According to him, Origen brought the Alexandrian text-type that was used in this codex to Caesarea, and it was subsequently employed by Jerome for his Latin revision.

Between the 4th and 12th centuries, seven or more correctors worked on this codex, making it one of the most corrected manuscripts in existence. During his investigation in Petersburg, Tischendorf enumerated 14,800 corrections in the portion which was only held in Petersburg (2/3 of the codex). According to textual critic David C. Parker, the full codex has about 23,000 corrections. In addition to these corrections some letters were marked by dots as doubtful (e.g. ṪḢ).

=== Notable omissions ===
The New Testament portion lacks the following passages:

Omitted verses
- Gospel of Matthew

Matthew 12:47 - א* B L Γ pc ff^{1} k sy^{s}^{, c} sa
Matthew 16:2b-3 - א B ƒ^{13} 157 sy^{c} sa bo
Matthew 17:21 - א* B Θ 0281 33 579 892* pc e ff^{1} sy^{s}^{, c} sa bo^{pt}
Matthew 18:11 - א B L* Θ* ƒ^{1} ƒ^{13} 33 892* pc e ff^{1} sy^{s} sa mae bo^{pt} ; Ori Eus
Matthew 23:14 - א B D L Z Θ ƒ^{1} 33 892* pc a aur e ff^{1} g^{1} vg^{st, ww} sy^{s} sa mae bo^{pt}

- Gospel of Mark

Mark 7:16 - א B L Δ*
Mark 9:44 - א B C W it^{k} sy^{s} sa
Mark 9:46 - א B C W it^{k} sy^{s} sa
Mark 11:25 - א B L W Δ Ψ 565 700 892 it^{k l} sy^{s} sa bo^{pt}
Mark 15:28 - א A B C D Ψ it^{k} sy^{s} sa bo^{pt}
Mark 16:9–20 (Long ending of the Gospel Mark) - א B it^{k} sy^{s} arm

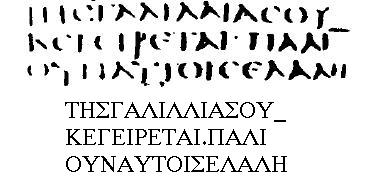
John 7:52–8:12 without the pericope 7:53–8:11 in Sinaiticus

- Gospel of Luke

Luke 10:32 - א* (Likely omitted due to haplography resulting from homeoteleuton; the verse was added by a later corrector in lower margin)
Luke 17:36 - א 𝔓^{75} A B L W Δ Θ Ψ ƒ^{1} 28 33 565

- Gospel of John

- א 𝔓^{66} 𝔓^{75} B C* D W^{supp} Minuscule 33 it^{d l q} vg sy^{c} sa bo^{mss}
John 7:53-8:11 (Pericope adulterae) - א 𝔓^{66} 𝔓^{75} B L N T W X Y Δ Θ Ψ 0141 0211 22 33 124 157 209 788 828 1230 1241 1253 2193 (See image at right.);

- The Book of Acts - א 𝔓^{45} 𝔓^{74} A B C 33 81 614 vg sy^{p}^{, h} sa bo eth

Acts 15:34 - א 𝔓^{74} A B E L Ψ 81 1241 1505 Byz
Acts 24:7 - א 𝔓^{74} A B H L P 049 81 1175 1241 it^{p* s} vg^{st} co
Acts 28:29 - א 𝔓^{74} A B E Ψ 048 33 81 1175 1739 2464 it^{s} vg^{st} sy^{p} co

- Epistle of Paul to the Romans 16:24 - א 𝔓^{46} 𝔓^{61} A B C 81 1739 2464 it^{b} vg^{st} co

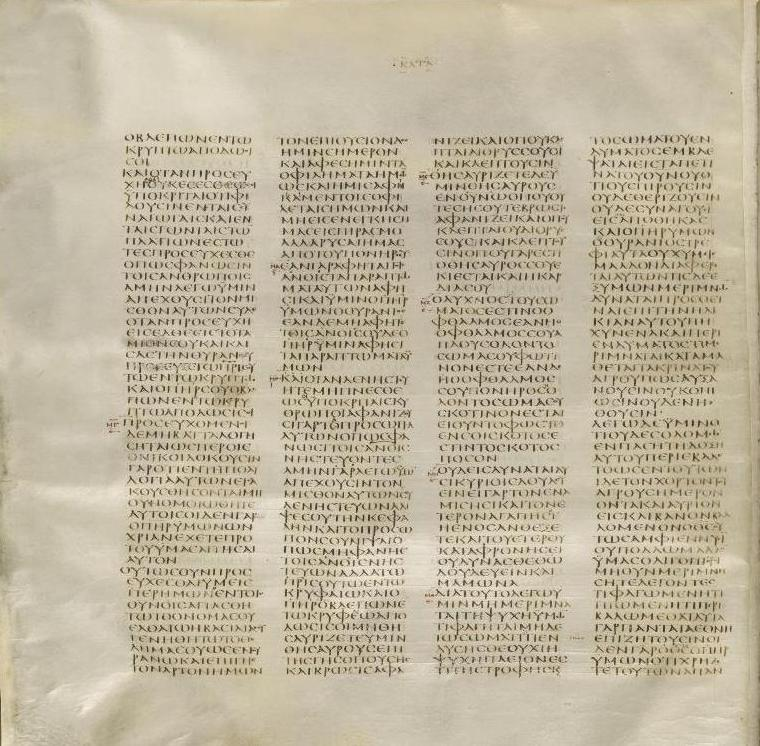
Page of the codex with text of Matthew 6:4–32

Omitted phrases
- Matthew 5:44: εὐλογεῖτε τοὺς καταρωμένους ὑμᾶς, καλῶς ποιεῖτε τοῖς μισοῦσιν ὑμᾶς (bless those who curse you, do good to those who hate you) - א B ƒ^{1} 205 it^{k} sy^{c} sa bo^{pt}
- Matthew 6:13: ὅτι σοῦ ἐστιν ἡ βασιλεία καὶ ἡ δύναμις καὶ ἡ δόξα εἰς τοὺς αἰῶνας. ἀμήν (For Yours is the kingdom, and the power, and the glory, forever. Amen.) - א B D Z 0170 ƒ^{1} 205 l547 it^{a aur b c ff^{1} b l} vg meg bo^{pt} diat^{syr}
- Matthew 10:39: ο ευρων την ψυχην αυτου απολεσει αυτην, και (Ηe who finds his life will lose it, and) - א* (singular reading)
- Matthew 15:6: η την μητερα (αυτου) (or (his) mother) - א B D it^{a c} sy^{c} sa
- Matthew 20:23: και το βαπτισμα ο εγω βαπτιζομαι βαπτισθησεσθε (and be baptized with the baptism that I am baptized with) - א B D L Z Θ 085 ƒ^{1} ƒ^{13} lat sy^{s}^{, c} sa mae bo^{pt}
- Matthew 23:35: υιου βαραχιου (son of Barachi'ah) - א 59* ℓ 6 ℓ 13 ℓ 185, Eus
  υιου θεου (the Son of God) - א Θ 28^{c} ℓ 2211 sy^{p} sa^{ms} arm geo^{1}
- Mark 10:7: και προσκολληθησεται προς την γυναικα αυτου (and be joined to his wife) - א B Ψ 892 ℓ 48 sy^{s} goth
- Luke 9:55-56: καὶ εἶπεν, Οὐκ οἴδατε ποίου πνεύματος ἐστὲ ὑμεῖς; ὁ γὰρ υἱὸς τοῦ ἀνθρώπου οὐκ ἦλθεν ψυχὰς ἀνθρώπων ἀπολέσαι ἀλλὰ σῶσαι (and He said: "You do not know what manner of spirit you are of; for the Son of man came not to destroy men's lives but to save them) - א 𝔓^{45} 𝔓^{75} B C L Θ Ξ 33 700 892 1241 sy bo
- John 4:9: ου γαρ συνχρωνται Ιουδαιοι Σαμαριταις (Jews have no dealings with Samaritans) - א* D a b e j fay (א^{c} includes the phrase)

Some passages/phrases were excluded by the correctors:

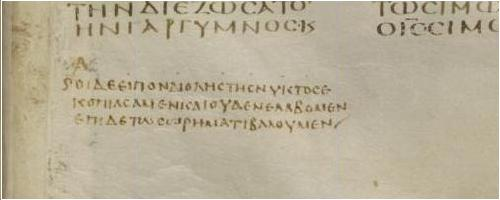
Additional phrase to John 21:6 on the margin – οι δε ειπον δι οληϲ τηϲ νυκτοϲ εκοπιαϲαμεν και ουδεν ελαβομεν επι δε τω ϲω ρηματι βαλουμεν

- Matthew 24:36: ουδε ο υιος (nor the Son) - included by the original scribe (as also in B D ƒ^{13} 28 1505 ℓ 547 it^{a aur b c d f ff^{1} ff^{2} h q r} vg^{mss} sy^{p} arm eth geo^{1} Diat), marked by the first corrector (a) as doubtful (omitted also in L W Δ ƒ^{1} 33 157 579 700 892 1424 and majority of manuscripts), but the second corrector (b) removed the mark.
- Mark 10:40: υπο του πατρος μου (by my Father) - included by the original scribe (as also in Θ ƒ^{1} 205 1071 1241 1505 it^{a r1} sy^{h(mg)} bo^{ms} eth), marked by the first corrector as doubtful (omitted also in A B C D L W Δ Ψ ƒ^{13} 157 and majority of manuscripts), but the second corrector removed the mark.
- Luke 11:4: ἀλλὰ ῥῦσαι ἡμᾶς ἀπὸ τοῦ πονηροῦ (but deliver us from evil) - included by the original scribe (as also in A C D W Δ Θ Ψ ƒ^{13} 28 157 and majority of manuscripts), marked by the first corrector as doubtful (omitted also in 𝔓^{75} B L 1 700 1342 vg sy^{s} sa bo^{pt} arm geo), but the third corrector (c) removed the mark.
- Luke 22:43-44: (Christ's agony at Gethsemane) – included by the original scribe (as also in D L Δ Θ Ψ 0233 ƒ^{1} 157 700 and majority of manuscripts), marked by the first corrector as doubtful (omitted also in 𝔓^{69}^{(vid)} 𝔓^{75} A B N T W 579 it^{f} sy^{s} sa bo^{pt} arm geo), but the third corrector removed the mark.
- Luke 23:34a: ὁ δὲ Ἰησοῦς ἔλεγεν Πάτερ ἄφες αὐτοῖς οὐ γὰρ οἴδασιν τί ποιοῦσιν (Then Jesus said, 'Father, forgive them; for they know not what they do') – included by the original scribe (as also in A C D^{2} L Ψ 0250 ƒ^{1} 33 and majority of manuscripts), marked by the first corrector as doubtful (omitted also in 𝔓^{75} B D* Θ 070 579 1241 it^{a} sy^{s} sa bo^{pt}), but a third corrector removed the mark.

=== Additions ===
Matthew 8:13:

καὶ ὑποστρέψας ὁ ἑκατόνταρχος εἰς τὸν οἶκον αὐτοῦ ἐν αὐτῇ τῇ ὦρᾳ εὗρεν τὸν παῖδα ὑγιαίνοντα (and when the centurion returned to the house in that hour, he found the slave well) - א C (N) Θ (0250) ƒ^{1} (33 1241) g^{1} sy^{h}

Matthew 10:12:

λέγοντες εἰρήνη τῷ οἴκῳ τούτῳ (say peace to be this house - the reading was deleted by the first corrector, but the second corrector restored it) - א^{1} D L W Θ ƒ^{1} 22 1010 (1424) it vg^{cl}.

Matthew 27:49:

ἄλλος δὲ λαβὼν λόγχην ἔνυξεν αὐτοῦ τὴν πλευράν, καὶ ἐξῆλθεν ὕδορ καὶ αἷμα (the other took a spear and pierced His side, and immediately came out water and blood) - א B C L.

=== Unique and other textual variants ===
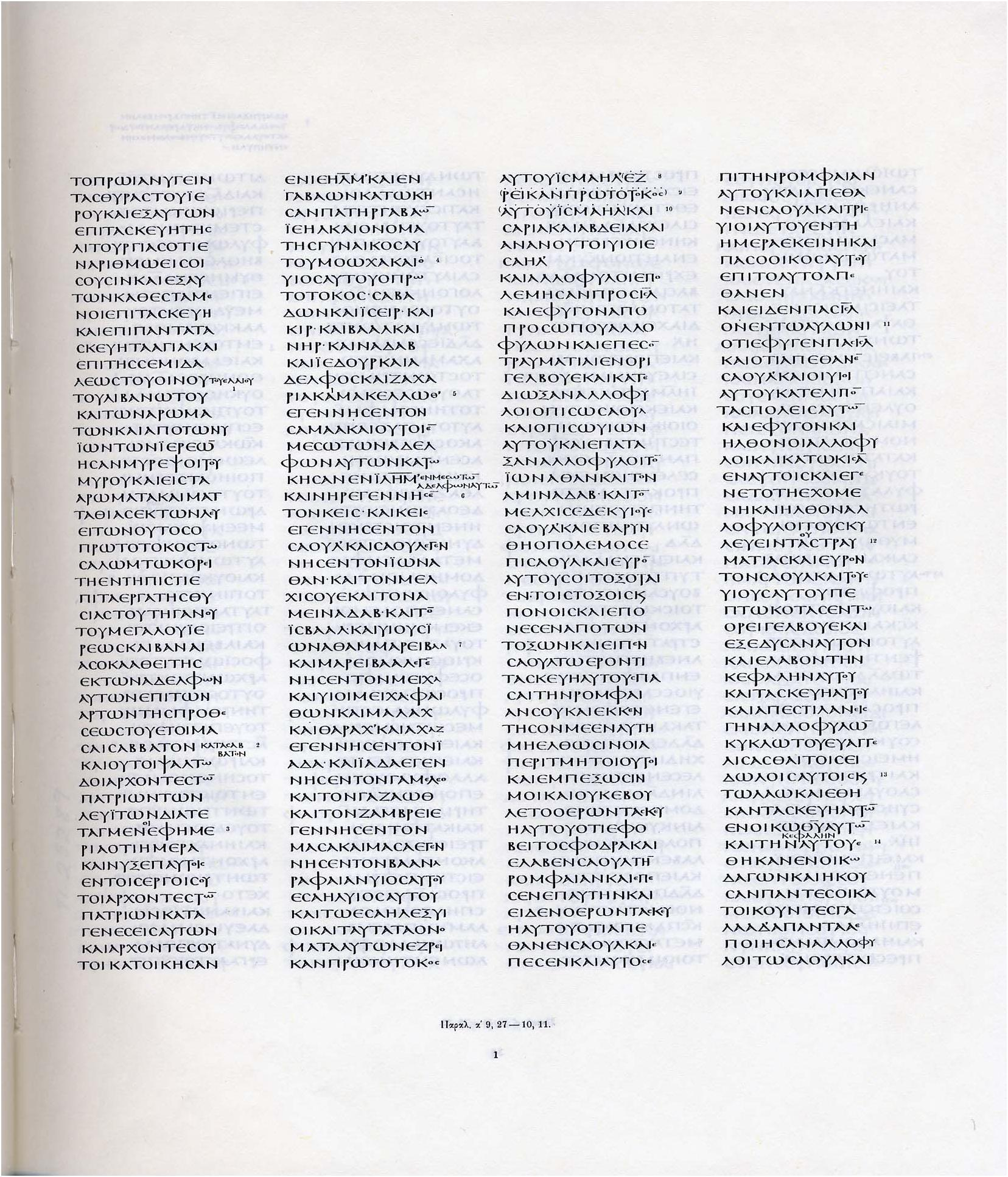
Page from facsimile edition (1862); 1 Chr 9:27–10:11

Matthew 7:22

πολλα (numerous - "and cast out numerous demons in your name?") - א (singular reading)

Matthew 8:12

ἐξελεύσονται (will go out) - א 0250 k sy arm Diatessaron.

Matthew 13:54

εις την αντιπατριδα αυτου (to his own Antipatris) - א (singular reading)

Acts 8:5

εις την πολιν της Καισαριας (to the city of Caesarea) - א (singular reading).

Matthew 16:12

της ζυμης των αρτων των Φαρισαιων και Σαδδουκαιων (leaven of bread of the Pharisees and Sadducees) - א ff^{1} sy^{c}

Luke 1:26

Ιουδαιας (Judaea) – א (singular reading)

Luke 2:37

εβδομηκοντα (seventy) - א (singular reading)

John 1:28

Βηθαραβα (Betharaba - a correction by the second corrector; originally reads Βηθανια (Bethany) ) - א 892 sy^{h(mg)}

John 1:34

ὁ ἐκλεκτός (chosen one) - א 𝔓^{5} 𝔓^{106} b e ff^{2} sy^{c}^{, s}

John 2:3

οινον ουκ ειχον οτι συνετελεσθη ο οινος του γαμου (they had no wine, because the wine of the marriage feast was finished) - א a j

John 6:10

τρισχιλιοι (three thousands) - א* (singular reading). Amended to πεντακισχιλιοι (five thousand) by the second corrector.

Acts 11:20

εὐαγγελιστας (Evangelists) - א (singular reading)

Acts 14:9

ουκ ηκουσεν (not heard) - א (singular reading)

Hebrews 2:4

θερισμοις (harvests) - א (singular reading)

1 Peter 5:13

εκκλησια (Church) - א vg^{mss} sy^{p}

2 Timothy 4:10

Γαλλιαν (Gaul) - א C 81 104 326 436

=== Variants in agreement with the "majority text" ===
Mark 10:19

μη αποστερησης (do not defraud)

incl. - א B^{(c2)} Majority of manuscripts
omit - B* K W Ψ f^{1} f^{13} 28 700 1010 1079 1242 1546 2148 ℓ 10 ℓ 950 ℓ 1642 ℓ 1761 sy^{s} arm geo.

Mark 13:33

και προσευχεσθε (and pray)

incl. - א Majority of manuscripts
omit - B D.

Luke 8:48

θυγατερ (daughter) - א Majority of manuscripts
θυγατηρ (daughter) - B K L W Θ.

=== Orthodox-Belief supporting reading ===
1 John 5:6

δι' ὕδατος καὶ αἵματος καὶ πνεύματος (through water and blood and spirit) - also in A 104 424^{c} 614 1739^{c} 2412 2495 ℓ 598^{m} sy^{h} sa bo Origen. (Note: For other variants in this verse see: Textual variants in the First Epistle of John.) Bart D. Ehrman says this was a corrupt reading from a proto-orthodox scribe, although this conclusion has not gained wide support.

== History ==
=== Early history ===
==== Provenance ====
Little is known of the manuscript's early history. According to Hort, it was written in the West, probably in Rome, as suggested by the fact that the chapter division in the Acts of the Apostles common to Sinaiticus and Vaticanus occurs in no other Greek manuscript, but is found in several manuscripts of the Latin Vulgate. Robinson countered this argument, suggesting that this system of chapter divisions was introduced into the Vulgate by Jerome himself, as a result of his studies at Caesarea. According to Kenyon the forms of the letters are Egyptian and they were found in Egyptian papyri of earlier date. Gardthausen, Ropes and Jellicoe thought it was written in Egypt. Biblical scholar J. Rendel Harris believed that the manuscript came from the library of Pamphilus at Caesarea Maritima. Streeter, Skeat, and Milne also believed that it was produced in Caesarea.

==== Date ====
The codex can be dated with a reasonable degree of confidence between the early fourth century and the early fifth century. It could not have been written before about 325 because it contains the Eusebian Canons, which is a terminus post quem. The terminus ante quem is less certain. Milne and Skeat relied on small cursive notes to assert that the date of the production of the codex was not likely to be much later than about 360. More recent research suggests that these cursive notes could be as late as the early fifth century.

Tischendorf theorized that Codex Sinaiticus was one of the fifty copies of the Bible commissioned from Eusebius by Roman emperor Constantine after his conversion to Christianity (De vita Constantini, IV, 37). This hypothesis was supported by Pierre Batiffol. Biblical scholars Caspar René Gregory and T.C. Skeat believed that it was already in production when Constantine placed his order, but had to be suspended in order to accommodate different page dimensions.

Biblical scholar Frederic G. Kenyon argued: "There is not the least sign of either of them ever having been at Constantinople. The fact that Sinaiticus was collated with the manuscript of Pamphilus so late as the sixth century seems to show that it was not originally written at Caesarea".

==== Scribes and correctors ====
Tischendorf believed four separate scribes copied the work (whom he named A, B, C and D), and five correctors amended portions (whom he designated a, b, c, d and e). He posited one of the correctors was contemporaneous with the original scribes, and the others worked during the sixth and seventh centuries. After Milne and Skeat's reinvestigation, it is now agreed Tischendorf was incorrect, as scribe C never existed. According to Tischendorf, scribe C wrote the poetic books of the Old Testament. These are written in a different format from the rest of the manuscript – they appear in two columns (the rest of books is in four columns), written stichometrically. Tischendorf probably interpreted the different formatting as indicating the existence of another scribe. The three remaining scribes are still identified by the letters Tischendorf gave them: A, B, and D. There were in fact more correctors, with at least seven (a, b, c, ca, cb, cc, e).

Modern analysis identifies three scribes:

- Scribe A wrote most of the historical and poetical books of the Old Testament; almost the whole of the New Testament; and the Epistle of Barnabas
- Scribe B was responsible for the Prophets and for the Shepherd of Hermas
- Scribe D wrote the whole of Tobit and Judith; the first half of 4 Maccabees; the first two-thirds of the Psalms; and the first five verses of Revelation

Scribe B was a poor speller, and scribe A was not much better; the best scribe was D. Metzger states: "scribe A had made some unusually serious mistakes". Scribes A and B used nomina sacra in contracted forms most often (ΠΝΕΥΜΑ contracted in all occurrences, ΚΥΡΙΟΣ contracted except in two occurrences), whereas scribe D mostly used the uncontracted forms. Scribe D distinguished between sacral and nonsacral uses of ΚΥΡΙΟΣ. His spelling errors are the substitution of ΕΙ for Ι, and Ι for ΕΙ in medial positions, both equally common. Otherwise substitution of Ι for initial ΕΙ is unknown, and final ΕΙ is only replaced in the word ΙΣΧΥΕΙ. The confusion of Ε and ΑΙ is very rare. In the Book of Psalms, this scribe has ΔΑΥΕΙΔ instead of ΔΑΥΙΔ 35 times, while scribe A normally uses an abbreviated form Δ̅Α̅Δ̅. Scribe A made the most phonetic errors: confusion of Ε and ΑΙ occurs in all contexts. Milne and Skeat characterised scribe B as "careless and illiterate".

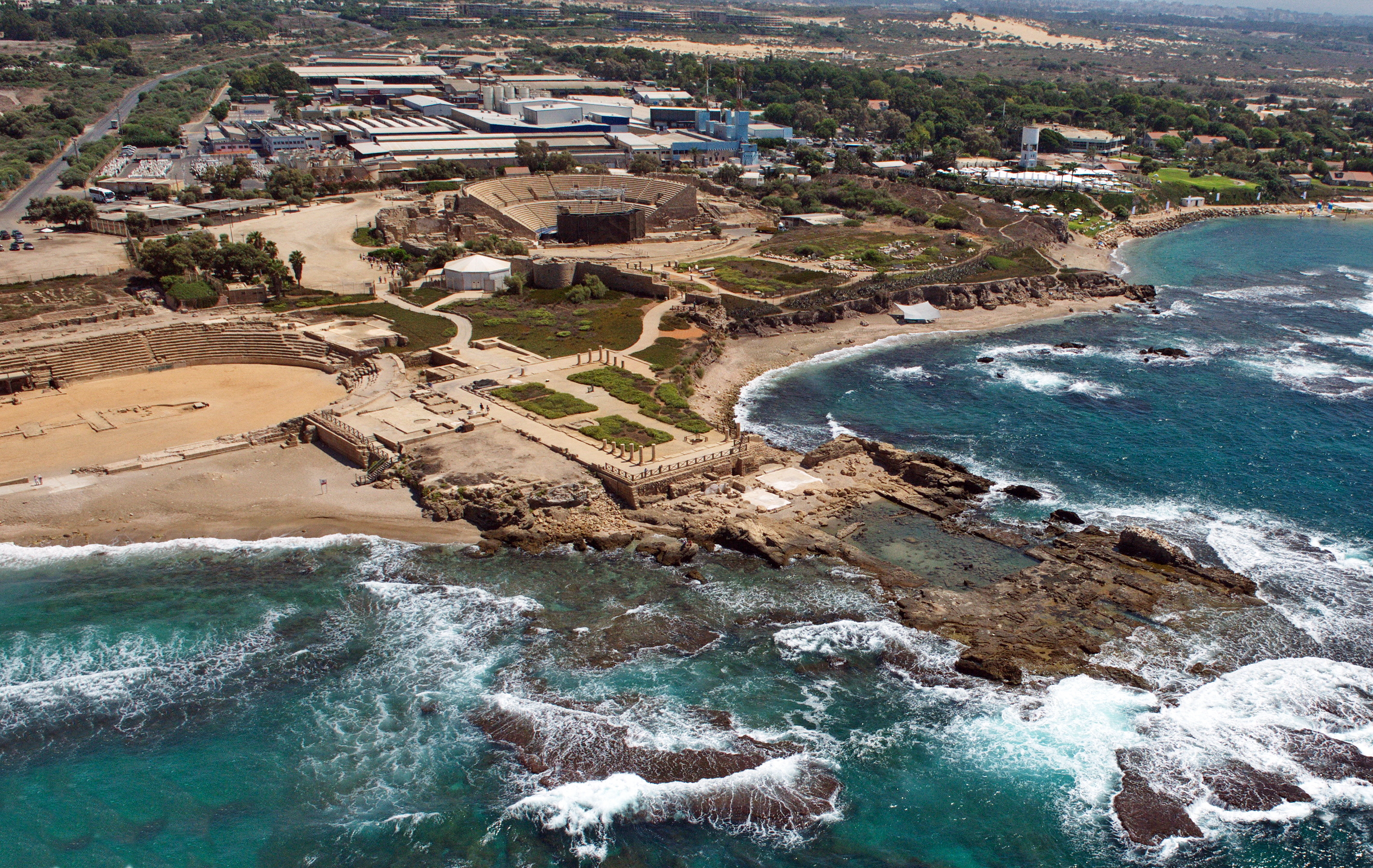
In the sixth or seventh century, the codex may have been housed at Caesarea.

A paleographical study at the British Museum in 1938 found the text had undergone several corrections. The first corrections were done by several scribes before the manuscript left the scriptorium. Readings which they introduced are designated by the siglum א^{a}. Milne and Skeat have observed the superscription to 1 Maccabees was made by scribe D, while the text was written by scribe A. Scribe D corrects his own work and that of scribe A, but scribe A limits himself to correcting his own work. In the sixth or seventh century, many alterations were made (א^{b}) – according to a colophon at the end of the book of Esdras and Esther, the source of these alterations was "a very ancient manuscript that had been corrected by the hand of the holy martyr Pamphylus" (martyred in 309). If this is so, material beginning with 1 Samuel to the end of Esther is Origen's copy of the Hexapla. From this colophon, the corrections are concluded to have been made in Caesarea Maritima in the sixth or seventh centuries. The pervasive iotacism, especially of the ει diphthong, remains uncorrected.

=== Discovery ===
The Codex may have been seen in 1761 by the Italian traveller Vitaliano Donati, when he visited the Saint Catherine's Monastery at Sinai in Egypt. His diary was published in 1879, in which was written:

In questo monastero ritrovai una quantità grandissima di codici membranacei... ve ne sono alcuni che mi sembravano anteriori al settimo secolo, ed in ispecie una Bibbia in membrane bellissime, assai grandi, sottili, e quadre, scritta in carattere rotondo e bellissimo; conservano poi in chiesa un Evangelistario greco in caractere d'oro rotondo, che dovrebbe pur essere assai antico.

In this monastery I found a great number of parchment codices ... there are some which seemed to be written before the seventh century, and especially a Bible (made) of beautiful vellum, very large, thin and square parchments, written in round and very beautiful letters; moreover there are also in the church a Greek Evangelistarium in gold and round letters, it should be very old.

The "Bible on beautiful vellum" may be Codex Sinaiticus, and the gold evangelistarium is likely Lectionary 300 on the Gregory-Aland list.

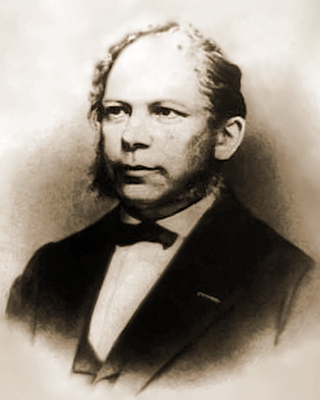
Tischendorf in 1870

German Biblical scholar Constantin von Tischendorf wrote about his visit to the monastery in Reise in den Orient in 1846 (translated as Travels in the East in 1847), without mentioning the manuscript. Later, in 1860, in his writings about the Sinaiticus discovery, Tischendorf wrote a narrative about the monastery and the manuscript that spanned from 1844 to 1859. He wrote that in 1844, during his first visit to the Saint Catherine's Monastery, he saw some leaves of parchment in a waste-basket. They were "rubbish which was to be destroyed by burning it in the ovens of the monastery", although this is firmly denied by the Monastery. After examination he realized that they were part of the Septuagint, written in an early Greek uncial script. He retrieved from the basket 129 leaves in Greek which he identified as coming from a manuscript of the Septuagint. He asked if he might keep them, but at this point the attitude of the monks changed. They realized how valuable these old leaves were, and Tischendorf was permitted to take only one-third of the whole, i.e. 43 leaves. These leaves contained portions of 1 Chronicles, Jeremiah, Nehemiah, and Esther. After his return they were deposited in the Leipzig University Library, where they remain. In 1846 Tischendorf published their contents, naming them the 'Codex Friderico-Augustanus' (in honor of Frederick Augustus and keeping secret the source of the leaves). Other portions of the same codex remained in the monastery, containing all of Isaiah and 1 and 4 Maccabees.

In 1845, Archimandrite Porphyrius Uspensky (1804–1885), at that time head of the Russian Ecclesiastical Mission in Jerusalem and subsequently Bishop of Chigirin, visited the monastery and the codex was shown to him, together with leaves which Tischendorf had not seen. (Note: Uspienski described: "Первая рукопись, содержащая Ветхий Завет неполный и весь Новый Завет с посланием ап. Варнавы и книгой Ермы, писана на тончайшем белом пергаменте. (...) Буквы в ней совершенно похожи на церковно-славянские. Постановка их прямая и сплошная. Над словами нет придыханий и ударений, а речения не отделяются никакими знаками правописания кроме точек. Весь священный текст писан в четыре и два столбца стихомерным образом и так слитно, как будто одно длинное речение тянется от точки до точки." (Порфирий (Успенский), Первое путешествие в Синайский монастырь в 1845 году, Petersburg 1856, с. 226.)) In 1846, Captain C. K. MacDonald visited Mount Sinai, saw the codex, and bought two codices (495 and 496) from the monastery.

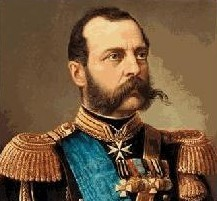
The codex was presented to Alexander II of Russia.

In 1853, Tischendorf revisited the Saint Catherine's Monastery to get the remaining 86 folios, but without success. Returning in 1859, this time under the patronage of Tsar Alexander II of Russia, he was shown Codex Sinaiticus. He would later claim to have found it discarded in a rubbish bin. (This story may have been a fabrication, or the manuscripts in question may have been unrelated to Codex Sinaiticus: Rev. J. Silvester Davies in 1863 quoted "a monk of Sinai who... stated that according to the librarian of the monastery the whole of Codex Sinaiticus had been in the library for many years and was marked in the ancient catalogues... Is it not likely... that a manuscript known in the library catalogue would have been jettisoned in the rubbish basket." Indeed, it has been noted that the leaves were in "suspiciously good condition" for something found in the trash. (Note: Davies' words are from a letter published in The Guardian on 27 May 1863, as quoted by Elliott, J.K. (1982) in Codex Sinaiticus and the Simonides Affair, Thessaloniki: Patriarchal Institute for Patristic Studies, p. 16; Elliott in turn is quoted by Michael D. Peterson in his essay "Tischendorf and the Codex Sinaiticus: the Saga Continues", in The Church and the Library, ed. Papademetriou and Sopko Boston: Somerset Hall Press (2005), p. 77. See also notes 2 and 3, p. 90, in Papademetriou.)) Tischendorf had been sent to search for manuscripts by Russia's Tsar Alexander II, who was convinced there were still manuscripts to be found at the Sinai monastery. The text of this part of the codex was published by Tischendorf in 1862:

- Konstantin von Tischendorf: Bibliorum codex Sinaiticus Petropolitanus. Giesecke & Devrient, Leipzig 1862.

This work has been digitised in full and all four volumes may be consulted online. It was reprinted in four volumes in 1869:

- Konstantin von Tischendorf, G. Olms (Hrsg.): Bibliorum codex Sinaiticus Petropolitanus. 1. Prolegomena. G. Olms, Hildesheim 1869 (Repr.).
- Konstantin von Tischendorf, G. Olms (Hrsg.): Bibliorum codex Sinaiticus Petropolitanus. 2. Veteris Testamenti pars prior. G. Olms, Hildesheim 1869 (Repr.).
- Konstantin von Tischendorf, G. Olms (Hrsg.): Bibliorum codex Sinaiticus Petropolitanus. 3. Veteris Testamenti pars posterior. G. Olms, Hildesheim 1869 (Repr.).
- Konstantin von Tischendorf, G. Olms (Hrsg.): Bibliorum codex Sinaiticus Petropolitanus. 4. Novum Testamentum cum Barnaba et Pastore. G. Olms, Hildesheim 1869 (Repr.).

The complete publication of the codex was made by Kirsopp Lake in 1911 (New Testament), and in 1922 (Old Testament). It was the full-sized black and white facsimile of the manuscript, "made from negatives taken from St. Petersburg by my wife and myself in the summer of 1908".

The story of how Tischendorf found the manuscript, which contained most of the Old Testament and all of the New Testament, has all the interest of a romance. Tischendorf reached the monastery on 31 January; but his inquiries appeared to be fruitless. On 4 February, he had resolved to return home without having gained his object:

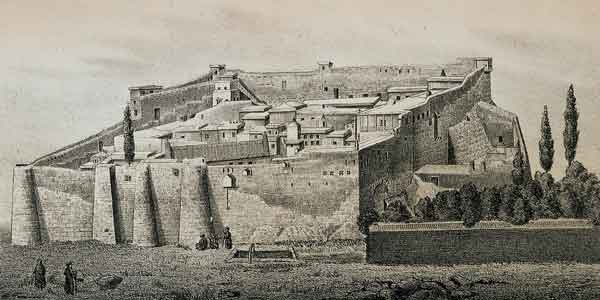
Lithograph of Saint Catherine's Monastery, based on sketches made by Porphyrius Uspensky in 1857

On the afternoon of this day I was taking a walk with the steward of the convent in the neighbourhood, and as we returned, towards sunset, he begged me to take some refreshment with him in his cell. Scarcely had he entered the room, when, resuming our former subject of conversation, he said: "And I, too, have read a Septuagint" – i.e. a copy of the Greek translation made by the Seventy. And so saying, he took down from the corner of the room a bulky kind of volume, wrapped up in a red cloth, and laid it before me. I unrolled the cover, and discovered, to my great surprise, not only those very fragments which, fifteen years before, I had taken out of the basket, but also other parts of the Old Testament, the New Testament complete, and, in addition, the Epistle of Barnabas and a part of the Shepherd of Hermas.

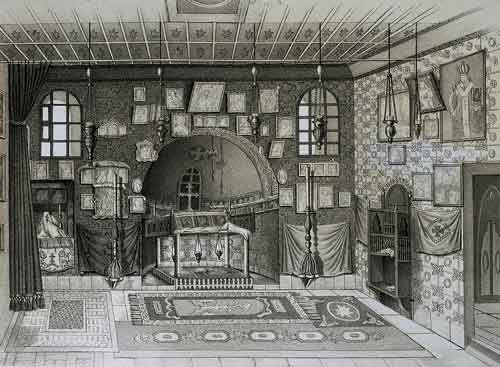
The Chapel of the Burning Bush in Saint Catherine's Monastery; a lithograph from the album of Porphyrius Uspensky

After some negotiations, he obtained possession of this precious fragment. James Bentley gives an account of how this came about, prefacing it with the comment, "Tischendorf therefore now embarked on the remarkable piece of duplicity which was to occupy him for the next decade, which involved the careful suppression of facts and the systematic denigration of the monks of Mount Sinai." He conveyed it to Tsar Alexander II, who appreciated its importance and had it published as nearly as possible in facsimile, so as to exhibit correctly the ancient handwriting. In 1869 the Tsar sent the monastery 7,000 rubles and the monastery of Mount Tabor 2,000 rubles by way of compensation. The document in Russian formalising this was published in 2007 in Russia and has since been translated.

The codex is regarded by the monastery as having been stolen, which is proven by a receipt given by Tischendorf to the authorities at the monastery promising to return the manuscript from St. Petersburg 'to the Holy Confraternity of Sinai at its earliest request', a copy of which is on display in the publicly-accessible area of the monastery. This view of Tischendorf's role in the transfer to Saint Petersburg has been contested by several scholars in Europe. New Testament scholar Bruce Metzger wrote:

Certain aspects of the negotiations leading to the transfer of the codex to the Tsar's possession are open to an interpretation that reflects adversely on Tischendorf's candour and good faith with the monks at Saint Catherine's Monastery. For an account intended to exculpate him of blame, see Erhard Lauch's article 'Nichts gegen Tischendorf' in Bekenntnis zur Kirche: Festgabe für Ernst Sommerlath zum 70. Geburtstag (Berlin, c. 1961), pp.15-24; for an account that includes a hitherto [i.e., before 1964] unknown receipt given by Tischendorf to the authorities at the monastery promising to return the manuscript from Saint Petersburg 'to the Holy Confraternity of Sinai at its earliest request,' see Ihor Ševčenko, "New Documents on Tischendorf and the Codex Sinaiticus", published in the journal Scriptorium, xviii (1964), pp. 55–80.

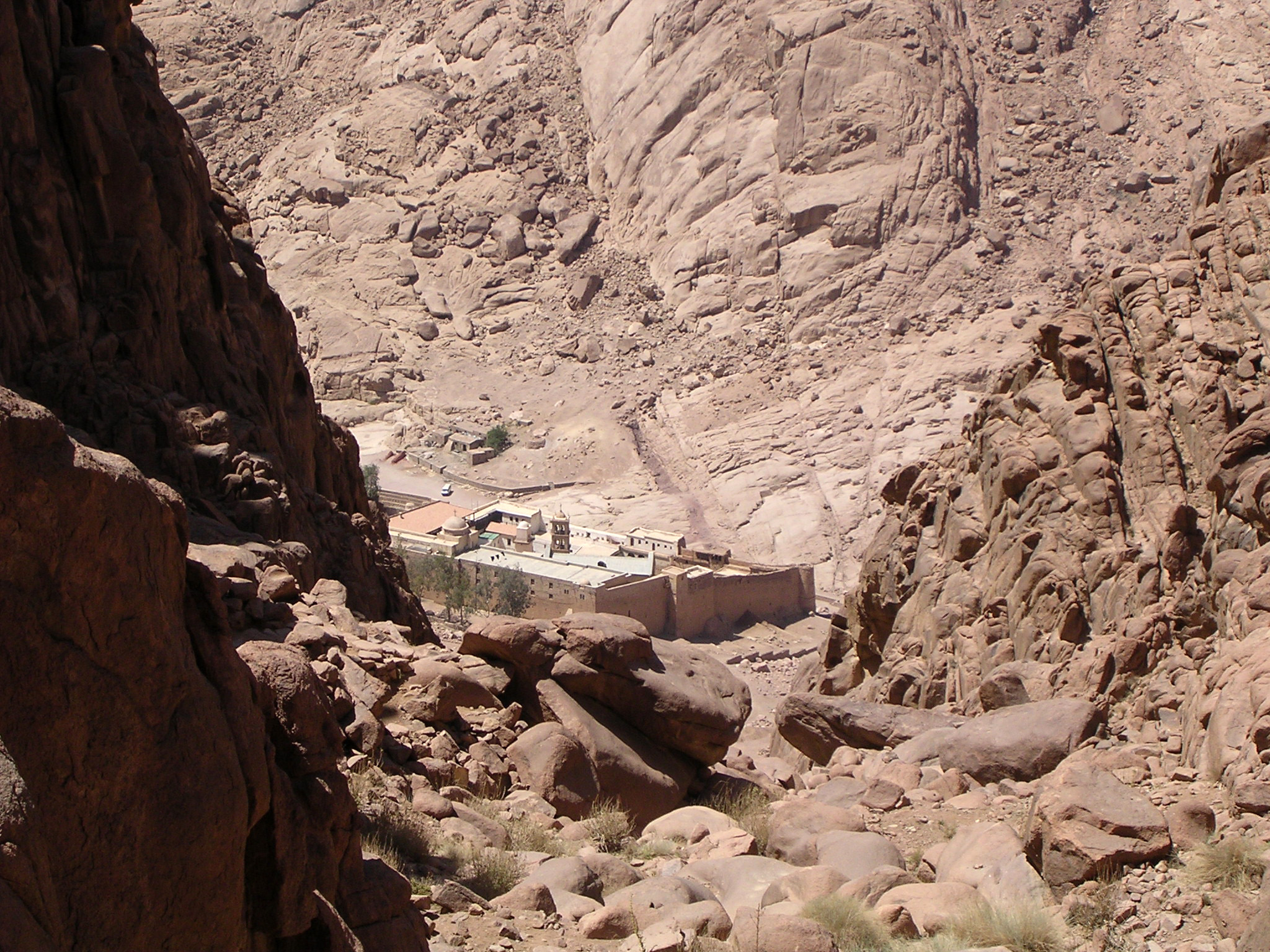
View of Saint Catherine's Monastery

=== Simonides ===
On 13 September 1862 Constantine Simonides (1820–1890), skilled in calligraphy and with a controversial background with manuscripts, made the claim in print in The Manchester Guardian that he had written the codex himself as a 19-year-old boy in 1839 in the Panteleimonos monastery at Athos. Constantin von Tischendorf, who worked with numerous Bible manuscripts, was known as somewhat flamboyant, and had ambitiously sought money from several royal families for his ventures, who had indeed funded his trips. Simonides had a somewhat obscure history, as he claimed he was at Mt. Athos in the years preceding Tischendorf's contact, making the claim at least plausible. Simonides also claimed his father had died and the invitation to Mount Athos came from his uncle, a monk there, but subsequent letters to his father were found among his possessions at his death. Simonides claimed the false nature of the document in The Manchester Guardian in an exchange of letters among scholars and others, at the time. Henry Bradshaw, a British librarian known to both men, defended the Tischendorf find of Codex Sinaiticus, casting aside the accusations of Simonides, which later have been disproved. Since Bradshaw was a social 'hub' among many diverse scholars of the day, his aiding of Tischendorf was given much weight. Simonides died shortly after, and the issue lay dormant for many years.

In answer to Simonides in Allgemeine Zeitung (December 1862), Tischendorf noted only in the New Testament were there many differences between it and all other manuscripts. Henry Bradshaw, a bibliographer, combatted the claims of Constantine Simonides in a letter to The Manchester Guardian (26 January 1863). Bradshaw argued that Codex Sinaiticus brought by Tischendorf from the Greek monastery of Mount Sinai was not a modern forgery or written by Simonides. The controversy seems to regard the misplaced use of the word 'fraud' or 'forgery' since it may have been a repaired text, a copy of the Septuagint based upon Origen's Hexapla, a text which has been rejected for centuries because of its lineage from Eusebius who introduced Arian doctrine into the courts of Constantine I and II.

Not every scholar and Church minister was delighted about the codex find. Burgon, a supporter of the Textus Receptus, suggested that Codex Sinaiticus, as well as codices Vaticanus and Codex Bezae, were the most corrupt documents extant. Each of these three codices "clearly exhibits a fabricated text – is the result of arbitrary and reckless recension." The two most weighty of these three codices, א and B, he likens to the "two false witnesses" of Matthew 26:60.

However, independent discoveries of other fragments of the codex in recent history (see below) prove its authenticity, and disprove all theories of it being a forgery.

=== Recent history ===
In the early 20th century Vladimir Beneshevich (1874–1938) discovered parts of three more leaves of the codex in the bindings of other manuscripts in the library of Mount Sinai. Beneshevich went on three occasions to the monastery (1907, 1908, 1911) but does not tell when or from which book these were recovered. These leaves were also acquired for St. Petersburg, where they remain.

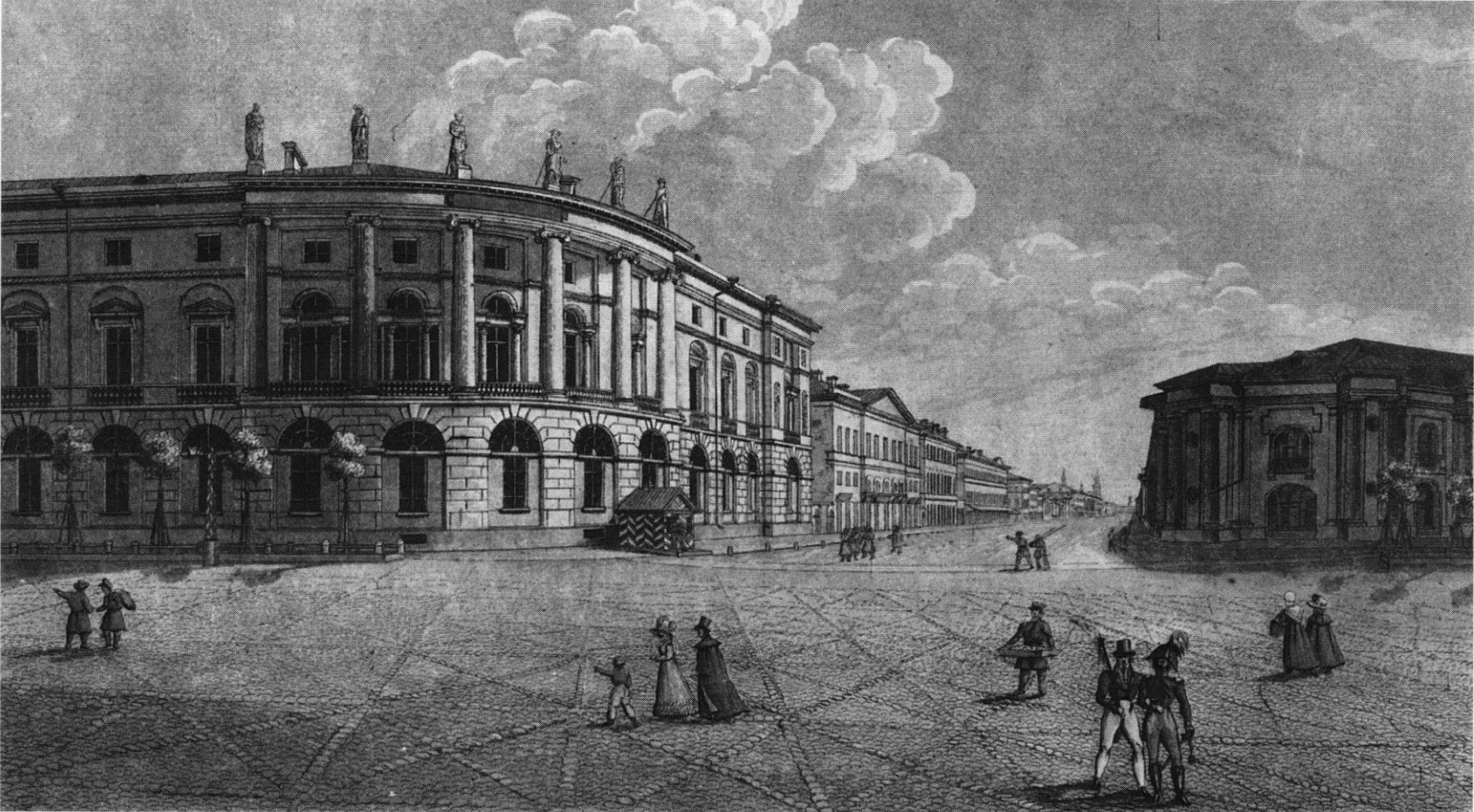
A two-thirds portion of the codex was held in the National Library of Russia in St. Petersburg from 1859 until 1933.

For many decades, the Codex was preserved in the Russian National Library. In 1933, the Soviet Union sold the codex to the British Museum (after 1973 part of it was separated to become the British Library) for £100,000 raised by public subscription (worth £6.2 million in 2025). After coming to Britain it was examined by Skeat and Milne using an ultra-violet lamp.

In May 1975, during restoration work, the monks of Saint Catherine's Monastery discovered a room beneath the St. George Chapel which contained many parchment fragments. Kurt Aland and his team from the Institute for New Testament Textual Research were the first scholars who were invited to analyse, examine and photograph these new fragments of the New Testament in 1982. Among these fragments were twelve complete leaves from the Sinaiticus, eleven leaves of the Pentateuch and one leaf of the Shepherd of Hermas. Together with these leaves 67 Greek Manuscripts of New Testament have been found (uncials 0278 – 0296 and some minuscules).

In June 2005, a team of experts from the United Kingdom, Europe, Egypt, Russia and United States undertook a joint project to produce a new digital edition of the manuscript (involving all four holding libraries), and a series of other studies was announced. This will include the use of hyperspectral imaging to photograph the manuscripts to look for hidden information such as erased or faded text. This was done in cooperation with the British Library.

More than one quarter of the manuscript was made publicly available at The Codex Sinaiticus Website on 24 July 2008. On 6 July 2009, 800 more pages of the manuscript were made available, showing over half of the entire text, although the entire text was intended to be shown by that date.

The complete document is now available online in digital form and available for scholarly study. The online version has a fully transcribed set of digital pages, including amendments to the text, and two images of each page, with both standard lighting and raked lighting to highlight the texture of the parchment.

Prior to 1 September 2009, the University of the Arts London PhD student, Nikolas Sarris, discovered the previously unseen fragment of the Codex in the library of Saint Catherine's Monastery. It contains the text of Book of Joshua 1:10.

== Present location ==
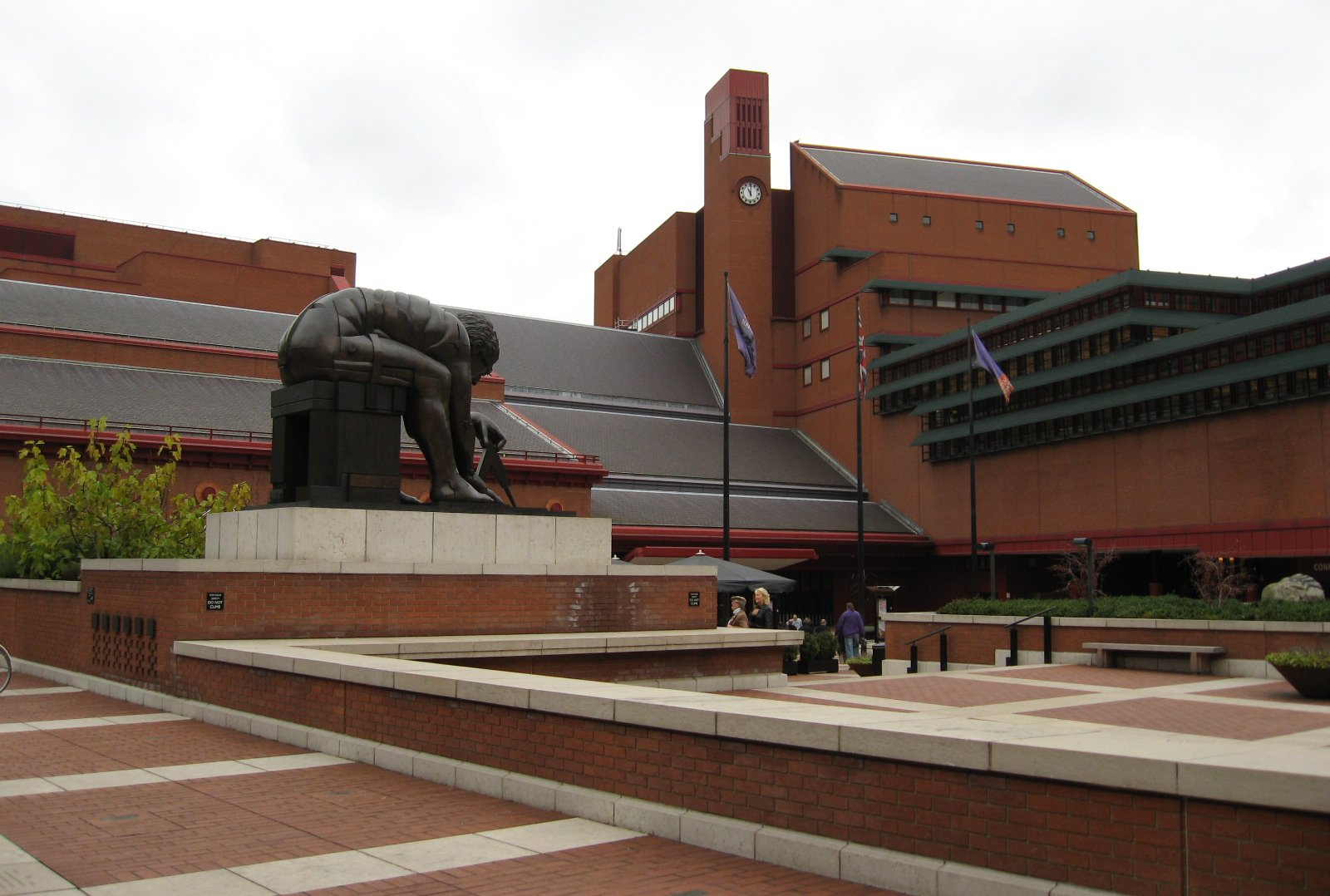
The British Library

The codex is now split into four unequal portions: 347 leaves in the British Library in London (199 of the Old Testament, 148 of the New Testament), 12 leaves and 14 fragments in Saint Catherine's Monastery, 43 leaves in the Leipzig University Library, and fragments of 3 leaves in the Russian National Library in Saint Petersburg.

Saint Catherine's Monastery still maintains the importance of a letter, handwritten in 1844 with an original signature of Tischendorf confirming that he borrowed those leaves and that they would be returned from Russia if requested. However, Russian scholars contend that recently published documents, including a deed of gift dated 11 September 1868 (four years after the removal of the manuscript from the monastery) and signed by Archbishop Kallistratos and the monks of the monastery, amount to a proof that the manuscript was obtained legally. This deed, which agrees with a report by Kurt Aland on the matter, has now been published. This development is not widely known in the English-speaking world, as only German- and Russian-language media reported on it in 2009. Doubts as to the legality of the gift arose because when Tischendorf originally removed the manuscript from Saint Catherine's Monastery in September 1859, the monastery was without an archbishop, so that even though the intention to present the manuscript to the Tsar had been expressed, no legal gift could be made at the time. Resolution of the matter was delayed through the turbulent reign of Archbishop Cyril (consecrated 7 December 1859, deposed 24 August 1866). Skeat in his article "The Last Chapter in the History of the Codex Sinaiticus" concluded in this way:

This is not the place to pass judgements, but perhaps I may say that, as it seems to me, both the monks and Tischendorf deserve our deepest gratitude, Tischendorf for having alerted the monks to the importance of the manuscript, and the monks for having undertaken the daunting task of searching through the vast mass of material with such spectacular results, and then doing everything in their power to safeguard the manuscript against further loss. If we accept the statement of Uspensky, that he saw the codex in 1845, the monks must have worked very hard to complete their search and bind up the results in so short a period.

== Impact on biblical scholarship ==
Along with Codex Vaticanus, Codex Sinaiticus is considered one of the most valuable manuscripts available, as it is one of the oldest and likely closer to the original text of the Greek New Testament. It is the only uncial manuscript with the complete text of the New Testament, and the only ancient manuscript of the New Testament written in four columns per page which has survived to the present day. With only 300 years separating Codex Sinaiticus and the lifetime of Jesus, it is considered by some to be more accurate than most New Testament copies in preserving readings where almost all manuscripts are assumed by them to be in error.

For the Gospels, Sinaiticus is considered among some people as the second most reliable witness of the text (after Vaticanus); in the Acts of the Apostles, its text is equal to that of Vaticanus; in the Epistles, Sinaiticus is assumed to be the most reliable witness of the text. In the Book of Revelation, however, its text is corrupted and is considered of poor quality, and inferior to the texts of Codex Alexandrinus, 𝔓^{47}, and even some minuscule manuscripts in this place (for example, Minuscule 2053, 2062).

== See also ==
- Biblical manuscript – Handwritten copy of a portion of the Bible
- Codex Sinaiticus Rescriptus – Collection of ancient manuscripts
- Differences between codices Sinaiticus and Vaticanus
- Fifty Bibles of Constantine – Set of books commissioned in 331
- List of New Testament uncials
  - Uncial script – Capital letter-only writing system in Greek and Latin
- Syriac Sinaiticus – Manuscript of the New Testament in Old Syriac
