= List of New Testament minuscules (2001–2100) =

A New Testament minuscule is a copy of a portion of the New Testament written in a small, cursive Greek script (developed from Uncial).

== Legend ==
- The numbers (#) are the now standard system of Caspar René Gregory, often referred to as the Gregory-Aland numbers.
- Included among the cataloged minuscules are the following types of manuscripts, color coded:

Grey represents continuous text manuscripts containing only New Testament portions
Beige represents manuscripts with New Testament portions and a catena (quotations from church fathers)
Light cyan represents manuscripts of single-author commentaries who included the full Scripture text.
Light red represents manuscripts of single-author commentaries who included both the full Scripture text and a catena.
Light purple represents manuscripts of commentaries where the Scripture text was abridged.
White represents manuscript numbers no longer in use.

- Dates are estimated to the nearest 100 year increment where specific date is unknown.
- Content generally only describes sections of the New Testament: Gospels, The Acts of the Apostles (Acts), Pauline epistles, and so on. Sometimes the surviving portion of a codex is so limited that specific books, chapters or even verses can be indicated. Linked articles, where they exist, generally specify content in detail, by verse.
- Digital images are referenced with direct links to the hosting web pages, with the exception of those at the INTF. The quality and accessibility of the images is as follows:

Gold color indicates high resolution color images available online.
Tan color indicates high resolution color images available locally, not online.
Light tan color indicates only a small fraction of manuscript pages with color images available online.
Light gray color indicates black/white or microfilm images available online.
Light blue color indicates manuscript not imaged, and is currently lost or ownership unknown.
Light pink color indicates manuscript destroyed, presumed destroyed, or deemed too fragile to digitize.
Violet color indicates high resolution ultraviolet images available online.

† Indicates the manuscript has damaged or missing pages.
^{P} Indicates only a portion of the books were included.
^{K} Indicates manuscript also includes a commentary.
^{S} Indicates lost portions of manuscript replaced via supplement of a later hand.
^{abs} (abschrift) Indicates manuscript is copy.
[ ] Brackets around Gregory-Aland number indicate the manuscript belongs to an already numbered manuscript, was found to not be a continuous text manuscript, was found to be written in modern Greek versus Koine Greek, was proved a forgery, or has been destroyed.

== Minuscules 2001–2100 ==
#	Date	Contents	Pages	Institution and refs.	City, State	Country	Images
2001	12th	Romans - 2 Corinthians	230	Monastery of Saint John the Theologian, 63	Patmos	Greece	CSNTM
2001	12th	Romans - 2 Corinthians	230	Monastery of Saint John the Theologian, 63	Patmos	Greece	INTF
2002	13th	Theophylact Commentary on 1 Corinthians-Titus	208	Monastery of Saint John the Theologian, 116	Patmos	Greece	CSNTM
2002	13th	Theophylact Commentary on 1 Corinthians-Titus	208	Monastery of Saint John the Theologian, 116	Patmos	Greece	INTF
2003	15th	Pauline epistles †	189	University of Groningen Bibl., Hs. 1	Groningen	Netherlands	INTF
2004	12th	Pauline epistles †	158	Royal Site of San Lorenzo de El Escorial, T. III. 17	San Lorenzo de El Escorial	Spain	INTF
2005	13th	Acts †, Pauline epistles †	100	Royal Site of San Lorenzo de El Escorial, Ψ. III. 2	San Lorenzo de El Escorial	Spain	INTF
2006	10th	Chrysostom Commentary on Romans	256	Vatican Library, Reg.gr.4	Vatican City	Vatican City	DVL, INTF
2007	11th	Pauline epistles†	392	Laurentian Library, Plut.09.10	Florence	Italy	BML, INTF
2008	13th	Zigabenus Commentary on the Pauline Epistles	204	Vatican Library, Vat.gr.636	Vatican City	Vatican City	INTF
2009	16th	Acts †, General Epistles †, Pauline Epistles †	77	Royal Danish Library, Thott. 14, 2°	Copenhagen	Denmark	INTF
2010	14th	Revelation†, 8:23-14:10	8	Trinity College, Ms. 373, p. 151-166 (Ms. 33)	Dublin	Ireland	INTF
2011	12th	Pauline Epistles†	199	National Library, Suppl. Gr. 1264	Paris	France	BnF, INTF
2012	14th	Theodoret Commentary on the Pauline Epistles	195	Library of the Greek Orthodox Patriarchate, Sabas 217	Jerusalem		LOC, INTF, CSNTM
2013	12th	2 Corinthians - 1 Thessalonians†	109	National Library, 138	Athens	Greece	CSNTM
2013	12th	2 Corinthians - 1 Thessalonians†	109	National Library, 138	Athens	Greece	INTF
2014	15th	Andreas of Caesarea Commentary on Revelation	93	Vallicelliana Library, ms.D. 20	Rome	Italy	INTF
2015	15th	Revelation 1:1-17:5†	24	Bodleian Library, MS. Barocci 48, fol. 51-74	Oxford	United Kingdom	DB
2015	15th	Revelation 1:1-17:5†	24	Bodleian Library, MS. Barocci 48, fol. 51-74	Oxford	United Kingdom	INTF
2016	15th	Revelation	24	British Library, Harley MS 5678, fol. 221-244	London	United Kingdom	BL
2016	15th	Revelation	24	British Library, Harley MS 5678, fol. 221-244	London	United Kingdom	INTF
2017	15th	Revelation	16	Saxon State Library, A. 124	Dresden	Germany	SLUB, INTF
2017	15th	Revelation	16	Saxon State Library, A. 124	Dresden	Germany	CSNTM
2018	1300	Andreas of Caesarea Commentary on Revelation	32	Austrian National Library, Theol. gr. 307, fol. 142-173	Vienna	Austria	INTF
2019	13th	Andreas of Caesarea Commentary on Revelation†	56	Victor Emmanuel III National Library, Cod. Neapol. ex Vind. 11	Naples	Italy	INTF
2020	15th	Revelation	25	Vatican Library, Vat.gr.579, fol. 22-46	Vatican City	Vatican City	INTF
2021	15th	Revelation	70	Vatican Library, Reg.gr.68	Vatican City	Vatican City	INTF
2022	14th	Andreas of Caesarea Commentary on Revelation 14:17-18:20	6	Vatican Library, Barb.gr.474, fol. 224-229	Vatican City	Vatican City	INTF
2023	15th	Andreas of Caesarea Commentary on Revelation	59	State Historical Museum, V. 155, S. 66, fol. 405-463	Moscow	Russia	INTF
2024	15th	Revelation	36	State Historical Museum, V. 391, S. 205, fol. 53-88	Moscow	Russia	INTF
2025	15th	Revelation	36	National Library, Grec 19, fol. 91-126	Paris	France	BnF, INTF
2026	15th	Andreas of Caesarea Commentary on Revelation	83	National Library, Supplement Grec 99	Paris	France	BnF, INTF
2027	13th	Revelation†	13	National Library, Grec 491, fol. 281-293	Paris	France	BnF, INTF
2028	1422	Revelation	119	National Library, Grec 239	Paris	France	BnF, INTF
2029	16th	Andreas of Caesarea Commentary on Revelation	294	National Library, Grec 241	Paris	France	BnF, INTF
2030	12th	Revelation^{P}	7	Scientific Library of the State Gorky University, 1, fol. 203-209	Moscow	Russia	INTF
2031	14th	Andreas of Caesarea Commentary on Revelation	111	Vatican Library, Vat.gr.1743	Vatican City	Vatican City	INTF
2032	11th	1 John 4:3-5:3†; Andreas of Caesarea Commentary on Revelation 1:12-2:20, 3:6-6:9, 7:17-9:5, 21:18-22:17†	19	Vatican Library, Vat.gr.1904 II, fol. 264-282	Vatican City	Vatican City	DVL
2032	11th	1 John 4:3-5:3†; Andreas of Caesarea Commentary on Revelation 1:12-2:20, 3:6-6:9, 7:17-9:5, 21:18-22:17†	19	Vatican Library, Vat.gr.1904 II, fol. 264-282	Vatican City	Vatican City	INTF
2033	16th	Andreas of Caesarea Commentary on Revelation	180	Vatican Library, Chig.R.IV.8	Vatican City	Vatican City	INTF
2034	16th	Andreas of Caesarea Commentary on Revelation	97	Library of the National Lincei and Corsinian Academy, Cors. 838 (41.E.37)	Rome	Italy	INTF
2035	16th	Federigo da Venezia, Literalis expositio super Apocalypsim	363	Laurentian Library, Plut.07.09	Florence	Italy	BML, INTF
2036	14th	Andreas of Caesarea Commentary on Revelation	207	Vatican Library, Vat.gr.656	Vatican City	Vatican City	INTF
[2036^{abs}] = 2891							
2037	14th	Andreas of Caesarea Commentary on Revelation	169	Bavarian State Library, Cod.graec. 544	Munich	Germany	BSB, INTF
2038	16th	Andreas of Caesarea Commentary on Revelation	83	Bavarian State Library, Cod.graec. 23, fol. 333-415	Munich	Germany	BSB, INTF
2039	12th	Revelation	16	Owner unknown, (Dresden, Sächs. LB, A 95)	Dresden	Germany	
[2040] = 911							
2041	14th	Revelation	22	British Library, Add MS 39612	London	England	BL
2041	14th	Revelation	22	British Library, Add MS 39612	London	England	INTF
2042	14th	Revelation	27	Victor Emmanuel III National Library, Ms. II. A. 10, fol. 117-143	Naples	Italy	INTF
2043	15th	Andreas of Caesarea Commentary on Revelation	25	National Library of Russia, Gr. 129	Saint Petersburg	Russia	INTF
2044	16th	Andreas of Caesarea Commentary on Revelation	120	Austrian National Library, Theol. gr. 69	Vienna	Austria	INTF
2045	14th	Andreas of Caesarea Commentary on Revelation	83	Austrian National Library, Theol. gr. 163	Vienna	Austria	INTF
2046	16th	Andreas of Caesarea Commentary on Revelation	152	Austrian National Library, Theol. gr. 220	Vienna	Austria	INTF
2047	16th	Andreas of Caesarea Commentary on Revelation	161	National Library, Grec 240	Paris	France	BnF, INTF
2048	11th	Revelation	22	National Library, Coislin 256, fol. 207-228	Paris	France	INTF
[2049]	16th	Revelation copied from a printed edition	23	Hellenic Parliament Library, HPL 45, fol. 232-254	Athens	Greece	CSNTM
[2049]	16th	Revelation copied from a printed edition	23	Hellenic Parliament Library, HPL 45, fol. 232-254	Athens	Greece	INTF
2050	12th	Revelation† 1:1-5:14; 20:1-22:21	7	Royal Site of San Lorenzo de El Escorial, C. III. 6, fol. 235-241	San Lorenzo de El Escorial	Spain	INTF
2051	16th	Andreas of Caesarea Commentary on Revelation	83	National Library, 4750, fol. 303-385	Madrid	Spain	INTF
2052	16th	Andreas of Caesarea Commentary on Revelation† 1:1-4:11; 5:6-7:5	32	Laurentian Library, Plut.07.29, fol. 193-224	Florence	Italy	BML
2053	13th	Oecumenius Commentary on Revelation	138	University Library, 99	Messina	Italy	INTF
2054	15th	Revelation	125	Estense Library, G. 154, a.W.4.21 (III E 1), fol. 122-246	Modena	Italy	INTF
2055	15th	Andreas of Caesarea Commentary on Revelation	63	Estense Library, G. 190, a.V.8.14 (III F 12), fol. 319-381	Modena	Italy	INTF
2056	14th	Revelation	86	Angelica Library, Ang. gr. 57, fol. 1-86	Rome	Italy	IC
2056	14th	Revelation	86	Angelica Library, Ang. gr. 57, fol. 1-86	Rome	Italy	INTF
2057	15th	Revelation	35	Angelica Library, 32, fol. 171-205	Rome	Italy	IC
2057	15th	Revelation	35	Angelica Library, 32, fol. 171-205	Rome	Italy	INTF
2058	14th	Andreas of Caesarea and Oecumenius Commentaries on Revelation	28	Vatican Library, Chig.R.V.33, fol. 44-71	Vatican City	Vatican City	DVL,
2058	14th	Andreas of Caesarea and Oecumenius Commentaries on Revelation	28	Vatican Library, Chig.R.V.33, fol. 44-71	Vatican City	Vatican City	INTF
2059	11th	Andreas of Caesarea Commentary on Revelation	103	Vatican Library, Vat.Gr.370, fol. 149-251	Vatican City	Vatican City	DVL, INTF
2060	1331	Andreas of Caesarea Commentary on Revelation	105	Vatican Library, Vat.Gr.542	Vatican City	Vatican City	INTF
2061	16th	Revelation	11	Vatican Library, Vat.Gr.1190, fol. 174-184	Vatican City	Vatican City	DVL, INTF
2062	13th	Oecumenius Commentary on Revelation	29	Vatican Library, Vat.Gr.1426	Vatican City	Vatican City	INTF
2063	16th	Revelation	114	Vatican Library, Vat.Gr.1976	Vatican City	Vatican City	INTF
2064	16th	Andreas of Caesarea Commentary on Revelation	71	Vatican Library, Vat.gr.2129, p. 17-158 (p. 1-10: l 561)	Vatican City	Vatican City	DVL, INTF
2065	15th	Andreas of Caesarea Commentary on Revelation	144	Vatican Library, Ott.gr.154	Vatican City	Vatican City	DVL
2065	15th	Andreas of Caesarea Commentary on Revelation	144	Vatican Library, Ott.gr.154	Vatican City	Vatican City	INTF
[2066]	16th	Andreas of Caesarea Commentary on Revelation copied from a printed edition	123	Vatican Library, Ott.gr. 283	Vatican City	Vatican City	DVL
[2066]	16th	Andreas of Caesarea Commentary on Revelation copied from a printed edition	123	Vatican Library, Ott.gr. 283	Vatican City	Vatican City	INTF
2067	15th	Andreas of Caesarea Commentary on Revelation	86	Vatican Library, Pal.gr.346	Vatican City	Vatican City	INTF
2068	16th	Revelation	150	Marciana National Library, Gr. I,40 (1377)	Venice	Italy	INTF
2069	15th	Revelation	30	Marciana National Library, Gr. II,54 (981), fol. 1-30	Venice	Italy	INTF
2070	1356	Andreas of Caesarea Commentary on Revelation	58	Skete of Saint Anne, 11, fol. 250-307	Mount Athos	Greece	INTF
2071	1622	Revelation	160	Dionysiou Monastery, 163, fol. 4-163	Mount Athos	Greece	INTF
[2072]	1798	Commentary on Revelation copied from a printed edition.	281	Docheiariou Monastery, 81, p. 13-574	Mount Athos	Greece	INTF
2073	14th	Revelation	157	Iviron Monastery, 34	Mount Athos	Greece	INTF
2074	10th	Andreas of Caesarea Commentary on Revelation	63	Iviron Monastery, 379, fol. 83-145	Mount Athos	Greece	INTF
2075	14th	Revelation	161	Iviron Monastery, 546	Mount Athos	Greece	INTF
2076	16th	Revelation	23	Iviron Monastery, 594, fol. 1-23	Mount Athos	Greece	INTF
2077	17th	Andreas of Caesarea Commentary on Revelation	319	Iviron Monastery, 644	Mount Athos	Greece	INTF
2078	16th	Revelation	22	Konstamonitou Monastery, 29, fol. 375-396	Mount Athos	Greece	INTF
2079	13th	Revelation	45	Konstamonitou Monastery, 107, fol. 115-159	Mount Athos	Greece	INTF
2080	14th	Acts† 1:13-28:31; General Epistles; Pauline Epistles; Revelation† 1:1-22:16	278	Monastery of Saint John the Theologian, 12	Patmos	Greece	INTF
2080	14th	Acts† 1:13-28:31; General Epistles; Pauline Epistles; Revelation† 1:1-22:16	278	Monastery of Saint John the Theologian, 12	Patmos	Greece	CSNTM
2081	11th	Andreas of Caesarea Commentary on Revelation	146	Monastery of Saint John the Theologian, 64	Patmos	Greece	CSNTM
2082	16th	Revelation	21	Saxon State Library, A. 187	Dresden	Germany	SLUB
2082	16th	Revelation	21	Saxon State Library, A. 187	Dresden	Germany	CSNTM
2083	16th	Andreas of Caesarea Commentary on Revelation	113	Leiden University Library, Voss. Gr. Fol. 48, fol. 135-247	Leiden	Netherlands	INTF
2084	15th	Revelation	19	National Library, Taphu 303, fol. 7 v-26 r	Athens	Greece	INTF
2085	1308	Acts, Pauline Epistles, General Epistles	225	Saint Catherine's Monastery, Gr. 277	Sinai	Egypt	LOC, CSNTM
2086	14th	Acts, Pauline Epistles, General Epistles	176	Saint Catherine's Monastery, Gr. 278	Sinai	Egypt	LOC, INTF, CSNTM
2087	15th	Revelation† 3:3-4:8	2	University Library, AN III 12, fol. 97v und 248r	Basel	Switzerland	INTF
[2088]	?	Acts, General Epistles	?	(Manuscript Destroyed)	Zakynthos	Greece	
2089	15th	2 Corinthians^{P} 4:14–7:8, 12:2–13:13	4	National Library, 527, p. 1-4.399-402	Athens	Greece	CSNTM
2090	16th	Excerpts from Pauline Epistles†	14	Ambrosiana Library, N 272 sup.	Milan	Italy	INTF
2091	15th	Andreas of Caesarea Commentary on Revelation† 10:8-21:6	80	National Library, 142, fol. 1-80	Athens	Greece	CSNTM
2091	15th	Andreas of Caesarea Commentary on Revelation† 10:8-21:6	80	National Library, 142, fol. 1-80	Athens	Greece	INTF
2092	18th	Romans - Galatians	?	Esphigmenou Monastery, 94	Mount Athos	Greece	
[2093]	13th	Gospels, Acts, Pauline Epistles, General Epistles	266	(Destroyed?)			
2094	13th	Pauline Epistles^{P}	144	Royal Site of San Lorenzo de El Escorial, Y. II. 20	San Lorenzo de El Escorial	Spain	INTF
2095	13th	Gospels	210	Cambridge University Library, Add. Mss. 3326	Cambridge	United Kingdom	INTF
2096	12th	Matthew †, Mark †, Luke †	158	Hellenic Parliament Library, HPL 44	Athens	Greece	CSNTM
2096	12th	Matthew †, Mark †, Luke †	158	Hellenic Parliament Library, HPL 44	Athens	Greece	INTF
2097	11th	Gospels	289	Hellenic Parliament Library, HPL 4	Athens	Greece	CSNTM
2097	11th	Gospels	289	Hellenic Parliament Library, HPL 4	Athens	Greece	INTF
2098	11th	Luke, John	157	Fitzwilliam Museum McClean Collection, McClean 3	Cambridge	United Kingdom	INTF
2099	13th	Gospels	284	British Library, Add MS 35030	London	United Kingdom	BL
2100	13th	Theophylact Commentary on the Gospels	197	Christ Church, Wake 54	Oxford	United Kingdom	INTF

[top]

== See also ==
- List of New Testament papyri
- List of New Testament uncials
- List of New Testament minuscules (1–1000)
- List of New Testament minuscules (1001–2000)
- List of New Testament minuscules (2001–)
- List of New Testament minuscules ordered by Location/Institution
- List of New Testament lectionaries

== Bibliography ==
- Aland, Kurt; M. Welte; B. Köster; K. Junack (1994). Kurzgefasste Liste der griechischen Handschriften des Neues Testaments. Berlin, New York: Walter de Gruyter. p. 95. ISBN 3-11-011986-2.
- "Liste Handschriften". Münster: Institute for New Testament Textual Research.
