= Lectionary 300 =

Greek manuscript

Lectionary ℓ 300
- New Testament manuscript
- Name: Gospel of Theodosius
- Text: Evangelistarium
- Date: 11th-century
- Script: Greek
- Now at: Saint Catherine's Monastery
- Size: 28 cm by 21.5 cm
- Type: Byzantine text-type
- Hand: written in gold

Lectionary 300, designated by siglum ℓ 300 (in the Gregory-Aland numbering) is a Greek manuscript of the New Testament, written on parchment. It has been palaeographically assigned to the 11th century. The manuscript is written in gold ink and contains Gospel lessons for selected days. It was named as "Gospel of Theodosius".

== Description ==
The codex contains lessons from the Gospel of John, Matthew, and Luke (Evangelistarium) on 204 parchment leaves (28 cm by 21.5 cm). The text is written in large golden letters described by at least one observer as beautiful. It contains rough breathing, smooth breathing, accents, and some images. The text is divided into verses as in modern editions of the Bible.

The text is written in Greek uncial letters in two columns per page, 16 lines per page. The manuscript contains lessons for selected days, opening with the Gospel lessons for the first five days of Easter week and followed by 65 more lessons from other parts of the yearly services.

== History ==
According to tradition it was supposedly written by the Emperor Theodosius († 395). However in 1864, J. Dury Geden called this absurd and suggested that Theodosius III (716) was probably intended. Today, it is now dated on palaeographical grounds as much later still. Scrivener dated the manuscript to the 9th-11th century, Gardthausen and C. R. Gregory dated it to the 10th or 11th century. It is presently assigned by the INTF to the 11th century.

The manuscript was probably seen in 1761 by the Italian traveller, Vitaliano Donati, when he visited the Saint Catherine's Monastery in Sinai. His diary, published in 1879, notes:

"In questo monastero ritrovai una quantità grandissima di codici membranacei... ve ne sono alcuni che mi sembravano anteriori al settimo secolo, ed in ispecie una Bibbia in membrane bellissime, assai grandi, sottili, e quadre, scritta in carattere rotondo e belissimo; conservano poi in chiesa un Evangelistario greco in caractere d'oro rotondo, che dovrebbe pur essere assai antico".

In this monastery I found a great number of parchment codices ... there are some which seemed to be written before the seventh century, and especially a Bible (made) of beautiful, very large, thin and square parchments, written in round and very beautiful letters; moreover there are also in the church a Greek Evangelistarium in gold and round letters, it should be very old.

The "Bible on beautiful vellum" noted above is probably the Codex Sinaiticus and the gold evangelistarium is likely Lectionary 300.

Others who saw it later include Dean Burgon (1862), M. E. Young, J. Dury Geden (1864), and Victor Gardthausen. The manuscript was added to the list of New Testament manuscripts by Caspar René Gregory as number 300^{e}. Frederick Scrivener catalogued the manuscript as 286^{e} on his list.

The manuscript is not cited in the critical editions of the Greek New Testament (UBS3, UBS4).

The codex is currently housed at the Saint Catherine's Monastery (Gr. 204) in Sinai Peninsula.

== See also ==
- List of New Testament lectionaries
- Biblical manuscript
- Textual criticism
- Lectionary 297

== Bibliography ==
- Gregory, Caspar René (1900). Textkritik des Neuen Testaments. Vol. 1. Leipzig: J.C. Hinrichs. p. 413.
- Scrivener, Frederick Henry Ambrose; Edward Miller (1894). A Plain Introduction to the Criticism of the New Testament. Vol. 1 (4th ed.). London: George Bell & Sons. p. 348.
- Victor Gardthausen, Catalogus codicum Graecorum Sinaiticorum (Oxonii e typographeo Clarendoniano, 1886), pp. 40–41.
