= Minuscule 495 =

- New Testament manuscript
- Text: Gospels †
- Date: 12th-century
- Script: Greek
- Found: 1846
- Now at: British Library
- Size: 16.9 cm by 12.2 cm
- Type: Byzantine text-type/Kmix
- Category: none
- Note: full marginalia

Minuscule 495 (in the Gregory-Aland numbering), ε 243 (in the Soden numbering), is a Greek minuscule manuscript of the New Testament, on parchment. Palaeographically it has been assigned to the 12th-century. Scrivener labelled it by number 581. The manuscript is lacunose, marginalia are full. It was adapted for liturgical use.

== Description ==
The codex contains the text of the four Gospels on 181 parchment leaves (size 16.9 cm by 12.2 cm) with small lacuna at the beginning. The text is written in one column per page, 28-29 lines per page. The headings of the Gospels are titled in way εκ του κατα... (Note: In this way are titled the headings of the Gospels in manuscripts: 69, 178, 543, 668.)

The text is divided according to the κεφαλαια (chapters), whose numbers are given at the margin, and their τιτλοι (titles) at the top of the pages. There is also a division according to the smaller Ammonian Sections, with references to the Eusebian Canons.

It contains the Epistula ad Carpianum, tables of the κεφαλαια (tables of contents) before each Gospel, lectionary markings at the margin (for liturgical use), liturgical books with hagiographies (Synaxarion, and Menologion). It has marginal notes. It has not the Eusebian Canon tables but there is a space for it.

== Text ==
The Greek text of the codex is a representative of the Byzantine text-type. Hermann von Soden did not include it to the subfamilies of the Byzantine text, he classified it is a member of the I' group with 28 other manuscripts. Wisse classified it as Kmix (a mixture of the Byzantine families). Aland did not place it in any Category.

It has some unique readings and many corrections.

== History ==
The manuscript is dated by the INTF to the 12th-century.

In 1846 the manuscript was bought together with the codex 496 from captain C. K. MacDonald, who visited Sinai (and saw Codex Sinaiticus). The manuscript was added to the list of New Testament manuscripts by Scrivener (581) and C. R. Gregory (495). It was examined by Scrivener and Bloomfield.

It is currently housed at the British Library (Add MS 16183) in London.

== See also ==
- List of New Testament minuscules
- Biblical manuscript
- Textual criticism
