= Uncial 0281 =

- New Testament manuscript
- Text: Gospel of Matthew 6-27
- Date: 7th/8th century
- Script: Greek
- Found: 1975
- Now at: Saint Catherine's Monastery
- Size: 20 cm by 17 cm
- Type: Alexandrian text-type
- Category: ?

Uncial 0281 (in the Gregory-Aland numbering), is a Greek uncial manuscript of the New Testament. Palaeographically it has been assigned to the 7th or 8th century.

== Description ==
The codex contains a small parts of the Gospel of Matthew 6-27, on 47 parchment leaves (20 cm by 17 cm). The text is written in one column per page, 20 lines per page, in uncial letters. It is a palimpsest, the upper text contains part of the Old Testament.

Currently it is dated by the INTF to the 7th or 8th century.

== Text ==
The Greek text of the codex is a representative of the late Alexandrian text-type.

It agrees 18 times with Codex Sinaiticus and 12 times with Codex Vaticanus.

== Location ==
It is one of the manuscripts discovered in Saint Catherine's Monastery, Sinai in May 1975, during restoration work. Currently the codex is housed at the monastery (N.E. ΜΓ 29).

== See also ==
- List of New Testament uncials
- Biblical manuscript
- Textual criticism
