= Minuscule 496 =

- New Testament manuscript
- Text: New Testament (except Rev.)
- Date: 13th-century
- Script: Greek
- Found: 1846
- Now at: British Library
- Size: 19.7 cm by 13.2 cm
- Type: Byzantine text-type
- Category: V
- Note: marginalia

Minuscule 496 (in the Gregory-Aland numbering), δ 360 (in the Soden numbering), is a Greek minuscule manuscript of the New Testament, on parchment. Palaeographically it has been assigned to the 13th-century. Scrivener labelled it by number 582. The manuscript has complex contents with full marginalia and liturgical books.

== Description ==
The codex contains the whole New Testament except Apocalypse on 300 parchment leaves (size 19.7 cm by 13.2 cm). It has not any lacunae. The text is written in one column per page, 33-40 lines per page.

The text is divided according to the κεφαλαια (chapters), whose numbers are given at the margin, and their τιτλοι (titles) at the top of the pages. The text of the Gospels has also another division according to the smaller Ammonian Sections, with references to the Eusebian Canons (written below Ammonian Section numbers).

It contains the Epistula ad Carpianum, prolegomena, tables of the κεφαλαια (tables of contents) before each book, lectionary markings at the margin (for liturgical use), incipits, liturgical books with hagiographies (Synaxarion and Menologion), subscriptions at the end of each book, with numbers of στιχοι.

The order of books is a usual: Gospels, Acts, Catholic epistles, and Pauline epistles. The pericope John 7:53-8:11 is omitted.

== Text ==
The Greek text of the codex is a representative of the Byzantine text-type. According to Hermann von Soden it is related to the Byzantine commentated text. Aland placed it in Category V. It contains many important various readings, e.g. it countenances codices Sinaiticus, Vaticanus, and Regius in Luke 11:2.4. According to the Claremont Profile Method it represents the textual group 1167 in Luke 1, Luke 10, and Luke 20.

The text was corrected.

== History ==
The manuscript was dated to the 13th or 14th-century. Currently it is dated by the INTF to the 13th-century.

In 1846 the manuscript was bought together with the codex 495 from captain C. K. MacDonald, who visited Sinai (and saw Codex Sinaiticus). The manuscript was added to the list of New Testament manuscripts by Scrivener (582) and C. R. Gregory (496). It was examined by Scrivener and Bloomfield.

It is currently housed at the British Library (Add MS 16184) in London.

== See also ==
- List of New Testament minuscules
- Biblical manuscript
- Textual criticism
