= Vitaliano Donati =

Italian scientist (1717–1762)

Doctor of Medicine Vitaliano Donati FRS
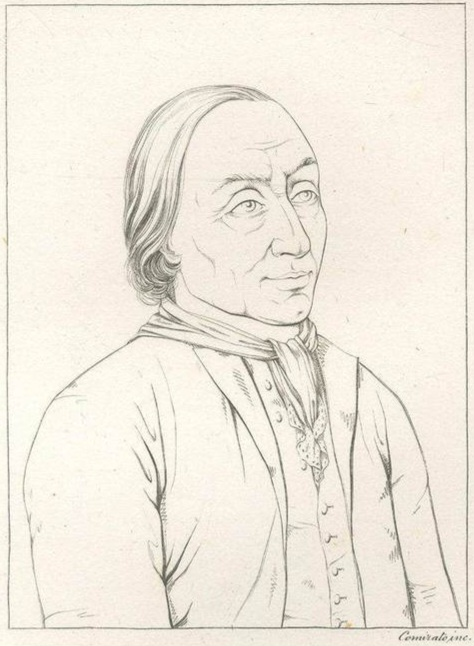
- Vitaliano Donati
- Born: 8 September 1717; Padua, Republic of Venice
- Died: 26 February 1762 (aged 44); Indian Ocean
- Occupations: Physician; Naturalist; Archaeologist

Academic background
- Education: University of Padua
- Doctoral advisor: Giovanni Battista Morgagni

Academic work
- Era: Age of Enlightenment
- Institutions: University of Padua; University of Turin; Orto Botanico dell'Università di Torino

Vitaliano Donati FRS (8 September 1717 – 26 February 1762) was an Italian medical doctor, archeologist and botanist. A pioneering Egyptologist, Donati led an expedition to Egypt in 1759 that laid the foundations for the Egyptian Museum of Turin.

== Biography ==
=== Early life and education ===
Vitaliano Donati was born in Padua in the Republic of Venice on 8 September 1717. He studied medicine and philosophy at the University of Padua, earning his doctorate on 10 June 1739. During his time in Padua, he became acquainted with the anatomist Giovanni Battista Morgagni, the physicist Giovanni Poleni, and the naturalists Antonio Vallisneri and Giulio Pontedera. While still a student, he travelled throughout northern Italy, exploring its flora and fauna. Accompanied by the historian and economist Gian Rinaldo Carli, he studied the flora and ancient monuments of the Istrian coast, particularly in Pula.

In 1741, he became an assistant professor of experimental physics at the University of Padua. Two years later, in 1743, he accompanied Poleni to Rome, where he was asked to provide his expert opinion on how to prevent the dome of St Peter's Basilica from deteriorating. Pope Benedict XIV entrusted Donati with the project of establishing a chair and a museum of natural history at the Sapienza University of Rome. The Pope commissioned Donati to travel to the Kingdom of Naples and Sicily to collect specimens for the museum. However, the plague that had been raging in Messina since May 1743 forced him to abandon this plan.

=== Scientific research ===
Donati left Sicily for Dalmatia, where he systematically studied the local flora and fauna. He visited the main Adriatic islands and th coastal cities such of Split, Zadar and Šibenik, and explored the interior of the 'Illyrian' territory, particularly Lika and Bosnia. Donati was the first naturalist to collect plants on the peaks of Velebit and explore the forests of Grmeč. In December 1745, he sent a scientific report from Knin in northern Dalmatia to his patron Antonio Leprotti in Rome. The report was published in Venice in 1750 under the title Della storia naturale marina dell'Adriatico.

The book contains general considerations on marine biology and original observations on the hydrography and geology of the eastern Adriatic coast. It also features schematic representations of fishing equipment and descriptions of fossils. Most notably, it provides a detailed and well-illustrated presentation of the many species living in the Adriatic Sea. Despite some criticism from the French scientific community, the book's success was immediate and enduring. Albrecht von Haller praised it, emphasising its originality. The section on corals was translated into English and published in Philosophical Transactions, under the title New Discoveries Relating to the History of Coral. A German translation of the entire book was printed in Halle the following year (1752), and in 1756, Abraham Trembley summarised and analysed Donati's work in detail in the Philosophical Transactions. In 1758, Donati's treatise was translated into French and published in The Hague under the title Essai sur l'histoire naturelle de la mer Adriatique.

=== Turin ===
In 1750, Charles Emmanuel III, king of Sardinia, offered Donati a chair of Botany and Natural history at the University of Turin. During his career as a professor, he also occupied the chair of Mineralogy and Geology. He was also the director of the Orto Botanico dell'Università di Torino from 1750 until his death. In 1757, Donati was elected a foreign member of the Royal Swedish Academy of Sciences and a Fellow of the Royal Society.

=== The Egyptian mission ===
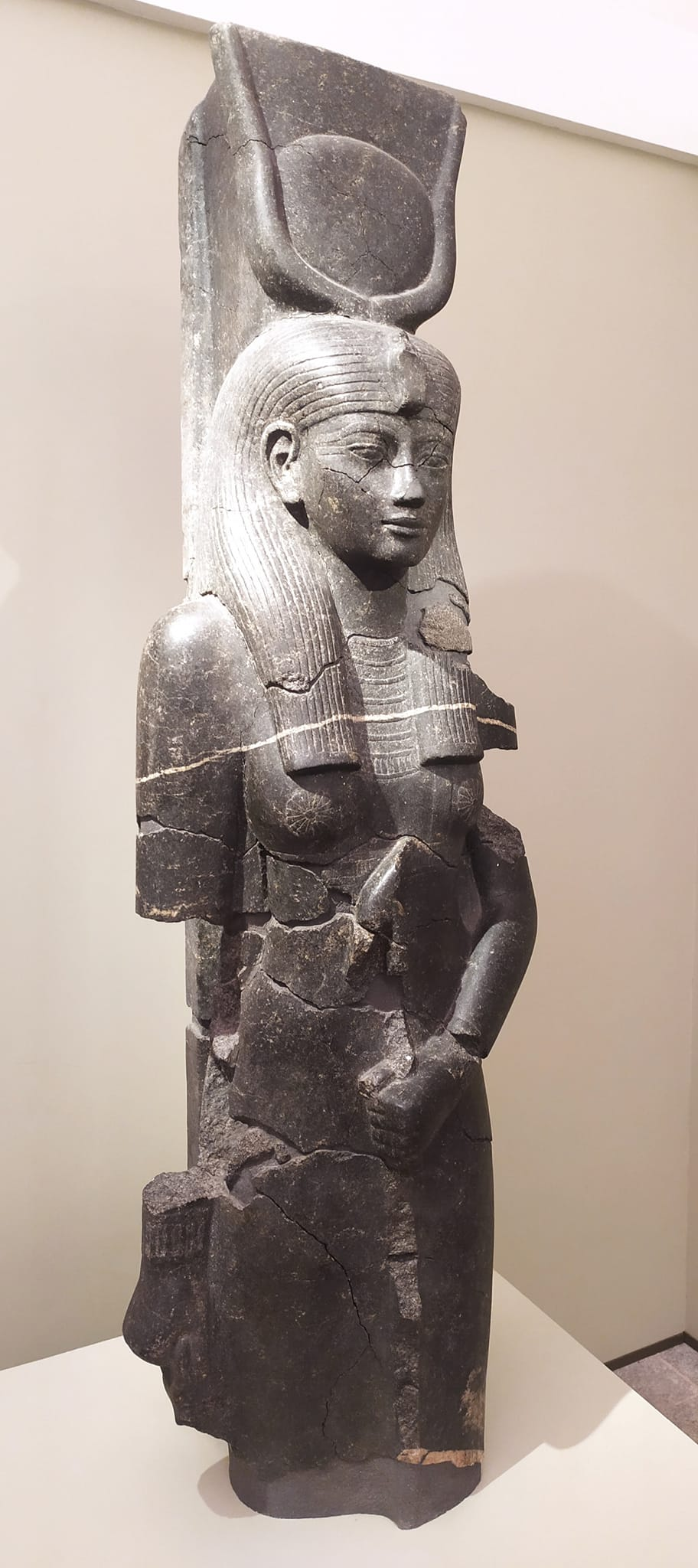
Statue of Isis discovered by Donati and now held by the Egyptian Museum in Turin

In 1759, Charles Emmanuel III commissioned Donati to travel to Egypt and the Middle East to collect natural history specimens and ancient Egyptian artefacts. Donati arrived in Alexandria in July of that year, accompanied by the painter Christian Wehrlin and the physician and naturalist Giovanni Battista Ronco. With substantial financial resources at his disposal, Donati began systematically acquiring artwork, as well as mineralogical, botanical, and zoological specimens. However, intense disputes fractured the group. After an argument with Ronco, Donati decided to continue his mission alone. He recruited Stefano Aspahan, a highly capable local interpreter and guide, to assist him. Aspahan remained a loyal aide until Donati's death and also contributed to the compilation and subsequent preservation of his travel journal.

In 1760, Donati travelled up the Nile. He conducted excavations at Karnak, unearthing numerous precious artefacts, including two large statues of Ramesses II and the goddess Sekhmet. He also visited marble quarries, studied the valley's petrography and the river's hydrography, reached the cataract at Aswan and mapped the area, and navigated beyond it into Nubia. After returning to Cairo at Christmas, he soon departed again for Mount Sinai, visiting the Coptic monasteries and taking notes on ancient inscriptions, as well as the contents of their libraries and collections of natural specimens.

In 1761, Donati travelled to Palestine and Syria. In September, he arrived in Damascus, from where he continued to Basra and then on to Muscat by sea. On 13 February 1762, he boarded a Turkish ship bound for the Malabar Coast from the Persian Gulf. However, he fell ill during the voyage and died on 26 February 1762. He was buried in Mangaluru.

Only some of the drawings, artefacts, historical documents and natural history specimens collected by Donati during his journey to the East survived and were brought back to Italy. These materials form the core of the Egyptian Museum and the Turin Museum of Natural History. The primary surviving record of Donati's expedition is his travel journal, which he kept from his departure from Venice in June 1759 until his arrival in Muscat in January 1762. The complete text of this journal was never published. It contains information on the archaeology, physical geography and natural history of Egypt, Palestine and Syria, as well as the cultural anthropology, trade practices and medicine of the peoples inhabiting these regions.

== Honours ==
Two plant genera were named in Donati's honour: Vitaliana, named by Sesler, and Donatia, named by Forster.

== Works ==
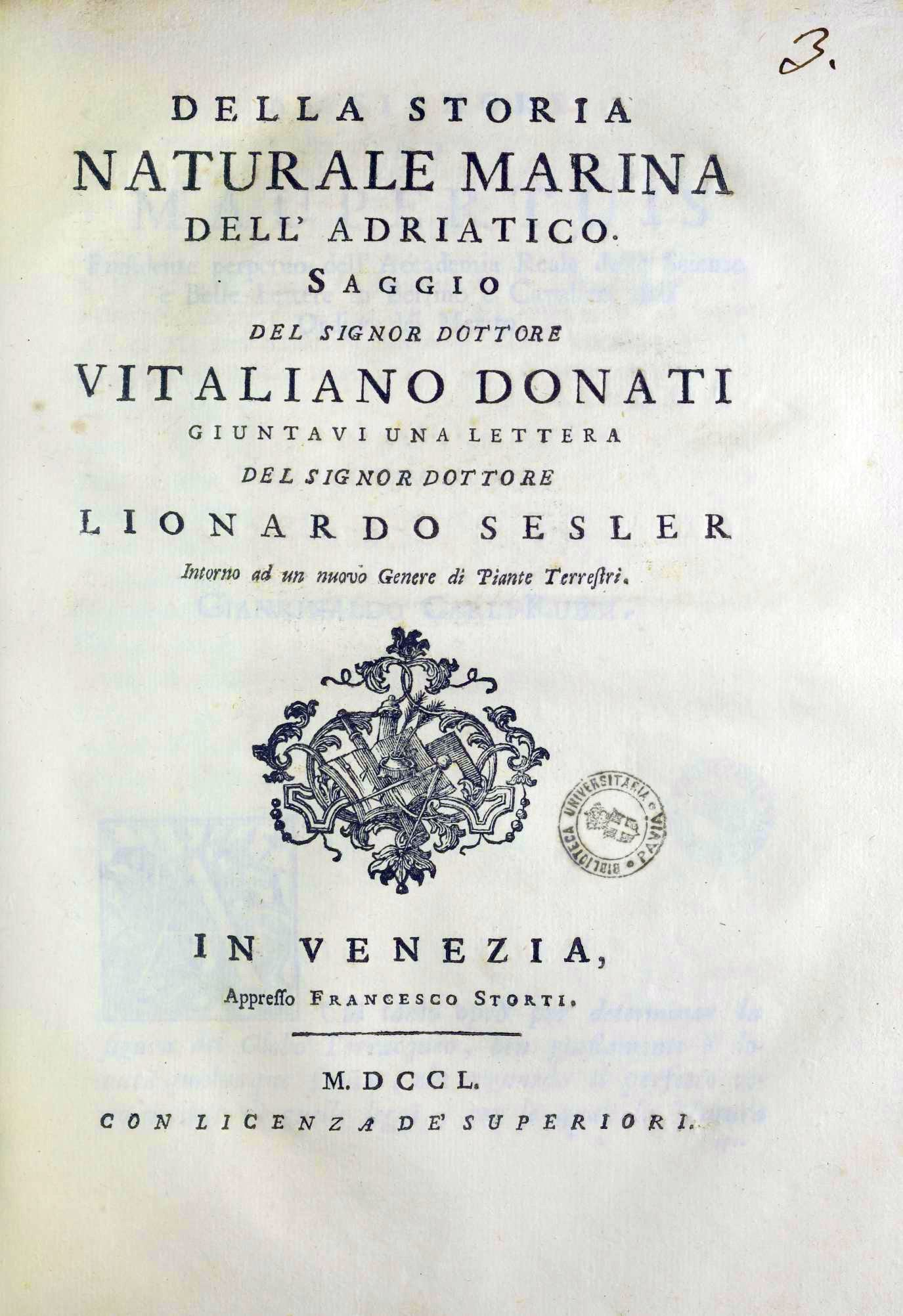
Della storia naturale marina dell'Adriatico, 1750

- Della Storia Naturale Marina dell'Adriatico. Venice: Francesco Storti. 1750.
  - De Historia Naturali Adriatici Maris Tentamen. Leipzig: Gleditsch. 1752.
  - Vitaliano Donati Auszug seiner Natur-Geschichte des Adriatischen Meers den Boden des Meers zu untersuchen, nebst Instrumenten in solcher Tiefe zu fischen (in German). Halle: Francken. 1753.
  - Essai sur l'Histoire Naturelle de la Mer Adriatique (in French). The Hague: Pierre de Hondt. 1758.
- Giuse Scalva, ed. (2002). Viaggio mineralogico nelle Alpi occidentali. Valle di Susa, Maurienne, Tarentaise, Valle d'Aosta e Faucigny, nell'estate 1751. Bologna: Editrice Compositori. ISBN 978-8877942944.

== See also ==
- Lectionary 300

== Bibliography ==
- Constantin von Wurzbach: "Donati, Vitaliano." In: Biographisches Lexikon des Kaiserthums Oesterreich (Biographical Lexicon of the Empire of Austria). Part 3 Verlag der typogr.-literar.-artist. Anstalt (L. C. Zamarski, C. Dittmarsch & Comp.), Vienna 1858, p. 353 (digitalised).
- Grmek, Mirko D. (1992). "DONATI, Vitaliano". Dizionario Biografico degli Italiani (in Italian). Vol. 41: Donaggio–Dugnani. Rome: Istituto dell'Enciclopedia Italiana. ISBN 978-88-12-00032-6.
