= John Dury Geden =

English Wesleyan minister and Hebraist

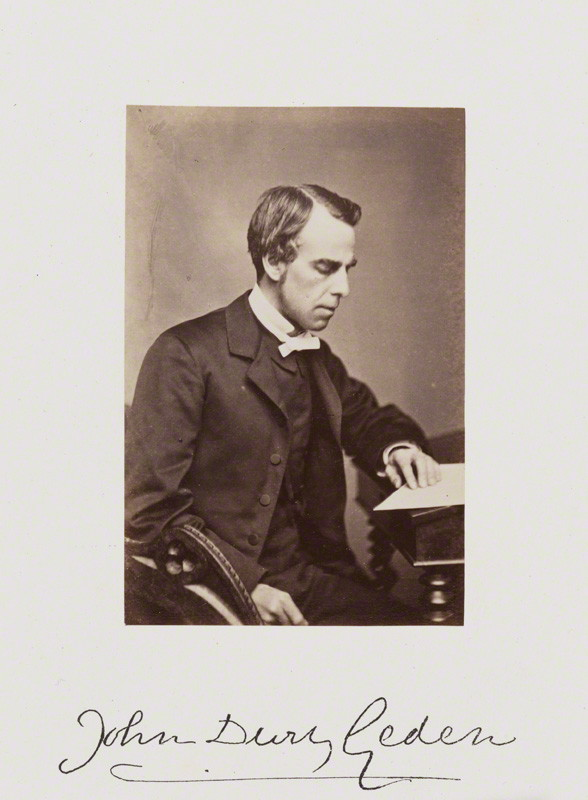
John Dury Geden, 1874 photograph

John Dury Geden (1822–1886) was an English Wesleyan minister and Hebraist.

== Life ==
The son of the Rev. John Geden, a Wesleyan minister, he was born at Hastings on 4 May 1822. In 1830 he was sent to Kingswood School. In 1836 he left school and concentrated on study and teaching.

In 1844 Geden became a candidate for the Wesleyan ministry, and was sent to Richmond Theological College in Surrey. After the standard three years' course, he was appointed assistant tutor in the College. By 1851, when the Methodist conference met in Newcastle upon Tyne, Geden was stationed there, a colleague of William Morley Punshon. After a year in Newcastle and Durham, he was moved to Manchester, where he spent three years in the Oxford Road circuit.

On the death of Jonathan Crowther in January 1856, Geden filled the post of tutor at Didsbury College in Lancashire. Soon after his appointment to Didsbury he became joint editor of the London Quarterly Review, founded in 1853, and contributed to its pages. He was also an occasional preacher in the surrounding district.

In the autumn of 1863 Geden made a journey in the Middle East, through parts of Egypt, the Sinai Peninsula, and Palestine. Dysentery at Jerusalem permanently damaged his health. In 1868 he was elected to the Methodist Legal Hundred.

In 1870 Geden was invited to become a member of the Old Testament Revision Company, and for many years travelled to London to participate. In 1883 failing health compelled him to retire. In January 1885 he received the honorary degree of D.D. from the University of St Andrews. After a long illness, he died on 9 March 1886.

== Works ==
Geden's preferred field of study was oriental literature and philology. In 1874, at the Camborne Methodist conference, he delivered the fifth Fernley lecture, on The Doctrine of a Future Life as contained in the Old Testament Scriptures, opposing the view that the teaching is not to be found in the Old Testament. It was published by the Wesleyan Conference office. In 1878 he published in the same way Didsbury Sermons, orthodox in content.

== Family ==
Geden was twice married: first, to Elizabeth, daughter of Solomon Mease of North Shields; and secondly, to Eliza Jane, daughter of the Robert Hawson of Scarborough, whom he also survived. With his first wife he had two sons and a daughter. The elder son became an architect; the younger son Alfred Shenington Geden (1857–1936) became a missionary to India, and ran Royapettah College, now in Chennai.

== Notes ==
Attribution

This article incorporates text from a publication now in the public domain: Stephen, Leslie, ed. (1890). "Geden, John Dury". Dictionary of National Biography. Vol. 21. London: Smith, Elder & Co.
