= Uncial 085 =

- New Testament manuscript
- Text: Gospel of Matthew 20:3-32; 22:3-16
- Date: 6th century
- Script: Greek
- Now at: Russian National Library
- Size: 24 x 21 cm
- Type: Alexandrian text-type
- Category: II

Uncial 085 (in the Gregory-Aland numbering), ε 23 (Soden), is a Greek uncial manuscript of the New Testament, dated palaeographically to the 6th century.

== Description ==
The codex contains two small parts of the Gospel of Matthew 20:3-32; 22:3-16 on 3 parchment leaves (24 cm by 21 cm). Written in two columns per page, 27 lines per page (size of text 17 by 13.5 cm).

The letters are similar to Coptic. The pages are numbered in the same way as Coptic manuscripts.

== Text ==
The Greek text of this codex is a representative of the Alexandrian text-type with some alien readings. According to some authorities the text has mixed character. Kurt Aland placed it in Category II.

Matthew 20:23

phrase και το βαπτισμα ο εγω βαπτιζομαι βαπτισθησεσθε (and be baptized with the baptism that I am baptized with) omitted, as in codices Sinaiticus, B, D, L, Z, Θ, f^{1}, f^{13}, it, syr^{s, c}, cop^{sa}.

== History ==
It is dated by the Institute for New Testament Textual Research to the 6th century. The manuscript was written in a Coptic monastery.

The codex used to be in Cairo. It is now located at the Russian National Library (Gr. 714) in Saint Petersburg.

== See also ==
- List of New Testament uncials
- Textual criticism
