= Minuscule 2053 =

- New Testament manuscript
- Text: Book of Revelation
- Date: 13th century
- Script: Greek
- Now at: Messina
- Size: 26.8 x 21 cm
- Type: Alexandrian text-type
- Category: I
- Note: close to A, C, and 2062

Minuscule 2053 (in the Gregory-Aland numbering), O^{α31} (von Soden), is a Greek minuscule manuscript of the New Testament, on 138 parchment leaves (26.8 by 21 cm). Paleographically it has been assigned to the 13th century.

== Description ==
The codex contains only the text of the Book of Revelation with the commentary on that Bοοk by Oecumenius. The text is written in two columns per page, in 24 lines per page.

== Text ==
The Greek text of the codex is a representative of the Alexandrian text-type. Textual value is higher than Codex Sinaiticus (in Revelation) and is comparable with manuscripts Codex Alexandrinus, Codex Ephraemi, Minuscule 2062, and Minuscule 2344. It is one of the best witnesses for the Book of Revelation, sometimes even superior to the Papyrus 47. Aland placed it in Category I. It was not examined by the Claremont Profile Method.

== History ==
The manuscript was written in the 13th century in Messina.

The codex currently is housed at the Biblioteca Universitarià (99), in Messina.

== See also ==
- List of New Testament minuscules
- Textual criticism
