= Uncial 0170 =

- New Testament manuscript
- Name: P. Oxy. 1169
- Text: Matthew 6:5-6,8-10,13-15,17
- Date: 5th /6th century
- Script: Greek
- Now at: Princeton Theological Seminary
- Size: 25 x 20 cm
- Type: mixed
- Category: III
- Hand: upright uncial

Uncial 0170 (in the Gregory-Aland numbering), ε 026 (Soden), is a Greek uncial manuscript of the New Testament, dated paleographically to the 5th century (or 6th).

== Description ==
The codex contains a small parts of the Gospel of Matthew 6:5-6,8-10,13-15,17, on one parchment leaf (25 cm by 20 cm). The text is written in two columns per page, 27 lines per page, in uncial letters. The letters are upright and carefully finished.

The Greek text of this codex is mixed. Aland placed it in Category III.

In the Lord's Prayer it does not contain doxology: οτι σου εστιν η βασιλεια και η δυναμις και η δοξα εις τους αιωνας (Matthew 6:13) as in codices א B D Z f^{1}.

Currently it is dated by the INTF to the 5th or 6th century.

The text was edited by Grenfell and Hunt.

The codex currently is housed at the Princeton Theological Seminary (Speer Library, Pap. 11) in Princeton, New Jersey.

== See also ==
- List of New Testament uncials
- Textual criticism
- Lectionary 303
