= Minuscule 336 =

- New Testament manuscript
- Name: Uffenbach 1
- Text: New Testament (except Gospels)
- Date: 15th century
- Script: Greek
- Now at: Hamburg University
- Size: 20 cm by 15.5 cm
- Hand: carelessly written

Minuscule 336 (in the Gregory-Aland numbering), α 500 (Soden), is a Greek minuscule manuscript of the New Testament, on paper. Palaeographically it has been assigned to the 15th century. Formerly it was labelled by 45^{a}, 52^{p}, and 16^{r}.

== Description ==
The codex contains the text of the New Testament (except Gospels) on 268 paper leaves (20 cm by 15.5 cm). The text is written in one column per page, in 22-25 lines per page. After Ephesians 3:7 written by other hand. It contains Prolegomena.

The order of books: Catholic epistles, Book of Revelation, Pauline epistles, and Acts of the Apostles. It is carelessly written.

Kurt Aland did not place the Greek text of the codex in any Category.

== History ==
The manuscript once belonged to Giovanni Ciampini in Rome, then to Zacharias Conrad von Uffenbach, consul in Frankfurt am Main. The manuscript was examined by Wettstein (in 1717), Bengel, Uffenbach. C. R. Gregory saw it in 1878.

Formerly it was labelled by 45^{a}, 52^{p}, and 16^{r}. In 1908 Gregory gave the number 336 to it.

The manuscript is currently housed at the Hamburg University Library (Cod. theol. 1252a) in Hamburg.

== See also ==
- List of New Testament minuscules
- Biblical manuscript
- Textual criticism
