= Minuscule 2062 =

- New Testament manuscript
- Text: Book of Revelation
- Date: 13th century
- Script: Greek
- Now at: Vatican Library
- Size: 34.4 x 25.5 cm
- Type: Alexandrian text-type
- Category: I
- Note: close to 2053

Minuscule 2062 (in the Gregory-Aland numbering), O^{α42} (von Soden), is a Greek minuscule manuscript of the New Testament, on 29 paper leaves (34.4 by 25.5 cm). Palaeographically it has been assigned to the 13th century.

== Description ==
The codex contains the text of the Book of Revelation with a commentary of Oecumenius on that book (together 159 leaves). Book of Revelation is on the end of this codex (pages 131–159).

The text is written in one column per page, in 46 lines per page.

The Greek text of the codex is a representative of the Alexandrian text-type, though codex is not old its text has high value, comparable with Minuscule 2053. Aland placed it in Category I. It was not examined by the Claremont Profile Method.

The codex currently is housed at the Vatican Library (Vat. Gr. 1426), in Rome.

== See also ==
- List of New Testament minuscules
- Biblical manuscript
- Textual criticism
