= Through a Glass Darkly =

Through a Glass Darkly may refer to:

- "Through a glass, darkly" (phrase), a Biblical phrase from 1 Corinthians 13:12

== Film ==
- Through a Glass Darkly (film) (Såsom i en spegel), a 1961 film by Ingmar Bergman

== Literature ==
=== Fiction ===
- Through a Glass, Darkly, a 1950 novel by Helen McCloy
- Through a Glass Darkly, a 1955 novel by Kathleen Norris
- Through a Glass Darkly, a 1965 play by Joe de Graft
- Through a Glass Darkly (Koen novel), 1986, by Karleen Koen
- Through a Glass, Darkly (Gaarder novel), 1993, by Jostein Gaarder
- Through a Glass Darkly, a 1999 novel by Gilbert Morris
- Through a Glass, Darkly, a 2006 novel by Donna Leon

=== Non-fiction ===
- "Through a Glass Darkly: Trying to Understand the Scriptures", a 1986 article by Royal Skousen
- Through a Glass Darkly, a lecture by George Steiner delivered as the 1987 Huizinga Lecture
- Through a Glass Darkly: The Life of Patrick Hamilton, a 1990 biography by Nigel H. Jones
- Through a Glass Darkly: American Views of the Chinese Revolution, a 2006 book by William H. Hinton

=== Poetry ===
- Through a Glass, Darkly, a poem by Arthur Hugh Clough, published posthumously in 1869
- "Through a Glass, Darkly" (poem), a 1922 poem by George S. Patton
- Through a Glass Darkly, a 1932 poetry collection by Sonia Raiziss
- Through a Glass Darkly, a 2008 poetry collection by Don Maclennan

== Music ==
- Through a Glass Darkly (album), a 1978 album by Peter Howell
- Through a Glass, Darkly (musical), a 2008 oratorio by Michael Shaieb
- Through a Glass Darkly, a 1999 album by David Olney
- Through a Glass Darkly, a 2011 song cycle by Thomas Sleeper
- "Through a Glass, Darkly", a 2005 song by Hammock from Kenotic
- "Through a Glass, Darkly", a 2025 song by Warbringer from Wrath and Ruin
- "Through a Glass Darkly", a 2010 program by the Blue Devils Drum and Bugle Corps

== Television episodes ==
- "Through a Glass Darkly" (Andromeda), 2005
- "Through a Glass Darkly" (Dark Oracle), 2006
- "Through a Glass Darkly" (Flashpoint), 2011
- "Through a Glass Darkly", Haunted, 1968
- "Through a Glass, Darkly" (Highlander), 1996
- "Through a Glass, Darkly" (Lois & Clark: The New Adventures of Superman), 1996
- "Through a Glass, Darkly" (Masters of Sex), 2015
- "Through a Glass Darkly" (Millennium), 1998
- "Through a Glass Darkly" (The Musketeers), 2015
- "Through a Glass, Darkly" (Outlander), 2016
- "Through a Glass, Darkly" (Pretty Little Liars), 2015
- "Through a Glass, Darkly" (Snowfall), 2021

== See also ==
- Allegory of the Cave, a parable by Plato in The Republic, c. 375 BC
- In a Glass Darkly, an 1872 collection of short stories by Sheridan Le Fanu
- "In a Glass, Darkly", a story by Agatha Christie included in her 1939 collection The Regatta Mystery
- Through a Glass, Clearly, a 1967 collection of short stories by Isaac Asimov
- Through the Past, Darkly (Big Hits Vol. 2), a 1969 compilation album by The Rolling Stones
- "Through a Lass Darkly", a short story in the 1975 collection Warm Worlds and Otherwise, by James Tiptree Jr. (Alice Sheldon)
- A Scanner Darkly, a 1977 novel by Philip K. Dick
  - A Scanner Darkly (film), a 2006 adaptation of Dick's novel
- The Passion of Darkly Noon, a 1995 horror film directed by Philip Ridley whose eponymous character takes his name from the phrase
- And Now We See but Through a Glass Darkly, a 2003 dark chamber symphony by Justin Lassen
- "In a Mirror, Darkly", a 2005 episode of Star Trek Enterprise
- "Eu un Miroir, Obscurement", a song by ambient drone band Natural Snow Buildings, from The Dance of the Moon and the Sun (2006)
- Through a Glass Productions, an American film and video production company
- Through the Glass Darkly (disambiguation)
- Through a Lens Darkly (disambiguation)
