= First Epistle to the Corinthians =

Book of the New Testament

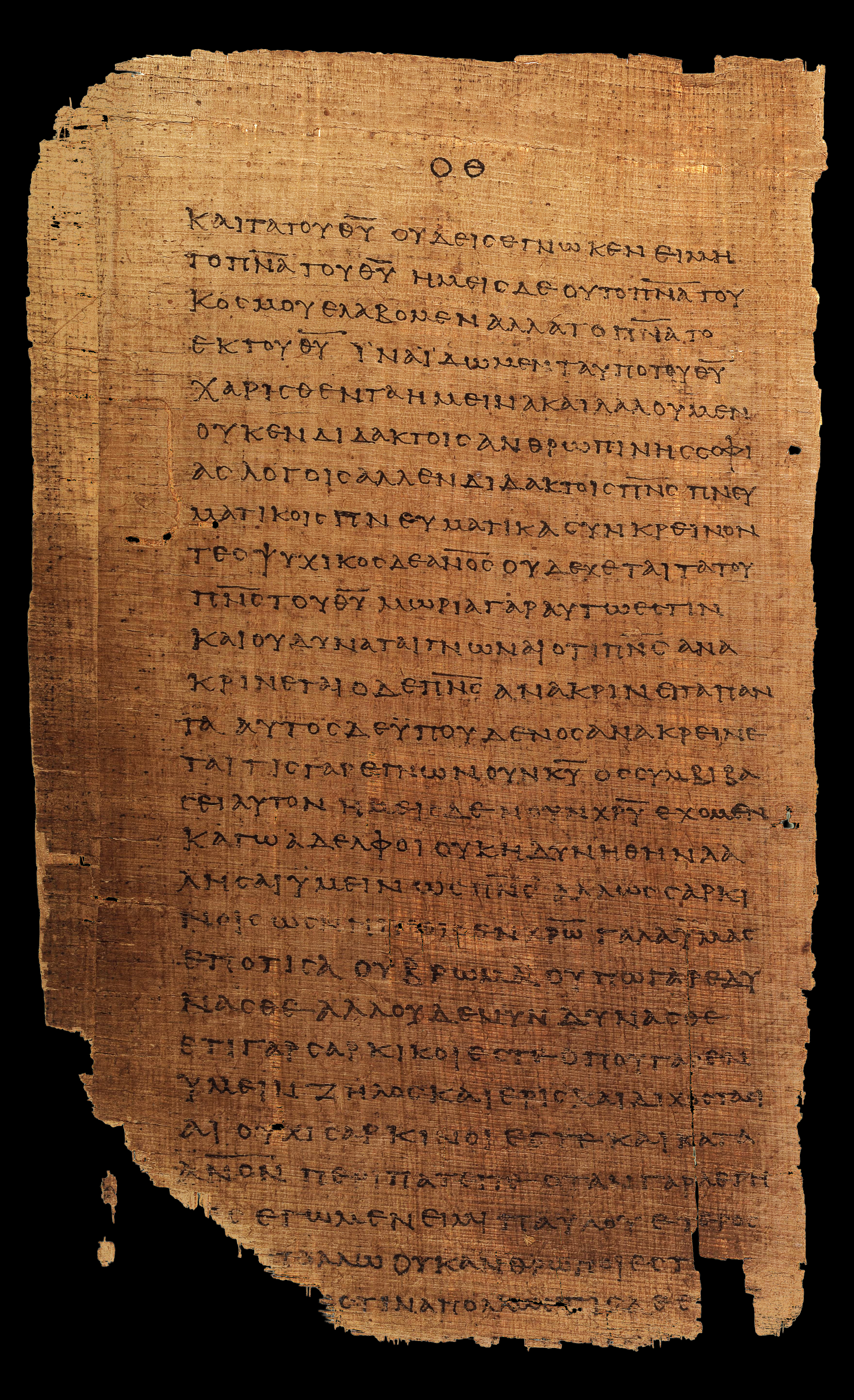
1 Corinthians 2:11–3:5 on Papyrus 46 (fol. 79 verso; c. AD 200)

The First Epistle to the Corinthians (Note: The book is sometimes called the First Letter of Paul to the Corinthians, or simply 1 Corinthians. It is most commonly abbreviated as "1 Cor.") (Ancient Greek: Αʹ Ἐπιστολὴ πρὸς Κορινθίους, A Epistolē pros Korinthious) is among the Pauline epistles in the New Testament. It was written to address various issues that had arisen in the Christian congregation at Corinth, such as divisions in the church; sexual immorality; directions on marriage, food sacrificed to idols, worship, and spiritual gifts; and the resurrection of Jesus.

Pauline authorship of this letter is undisputed, although certain passages are regarded as later interpolations to the text. Despite the traditional title, most scholars do not believe that it is the first of the letters that Paul wrote for the Corinthians, as at 1 Corinthians 5:9 he refers back to an earlier letter. Sosthenes is mentioned in the incipit (1 Corinthians 1:1). Many scholars believe he was a co-sender, although some do not exclude that he could have been an amanuensis.

== Composition ==
=== Authorship ===
According to the consensus among scholars, Paul is the author of this epistle. Paul names Sosthenes as co-sender in the opening greeting (1 Corinthians 1:1), although the letter is written throughout in the first-person singular and his precise role is uncertain. (Note: Commentators differ regarding what the co-sender formula means. Joseph Fitzmyer holds that Paul names Sosthenes "as the co-sender of this letter, not as the coauthor", and that he is mentioned because he was known to the Corinthians; Jerome Murphy-O'Connor argues instead that the plural verbs of 1:18–31 and 2:6–16, each followed by an emphatic kagō ("I myself"), indicate a larger contribution. Some have suggested that Sosthenes served as Paul's amanuensis, since the closing greeting is written in Paul's own hand (1 Corinthians 16:21); Gordon Fee says this is conjecture, and Raymond Collins objects that scribes in surviving Hellenistic correspondence do not insert their names into the epistolary greeting.). Paul does state that he himself wrote the greetings near the end of the letter.

Some scholars point to the potentially embarrassing references to practices of "sexual immorality" among the Corinthian saints as strengthening the case for the authenticity of the letter to the circumstances of its recipients.

=== Date and Place ===
Some scholars, considering the Book of Acts and the references to Ephesus in the Corinthian correspondence, suggest that the letter was written during the time that Paul was staying in Ephesus, usually in the range of 53–57 CE.

It may have been written during Paul's first, brief stay in Ephesus, at the end of his second journey around early 54 CE. However, it is more likely that it was written during his extended stay in Ephesus, where he states that he will send Timothy to them. C. K. Barrett connects the journeys of 1 Corinthians 16:5 and 1 Corinthians 16:10 with Paul's sending of Timothy and Erastus into Macedonia during that journey (Acts 19:22), which he takes as a means of dating the letter.

=== Attestations ===
Although the original Pauline manuscript, or autograph, has not survived, the text is preserved in several manuscripts (with textual variants), the earliest of which being Papyrus 46 (175–225 CE). It is copied in such codices as the Codex Vaticanus (325–350 CE), Codex Sinaiticus (330–360 CE), and Codex Alexandrinus (400–440 CE). It may have been included in the Apostolikon, the earliest attested canon of the New Testament which was sorted by Marcion of Sinope.

=== Other correspondences ===
Although there are only two canonical epistles from Paul to Corinth, he himself acknowledges two other letters that he wrote to them: the Severe Letter between the two canonical epistles to the Corinthians, and the Warning Letter that precedes the first.

Paul indicates that at least some of his responses are to certain concerns made known to him by writings from the Corinthian saints, though he also mentions issues brought to his attention by "Chloe's people."

The Third Epistle to the Corinthians was probably pseudepigraphic and not written by Paul despite the claims made in the text.

== Text ==
=== Interpolations ===
==== Later insertion in 6:20 ====
The majority of early manuscripts end chapter 6 with the words δοξάσατε δὴ τὸν Θεὸν ἐν τῷ σώματι ὑμῶν, doxasate de ton theon en tō sōmati humōn, 'therefore glorify God in your body'. The Textus Receptus adds καὶ ἐν τῷ πνεύματι ὑμῶν, ἅτινά ἐστι τοῦ Θεοῦ, kai en to pneumati humōn, hatina esti tou theou, which the New King James Version translates as "and in your spirit, which are (i.e. body and spirit) God's". J. J. Lias, in the Cambridge Bible for Schools and Colleges, notes that "these words are not found in many of the best MSS. and versions, and they somewhat weaken the force of the argument, which is intended to assert the dignity of the body. They were perhaps inserted by some who, missing the point of the Apostle's argument, thought that the worship of the spirit was unduly passed over."

==== Later insertion of 14:34–35 ====
The most discussed textual integrity question in the letter concerns 1 Corinthians 14:34–35:

Women should be silent in the churches. For they are not permitted to speak but should be subordinate, as the law also says. If there is something they want to learn, let them ask their husbands at home. For it is shameful for a woman to speak in church.

— 1 Corinthians 14:34–35, New Revised Standard Version Updated Edition

===== Manuscript evidence =====
The verses appear in every extant Greek manuscript, but a group of Western manuscripts places them after verse 40 instead: Codex Claromontanus (D), Codex Sangermanensis (E), Codex Augiensis (F), Codex Boernerianus (G) and the original hand of Minuscule 88, together with some Old Latin manuscripts and Ambrosiaster. Bruce M. Metzger notes that these manuscripts are not all independent of one another: Sangermanensis was copied from Claromontanus in the ninth or tenth century and is "of no independent value", while Boernerianus is "closely akin" in its type of text to Augiensis, both of them probably going back to a common archetype one or two generations earlier.

===== Scholarly opinions =====
Joseph Fitzmyer reports that most commentators today treat them as a post-Pauline interpolation from the milieu that produced 1 Timothy 2:11–12 which some believe was not authored by Paul, and lists the view for Johannes Weiss, C. K. Barrett (hesitantly), Gordon Fee, Richard B. Hays, Wolfgang Schrage and Philip B. Payne among others. Fee, who argues the case at length, holds that suspicion arose on external grounds and that the transcriptional question comes first. Hays rests it rather on internal features: the passage stands against 1 Corinthians 11:5, where women pray and prophesy in the assembly; it addresses "the churches" at large, unlike the rest of a letter written to one congregation; and its unqualified appeal to "the law" is uncharacteristic of Paul. Payne has adduced the Latin Codex Fuldensis and scribal abbreviation in Vaticanus as early evidence that the passage was marked as an addition. Proponents differ over the extent of the addition: Hans Conzelmann took the unit to run from verse 33b to verse 36, while Fee and Hays hold that only verses 34 and 35 are text-critically suspect. Scholars such as Bart D. Ehrman also believe that the verses could possibly be interpolated. According to them, these passages interrupt the flow of Paul's argument.

Others defend the verses as Pauline. Raymond Collins judges the arguments for interpolation "not weighty": the Western manuscripts that move the passage are few and closely related, the oldest manuscripts carry it in its usual position, and six of its expressions recur nearby in the letter, among them the appeal to what "the law says" at 1 Corinthians 9:8; Anthony C. Thiselton endorses that assessment. Barrett observes that the dislocation admits of two explanations: copyists may have inserted a marginal note at different points, or they may have moved an original passage that interrupted the discussion of prophecy in order to smooth the text. E. Earle Ellis and Daniel B. Wallace argue that any such marginal note may have been written by Paul himself.

Fitzmyer distinguishes five main lines of interpretation of the passage. He and Collins prefer the reading on which verses 34 and 35 quote a restrictive position held by some Corinthian men, which Paul rebuts with the rhetorical questions of verse 36; Hays, Thiselton and David E. Garland reject it. Thiselton takes the silence to concern a particular kind of speech, and specifically a kind of interrogation during the weighing of prophecy, and not speech in general.

=== Unity ===
Some scholars have held that 1 Corinthians combines material from more than one letter; Johannes Weiss proposed such a division in 1910 and Walter Schmithals, in a series of writings from 1956, first divided the letter into two and later into as many as thirteen. On an analysis associated with Jean Héring, 1 Corinthians 10:1–22 takes a rigorist line on food sacrificed to idols that conflicts with the more permissive treatment at 1 Corinthians 8:1–13 and 1 Corinthians 10:23–11:1, and the passages are assigned to different letters. No manuscript attests any such division, although Barrett holds that this consideration carries no weight, since manuscripts cannot show the state of the text before publication.

Most commentators defend the letter's unity. Gordon Fee holds that the alleged contradictions are "invariably resolvable exegetically", the tension in the idol-food material arising because Paul addresses two related but distinct matters: attendance at sacrificial feasts in pagan shrines, which he forbids, and food bought in the market or served in a private house, which he permits. Fee also identifies a recurring "A-B-A" pattern of argument in the letter, in which a general theological perspective is followed by a digression and then by a specific response. Both Fee and Raymond F. Collins observe that the partition theories do not agree with one another; Collins notes that Weiss and Schmithals each changed their minds about how the letter should be divided, and concludes that "the language of the letter is such that it must be viewed as a single composition", citing sustained defences of unity by John C. Hurd, Helmut Merklein and Dieter Lührmann, and the rhetorical analysis of Margaret M. Mitchell. C. K. Barrett records the view that "no partition theory in regard to 1 Corinthians seems more probable than that Paul simply wrote the letter through, beginning with chapter i and finishing with chapter xvi", adding that the matter is "primarily a question for exegesis". Other scholars likewise argue for the unity of 1 Corinthians 8:1–11:1.

== Structure ==
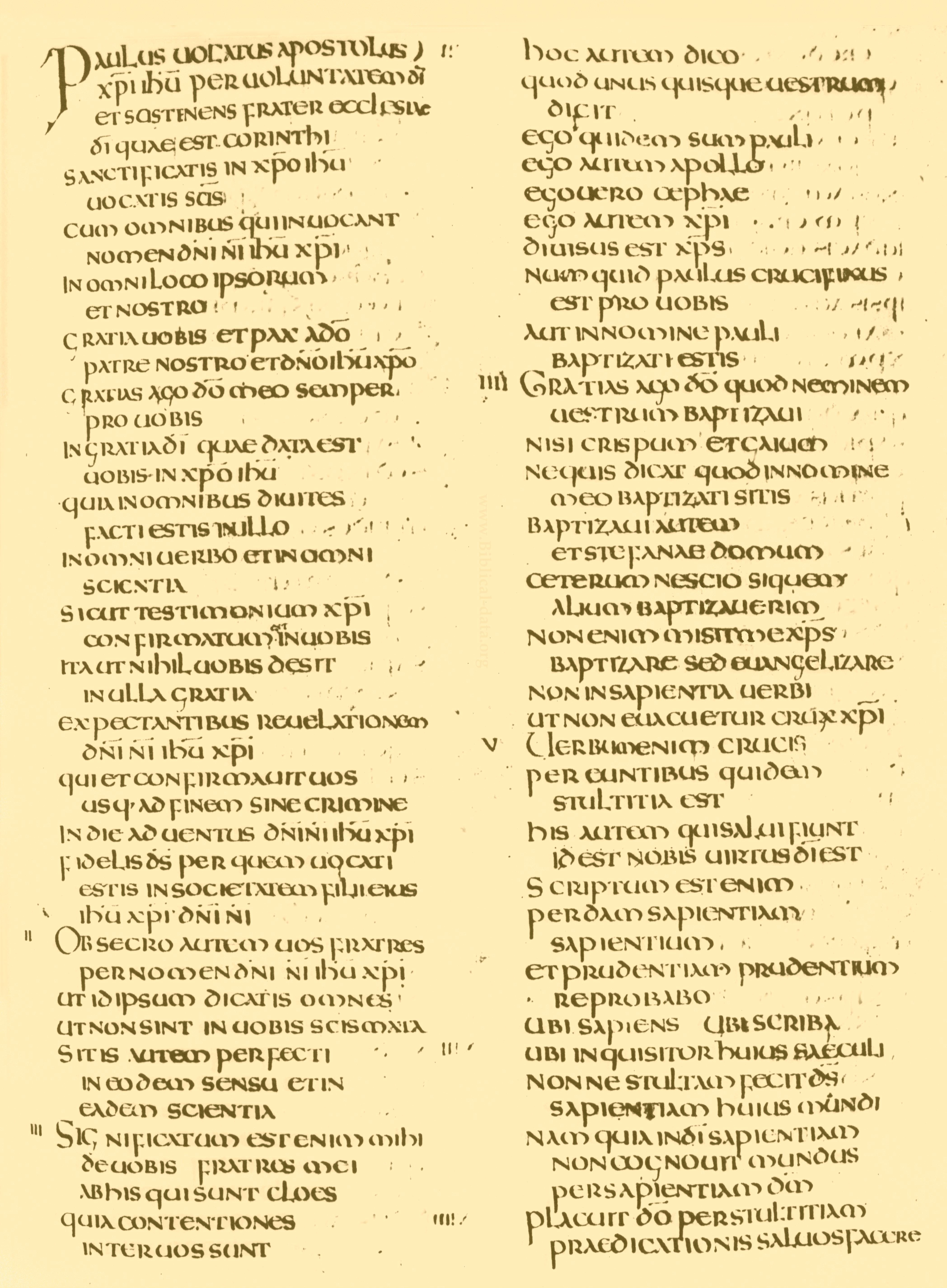
1 Corinthians 1:1–21 in Codex Amiatinus from the 8th century

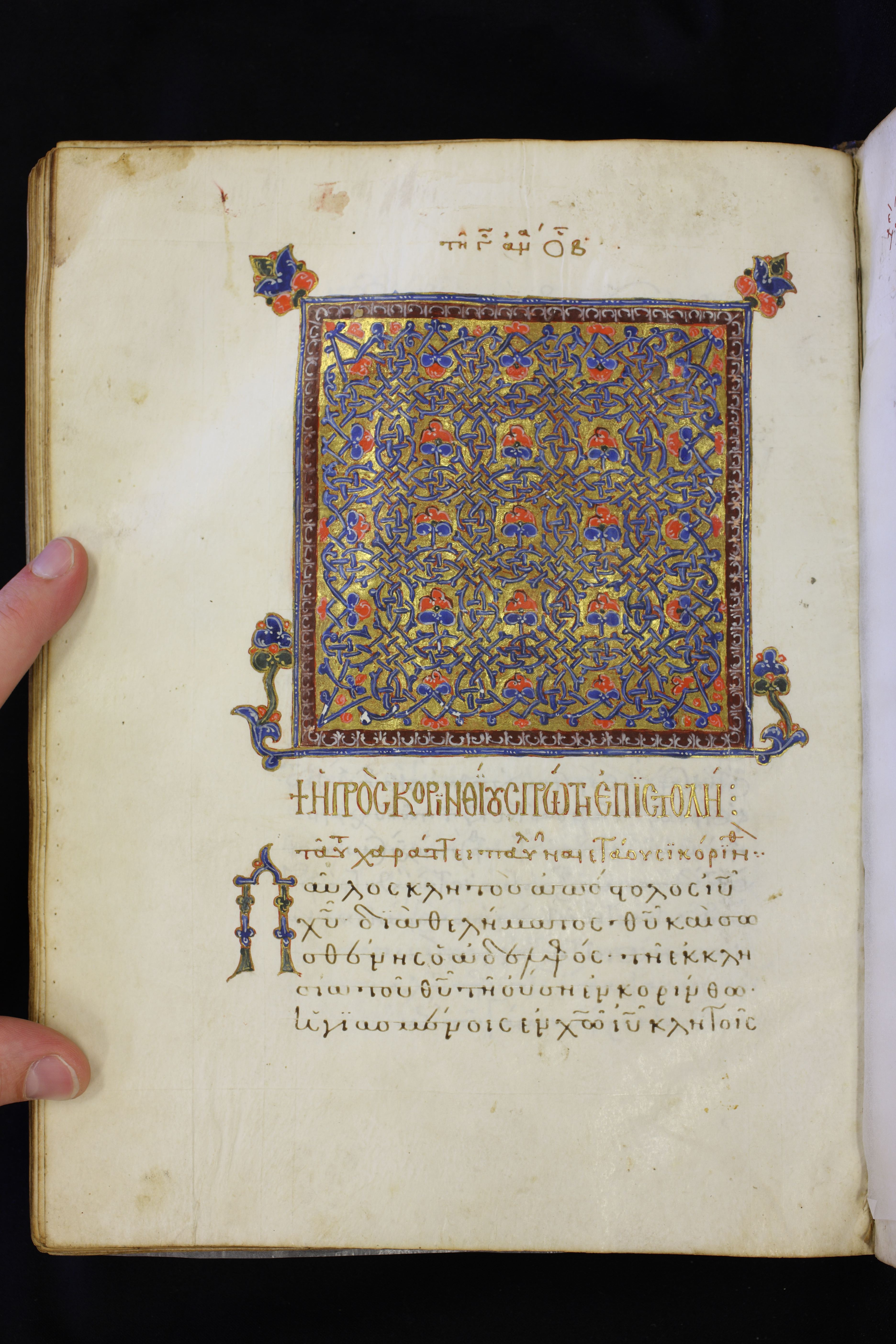
1 Corinthians 1:1–2a in Minuscule 223 from the 14th century

The epistle is generally divided into a number of sections. For example:

- John Barclay argues for five main parts in addition to the opening salutation and thanksgiving, and the closing comments.
- Robertson and Plummer divide the letter into two parts: one part (chapters 1–6) deals with issues raised by "Chloe's people" (see 1 Corinthians 1:11) and the other part (chapters 7-16) addresses issues raised by a delegation (see 1 Corinthians 7:1).
- Daniel B. Wallace sets out six main sections:
1. Salutation (1:1–3) and thanksgiving (1:14–9)
  1. Paul addresses the issue regarding challenges to his apostleship and defends the issue by claiming that it was given to him through a revelation from Christ. The salutation (the first section of the letter) reinforces the legitimacy of Paul's apostolic claim. The thanksgiving part of the letter is typical of Hellenistic letter writing. In a thanksgiving recitation, the writer thanks God for health, a safe journey, deliverance from danger, or good fortune.
  2. In this letter, the thanksgiving "introduces charismata and gnosis, topics to which Paul will return and that he will discuss at greater length later in the letter".
2. Division in Corinth (1:10–4:21)
  1. Facts of division
  2. Causes of division
  3. Cure for division
3. Immorality in Corinth (5:1–6:20)
  1. Discipline an immoral Brother
  2. Resolving personal disputes
  3. Sexual purity
4. Difficulties in Corinth (7:1–14:40)
  1. Marriage
  2. Christian liberty
  3. Worship
5. Doctrine of Resurrection (15:1–58)
6. Closing (16:1–24).

== Content ==
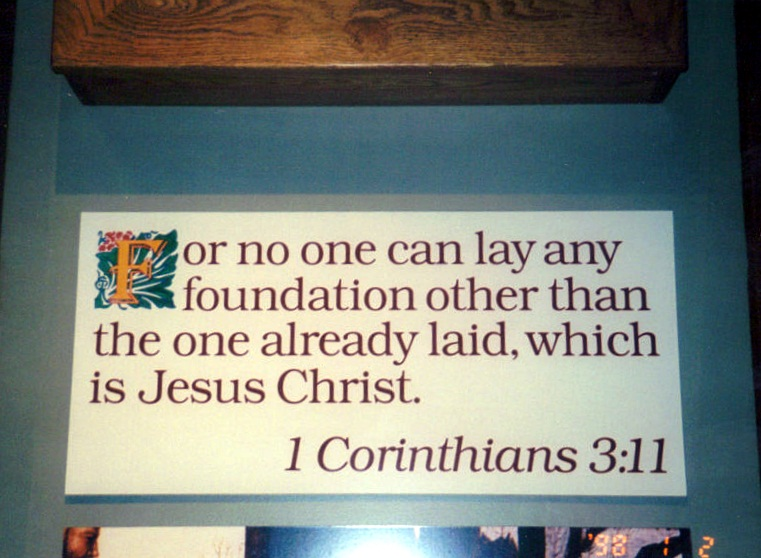
The foundation of Christ (1 Corinthians 3:11); posted at the Menno-Hof Amish and Mennonite Museum in Shipshewana, Indiana

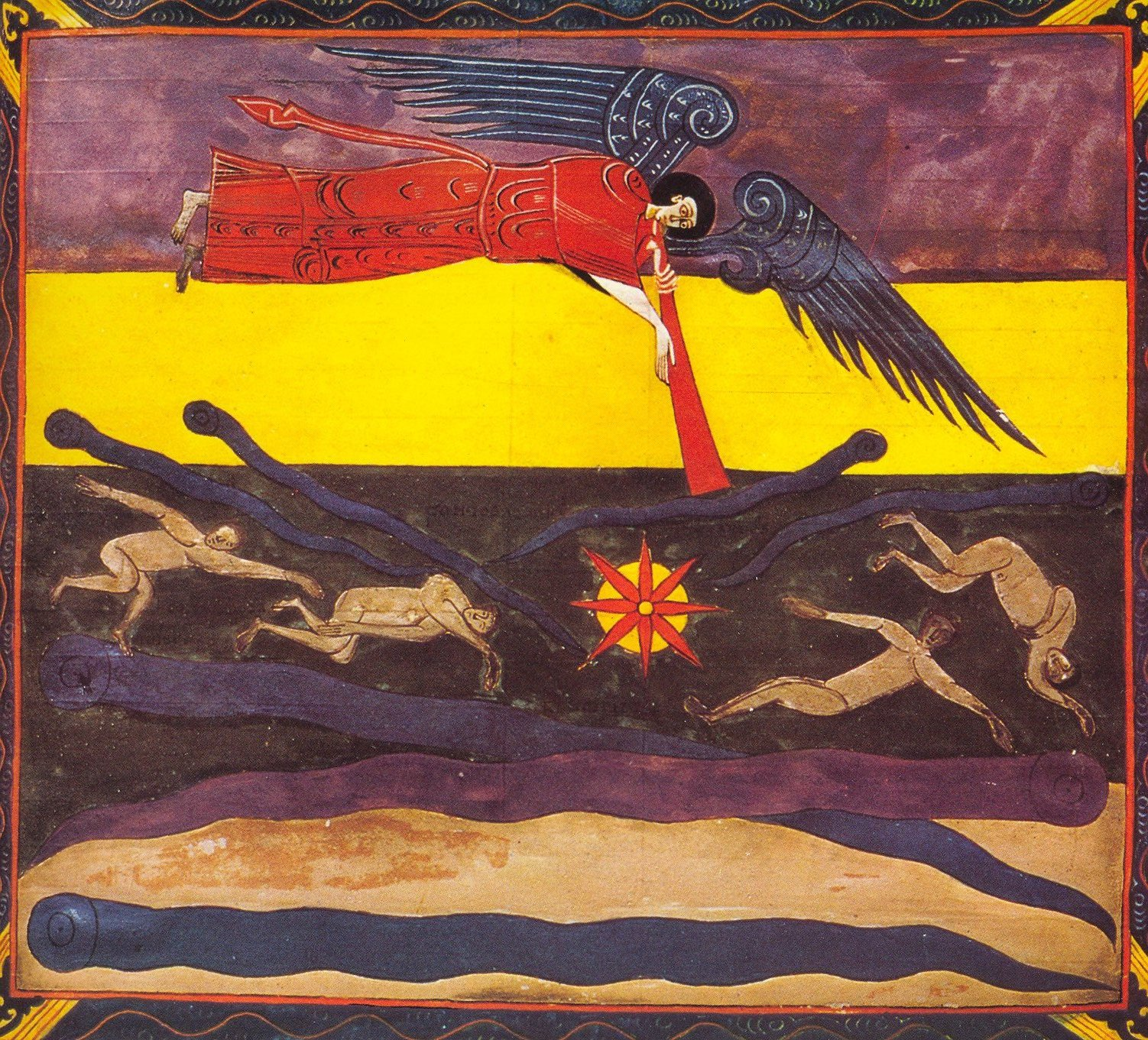
"In a moment, in the twinkling of an eye, at the last trump: for the trumpet shall sound, and the dead shall be raised incorruptible, and we shall be changed." 1 Corinthians 15:52. Illumination from Beatus de Facundus, 1047.

Some time before 2 Corinthians was written, Paul paid the church at Corinth a second visit to check some rising disorder, and wrote them a letter, now lost. The church had also been visited by Apollos, perhaps by Peter, and by some Jewish Christians who brought with them letters of commendation from Jerusalem.

Paul wrote 1 Corinthians letter to correct what he saw as erroneous views in the Corinthian church. Several sources informed Paul of conflicts within the church at Corinth: Apollos, a letter from the Corinthians, "those of Chloe", and finally Stephanas and his two friends who had visited Paul. Paul then wrote this letter to the Corinthians, urging uniformity of belief ("that ye all speak the same thing and that there be no divisions among you", 1:10) and expounding Christian doctrine. Titus and a brother whose name is not given were probably the bearers of the letter to the church at Corinth.

In general, divisions within the church at Corinth seem to be a problem, and Paul makes it a point to mention these conflicts in the beginning. Specifically, pagan roots still hold sway within their community. Paul wants to bring them back to what he sees as correct doctrine, stating that God has given him the opportunity to be a "skilled master builder" to lay the foundation and let others build upon it.

1 Corinthians 6:9–10 contains a notable condemnation of idolatry, thievery, drunkenness, slandering, swindling, adultery, and other acts considered immoral.

Later, Paul wrote about immorality in Corinth by discussing an immoral brother, how to resolve personal disputes, and sexual purity. Regarding marriage, Paul states that it is better for Christians to remain unmarried, but that if they lacked self-control, it is better to marry than "to burn (πυροῦσθαι) with passion". The epistle may include marriage as an apostolic practice in 1 Corinthians 9:5, "Do we not have the right to be accompanied by a believing wife, as do the other apostles and the brothers of the Lord and Cephas (Peter)?" (In the last case, the letter concurs with Matthew 8:14, which mentions Peter having a mother-in-law and thus, by inference, a wife.) However, the Greek word for 'wife' is the same word for 'woman'. The Early Church Fathers, including Tertullian, Jerome, and Augustine state the Greek word is ambiguous and the women in 1 Corinthians 9:5 were women ministering to the Apostles as women ministered to Christ, and were not wives, and assert they left their "offices of marriage" to follow Christ. Paula Fredriksen, an American historian and scholar of early Christianity, regards this verse as evidence that women were embedded in the travelling missionary networks of early Christianity from the beginning.

Paul also argues that married people must please their spouses, just as every Christian must please God.

Throughout the letter, Paul presents issues that are troubling the community in Corinth and offers ways to resolve them. Paul states that this letter serves to "admonish" them as beloved children. They are expected to become imitators of Jesus and follow the ways in Christ as he, Paul, teaches in all his churches.

Paul's closing remarks in his letters usually contain his intentions and efforts to improve the community. He would first conclude with his paraenesis and wish the community peace by including a prayer request, greet them with his name and his friends with a holy kiss, and offer final grace and benediction:

^{1} Now concerning the collection for the saints: you should follow the directions I gave to the churches of Galatia [...] ^{14} Let all that you do be done in love... ^{20} Greet one another with a holy kiss. [...] ^{21} I, Paul, write this greeting with my own hand. ^{22} Let anyone be accursed who has no love for the Lord. Our Lord, come! ^{23} The grace of the Lord Jesus be with you. ^{24} My love be with all of you in Christ Jesus.

— Selected verses from 1 Corinthians 16:1–24

This epistle contains some well-known phrases, including: "all things to all men", "through a glass, darkly", and:

When I was a child, I spoke as a child, I understood as a child, I thought as a child: but when I became a man, I put away childish things.

— 1 Corinthians 13:11, King James Version.

=== "Through a glass, darkly" ===
1 Corinthians 13:12 contrasts seeing "in a mirror dimly" with seeing "face to face". The rendering "through a glass, darkly" originated in the 1560 Geneva Bible, without a comma, and was taken over by the 1611 King James Version, which added one; it has since become a common English expression and has supplied the titles of many works.

=== Women ===
1 Corinthians discusses the place of women more fully than any other letter attributed to Paul, and its statements range widely: from the reciprocal treatment of husband and wife in chapter 7, through the assumption that women pray and prophesy aloud in the assembly (1 Corinthians 11:5), to the direction that women keep silent (1 Corinthians 14:34–35). Scholars differ over how these fit together and over whether Paul's overall stance is better described as broadly egalitarian or as restrictive.

==== Women as coworkers ====
Women appear in the letter as active members of the Corinthian mission. Paul relies for his news of the community's divisions on the household of Chloe (1 Corinthians 1:11), and he closes by sending greetings from Prisca and Aquila, in whose house a church met (1 Corinthians 16:19). Witherington notes that Paul elsewhere in his letters names women among his coworkers, a fact he weighs against a reading of 14:34–35 as a blanket silencing.

==== Marriage and mutuality (1 Corinthians 7) ====
In his instructions on marriage Paul addresses husband and wife in closely parallel terms. He directs spouses to give each other their conjugal due and states that "the wife does not have authority over her own body, but the husband does; likewise the husband does not have authority over his own body, but the wife does" (1 Corinthians 7:4). Gordon Fee describes this as "the full mutuality of men and women in the marital issues" treated in the chapter. Raymond Collins observes that the parallel statements of verses 2 to 4 treat women and men alike, marked by the repeated "likewise" (ὁμοίως δὲ καί, homoiōs de kai, "and likewise also"), and concludes that "equality within the sexual relationship is the norm". Ben Witherington III argues that Paul organises the chapter around the conviction of Galatians 3:28 that there is "no male and female ... in Christ", applying it to questions of marriage, virginity, and celibacy. Craig Keener likewise reads Paul as adapting the conventions of his day "in the direction of mutuality".

Commentators set this reciprocity against the broadly patriarchal norms of Greco-Roman society, while cautioning that Paul was not without precedent. Collins notes that Paul's language "resonates with the moralists' discussion of sexuality" and echoes Stoic writers such as Hierocles and Antipater, for whom mutuality in marriage, including a shared claim on one another's body, was a recurring theme. Keener places Paul within this "particularly progressive stream" among his contemporaries, comparing him to the Stoic philosopher Musonius Rufus, rather than treating him as an isolated voice.

==== Women must remain silent ====
See also § Later insertion of 14:34–35

In 1 Corinthians 14:34–35, it is stated that women must remain silent in the churches, and yet in 1 Corinthians 11:2–16 it states they have a role of prophecy and apparently speaking tongues in churches. Many theories have emerged attempting to reconcile these two passages.

Other commentators identify a conflict with Romans 16:1,7, where Paul praises the activities of female church leaders.

Other scholars hold that verses 34–35 are authentic but address a specific situation in the Corinthian assembly rather than silencing all women in every church, so that the restriction does not conflict with 1 Corinthians 11:5, where women pray and prophesy.

One theory to resolve the tension between these texts by positing that wives were either contesting their husband's inspired speeches at church, or the wives/women were chatting and asking questions in a disorderly manner when others were giving inspired utterances. According to this view, their silence was unique to the particular situation in the Corinthian gatherings at that time, and Paul did not intend his words to be universalized for all women of all churches of all eras.

According to Craig Keener, "When Paul suggests that husbands should teach their wives at home, his point is not to belittle women's ability to learn. To the contrary, Paul is advocating the most progressive view of his day: despite the possibility that she is less educated than himself, the husband should recognize his wife's intellectual capability and therefore make himself responsible for her education..." He argues that the women in view were relatively uneducated wives who were disrupting the meeting with questions, and that Paul's remedy was for them to raise their questions at home, with education as the longer-term solution. Keener compares the instruction to 1 Corinthians 11:34 ("if anyone is hungry, let him eat at home"), which addresses disruptive conduct rather than forbidding the activity itself. He reads Paul's direction that husbands teach their wives at home as progressive for its setting: "the husband should recognize his wife's intellectual capability and therefore make himself responsible for her education".

Ben Witherington III likewise treats the verses as genuinely Pauline. He observes that Paul supports the instruction with an unusual accumulation of authorities, appealing to general church practice, the law, what is proper, the word of God, and his own apostolic authority, which Witherington takes as a strong mark of authenticity. Following James Hurley, he suggests the women were wives who claimed the gift of weighing or judging prophecy (cf. 1 Corinthians 14:29) and were questioning prophets, including their own husbands, in a way that overstepped; on this view the silence and "subordination" of verse 34 concern that specific practice, not speech in general.

Other scholars including Joseph Fitzmyer suggest that in verses 34–35, Paul may be quoting the position of some native Corinthian Christians regarding women who have been speaking out in cultic assemblies in order that he can then argue against it.

Kirk MacGregor believes Paul may be quoting the Corinthian men's prohibition of women speaking in assemblies in order to rebuke it. He argues the quotation starts at verse 33b with the adverb "As" Ὡς (Hōs) and ends with verse 35, with Paul's rebuke starting at verse 36 with "Or" ἢ (ē). He states this conjunction is used in 1 Cor (1:13, 6:16, 9:6, 11:22) to argue against the Corinthians' position and in 1 Cor (6:2, 10:22) to argue against a Corinthian practice. He also references other times in this first epistle where Paul quotes the Corinthians. In 1 Cor 6:12–13 “All things are permitted for me,” (NRSVue) twice. In 1 Cor 7:1–2 “It is good for a man not to touch a woman.” (NRSVue). In 1 Cor 8:1 "all of us possess knowledge." (NRSVue). In 1 Cor 10:23 "All things are permitted," (NRSVue) twice. In 1 Cor 14:36 (NRSVue) the sentence is as such: "Or" ἢ (ē) > "are you" ὑμᾶς (hymas) > "the only [ones]" μόνους (monous), ending with an accusative masculine plural adjective. Due to Koine Greek being an inflected language, the gender of each Greek adjective must agree grammatically with the gender of the word that it's modifying. MacGregor outlines the lack of the feminine plural "monas" as further evidence towards his argument. He posits that Paul did not explicitly identify the false statement by the Corinthians due to the letter being specifically directed to them and that they already knew their own belief in this.

This quotation reading has been questioned. Ben Witherington III argues that the masculine μόνους (monous, "only") of verse 36 carries no special weight, since the whole passage is cast in the masculine and the form is "simply the gender-inclusive masculine as elsewhere in this chapter"; he concludes that the proposals of Odell-Scott and others "raise more questions than they answer", and that Paul is more probably anticipating the Corinthians' reaction to his own argument. Craig Keener, following D. A. Carson, similarly holds that the masculine of verse 36 "deprives the use of the masculine here of any evidential value".

==== Head covering ====
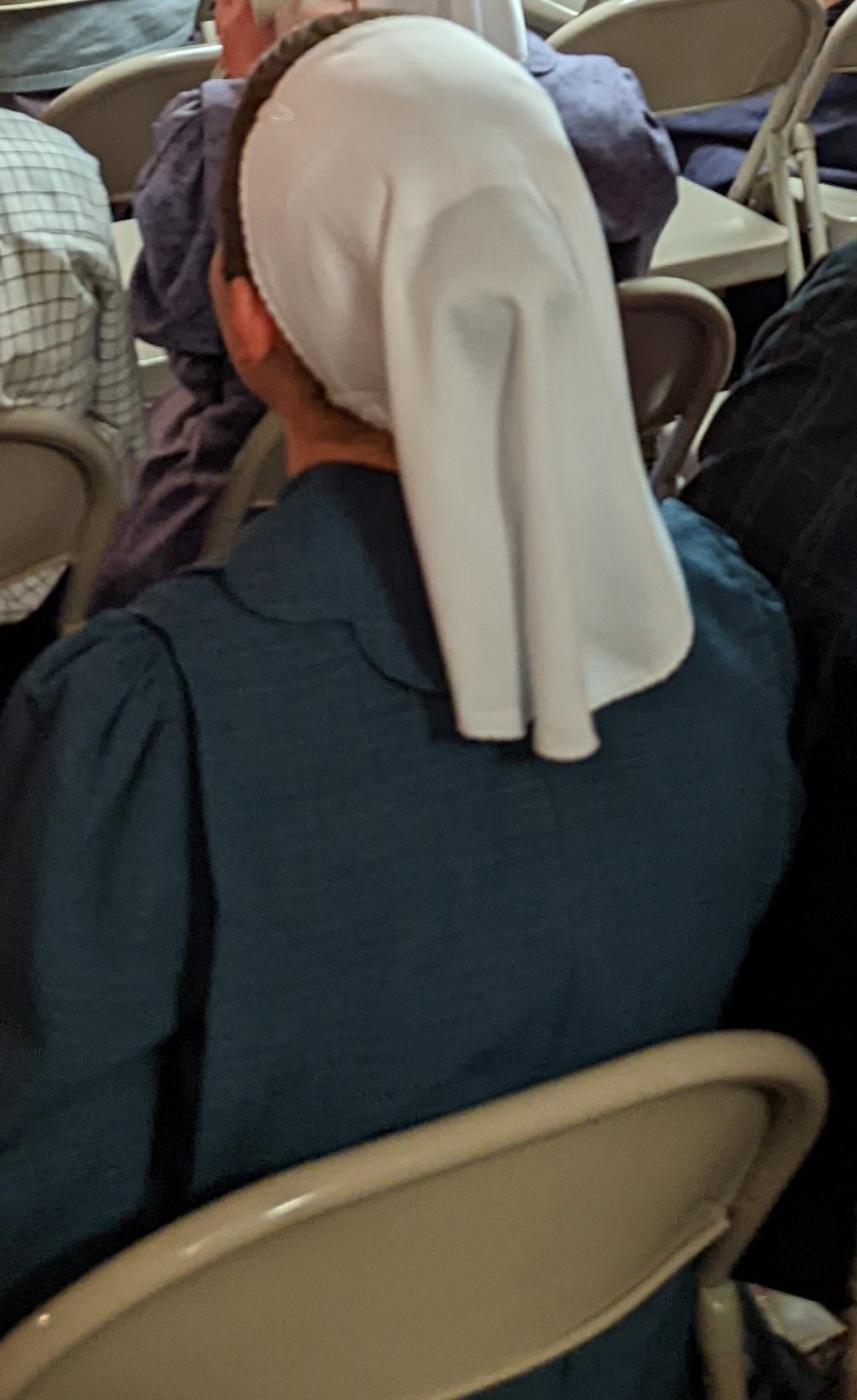
An opaque hanging veil worn by a Conservative Anabaptist woman belonging to the Charity Christian Fellowship

1 Corinthians 11:2–16 contains an admonishment that Christian women cover their hair while praying and that Christian men leave their heads uncovered while praying. These practices were countercultural; the surrounding pagan Greek women prayed unveiled and Jewish men prayed with their heads covered.

The King James Version of 1 Corinthians 11:10 reads "For this cause ought the woman to have power on her head because of the angels," where "power" represents the Greek word exousia. Exousia is the subject of significant debate as to how it should best be translated. Other versions translate it as "authority". In many early biblical manuscripts (such as certain Vulgate, Coptic, and Armenian manuscripts), it is rendered with the word "veil" (κάλυμμα, kalumma) rather than the word "authority" (ἐξουσία, exousia); the Revised Standard Version reflects this, displaying 1 Corinthians 11:10 as follows: "That is why a woman ought to have a veil on her head, because of the angels." Similarly, a scholarly footnote in the New American Bible notes that presence of the word "authority (exousia) may possibly be due to mistranslation of an Aramaic word for veil". This mistranslation may be due to "the fact that in Aramaic the roots of the word power and veil are spelled the same." The last-known living connection to the apostles, Irenaeus, penned verse 10 using the word "veil" (κάλυμμα, kalumma) instead of "authority" (ἐξουσία, exousia) in Against Heresies, as did other Church Fathers in their writings, including Hippolytus, Origen, Chrysostom, Jerome, Epiphanius, Augustine, and Bede.

Scholars have propounded various meanings of the phrase "because of the angels" in v. 10. According to Dale Martin, Paul is concerned that angels may look lustfully at beautiful women, as the "sons of God" in Genesis 6 apparently did. Noting the similarity between the Greek word translated "veil" and the Greek word for a seal or cork of a wine jug, Martin theorizes that the veil acted not only to conceal the beauty of a woman's hair, but also as a symbolic protective barrier that "sealed" the woman against the influence of fallen angels. Other scholars, such as Joseph Fitzmyer, believe the angels spoken of here are not fallen angels looking lustfully at women, but good angels who watch over church services. Notably, the author of Hebrews mentions "entertaining angels" and evidence from the Dead Sea Scrolls suggests some Second Temple era Jews believed angels attended synagogue services. According to this view, Paul's concern is not that an angel looks lustfully, but simply that the appearance of an inappropriately dressed women might offend the heavenly guardians. A third interpretation comes from Bruce Winter, who theorizes that the "angels" spoken of are not heavenly beings at all, but simply human visitors. Winter notes that the Greek word translated "angels" literally means "messengers" and could refer to a visitor carrying a letter from afar, possibly even the epistle itself. In this view, Paul is concerned that if a visitor to a church service sees a married woman with her head uncovered, he may judge that woman to be promiscuous. Thus, Paul seeks to protect the church community's honor by ensuring that all members appear above reproach.

The head covering ordinance continued to be handed down after the apostolic era to the next generations of Christians; writing 150 years after Paul, the early Christian apologist Tertullian stated that the women of the church in Corinth – both virgins and married – practiced veiling, given that Paul the Apostle delivered the teaching to them: "the Corinthians themselves understood him in this manner. In fact, at this very day, the Corinthians do veil their virgins. What the apostles taught, their disciples approve." From the period of the early Church to the late modern period, 1 Corinthians 11 was understood by many to enjoin the wearing of the headcovering throughout the day – a practice that has since waned in Western Europe but has continued in certain parts of the world, such as in the Middle East, Eastern Europe, Northern Africa and the Indian subcontinent, as well as everywhere by Conservative Anabaptists (such as the Conservative Mennonite Churches and the Dunkard Brethren Church), who count veiling as being one of the ordinances of the Church. The early Church Father John Chrysostom explicates that 1 Corinthians 11 enjoins the continual wearing the headcovering by referencing Paul the Apostle's view that being shaven is always dishonourable and his pointing to the angels.

=== Agape ===
1 Corinthians 13 is one of many definitional sources for the original Greek word ἀγάπη, agape. In the original Greek, the word ἀγάπη, agape is used throughout chapter 13. This is translated into English as "charity" in the King James version; but the word "love" is preferred by most other translations, both earlier and more recent.

1 Corinthians 11:17–34 contains a condemnation of what the authors consider inappropriate behavior at Corinthian gatherings that appeared to be agape feasts.

=== Resurrection ===
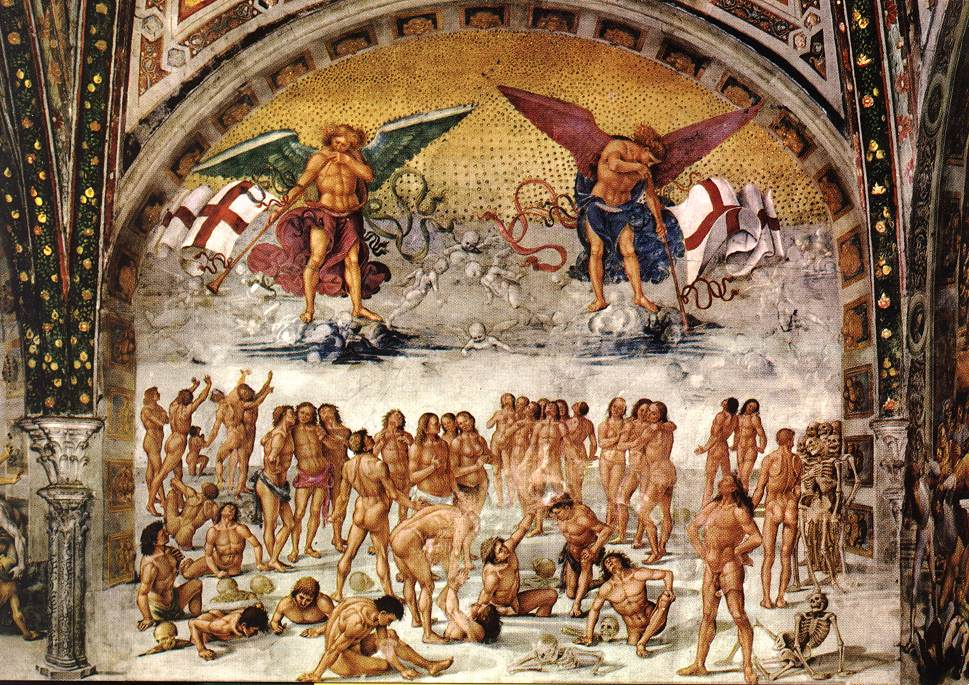
Resurrection of the Flesh (c. 1500) by Luca Signorelli – based on 1 Corinthians 15:52: "the trumpet shall sound, and the dead shall be raised incorruptible, and we shall be changed." Chapel of San Brizio, Orvieto Cathedral, Italy

After discussing his views on worshipping idols, Paul ends the letter with his views on resurrection and the Resurrection of Jesus.

Most scholars agree that Paul was reinforcing earlier tradition about resurrection noting that he describes the kerygma as "received". (Note: Early kerygma: Neufeld, The Earliest Christian Confessions (Grand Rapids: Eerdmans, 1964) p. 47; Reginald Fuller, The Formation of the Resurrection Narratives (New York: Macmillan, 1971) p. 10 (ISBN 0-281-02475-8); Wolfhart Pannenberg, Jesus – God and Man translated Lewis Wilkins and Duane Pribe (Philadelphia: Westminster, 1968) p. 90 (ISBN 0-664-20818-5); Oscar Cullmann, The Early Church: Studies in Early Christian History and Theology, ed. A. J. B. Higgins (Philadelphia: Westminster, 1966) p. 64; Hans Conzelmann, 1 Corinthians, translated James W. Leitch (Philadelphia: Fortress 1975) p. 251 (ISBN 0-8006-6005-6); Bultmann, Theology of the New Testament vol. 1 pp. 45, 80–82, 293; R. E. Brown, The Virginal Conception and Bodily Resurrection of Jesus (New York: Paulist Press, 1973) pp. 81, 92 (ISBN 0-8091-1768-1); Goulder, Michael, The Baseless Fabric of a Vision (as quoted in Gavin D'Costa's Resurrection Reconsidered), p. 48, 1996)

For I handed on to you as of first importance what I in turn had received: that Christ died for our sins in accordance with the scriptures and that he was buried and that he was raised on the third day in accordance with the scriptures and that he appeared to Cephas, then to the twelve. Then he appeared to more than five hundred brothers and sisters at one time, most of whom are still alive, though some have died. Then he appeared to James, then to all the apostles.

— 1 Corinthians 15:3–7, NRSVue

It may be one of the earliest kerygmas about Jesus' death and resurrection.

Chapter 15 closes with an account of the nature of the resurrection, claiming that in the Last Judgement the dead will be raised and both the living and the dead transformed into "spiritual bodies" (verse 44).

=== Psalm 8 reference ===
1 Corinthians 15:27 refers to Psalm 8:6. Ephesians 1:22 also refers to this verse of Psalm 8.

=== Evil company corrupts good habits ===
1 Corinthians 15:33 contains the aphorism "evil company corrupts good habits", from classical Greek literature. According to the church historian Socrates of Constantinople it is taken from a Greek tragedy of Euripides, but modern scholarship, following Jerome, attributes it to the comedy Thaĩs by Menander, or Menander quoting Euripides. Hans Conzelmann remarks that the quotation was widely known. Whatever the proximate source, this quote does appear in one of the fragments of Euripides' works.

=== Baptism of the dead ===
1 Corinthians 15:29 argues it would be pointless to baptise the dead if people are not raised from the dead. This verse suggests that there existed a practice at Corinth whereby a living person would be baptized in the stead of some convert who had recently died. Teignmouth Shore, writing in Ellicott's Commentary for Modern Readers, notes that among the "numerous and ingenious conjectures" about this passage, the only tenable interpretation is that there existed a practice of baptising a living person to substitute those who had died before that sacrament could have been administered in Corinth, as also existed among the Marcionites in the second century, or still earlier than that, among a sect called "the Corinthians". The Jerusalem Bible states that "What this practice was is unknown. Paul does not say if he approved of it or not: he uses it merely for an ad hominem argument".

The Latter Day Saint movement interprets this passage to support the practice of baptism for the dead. This principle of vicarious work for the dead is an important work of the Church of Jesus Christ of Latter-day Saints in the dispensation of the fulness of times. This interpretation is rejected by other Christian denominations.

== Commentaries ==
John Chrysostom, an early Church Father and archbishop of Constantinople, wrote a commentary on 1 Corinthians, formed by 44 homilies.

== See also ==
- Pauline privilege
- Second Epistle to the Corinthians
- Textual variants in the First Epistle to the Corinthians
- Third Epistle to the Corinthians

== Notes ==
First Epistle to the Corinthians Pauline Epistle
| Preceded by Romans | New Testament; Books of the Bible | Succeeded by Second Corinthians |
