= Through a Lens Darkly (disambiguation) =

Through a Lens Darkly is a 2014 American documentary film.

Through a Lens Darkly may also refer to:

- "Through a Lens Darkly" (Daria), a 1999 TV episode
- "Through a Lens Darkly" (Nowhere Man), a 1996 TV episode
- Through a Lens Darkly, a 2008 memoir by Jan Wahl
- "Through a Lens Darkly", a 2009 short story by Geoffrey Maloney
- "Through a Lens, Darkly", a 1982 House of Mystery comics story by Todd Klein

== See also ==
- Through a Glass Darkly (disambiguation)
