= Karleen Koen =

American novelist

- Born: Karleen Smith; New York City, New York
- Education: Bachelor of Arts
- Alma mater: North Texas State University
- Occupations: Author, historian
- Writing career
- Language: English
- Period: Seventeenth and eighteenth century England and France
- Genre: Historical fiction
- Notable work: Through a Glass Darkly
- Website: karleenkoen.net

Karleen Koen (née Smith) is an American novelist perhaps best known for her 1986 debut historical fiction novel, Through a Glass Darkly.

== Personal life ==
Karleen Smith grew up near Houston, Texas. In 1970, she majored in English and graduated from North Texas State University. Koen became the first managing editor of Houston Home & Garden and then its editor. She decided to leave in order to focus on family. In 2011 she attended the annual conference of the Historical Novel Society alongside Diana Gabaldon and Margaret George, among others.

== Literary career ==
To help pass the dull hours at home, Koen began writing a historical fiction novel on her favorite time period, the eighteenth-century. The book centered on teenage noblewoman Barbara Alderley and her trials and travails as she navigates English and French society. To gain a publisher for her work, now called Through a Glass Darkly, Koen sent the manuscript to Jean Naggar, whose name she found in Writer's Digest. Naggar encouraged Koen to continue finishing the book; believing it to be "the launching of a major author," Naggar mailed the manuscript to five major publishing companies; Random House purchased it for a "whopping" $350,000 in August 1985, which was at the time a record for a new novelist. Koen and her husband used some of this money to purchase a three-bedroom house in Houston.

Koen began work on her second novel soon after Through a Glass Darkly was purchased for print. She titled it Now Face to Face, and described it as ""a continuation and completion of Barbara's story and it involves [her cousin] Tony and the themes of bonding, family and love – and I don't mean sex."

Her writing influences include Winston Graham, Daphne du Maurier, and Mary Stewart.

== Works ==
- Through a Glass Darkly (1986)
- Now Face to Face (1995)
- Dark Angels (2006)
- Before Versailles (2011)

== See also ==
- List of romantic novelists
