= Raymond Collins (priest) =

American Roman Catholic priest

Raymond Francis Collins is an American Roman Catholic priest of the Diocese of Providence, and an exegete of the New Testament. Recently retired, he has taught as a professor at a variety of institutions of higher education, including most prominently Katholieke Universiteit Leuven and the Catholic University of America. He also served the American College of the Immaculate Conception as its ninth rector.

== Early life and education ==
Collins was born in Providence, Rhode Island, on 12 May 1935. He completed his primary and secondary education within his home state. He became a seminarian for the diocese of Providence, and his bishop, Russell McVinney, sent him for theological studies at the newly reopened American College of the Immaculate Conception in 1953. At the Catholic University of Leuven, he obtained a Bachelor of Sacred Theology in 1959 and a License in Sacred Theology in 1961. In 1962, only a year after completing his license, he successfully defended his doctoral dissertation, which was entitled The Berith-Notion of the Cairo Damascus Covenant and its Comparison with the New Testament.

== Teacher and rector ==
Returning to the United States as a young priest, he taught New Testament first at Our Lady of Providence Seminary, and moral theology at Pope John XXIII National Seminary. With the division of the Catholic University of Leuven in 1968, Collins returned to Leuven to teach New Testament. In 1971, he was appointed rector of the American College of the Immaculate Conception, his alma mater, where he had been living since his return to Leuven.

As rector of the seminary and, starting in 1977, a full professor at the Katholieke Universiteit Leuven, Collins strengthened the relationship between the two institutions, and was heavily involved in the cooperative effort to produce the English-language theological journal Louvain Studies. At the American College, he expanded the pastoral formation program for the seminarians, opened up the college's doors to graduate studies for priests and religious, and started the college's sabbatical program.

Collins' term as rector of the American College came to a close in 1978, and he thereafter focused more on academic pursuits. He briefly took up a part-time position teaching at the University of Notre Dame, but then returned to Leuven full-time until 1993. That year, he left Leuven for a position as a professor of New Testament at the Catholic University of America, where he taught until his retirement in 2006. He now celebrates Mass occasionally at St. Luke's, a parish in the Diocese of Providence.

== Partial list of publications ==
- Introduction to the New Testament. Galilee Trade, 1987.
- Preaching the Epistles. Paulist Press, 1995.
- Sexual Ethics and The New Testament : Behavior & Belief. Herder and Herder, 2000.
- 1 & 2 Timothy and Titus: A Commentary. Westminster John Knox Press, 2002.
- First Corinthians (Sacra Pagina Series). Liturgical Press, 2007.
- Second Corinthians (Paideia: Commentaries on the New Testament). Baker Academic, 2013.
- Divorce in the New Testament. Michael Glazier Books, 1992.
- The Many Faces of the Church: A New Testament Study. Herder & Herder, 2004.
- Letters That Paul Did Not Write: The Epistle to the Hebrews and the Pauline Pseudepigrapha. Wipf & Stock Publishers, 2005.
- Birth Of The New Testament: The Origin & Development of the First Christian Generation. Herder & Herder, 1993.
- John and His Witness. Liturgical Press, 1991.
- These Things Have Been Written: Studies on the Fourth Gospel. Eerdmans Publishing Company, 1991.
- Wealth, Wages and the Wealthy - New Testament Insight for Preachers and Teachers. Liturgical Press, 2017.

Preceded by Clement E. Pribil	American College Rector; 1971– 1978	Succeeded by William J. Greytak
