= Through a Glass, Darkly (poem) =

Poem by George Patton

- by George S. Patton
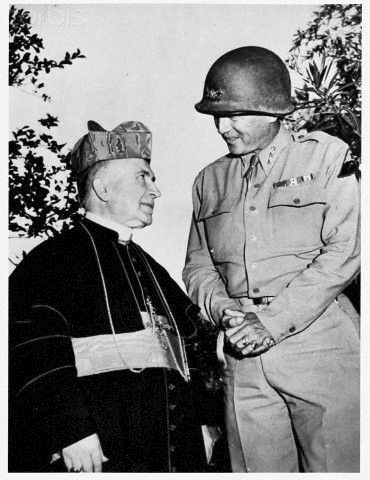
- Patton meeting Roman Catholic cardinal Luigi Lavitrano after invading Sicily in 1943
- Written: 27 May 1922
- Country: United States
- Language: English
- Rhyme scheme: XAXA
- Lines: 96

"Through a Glass, Darkly" is a poem by American General George S. Patton, which explores Patton's strong beliefs in Christianity and reincarnation through stories of his previous lives and deaths in combat during historic battles. Patton questions whether he may have participated in the Crucifixion of Jesus, imagines previous lives as a hunter-gatherer in search of mammoth, and explores historic battles, including the Greco-Persian Wars (499–449 BC), Siege of Tyre (332 BC), Roman–Parthian Wars (54 BC – 217 AD), Battle of Crécy (1346), and Battle of Waterloo (1815). He concludes that he is an instrument of God eternally betrothed to combat. The title of the poem is the first words of 1 Corinthians 13:12.

The poem explicates Patton's theory that "one is reincarnated…with certain traits and tendencies invariable." In it, Patton includes three constants in his conception of reincarnation: he is always reborn as a male; he is always reborn as a fighter; and he retains some awareness of previous lives and incarnations.

== Text ==
Through the travail of the ages,
Midst the pomp and toil of war,
I have fought and strove and perished
Countless times upon this star.

In the form of many people
In all panoplies of time
Have I seen the luring vision
Of the Victory Maid, sublime.

I have battled for fresh mammoth,
I have warred for pastures new,
I have listened to the whispers
When the race trek instinct grew.

I have known the call to battle
In each changeless changing shape
From the high souled voice of conscience
To the beastly lust for rape.

I have sinned and I have suffered,
Played the hero and the knave;
Fought for belly, shame, or country,
And for each have found a grave.

I cannot name my battles
For the visions are not clear,
Yet, I see the twisted faces
And I feel the rending spear.

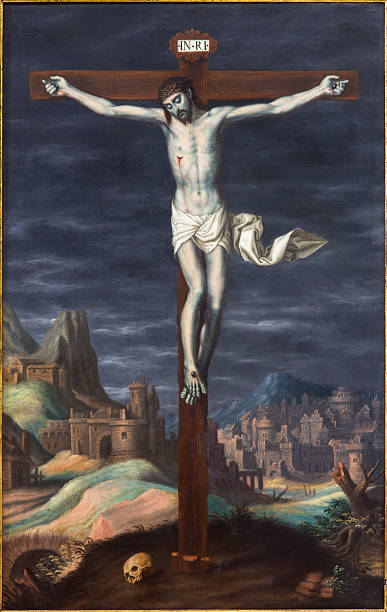
The crucifixion of Jesus as depicted by Juan Sánchez Cotán.

Perhaps I stabbed our Savior
In His sacred helpless side.
Yet, I’ve called His name in blessing
When in after times I died.

In the dimness of the shadows
Where we hairy heathens warred,
I can taste in thought the lifeblood;
We used teeth before the sword.

While in later clearer vision
I can sense the coppery sweat,
Feel the pikes grow wet and slippery
When our Phalanx, Cyrus met.

Hear the rattle of the harness
Where the Persian darts bounced clear,
See their chariots wheel in panic
From the Hoplite’s leveled spear.

See the goal grow monthly longer,
Reaching for the walls of Tyre.
Hear the crash of tons of granite,
Smell the quenchless eastern fire.

Still more clearly as a Roman,
Can I see the Legion close,
As our third rank moved in forward
And the short sword found our foes.

Once again I feel the anguish
Of that blistering treeless plain
When the Parthian showered death bolts,
And our discipline was in vain.

I remember all the suffering
Of those arrows in my neck.
Yet, I stabbed a grinning savage
As I died upon my back.

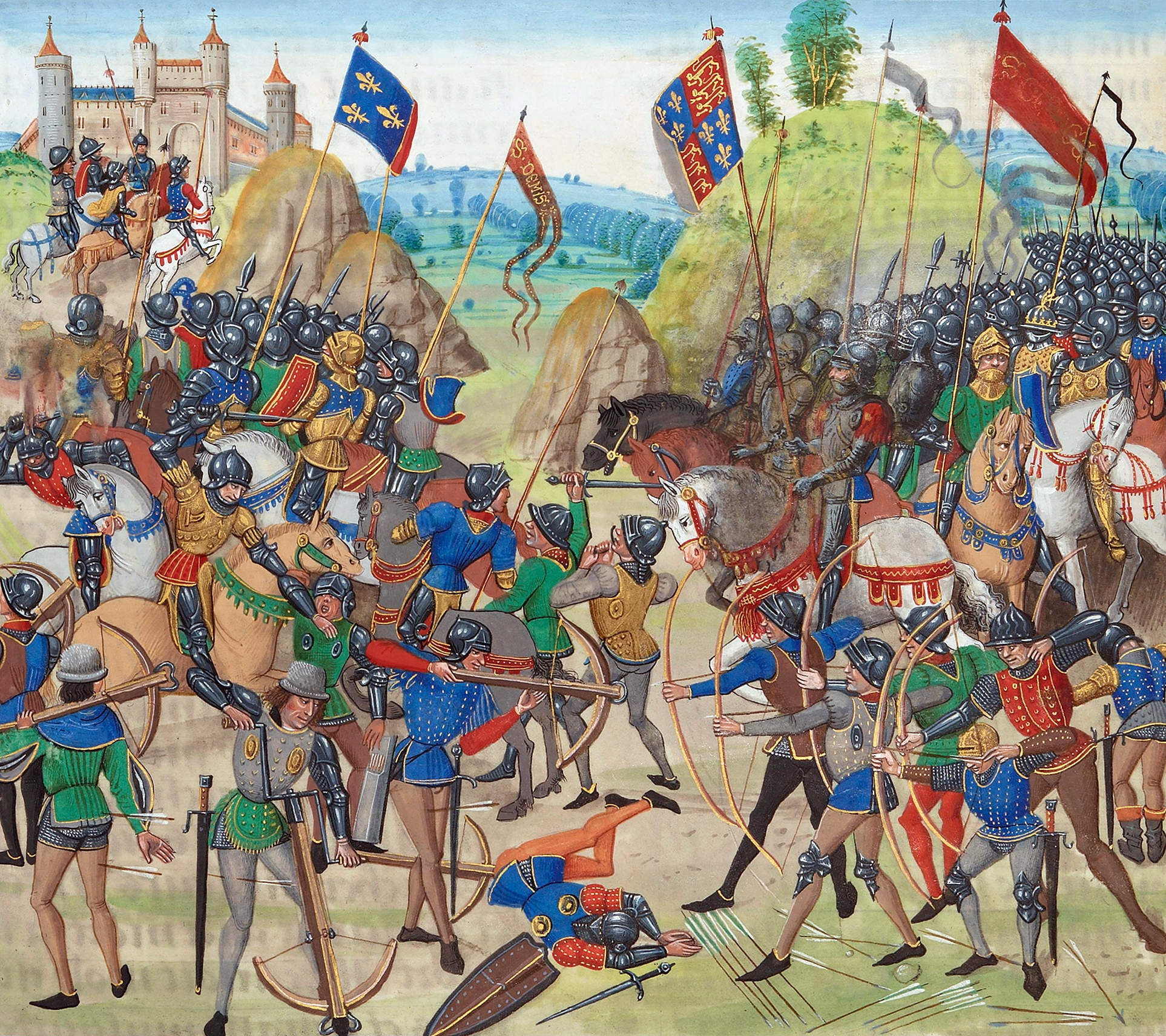
The Battle of Crecy, part of the Hundred Years' War

Once again I smell the heat sparks
When my Flemish plate gave way
And the lance ripped through my entrails
As on Crecy’s field I lay.

In the windless, blinding stillness
Of the glittering tropic sea
I can see the bubbles rising
Where we set the captives free.

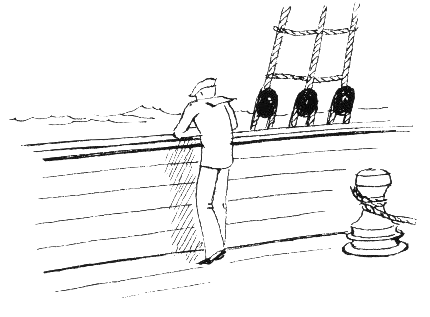
A bulwark is the area of the ships side which extends above the deck.

Midst the spume of half a tempest
I have heard the bulwarks go
When the crashing, point blank round shot
Sent destruction to our foe.

I have fought with gun and cutlass
On the red and slippery deck
With all Hell aflame within me
And a rope around my neck.

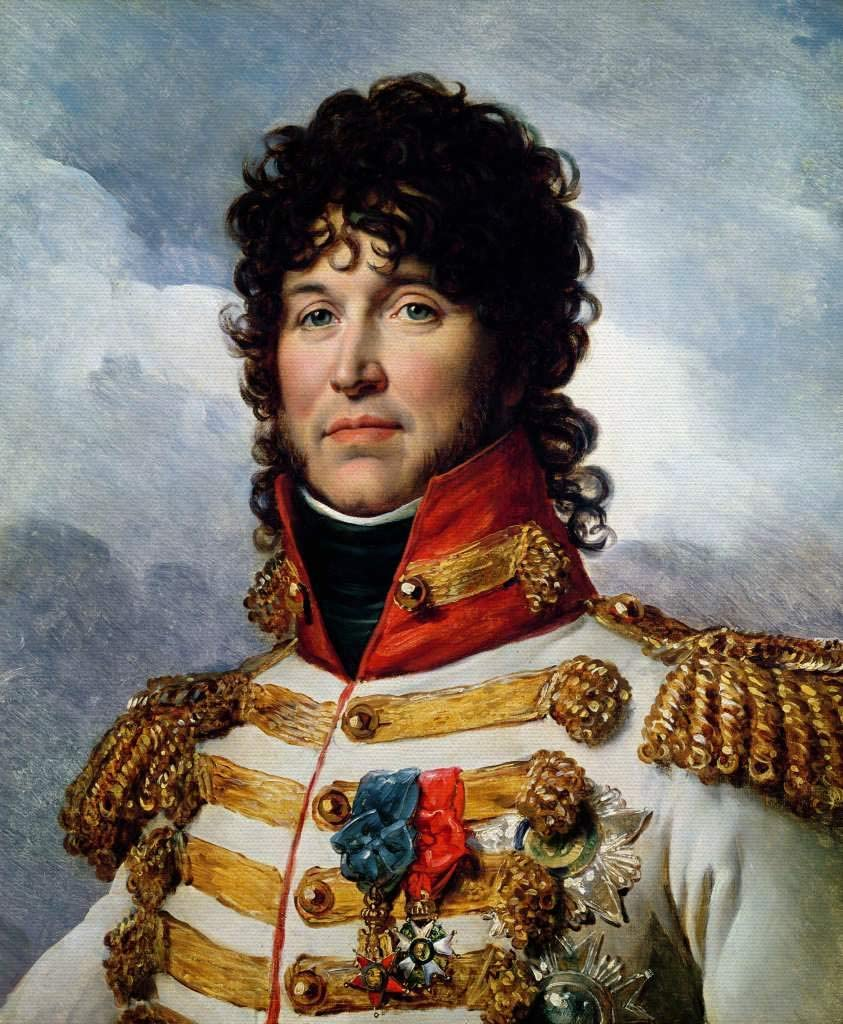
Joachim Murat, a French officer during the Napoleonic invasions of Russia and Jena

And still later as a General
Have I galloped with Murat
When we laughed at death and numbers
Trusting in the Emperor's Star.

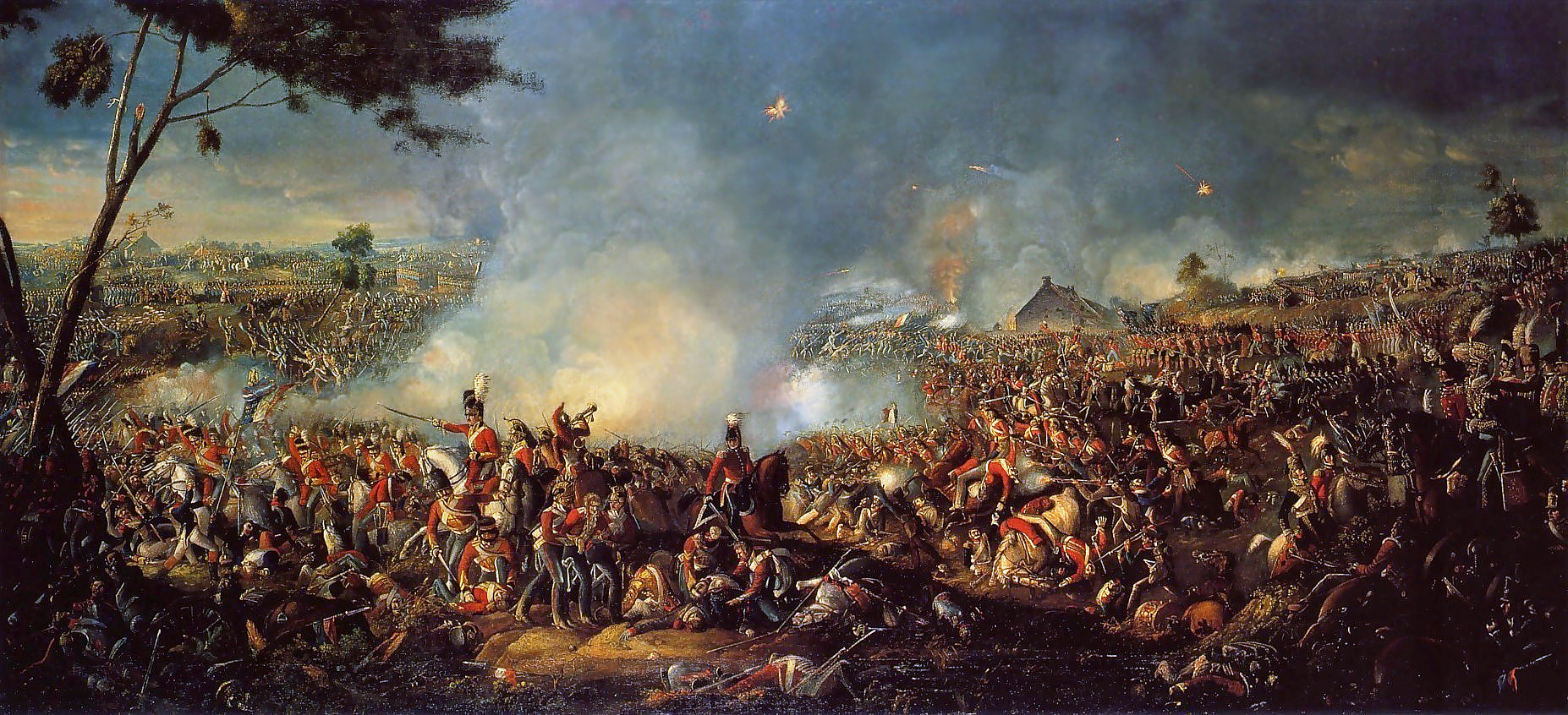
The Battle of Waterloo at Ohain, Belgium, where the sunken lanes were popularized by Victor Hugo's Les Misérables (1862).

Till at last our star faded,
And we shouted to our doom
Where the sunken road of Ohein
Closed us in its quivering gloom.

So but now with Tanks a’clatter
Have I waddled on the foe
Belching death at twenty paces,
By the star shell’s ghastly glow.

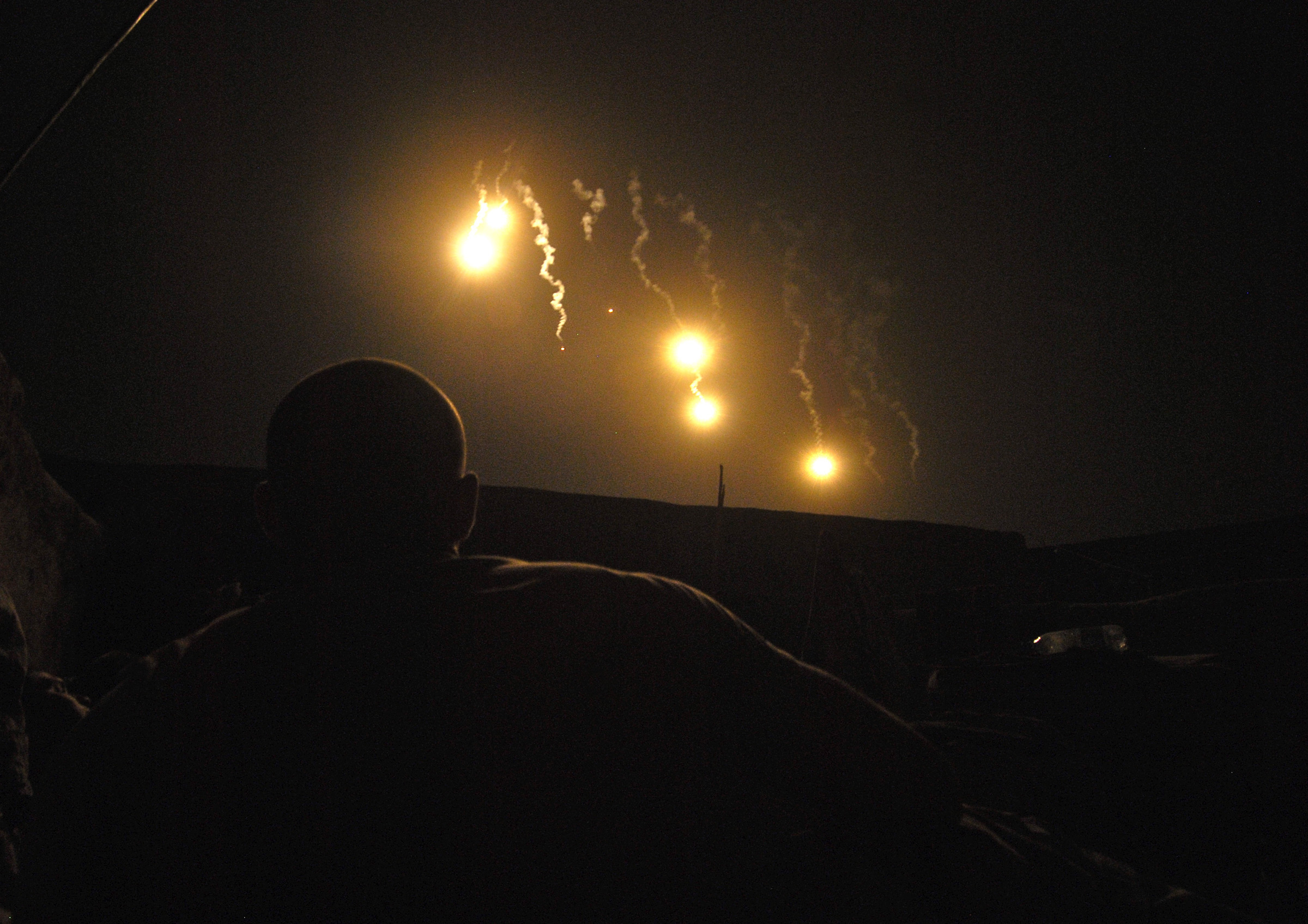
A star shell, also called an illumination round, is a slow descending flare fired into the air by artillery to illuminate a battlefield.

So as through a glass, and darkly
The age long strife I see
Where I fought in many guises,
Many names, but always me.

And I see not in my blindness
What the objects were I wrought,
But as God rules o’er our bickerings
It was through His will I fought.

So forever in the future,
Shall I battle as of yore,
Dying to be born a fighter,
But to die again, once more.

== Appearances ==
- In Patton (1970), the first and the third from last stanzas of "Through a Glass, Darkly" are recited by George C. Scott, amid a recount of the Siege of Carthage in the Third Punic War.

== See also ==
- Prioli, Carmine A. (1991). The Poems of General George S. Patton, Jr.: Lines of Fire. New York: Edwin Mellen Press. ISBN 978-0889461628.
