= Through a Glass Darkly (Koen novel) =

Book by Karleen Koen

- 1986 hardcover edition
- Author: Karleen Koen
- Language: English
- Genre: Historical fiction
- Publisher: Random House; Avon Books
- Publication date: 1986
- Publication place: United States
- Media type: Novel
- Pages: 738
- Followed by: Now Face to Face

Through a Glass Darkly is a 1986 historical fiction novel by American author Karleen Koen. A former magazine editor, Koen had never before written a novel and spent four years developing it while living as a housewife with her family. She sold the hardcover rights to Random House for $350,000, which was then a record for a new novelist. The circumstances behind the work's publication led to Koen becoming the subject of much media attention in the late 1980s.

Koen's story is set in the midst of the turbulent politics of the English and French aristocracy as well as the South Sea Bubble. The novel begins in 1715 England, when teenage protagonist Barbara Alderley becomes married to the handsome, older Earl Devane. Though in love with him, Barbara soon discovers a secret from his past that threatens to tear their relationship apart. Barbara must learn to navigate courtly intrigues and financial crises while experiencing personal tragedies.

Released on July 12, 1986, by Random House, Through a Glass Darkly landed on The New York Times Best Seller list. Critical reception was largely mixed, with reviewers focusing on the novel's prose and attention to historical detail. It has been translated into more than ten languages.

== Background ==
Through a Glass Darkly was the first novel written by American author Karleen Koen. She had previously been a reporter for the Houston Business Journal and also served as the editor of Houston Home & Garden before leaving to spend more time with her husband and two children. Desiring to once again have her name in print, Koen was persuaded by her husband to write a novel to help keep busy in between housework. At first sceptical at writing fiction, Koen began mentioning the idea at parties to avoid appearing as a mere housewife. "When you're at home raising children your status is – well, there is no status," Koen later recalled. Commencing the novel in 1980, she wrote three long drafts during a four-year period; the final manuscript ultimately contained 1,300 double-spaced pages.

Koen found inspiration from her interest in the eighteenth century. Rather than use the "virginity-sexual tango" trope of most historical romance novels, Koen sought to circumvent the "rules" of the genre and concentrate on characterization. Koen engaged in an intensive research period in the eighteenth century using approximately 300 books, which she often obtained from a local university's library. She also traveled briefly to England and France. Koen found writing the novel to be "a very intense thing" and became very attached to her characters, even the villains. She sought to "hook the readers emotionally and make them care. I guess it's a soap opera (but) there's a kind of sigh you heave when you finish a certain type of book. I wanted that sigh." She added:

"The heroine is Barbara, and she is 15 when the novel opens and 21 years old at the end. It's the story of her coming of age, her family, marriage and relationships. I left the exact place where all this happens rather nebulous, but the locale is southern England. It's all created. The period was fascinating to research – I went through about 300 books. It was the age of Defoe, Pope, Swift and Addison and I lost myself in their time."

To gain a publisher for her novel, she sent the manuscript to several literary agents she had discovered in Writer's Digest. Though two turned her down, one agent, Jean Naggar, encouraged Koen to continue finishing the book, believing it to be "the launching of a major author." Naggar mailed the manuscript to five major publishing companies, with Random House purchasing it for a "whopping" $350,000 in August 1985, which was at the time a record for a new novelist. Random House's publisher, Howard Kaminsky, wanted to publish "Oprah Winfrey-type books" in the "how-to-be-the-best-you-can-be" genre. He reasoned, "I'm sure that's up there with the highest prices ever paid for the hardcover rights alone to a first novel. But then it is not that big a price when you consider that it's such a deserving novel – and it will undoubtedly go for a very large amount in paperback later."

== Plot summary ==
In 1715 England, fifteen-year-old Barbara Alderley lives with her widowed grandmother, the Duchess of Tamworth, and her younger siblings on their family's country Tamworth estate. Barbara's indebted and calculating mother, Lady Diana Alderley, arrives to inform them of Barbara's possible marriage to Roger Montgeoffry, Earl Devane, a former aide to the deceased Duke. Barbara is pleased with the news, believing herself to be in love with the handsome, wealthy, and popular earl despite his age (nearly thirty years her senior).

Roger in turn desires Barbara's dowry of land in London, which he hopes to develop into an opulent estate and townhouses; she and her mother travel to London to make arrangements for the betrothal. Due to Diana's greed, negotiations almost fall apart until the intervention of the Duchess results in Barbara and Roger finally marrying. The couple travel to Paris. While learning to navigate through Parisian society, Barbara remains in love with her husband but Roger has no thoughts at all for his young bride other than mere fondness.

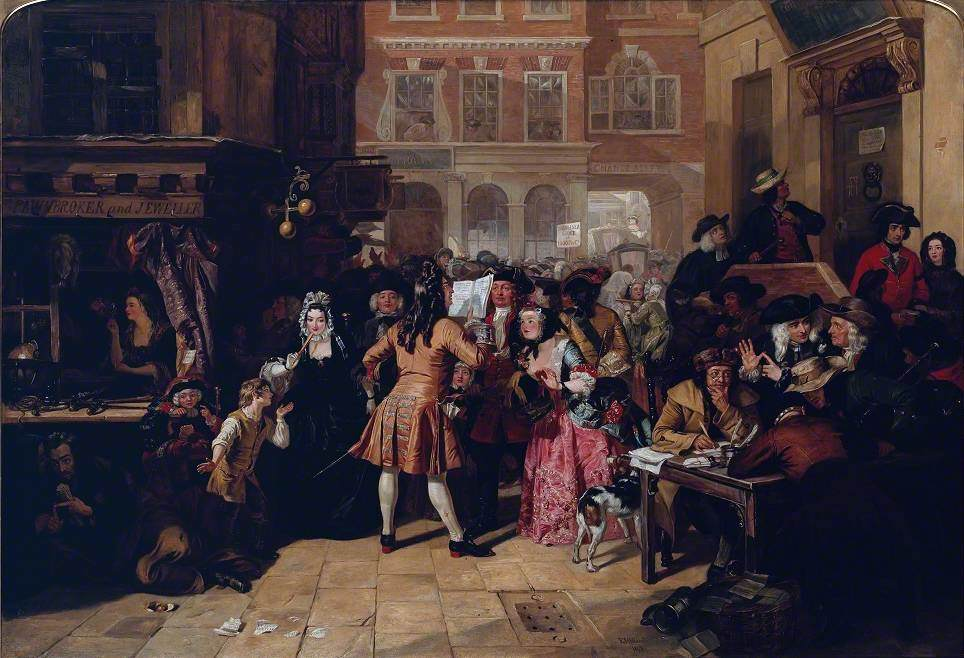
The South Sea Bubble by Edward Matthew Ward, 1847. A Hogarthian depiction of the South Sea Bubble

Roger however has a secret: he once had a long-term affair with the French aristocrat the Prince of Soissons, with whom he begins anew soon after arriving in Paris. Through the actions of courtiers jealous of Barbara's devotion to Roger, pamphlets eventually spread about the affair. The young and naive Barbara is among the last to hear of it and breaks down in tears and shock.

The plot jumps forward to 1720 England, where the country is unknowingly approaching the South Sea Bubble economic collapse; Barbara has separated from her husband and conducted affairs with several men in Paris and London. Still in love with Roger despite his affair, she is unhappy and becomes horrified when she discovers that one of her jealous lovers, Lord Charles Russel, killed Jemmy, a young nobleman who she accidentally slept with for one night.

Later, the bursting of the Bubble causes chaos and violence throughout London. Barbara's only surviving sibling, Harry, is in severe debt and commits suicide; many citizens blame Lord Devane, who helped run the South Sea Company, for the country's finances. At the Tamworth estate, Barbara and Roger attempt a reconciliation but he collapses from an apoplexy soon after while evaluating his own precarious financial situation in London.

With the help of several of Roger's friends, Barbara attempts to oversee his finances and takes him out of the still-chaotic city. At Tamworth, Roger gradually becomes worse and dies. Stricken and in mourning, Barbara holds a public memorial in London for her deceased husband, despite being warned that it would draw attention to his estate during the Parliamentary inquest into the financial crisis. To give her peace, the Duchess develops a scheme of spiriting her granddaughter out of the country by having her visit their plantation in Virginia. The novel ends with Barbara and several servants leaving on a ship intended for the colonies.

=== Main characters ===
- Barbara Alderley, Lady Devane – young, naive, devoted, and beautiful, she is the protagonist of the novel and Roger's wife
- Roger Montgeoffry, Earl Devane – wealthy, charismatic, handsome, and popular, he is Barbara's husband and Philippe's lover
- Alice Saylor, Duchess of Tamsworth – the venerable dowager of the Saylor family, she is Diana's mother and Barbara's grandmother
- Tony Saylor, Duke of Tamworth – young, shy, and kind, he is in love with his cousin Barbara
- Lady Diana Alderley – calculating, cold, promiscuous, and greedy, she is mother to Barbara and Harry
- Philippe, Prince of Soissons – a sophisticated and dangerous French aristocrat, he is Roger's lover
- Harry Alderley – impetuous and handsome, he is Barbara's brother
- Jane Ashford, later Cromwell – kind and serious, she is a childhood friend of Barbara's and Harry's early love

== Themes ==
For now we see through a glass, darkly, but then face to face;
now I know in part; but then shall I know even as also I am known

— 1 Corinthians 13, King James version

Through a Glass Darkly is a long, complex narrative that features more than 60 characters and at least 15 subplots. The title of the novel comes from the Bible verse 1 Corinthians 13. Before she began writing it, Koen envisioned creating a story about the relationship between a young woman and an older man, a plot element riddled with emotional tension that required much planning and foresight. Koen also sought to create a story that featured issues relevant to contemporary women, such as the non-existence of "legal rights. If a husband wanted to beat his wife to death he could do it, and if her parents didn't care... No birth control. If you had any normal sexual urges you were pregnant all the time, and half the women died in childbirth. Life was very violent and short and I just wanted to show how it was without getting up on a soapbox, so someone reading it would say, 'I'm glad I live now.'" According to Koen, another consistent theme throughout Through a Glass Darkly is how vital family is to our well-being, family in this case being a loose term that does not necessarily equate to being biologically related. She was also interested in writing how people are connected to each other.

== Release and reception ==
Through a Glass Darkly was first released in hardcover on July 12, 1986. Koen became known as the "unknown author who hit the jackpot" of a book that "everyone's been talking about." Media stories angled the book's backstory as a "phenomenon," particularly because it was purchased by a prestigious publisher at such a high price for a first time novelist. After its release, Koen began a seven-city promotional tour that ended in late September 1986. Avon Books paid more than twice Random House's price to gain paperback rights, and released the novel on paperback on September 1, 1987. Even before it was officially published, Through a Glass Darkly landed on The New York Times Best Seller list, where it stayed for more than a year. It was translated into ten languages the year it was published. In February 1987, People reported that "plans to turn the book into a big-budget miniseries are also underway."

=== Critical reception ===
After reviewing the hype surrounding the book, author Barbara Schaaf concluded that its prose "was first-rate – literate and with flashes of timeless insight. Anyone who can take a 15-year-old heroine... and dash off over 700 pages just to get her to age 21 without losing the reader, has real talent." Schaaf added that Koen has a "fine eye for art, architecture, fashion, manners and relays the everything," though she critiqued the author for sometimes inserting too many historical details. She believed that the book especially shone in depicting the South Sea Bubble; "most historical writers," Schaaf opined, "neglect the economic background of their periods, regardless of its importance, and [Koen's] grasp of a complicated situation makes it as fascinating as her descriptions of the sexual behavior of the upper and lower classes."

People's Harriet Shapiro declared that Through a Glass Darkly "is no run-of-the-mill bodice buster, trade slang for bosom-heaving historical romances. Koen paints a lavish, carefully researched portrait of a young woman's turbulent coming of age in 18th-century England and France." Texas Monthly asserted that characterization was Koen's greatest asset, though the story's "sense of pacing falters" after two hundred pages. Another criticism was directed at the numerous monologues, which felt like having "commercials stacked toward the end of a late-night TV movie." Texas Monthly ended their review on a positive note, giving praise to the historical detail as well as the story's ending, which the reviewer believed would encourage readers to buy the forthcoming sequel.

In a guest column for The New York Times, author Erica Jong called Koen's work a "well-researched, workmanlike historical novel [...] of the sort that Kathleen Winsor or Thomas B. Costain used to write: packed with details of costume, architecture and cuisine, populated by rudimentary paper-doll characters, full of undigested Continued on next page gobbets of research." Jong shone a negative light on some of the characters, which she believed "seem[ed] derived from movies, mini-series and other books" and overshadowed by the attention to historical detail. She concluded that "Koen's publishers [did] her a disservice in presenting this rather routine and turgid book as though it were Gone With the Wind," when it was actually a "well-researched bodice-ripper."

Phoebe-Lou Adams of The Atlantic gave a negative review and criticized the "enormous, gigantic, monstrous historical novel" for containing a protagonist who "suffers and suffers and suffers while innumerable soap-opera types minuet about in fancy dress. The period is early eighteenth century, and the research underlying the gallimaufry is thorough beyond the call of duty." In response to some bad attention her novel received, which she said "hurt like hell," Koen noted the persistence of "in-fighting" within the publishing industry. "Who reviews your book has a lot to do with the kind of review you get," she said.

== See also ==
- List of romantic novelists
