= Demetrius Ducas =

Greek scholar and educator (c. 1480–c. 1527)

- Δημήτριος Δουκᾶς
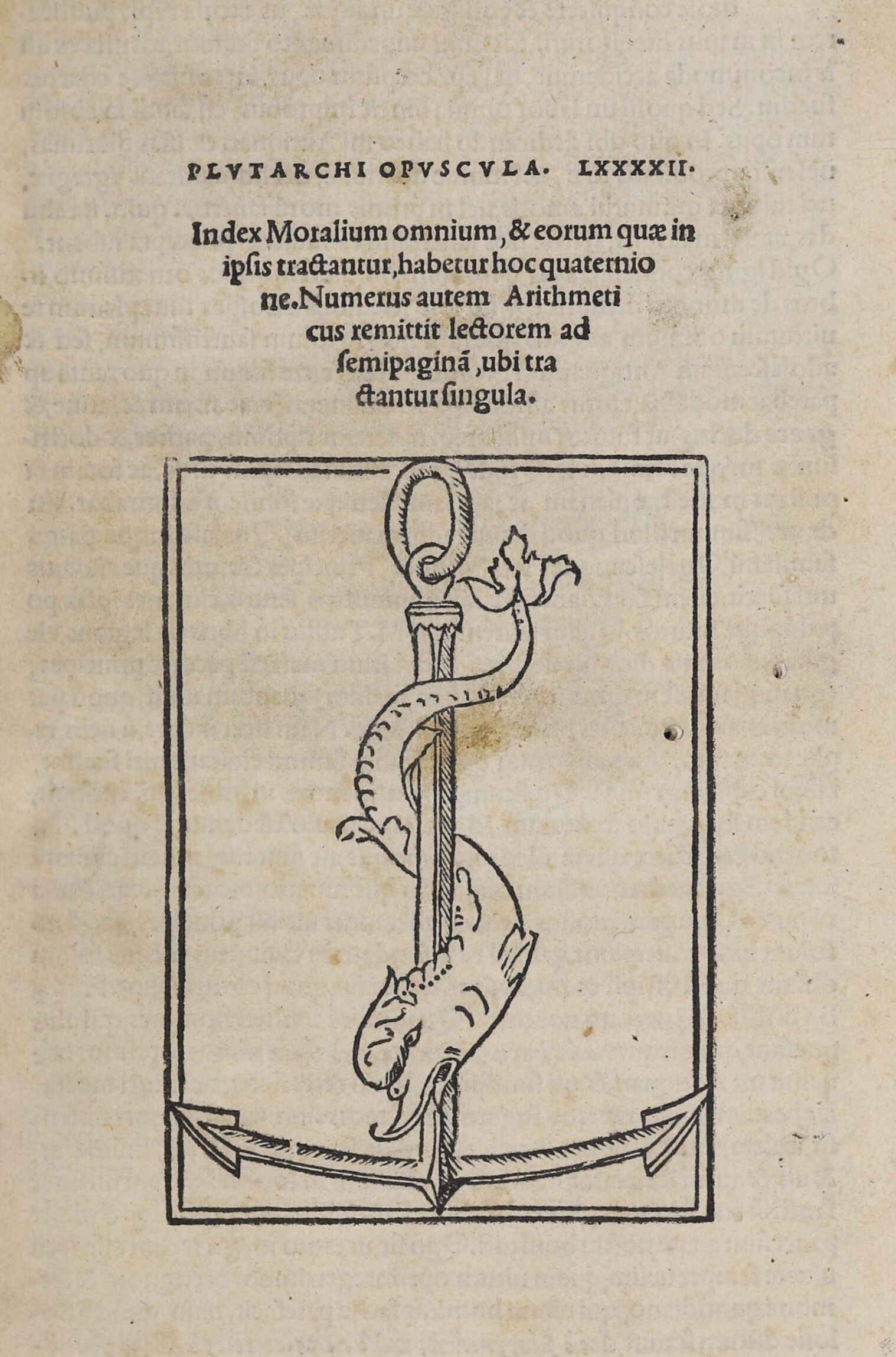
- Title page of the Aldine edition of Plutarch's Moralia, edited by Ducas in 1509
- Born: c. 1480; Candia, Venetian Crete
- Died: c. 1527; Possibly Rome, Papal States

Academic work
- Discipline: Classics
- Notable students: Hernán Núñez; Diego Sigeo; Lorenzo Balbo; Francisco de Vergara
- Notable works: First edition of Aristotle's Rhetoric and Poetics (1508); First edition of Plutarch's Moralia (1509); Edition of the Greek New Testament in the Complutensian Polyglot Bible (1514)

Demetrius Ducas (Greek: Δημήτριος Δουκᾶς, romanized: Dēmḗtrios Doukâs, (Note: This Byzantine surname's usual form is Δούκας, Doúkas. Though this spelling appears in an early notarial document, Ducas used Δουκᾶς, Doukâs, throughout his adult life. Modern bibliographers have used both forms to refer to Ducas.) Latin: Demetrius Ducas; c. 1480 – c. 1527) was a Cretan Greek humanist educator and classical scholar. Raised in Candia (modern Heraklion), he moved to Venice around 1508, where he edited Greek texts for the press of Aldus Manutius. He again moved to Spain around 1513, at the invitation of Francisco Jiménez de Cisneros, teaching Greek at Alcalá and collaborating on the Complutensian Polyglot Bible. He left Spain in 1519, being succeeded as chair of Greek by his student Hernán Núñez, to teach in Rome under Popes Leo X and Clement VII. Traces of his activity cease in 1527, when he is presumed to have died, possibly during the 1527 Sack of Rome.

Long overlooked due to a dearth of biographical information, Ducas is now regarded as a pioneering figure in the dissemination of Greek letters to Spain during the Renaissance, having instructed many noted Spanish Hellenists of the 16th century. Further, though not as prolific an editor as his colleagues Marcus Musurus and Janus Lascaris, he is recognised for his contributions to the printing of the Greek classics in the Aldine press.

== Life and career ==
=== Early life and activity in Venice ===
Little is known of Ducas's early life in Crete. He was most likely born in Candia (modern Heraklion), and is known to have attained majority by November 1500. A passage in the Greek preface to the Complutensian New Testament (unsigned but likely composed by Ducas) suggests he may have travelled to Constantinople in his youth; visits to the city by Greek scholars were not uncommon. He is next found in the court of Alberto III Pio; Alberto's correspondence mentions Ducas's presence in Carpi in March 1505.

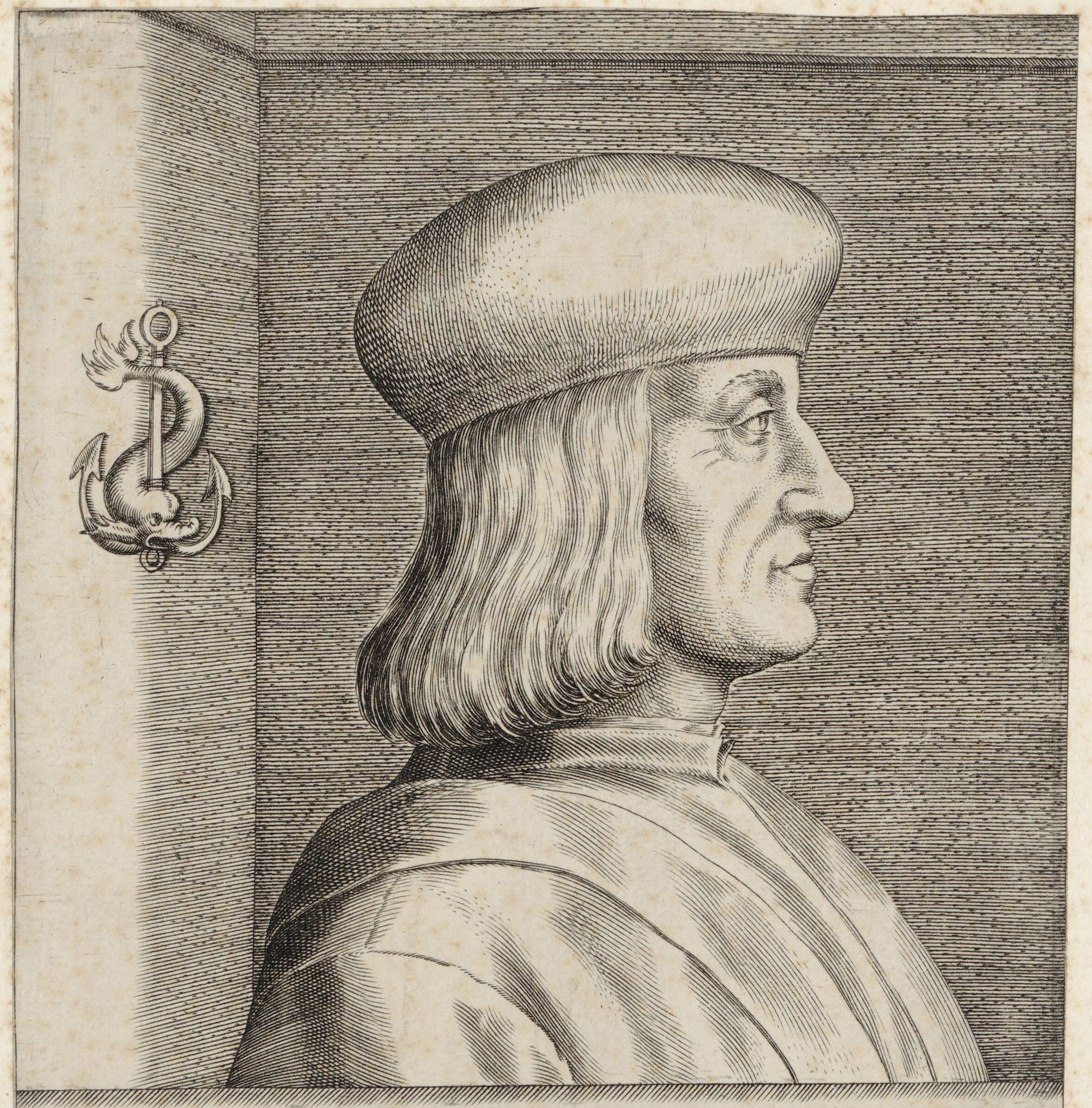
Aldus Manutius, Ducas's main associate and employer in Venice

By 1508 Ducas had moved to Venice, where he associated with Aldus Manutius and his circle, becoming a member of the Aldine Academy (Note: Ducas's participation in the Academy is widely assumed, but there is no positive evidence, and the assumption has been questioned.) and contributing to the publication of classical Greek texts. Ducas specifically appears to have been the principal editor of the two-volume Aldine Rhetores graeci, (Note: Attribution is complicated by the absence of express credit for Aldine editors. Ducas's prefatory letter to Marcus Musurus confirms that he collaborated with Aldus in the correction of at least one included work.) a collection of critical works on rhetoric including the editio princeps (first printed edition) of Aristotle's Rhetoric and Poetics. The first volume was published in November 1508, the second following in May 1509.

Continuing his activity at the Aldine press, he produced the editio princeps of Plutarch's Moralia in March 1509; he was assisted in the collation of manuscripts for the edition by Girolamo Aleandro and Erasmus. The Aldine Moralia drew a mixed response: contemporary critics (including Richard Croke and Joachim Camerarius) noted the number of misprints, and focused on Ducas's perceived failure to detect and emend corrupt passages, which produced difficulties for readers in understanding Plutarch's Greek. Nigel Wilson notes that Ducas openly acknowledged the edition's shortcomings in his preface, and that the resources then available to Aldus precluded a more comprehensive critical treatment of the text.

After the 1509 publication of the Moralia, Ducas becomes difficult to trace until 1513. Biographers associate his lack of output with Venetian involvement in the War of the League of Cambrai, which upset intellectual life and momentarily halted Aldus's editorial plans. Teresa Martínez Manzano further suggests that Ducas departed Venice and spent time in Rome before his eventual relocation to Spain.

=== Professorship in Alcalá ===
Cardinal Francisco Jiménez de Cisneros, a major representative of Spain's growing humanist movement, invited Ducas to a professorship in Alcalá. Ducas accepted and is known to have been teaching Greek in Alcalá by 1513, (Note: This is when definite evidence of his activity emerges: Jerry H. Bentley argues he would've "arrived in Spain well before 1513".) though little was recorded of his instruction. His students during this period include Hernán Núñez, Diego Sigeo, Lorenzo Balbo and Francisco de Vergara. Greek studies in Spain were still nascent relative to Italy, and in fact no Greek books had been printed there by the time of Ducas's arrival. Taking notice of this, he published two volumes at his own expense in 1514: a collection of grammatical treatises, and Musaeus' epyllion Hero and Leander (then popular as an introductory Greek reader). Both books served in Ducas's teaching of elementary Greek, and utilised the Greek typeface designed for the Complutensian Polyglot Bible.

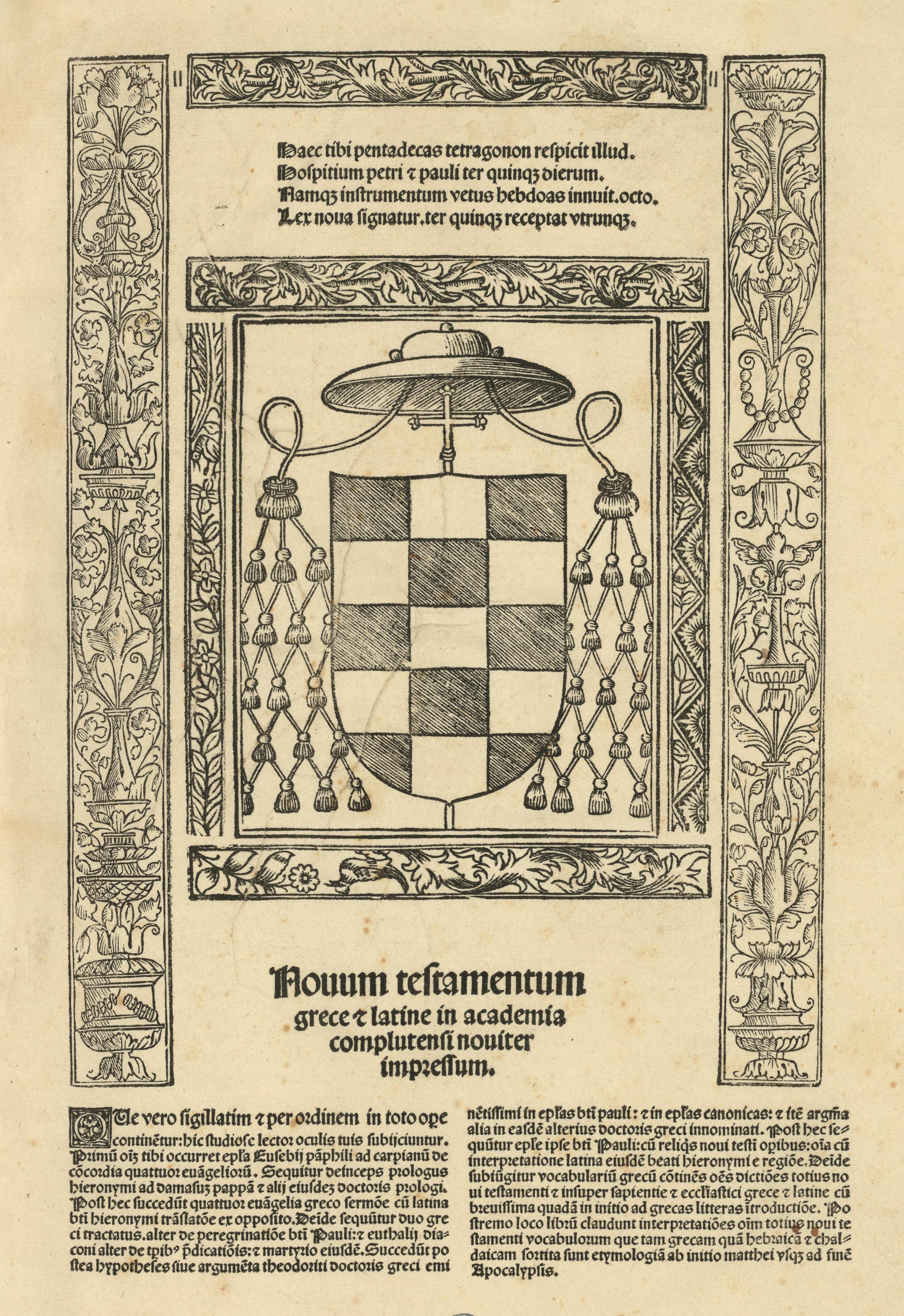
Title page of the Complutensian New Testament (completed 1514), edited by a committee including Ducas

==== Work on the Complutensian Polyglot ====
Parallel to his teaching at Alcalá, Ducas was engaged in work on the New Testament volume of the Cisneros-funded Complutensian Polyglot Bible, in collaboration with Núñez, Juan de Vergara, Bartolomé de Castro and later Vettor Fausto. Although the distribution of editorial duties between the five men was not recorded, it is generally agreed that Ducas was the chief editor of the volume's Greek content, as well as the author of its Greek preface. In the reasoning of Deno Geanakoplos:

The author [of the preface] refers with a certain familiarity to "some ancient inscriptions on stone in Constantinople." Of the four men that we know were associated with Ducas in the New Testament enterprise, none, except for Ducas himself, seems ever to have set foot in the Greek East. Now if [...] we add the fact that the language employed seems to be that of one intimate with the nuances of Greek style, and, finally, the very striking circumstance that the dedicatory poems of Ducas and Fausto are alone written in Greek [...], it would seem justifiable to affirm that Ducas was not only the author of this preface but primarily responsible for editing the Greek text of the New Testament volume.

The New Testament volume was printed in January 1514; it was numbered fifth, but was the first volume of the project to reach completion. It employed a novel, simplified system of Greek accentuation, most likely developed by Ducas. (Note: Specifically, all breathing marks are eliminated, as are the grave and circumflex accents (the acute taking their place). Monosyllabic words are unaccented, except in some cases of emphatic stress. Enclitics are treated as regular words. Núñez has alternatively been put forward as the system's creator.) Though founded on contemporary conceptions of accentuation in antiquity, the system inadvertently anticipated some later developments of Modern Greek orthography.

Ducas also contributed to the editing of the Old Testament volumes. However, evidence for their division of labour is even scanter, and considerable doubt remains over the nature and extent of his involvement. According to an early conjecture by Karl Josef von Hefele, he worked on the interlinear Latin translation of the Septuagint; Marcel Bataillon instead argues that he edited the Septuagint's Greek text itself. Séamus O'Connell proposes a conjectural scheme for the third Old Testament volume, with Ducas responsible for editing the books of Tobit, Judith and Sirach, and Núñez taking on books with more complex textual histories.

Ducas's last known payment for teaching at Alcalá—for the period of May to October 1517—was received in May 1518, and Núñez succeeded him as the Greek chair in May 1519; he appears to have left Spain between those dates.

=== Later years in Rome ===
==== Partnership with Francesco Griffo ====
Following his departure from Spain, Ducas settled in Rome; he may have come to the city at the invitation of Pope Leo X, similar to other former associates of Aldus (who had died in 1515), including Marcus Musurus and Janus Lascaris. There, he partnered with Aldus's former punchcutter Francesco Griffo (Note: Griffo was assumed to have died around 1519, until documents mentioning activity down to 1523 were highlighted in 2016.) to establish a small printing workshop. The pair printed editions of the Progymnasmata of Theon and Libanius by Angelo Barbato in 1520, before independently editing Chrysoloras' Erotemata, as well as a miscellany of classical Greek prose in 1522. (Note: No complete copy of the 95-page miscellany has been found. It included selections from Demosthenes, Lysias, Isocrates and Plutarch, of which only the Plutarch section survives.) Ducas and Griffo were still operating in April 1523, when they became involved in a legal dispute against Barbato.

==== Professorship and final projects ====
Ducas next published the editio princeps of the liturgies of John Chrysostom, Basil the Great and the Liturgy of the Presanctified Gifts in October 1526. He was now working alone, taking charge of both the editing and printing. An edition of Alexander of Aphrodisias' commentary on Aristotle's Metaphysics (in the Latin translation of Juan Sepúlveda) followed in February 1527. Both volumes bore papal licenses issued by Pope Clement VII; these refer to Ducas as a "public professor of Greek letters" (Graecarum litterarum [...] publicus professor); he is similarly called a professor in documents relating to his 1523 dispute with Barbato. Ducas is surmised to have taught in the University of Rome, though no further details of his employment there survive, as records of the university's appointments are only preserved from 1539 onwards.

The papal license for the 1527 volume is the last document to mention Ducas; after it he disappears completely from the historical record. He may have been killed, like many of the city's scholars, during the 1527 Sack of Rome.

== Legacy ==
References to Ducas until the 19th century are relatively sparse, and systematic study of his intellectual legacy was delayed by a series of mistaken identifications. Constantine Sathas composed a brief biographical sketch of Ducas for his 1868 Neohellenic Philology; this early attempt featured several inaccuracies, such as that Ducas had "edited the Ten Orators" (Note: Evidently a confusion prompted by Ducas's editing of the Aldine Rhetores graeci.) and that he "most likely died in Madrid." He is only named in passing in John Edwin Sandys' 1903–1908 History of Classical Scholarship, with little reference to his activity. A number of documents relating to Ducas's life, including his prefaces to his Aldine publications, were reprinted by Émile Legrand in 1885.

The first complete biography of Ducas was published by Deno Geanakoplos in 1962; Geanakoplos highlighted his activity in the Aldine press and especially his position as an early pioneer of Greek studies in Spain. A 2025 biographical treatment by Teresa Martínez Manzano identified further evidence for his life and career (including several overlooked editions), and placed renewed emphasis on his activity in Rome and association with the Medici popes. Ducas's contributions to the Complutensian Polyglot Bible also continue to be a focus of research on his person.

=== Depictions in fiction ===
Charles Mills' fictional travelogue The Travels of Theodore Ducas of Candia in Various Countries in Europe at the Revival of Letters and Art (1822) is written in the person of Theodore Ducas, a fictional son of Demetrius.

== See also ==
- Greek scholars in the Renaissance
