= Legacy and evaluations of Erasmus =

Impact and appraisal of Dutch humanist

Erasmus of Rotterdam is commonly regarded as the key public intellectual of the early decades of the 16th century. He has been given the sobriquet "Prince of the Humanists", and has been called "the crowning glory of the Christian humanists". He has also been called "the most illustrious rhetorician and educationalist of the Renaissance".

His reputation and the interpretations of his work have varied over time and by community. Many Catholics now recognize him as a sardonic but loyal reformer within the Church with an evangelical and pastoral spirituality that emphasized peace and mercy, while many Protestants approve of his initial support for (and, in part, inspiration of) Luther's initial ideas and the groundwork he laid for the future Reformation, especially in biblical scholarship.

However, at times he has been viciously criticized from all sides, his works suppressed, his expertise corralled, his writings misinterpreted, his thought demonized, and his legacy marginalized. Common characterizations are that, despite his lauded progressiveness, he could or should have gone further, or that, despite his claimed conservatism, he rashly went too far.

== Overview ==
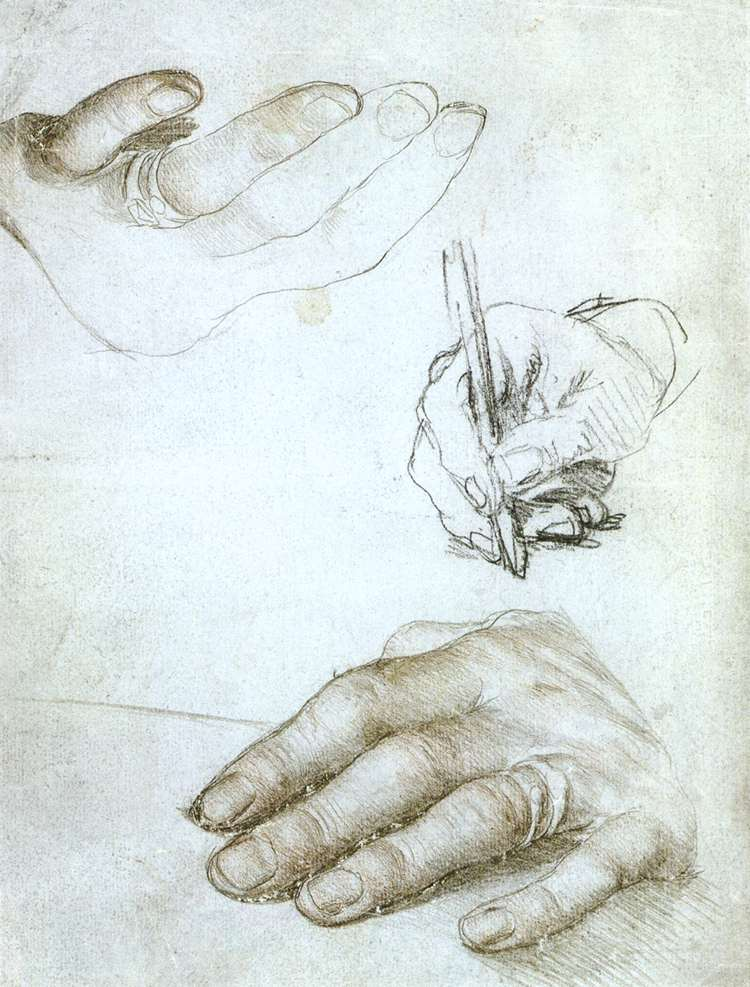
Holbein's studies of Erasmus's hands, in silverpoint and chalks, c. 1523 (Louvre)

Since the origin of Christianity there have been perhaps only two other men—St Augustine and Voltaire—whose influence can be paralleled with Erasmus.

— W.S. Lily, Renaissance Types

Historian Lewis Spitz identifies four views of Erasmus' character and project:

- "a man of weak character whose timidity and weak will kept him from the consequences of his own premises;"
- "a devotee of reason who followed this natural light through storm and stress to the very end;"
- "as the forerunner of Luther, the John the Baptist of the evangelical revival;" or
- "a man with his own positive reform program, in part critical, for the most part constructive."

No man before or since acquired such undisputed sovereignty in the republic of letters[...] The reform which he set in motion went beyond him, and left him behind. In some of his opinions, however, he was ahead of his age, and anticipated a more modern stage of Protestantism. He was as much a forerunner of Rationalism as of the Reformation.

— 71. Erasmus, History of the Christian Church, vol 7, Philip Schaff

French biographer Désiré Nisard characterized him as a lens or focal point: "the whole of the Renaissance in Western Europe in the sixteenth century converged towards him." (Note: A comment mirrored by historian Fr James Kelsey McConica: "Erasmus commanded the allegiance of the best minds of his day for a reason. It as his genius to fuse into a single stream of thought the converging currents of the late fifteenth century: humanistic textual scholarship, Florentine neo-Platonism, Netherlands piety of the devotio moderna and the Windesheim reform movement, and the manifold discontents of a middle class suddenly aware of its power and needs.") However, according to historian Erika Rummel, "Erasmus' role in the dissemination of ideas is therefore less that of a forerunner of the Reformation than that of a synthesizer of many of the currents of thought that fed into the Reformation."

A reviewer P.S.A. in 1910 wrote "the common estimate of Erasmus[...]is still tinged by the venom vomited forth on him from both sides by combatants whom he would not join."

== Erasmianism ==
(By the 1570s) "everyone had assimilated Erasmus to one extent or another."

— Christopher Ocker

Erasmians: Erasmus frequently mentioned that he did not want office nor to be the founder or figurehead of a sect or movement, despite his vigorous branding and self-promotion. Nevertheless, historians do identify de facto "Erasmians" (ranging from the early Jesuits (Note: The Jesuits have been described as intermediaries for the ideas of Erasmus in the Counter-Reformation, such as in Ignatius' Spiritual Exercises.) to the early reformers, and each Thomas More, William Tyndale and Henry VIII (Note: Historian Hugh Trevor-Roper is quoted "I have always taught my students that Henry VIII was an intellectually an erasmian and that his practical aim was to reform the church in that sense; and that he planned to abolish monasteries[..] to strengthen the episcopal (i.e. working) church at the expense of the parasitic monastic establishment.))—Christian humanists who picked up on some or other aspects of Erasmus' agenda. (Note: "Describing Tyndale merely as an Erasmian, however, is not particularly helpful" as, theologically, he followed Luther.)

Erasmianism: This has been described as a "more intellectual form of spiritualized Christianity" that is "an undercurrent of religious thought between Catholicism and Lutheranism." It had a notable influence in Spain and England. However, a precise definition is not possible; (Note: "As Erasmus himself has taken on more substance, achieved a firmer outline, the notion ("Erasmianism") has become more wraithlike or, at least, more problematic and lacking in definition.") it is not, for example, a set of precise, systematic doctrinal propositions. (Note: Historian Gregory Dodds notes "there simply were no 'Erasmians', nor even a consistent series of theological ideas that were clearly 'Erasmian.'[...]Erasmianism should be viewed as a rhetorical style and a generalized worldview that focused on peace and unity as the definitive dogmas of true religion. For Puritans, as for many others, peace and unity sometimes had to be sacrificed for the sake of truth, but for those of an Erasmian frame of mind peace was itself a core doctrine.") As with many eponymous movements, back-fitting the ideas of the movement onto the nominal originator may misrepresent them both.

The near election of Reginald Pole as pope in 1546 has been attributed to Erasmianism in the electors.

French historian Jean-Claude Margolin has noted an Erasmian stream in French culture putting "the concrete before the abstract and the ethical before the speculative", though not without noting that it is not clear whether Erasmus influenced the French or vice versa.

Historian W. R. Ward notes that "the direst enemies of theosophy were always Erasmian Catholics and Calvinist Protestants who were trying to get the magic out of Christianity."

Erasmian Reformation: Some historians such as Edward Gibbon and Hugh Trevor-Roper have even claimed an "'Erasmianism after Erasmus,' a secret stream which meandered to and fro across the Catholic/Protestant divide, creating oases of rational thought impartially on either side." For some, this amounted to a third church: or even that "Luther's and Calvin's Reformations were minor affairs" compared to the Reformation of Erasmus and the humanists' which swept away the Middle Ages.

Erasmian liberalism: This has had an enduring run: described by philosopher Edwin Curley that "the spirit of Erasmian liberalism was to emphasize the ethical aspects of Christianity at the expense of the doctrinal, to suspend judgment on many theological issues, and to insist that the faith actually required for salvation was a simple and uncontroversial one."

Erasmus has frequently been described as "proto-liberal" (both, e.g., in the UK "Lloyd George" sense of liberalism as a form of conservatism that wants moderate but real reform to prevent immoderate and destructive revolution, or the ethical sense of socio-economic Socinianism)

Protestant historian Roland Bainton is quoted "no-one did more than Erasmus to break down the theory and practice of the medieval variety of intolerance." Other popular or scholarly writers have suggested that Erasmus' tolerant but idealistic agenda failed, certainly at the political level, evidenced by the wars and persecutions of the Protestant Reformation.

== Educationalist ==
Erasmus has been variously called an "educator of educators", a "teacher of teachers" and a "professor of professors", but also a "pastor of pastors."

'Erasmus is the greatest man we come across in the history of education!' (R.R. Bolger) … with greater confidence it can be claimed that Erasmus is the greatest man we come across in the history of education in the sixteenth century. …It may also be claimed that Erasmus was one of the most important champions of women's rights in his century.

— J.K. Sowards (Note: English professor Craig R. Thompson took a view close to Bolger's: "If by education is meant liberal-arts education as known in the West during the past five centuries, a training whose basis was grammatical, rhetorical and literary, the primacy of Erasmus can be accepted without demur.")

Erasmus was notable for his textbooks, his sense of learning as play, his emphasis on speech skills and promoting early classical-language acquisition, in the service of his cultural/pastoral/political agenda.

According to scholar Gerald J. Luhrman, "the system of secondary education, as developed in a number of European countries, is inconceivable without the efforts of humanist educationalists, particularly Erasmus. His ideas in the field of language acquisition were systematized and realized to a large extent in the schools founded by the Jesuits..." (Note: 20th Century historian John C. Olin recounts that his Latin and Greek education at a Jesuit school in Buffalo, NY "followed substantially the Messina program" set up in 1548 in Sicily by Canesius, et al., which used Erasmus' non-theological works, such as De copia, his letter-writing guide De conscribendis epistolis, and his Latin syntax De constructione.) Historian Brian Cummings wrote "for a hundred years Erasmus commanded the curriculum." In the 1540s, Ursulines founded schools in Rezatto, Brescia, "inspired by Erasmus's pedagogical programme..." (Note: ..."and by Girolamo Miani's work with children.")

His system of pronouncing ancient Greek was adopted for teaching in the major Western European nations.

In England, he wrote the first curriculum for St Paul's School and his Latin grammar (written with Lily and Colet) "continued to be used, in adapted form, into the Twentieth Century." Erasmus' curriculum, grammar, pronunciation and de Copia were adopted by the other major grammar schools: Eton, Westminster, Winchester, Canterbury, etc. and the universities

Erasmus "tried to realize a practical goal: a modern education as preparation for administrators from the higher estates." Sovereigns ultimately determined wars personally; so the education of princes was vital for future peace: their old curricula encouraged vainglorious militarism and needed to be replaced by ones which encouraged beneficial governing, by promoting knowledge and piety. Teenaged Prince Henry, later Henry VIII, was the first European prince to be given an Erasmian education.

Erasmus was also a key part of the humanist program to get Greek and Hebrew taught at the major Universities, inspired by Cardinal Cisneros' Trilingual College of San Ildefonso/Alcalá (1499/1509) and Bishop John Fisher's establishment of Greek and Hebrew lectures at Cambridge: the Trilingual Colleges at Louvain (1517) and Paris (1530) (where students included Loyola and Calvin) spawned programs in Zurich, Rome, Strasbourg and Oxford (c.1566). He has been described as "an unsuspected superspreader of New Ancient Greek." (Note: The seven Greek "short pieces by Erasmus may have made a big difference, contributing to bringing about a tipping point in humanist linguistic culture.")

Historian and Germanist Fritz Caspari saw education as the core of Erasmus' program:

"Erasmus hoped that the education of all individuals, especially of princes and nobles, in the spirit and disciplines of antiquity and Christianity would bring the rational element in them to full fruition. Ratio, reason, was in his mind almost synonymous with "goodness" and "kindness." The rule of reason, achieved through education, would therefore result in men's living together in universal peace and harmony in accord with the lessons of Christ's Sermon on the Mount."

— Fritz Caspari (1941)

== Writer ==
The popularity of his books is reflected in the number of editions and translations that have appeared since the sixteenth century. Ten columns of the catalogue of the British Library are taken up with the enumeration of the works and their subsequent reprints. The greatest names of the classical and patristic world are among those translated, edited, or annotated by Erasmus, including Ambrose, Aristotle, Augustine, Basil, John Chrysostom, Cicero and Jerome.

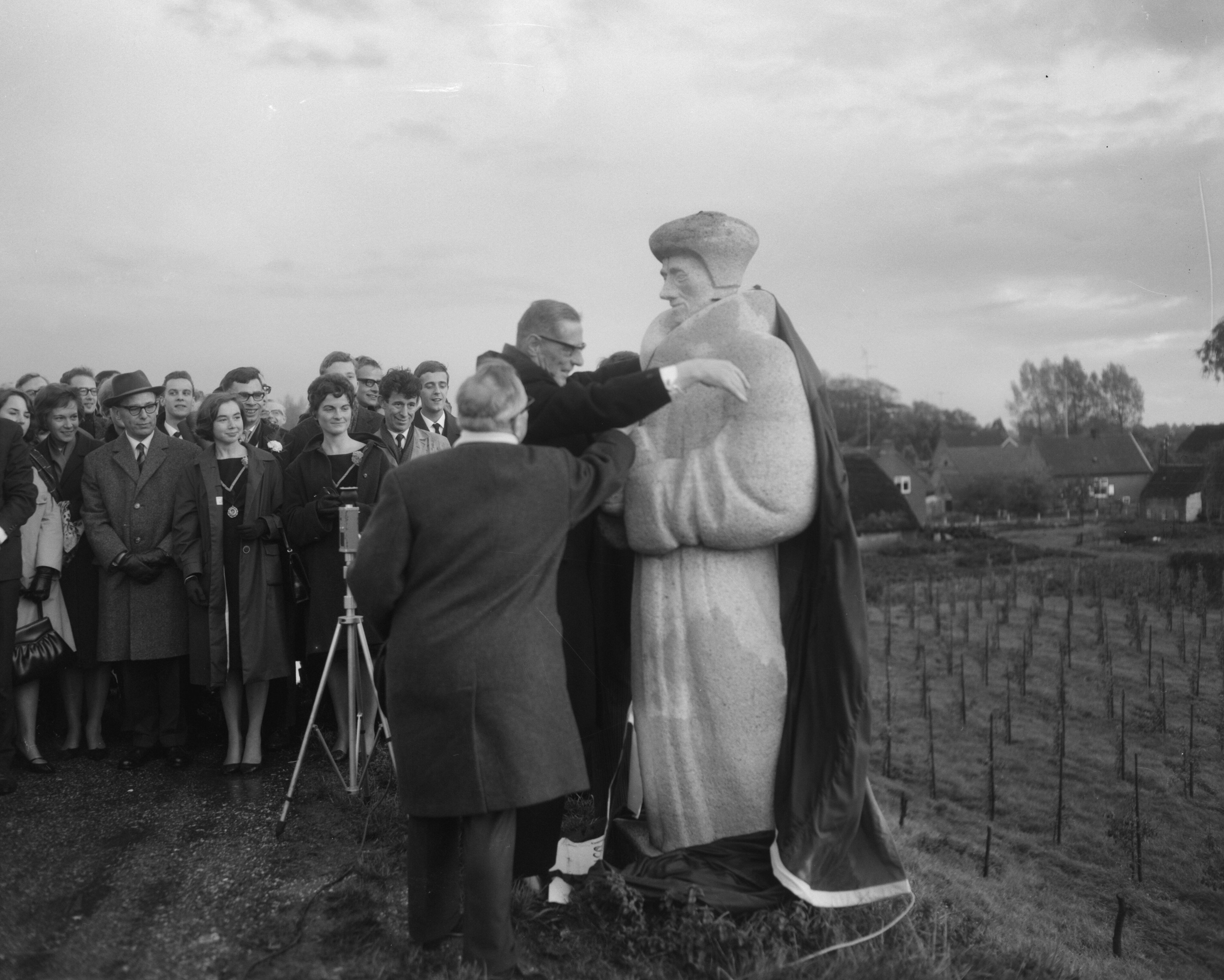
Unveiling of a Dutch statue of Erasmus (1964) in Nijmegen

== Controversy on antisemitism ==
Erasmus, as with many humanists, prized friendship as an institution that could override prejudice such as xenophobia: "For I am of such a nature that I could love even a Jew, were he a pleasant companion and did not spew out blasphemy against Christ" however Erasmus scholar Shimon Markish suggests that it is probable Erasmus never actually encountered a (practising) Jew. (Note: However, Erasmus related that he had consulted a Jewish doctor in October 1518. Erasmus also knew several converted Jews: his doctor, Matthais Adrianus, who Erasmus recommended for the Trilingual College, and his doctor Paolo Riccio, a professor of philosophy and imperial physician. Erasmus's Spanish friend Juan Luis Vives came from a converso family: indeed, his father had been executed as a Judaizer heretic. Erasmus' friendly correspondents Juan de Vergara and Francisco de Vergara similarly came from a converso family on their mother's side.)

Markish wrote that the charge of antisemitism could not be sustained in Erasmus' public writings. Erasmus was (theologically) anti-Judaic but not racially antisemitic in the vehement way of the later post-Catholic Martin Luther: it was not a topic or theme of any book. Erasmus made no explicit call for the expulsion of non-converting Jews: though he allowed it as a national policy, he noted that such a policy may be counter-productive.

Challenging this, Erasmus scholar Nathan Ron wrote that Erasmus denigrated Jews by his translation and publication of the complete works of John Chrysostom which included John's notorious sermons Adversus Judaeos (written against efforts in the local synagogue to re-convert Christians) —which go further than deprecating re-judaizing tendencies within Christianity but set the pattern for later Christian antisemitism by portraying Jews as collectively the murderers of Christ— and by several miscellaneous comments by Erasmus. For Ron, "His role was obviously not on the same scale as Martin Luther's. Nonetheless, both in style and content, Erasmus's role in the long history of anti-Jewish and/or anti-Judaism attitudes should not be overlooked or underestimated."

Biographer James Tracy points to the antisemitic edge in Erasmus' uncharacteristically vituperative comments against Johannes Pfefferkorn during the Reuchlin affair: Erasmus felt Pfefferkorn had personally attacked him. (Note: Erasmus wrote of Pferfferkorn that "a wicked (Latin: scelerato) Jew had become a most wicked (Latin: sceleratissimum) Christian." In the case of the Reuchlin affair, Erasmus sided with Reuchlin, a gentile who advocated Hebrew studies (which Erasmus never seriously undertook himself, but promoted) and interaction with Jewish scholars (which Erasmus never felt the professional occasion for) to learn of things such as the kaballa (which Erasmus scorned), against the attacks of Johannes Pfefferkorn, a converted Jew (which Erasmus approved of when sincere) who saw dangers in any re-Judaizing or re-mosaicing Christianity (like Erasmus) but who went into fanaticism (which Erasmus abhored), e.g., advocating that Jews be compelled to hear Christian sermons, and that all copies of the Talmud be destroyed; both Reuchlin and Pfefferkorn called out the blood libel.) Erasmus reacted sharply against any serious accusations made against him: his contention with his former bedmate at Aldus turned foe, Girolamo Aleandro, later a cardinal, escalated to a statement that Aleandro was a Jew dissimulating as a Christian.

== Regional ==
=== In the Netherlands ===
In his native Rotterdam, the Erasmus University Rotterdam, Erasmus Bridge, Erasmus MC and Gymnasium Erasmianum have been named in his honor. Between 1997 and 2009, one of the main metro lines of the city was named Erasmuslijn. The Foundation Erasmus House (Rotterdam), is dedicated to celebrating Erasmus's legacy. Three moments in Erasmus's life are celebrated annually. On 1 April, the city celebrates the publication of his best-known book The Praise of Folly. On 11 July, the Night of Erasmus celebrates the lasting influence of his work. His birthday is celebrated on 28 October.

=== In Spain ===
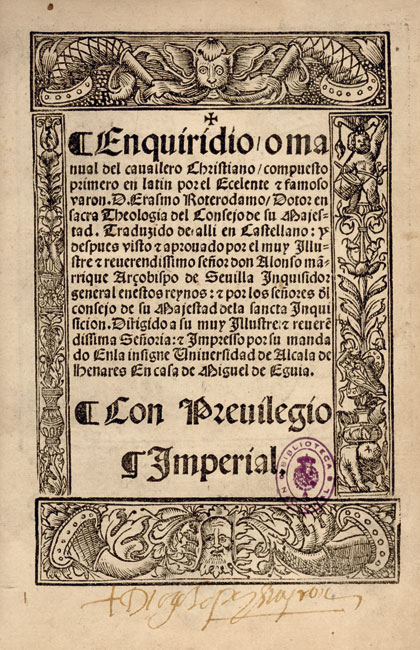
Enquiridio o manual del caballero Christiano, translation by Alonso Fernandez, published by Miguel de Eguía (1528) into Spanish of Erasmus' Enchiridion

Erasmus became extraordinarily popular and influential in Spain, including in and around the talent pool (often from converso families) that formed the early Jesuits. There were at least Castilian 120 translations, editions, or adaptations of Erasmus' writings between 1520 and 1552, though some, notably The Praise of Folly, were translations of excepts or paraphrases.

However, Erasmians and their associates faced, at times, extraordinary pushback from the theologians at Salamanca and Vallodolid, for being associated with the alumbrado and illuminist tendencies, with many (notably Ignatius of Loyola, who had lived in the house of publisher Miguel de Eguía at the time the Spanish edition of the Enchiridion was being published) (Note: One historian reports that the translation was undertaken at the behest of Ven. Cardinal Cisneros (d. 1517), the Archbishop of Toledo.) resorting to exile rather than facing the Inquisition, house arrest, imprisonment or worse. However, at times the heads of the Inquisition were themselves Erasmians.

Erasmus faced a notable semi-secret trial in Valladolid in 1527, attended by numerous bishops, abbots and theologians. Its records still exist. It disbanded without condemning Erasmus as a heretic, as most of his contentious beliefs were regarded as respectable or useful by at least some important bishops, and the fanciful interpretations of the accusers did not stand up to scrutiny.

Historian Nathan Ron notes that the debate on the enslavement of Amerindians by Bartolomé de las Casas at Valladolid almost 30 years later was to some extent a re-run, both featuring Sepúlveda: "The arguments Sepúlveda raised against las Casas were essentially identical to those raised against Erasmus by Pio and by Diego López Zúñiga, a bitter rival of Erasmus, on the grounds of Erasmus’ alleged opposition to a “just war” and to war against the Turks."

From the 1530s, historians note the start of a widespread disenchantment with Erasmus' approach: however his ideas and works were still circulating enough that even fifty years later Miguel Cervantes' "Erasmianism" may not have come from him having read any Erasmus directly. A century later, the poet Quevedo expressed the then common criticism that Erasmus had been a stalking horse of Luther, but it seems he had read and used banned Latin works by Erasmus, and had quite assimilated Erasmian thought, perhaps through Jesuit influence.

=== In Poland ===
According to historian Howard Louthan "Few regions embraced Erasmus as enthusiastically as Poland, and nowhere else did he have such a concentration of allies positioned at the highest levels of society including the king himself."

A notable group of "Erasmian" intellectuals were active in the 1960s.

=== In England ===
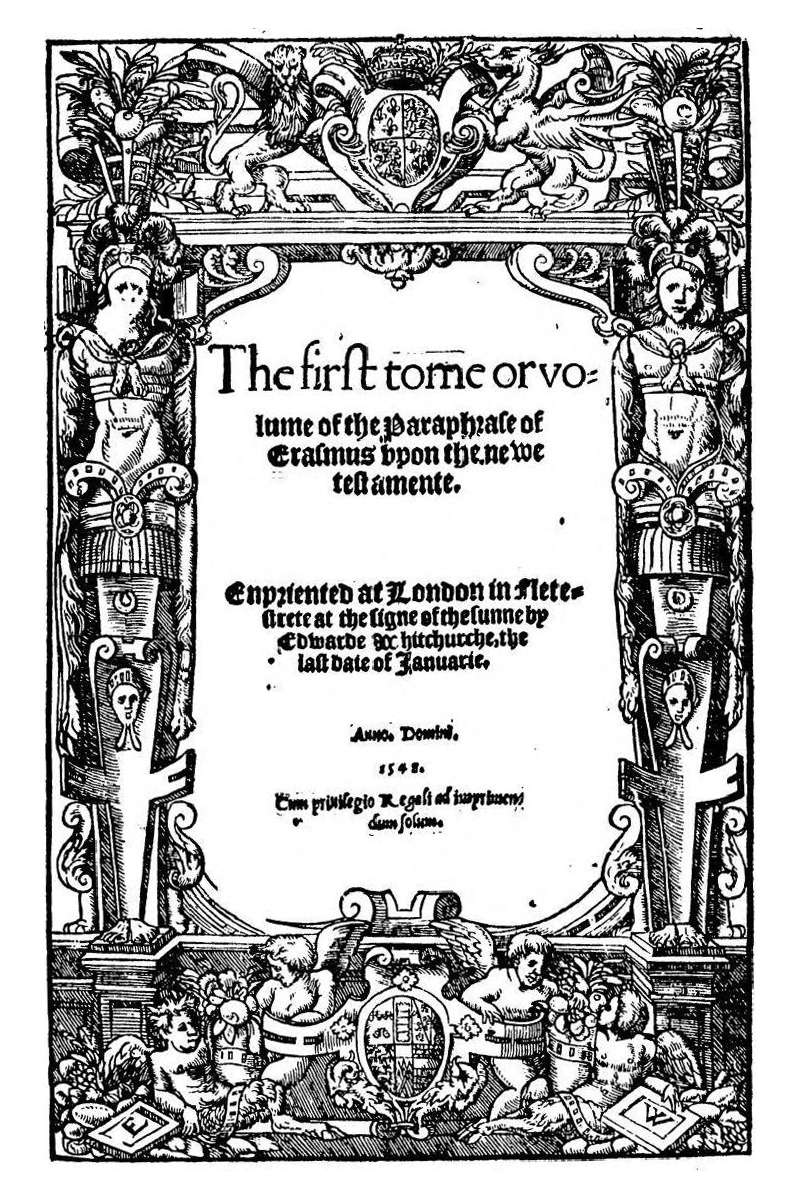
English translation Paraphrase of Erasmus, 1548

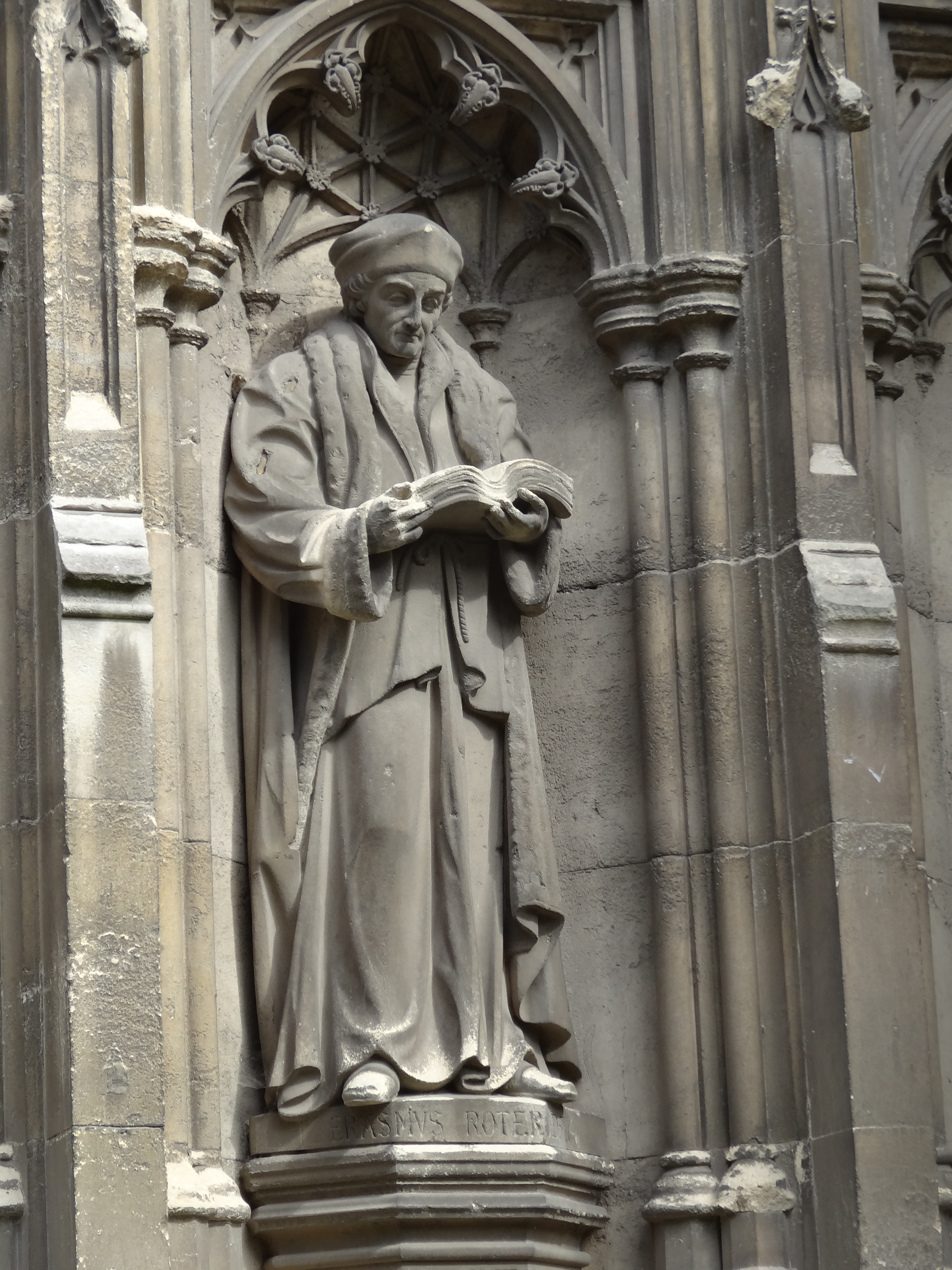
Statue (1870), Canterbury Cathedral

Erasmus influenced Catholic and Protestant humanists alike.

Historian Lucy Wooding argues (in Christopher Haigh's paraphrases) that "England nearly had a Catholic Reformation along Erasmian lines – but it was cut short by (Queen) Mary's death and finally torpedoed by the Council of Trent." (Note: "Even before Henry VIII fell out with the pope, Erasmian humanism had given some English Catholics an evangelical enthusiasm for Scripture and a distaste for popular devotions thought to be superstitious. Catholic evangelicals and moderate Protestants differed little on the authority of Scripture and the roles of faith and works in justification.") The initial Henrican closure of smaller monasteries followed the Erasmian agenda, which was also shared by Catholic humanists such as Reginald Pole; however the later violent closures and iconoclasm were far from Erasmus' program.

Erasmus had exchanged letters and prepared special editions of his books for Henry VIII, with an intent to channel Henry's belligerence, which for a time succeeded in turning Henry from waging war to writing pamphlets against Luther; Henry read carefully and annotated various books Erasmus sent him, notably the Paraphrases of the Gospels. However Henry later used Erasmus' insistence that Christian princes' policies should be based on pastoral care for their subjects to justify taking over church supervision and property. Historian Aysha Pollnitz puts it that "in the 1530s, Erasmus’ account of the Christian prince was made over into a velvet glove to encase the grasping royal fist." In 1539, Cardinal Pole warned that English readers should not tolerate the cherry-picking of Erasmus' writings by Henry's apologists.

After reading Erasmus' 1516 New Testament, Thomas Bilney "felt a marvellous comfort and quietness," and won over his Cambridge friends, future notable bishops, Matthew Parker and Hugh Latimer to reformist biblicism.

Both Lutheran Tyndale and his Catholic theological opponent Thomas More are considered Erasmians, and all three supported popular knowledge of scripture in the vernacular. One of William Tyndale's earliest works was his translation of Erasmus' Enchiridion (1522,1533). Following their deaths in 1536, Tyndale's English New Testament and anti-Catholic Preface was often printed (sometimes omitting Tyndale's name) in diglot editions paired with Erasmus' Latin translation and either his Paraclecis or his Preface to the Paraphrase of St Matthew.

In the reign of Edward VI, English translations of Erasmus' Paraphrases of the four Gospels were legally required to be chained for public access in every church. Furthermore, all priests below a certain scholastic level (i.e., the postgraduate B.D.) were required to have their own copy of the complete Paraphrases of the New Testament. (Note: "Euery pryest under a certayne degree in scholes is bounden by the kynges Maiesties most gracious injunctions to have provided by a daye lymited for his owne study and erudicion the whole Paraphrase of D. Erasmus upon the newe testamente both in Latine and Englishe" according to translator John Old or Myles Coverdale.) This injunction was to an extent frustrated by delays in printing, but it is estimated that as many as 20,000 to 30,000 copies may have been printed between 1548 and 1553: the mid-century generation of Anglican priests, and therefore their congregations, were highly exposed to Erasmus' exegesis.

Erasmus' grammar, Adages, Copia, and other books continued as the core Latin educational material in England for the following centuries. For example, the poet-rhetorician martyr Edmund Campion was educated at St Paul's School using Erasmus' textbooks and Latin curriculum. Erasmus' works and editions (in translation) are regularly connected with William Shakespeare, to Shakespeare's education, inspirations and sources (such as the shipwreck scene in The Tempest.) John Locke rejected the idea that Erasmus had remained Catholic, but instead was the source for "an undogmatically reasonable Protestantism." Daniel Defoe, author of Robinson Crusoe, mentioned he first read of the shipwreck of Aristippus in the English translation of Erasmus' Apophthegmata. Scholars have noted Erasmus' influence on Jonathan Swift, particular that The Praise of Folly seems to have been the literary inspiration for A Tale of a Tub.

Historian of literature Cathy Schrank has written that Erasmus' reputation and status changed over the course of the English "Long Reformation" from "being presented as a proto-Reformer, to problematically orthodox, to irenic martyr." The requirement under Edward and Elizabeth that churches provide a public copy of the Paraphrases was periodically held up by Jacobean English anti-Calvinists, such as Bishops Bilson and Stillingfleet, as a historical proof that Anglican doctrine actually disallowed predestinationism and allowed free will. For some Restoration Anglicans, both those promoting enforced anti-extremism and latitudinarians, and into the Age of Enlightenment, Erasmus' moderation represented "an alternative to the belligerent Protestantism that characterized English political and social discourse". It has been claimed that William of Orange's Toleration Act (1688) owed to Erasmus' inspiration.

By 1711, English Catholic poet and satirist Alexander Pope pictured Erasmus, following in a sequence of greats from Aristotle, Horace, Homer, Quintillian to Longinus, ending a millennium of ignorance and superstition: (Note: Pope later wrote of "that excellent example of that great man and great saint, Erasmus, who in the midst of calumny proceeded with all the calmness of innocence, the unrevenging spirit of primitive Christianity!" and in a letter to Jonathan Swift "Yet am I of the Religion of Erasmus, a Catholick; so I live; so I shall die; and hope one day to meet you...")

...
Much was believ'd, but little understood,
And to be dull was constru'd to be good;
A second deluge learning thus o'er-run,
And the monks finish'd what the Goths begun.

At length Erasmus, that great injur'd name
(The glory of the priesthood and the shame!)
Stemm'd the wild torrent of a barbarous age,
And drove those holy Vandals off the stage.

— Alexander Pope, An Essay on Criticism

For Enlightenment historian Edward Gibbon, Erasmus was "the father of rational theology." An 1876 Edition of The Praise of Folly said of him "Erasmus was the most facetious man, and the greatest critic of his age. [...] Perhaps no man has obliged the public with a greater number of useful volumes than our author."

By 1929, G. K. Chesterton could write "I doubt if any thinking person, of any belief or unbelief, does not wish in his heart that the end of mediaevalism had meant the triumph of the Humanists like Erasmus and More, rather than of the rabid Puritans like Calvin and Knox."

== Catholic ==
=== Maverick or orthodox? ===
Scholars have shifted from treating Erasmus primarily as a constitutional outsider to seeing him as a well-connected insider.

Similarly, characterizations of his doctrinal beliefs in more recent times tend to demonstrate orthodox (and patristic) and mainstream (late medieval) provenance. Erasmus owned the works of Jean Gerson, a favourite of Thomas More, who had in the previous century championed lay spirituality and some degree of devout, non-apocalyptic biblicism and warned against philosophical squabbling: a constant corrective tendency through the high and late Western Middle Ages, associated with names such as William of Auxerre, some of the Victorines, John of Paris, Pierre d'Ailly and the by-then forgotten Durandus of Saint-Pourçain. Erasmus made enemies by frequently being scathingly underwhelmed by medieval theologians, with the partial exceptions of the pre-scholastics Bede and Bernard of Clairvaux.

From his time (1493–1495) as Latin secretary to Henricus de Berghes, Bishop of Cambrai, Erasmus would have been well aware of that diocese' mandatory statutes Sacris ordinibus (1307) in-force on priests, which included literacy, age, residence and financial requirements, including taking an examination; themes which Erasmus continued to promote throughout his life. These statutes were further re-enforced by Henricus, especially in 1495 (i.e., in text Erasmus may have drafted) regarding the duties of benefice holders to look after their parishioners, on pain of excommunication.

==== Councils ====
Several of Erasmus' "distinctive" ideas were entirely mainstream for the time, from the Fifth Council of the Lateran (1512-1517) (which Erasmus had been invited to attend as John Fisher's theologian): (Note: Erasmus nearly attended the Fifth Lateran Council: in 1512, Bishop John Fisher invited Erasmus to join his delegation, but Erasmus was prevented by circumstance. Erasmus oscillated in his view of the Lateran Council: because he believed that Pope Julius had been simonatically and therefore invalidly elected, he thought Julius could not validly summon a council; further that some results had lacked the acceptance of the church. However, he supported Pope Leo's continuation of the Council.)

- the need for peace between Catholic princes before a war pushing back the Turks could be attempted (Session 9);
- the need for formal qualifications of preachers (Session 11) who should "foster everywhere peace and mutual love" rather than false miracles and apocalyptic predictions;
- the danger of unbalanced philosophical study and questions that promote doubt without attempting resolution (Session 8);
- the spurious independence of friars from local bishops,
- the dereliction of duty by absentee bishops and cardinals, and
- a positive disinterest in apocalypticism in favour of practical preaching. (Note: From 1516, Catholic preachers were forbidden from apocalyptic preaching with specific or general dates: preachers must not "presume to preach or declare a fixed time for future evils, the coming of antichrist or the precise day of judgment; for Truth says, it is not for us to know times or seasons which the Father has fixed by his own authority." Public preaching should be limited to "only what the people who flock to their sermons will find useful, by means of reflection and practical application, for rooting out vices, praising virtues and saving the souls of the faithful.")

The Council of Trent further addressed many of the controversies Erasmus had been involved with: including free will, accumulated errors in the Vulgate, and priestly training, (Note: Erasmus promoted the idea of priestly seminaries, and a historian was written "Erasmus’ contribution to the reform of Catholic preaching at Trent was in fact substantial, though certainly unacknowledged and probably suppressed, and ...(Erasmus' book) Ecclesiastes anticipated and informed Catholic preaching in the inter- and post- Tridentine years.") and followed his call for a renewed positive focus on the Creed. Erasmus' major ethical complaint that a certain kind of scholasticism was "curiositas" (useless, vain speculation) and artificially divisive was endorsed in the 4 December 1563 Decree Concerning Purgatory which recommended the avoidance of speculations and non-essential questions. For music and chant, Trent reduced the number of sequences during the Mass to only four for certain special days: the large numbers and lengths of sequences, especially as found in German and French masses, and the need for verbal clarity were issues Erasmus had raised. Despite these, the Council of Trent is frequently characterized as pushing back against the humanist program, for example by its ambiguous declaration that the Vulgate Latin bible text should be regarded as "authentic."

Many commentors, such as Catholic scholar Thomas Cummings, see parallels between Erasmus' vision of Church reform and the vision of Church reform that succeeded at the Second Vatican Council. Theologian J. Coppens noted the "Erasmian themes" of Lumen Gentium (e.g. para 12), such as the sensus fidei fidelium and the dignity of all the baptized. Another scholar writes "in our days, especially after Vatican II, Erasmus is more and more regarded as an important defender of the Christian religion." John O'Malley has commented on a certain closeness between Erasmus and Dei verbum.

==== Papal teaching ====
Many of Erasmus' themes are now less controversial after being revisited by Popes: for example,

- Soon after the Vatican I Council, Pope Leo XIII issued an encyclical Providentissimus deus (1893) which taught several themes associated with Erasmus: notably that "in those things which do not come under the obligation of faith, the Saints were at liberty to hold divergent opinions, just as we ourselves are";
- In the same encyclical, Leo XIII taught that more exegetes, theologians and novices must master the original "Oriental" languages and be trained in Biblical exegesis including philology, quoting Jerome "To be ignorant of the Scripture is not to know Christ": he noted that Pope Clement V had instigated chairs of Oriental Literature in Paris, Bologna, Oxford and Salamanca (carried out in 1317.) (Note: There is an oblique reference to the likes of Erasmus, Cajetan, Cisneros, etc: "Nor must we forget how many learned men there were, chiefly among the religious orders, who did excellent work for the Bible between the Council of Vienne and that of Trent; men who, by the employment of modern means and appliances, and by the tribute of their own genius and learning, not only added to the rich stores of ancient times, but prepared the way for the succeeding century, the century which followed the Council of Trent, when it almost seemed that the great age of the Fathers had returned.") This was followed by an apostolic letter Vigilantiae studiique (1902) which "warned that attacks on the Church are (now) generally based on linguistic arguments".
- Pope Pius XII's "large-minded" encyclical Mediator Dei (1947) endorses Erasmus's emphasis on interiority and preparation of the heart and life, though without his anti-ceremonial hyperbole; (Note: See paragraphs 23 ("The worship rendered by the Church to God must be, in its entirety, interior as well as exterior."), 24 ("But the chief element of divine worship must be interior.") and 31 ("[...] if [the sacraments and sacraments of the altar] are to produce their proper effect, it is absolutely necessary that our hearts be properly disposed to receive them.").)
- that all interpretation of Scripture should rest on the literal sense was taught by Pope Benedict XV's Spiritus paracletus (1920), and by Pope Pius XII Divino afflante spiritu (1943), which called for new vernacular translations, and Humani generis (1950);
- his promotion of the recognition of adiaphora and toleration within bounds was taken up, to an extent, by Pope John XXIII: In necessariis unitas, in dubiis libertas, in omnibus caritas (Note: I.e., in necessary things, unity; in dubious matters, liberty; in all things, charity/love. The phrase was coined after Erasmus' time. A more accurate characterization of Erasmus' views might be that while a certain docility was ideal for laypeople in theological matters, the quid pro quo was that theologians and bishops should keep the defined doctrines to a minimum. For example, see Tracy, James D. (1981). "Erasmus and the Arians: Remarks on the "Consensus Ecclesiae"". The Catholic Historical Review. 67 (1): 1–10. ISSN 0008-8080. JSTOR 25020997. or Cummings, Brian (5 December 2002). The Literary Culture of the Reformation. doi:10.1093/acprof:oso/9780198187356.003.0005.) in the encyclical Ad Petri Cathedram which includes a quite Erasmian agenda Truth, Unity and Peace in a spirit of Charity; and
- John Paul II's praise of the divine foolishness in the encyclical Fides et Ratio.
- His instrumentalist approach to Christian humanism has been compared to that of John Henry Newman and the personalism of John Paul II, (Note: He believed that "learning and scholarship were a powerful weapon both for the cultivation of personal piety and institutional church reform.") but also has been criticized as treating the Church's doctrines merely as aids to piety. (Note: Catholic dogmatic theologian Aidan Nichols however notes that, in justice, "for Erasmus himself, the doctrine of redemption (understood as beginning with the incarnation of the Word) remained central as giving the whole world a Christocentric orientation: the goal of all living things is the harmony of all things, and especially human beings, with God, a harmony realized, in principle, in Christ.")

==== Liturgical contribution ====
Notably, since the 1950s, the Roman Catholic Easter Vigil mass has included a Renewal of Baptismal Promises, an innovation first proposed by Erasmus in his Paraphrases. (Note: For which he was predictably accused of heresy by his university opponents, who claimed he was inventing a new sacrament.)

==== Religious communities ====
Several of the Catholic religious reforms or changes had parallels in Erasmus' ideas. For example, the rise of non-mendicant, non-cloistered, non-choir-based societies such as notably the Jesuits, and changes to the rules relating to formal vows.

=== Supporters ===
Erasmus was continually protected by popes, bishops, inquisitors-general, and Catholic kings (Note: By 1524, his disciples included, in his words, "the (Holy Roman) Emperor, the Kings of England, France, and Denmark, Prince Ferdinand of Germany, the Cardinal of England, the Archbishop of Canterbury, and more princes, more bishops, more learned and honourable men than I can name, not only in England, Flanders, France, and Germany, but even in Poland and Hungary...") during his lifetime. (Note: For example, in 1527, Pope Clement VII wrote to the Spanish Inquisitor General that he should silence those who attacked Erasmus' non-Lutheran doctrine; and Charles V (King of Spain, King of Germany, King of Sicily, Archduke of Austria, Duke of Brabant, Holy Roman Emperor) wrote to Erasmus his support. Erasmus corresponded with a succession of protective Inquisitors General of Castille/Spain in the 1510s and 1520s, consulting with them on his work and attacks on it.)

He was a bishops' man: promoting the episcopal and apostolic system and in constant contact, correspondence, patronage and direction with dozens at any time, and their Latin secretaries: for example, his book On Free Will was squeezed out of him by bishops, and strategized, discussed, vetted (his local bishop in Basel got him to remove some polemic material from it, for example) and promoted by them. His relationship with his patron Archbishop of Canterbury William Warham was so close that Warham even wanted Erasmus to share his grave.

The following generation of saints and scholars included many influenced by Erasmian humanism or spirituality, notably Ignatius of Loyola, (Note: "A.H.T. Levi notes that the preface to Erasmus's commentary on Matthew's Gospel, published in 1522, 'contains all the major features of Ignatius's spirituality embryonically, including the principle of the discretio spirituum (the discernment of the spirits) and, among much else taken by Ignatius, the idea of imaginatively reconstructing the episodes of Jesus’ life for meditative prayer that was to form the body of the Spiritual Exercises. Ignatius claimed to have given up reading the Enchiridion finding it cold, however historian Moshe Sluhovsky traces an influence on Ignatius' Exercises from Ven. Cardinal Cisneros' posthumous Compendio breve de ejercidos espirituales (1520) on which he in turn traces an influence from Erasmus' Enchiridion.) Teresa of Ávila, (Note: Spanish scholar Antonio Pérez-Romero has claimed a bias in New World traditionalist Spanish Catholic biographers dealing with "the apparent affinity between St. Teresa and Erasmus": "the traditional castizo line that all alleged foreign influences must be discarded. However, [...] whether St. Teresa was influenced by Erasmus or by pre-Erasmian spirituality is really irrelevant; what matters is that this spirituality went against castizo religiosity.") John of Ávila, (Note: John recommended a friend, García Arias, read Erasmus, but to be discrete about it: "What happens in your heart in relation to God, be careful to keep to yourself, as a woman should keep to herself that which occurs in the marriage bed with her husband." (Decades later, Arias was prior of a monastery attacked by the Inquisition for having a cell of secret Lutherans; one of the monks who fled this persecution, Casiodoro de Reina, became a Protestant in exile and translated the Biblia del Oso and works of the irenical Sebastian Castellion.)) and Angela Merici. (Note: "As emerges from Merici's writings and according to her friends, Angela was well read in spiritual literature (she was familiar with the Scriptures, Augustine, Gregory the Great, Jacopo da Varagine's Life of Saints, and probably with Domenico Cavalca, Catherine of Siena, The Imitation of Christ, and Erasmus's writings)...") Bartolomé de las Casas relied on several of Erasmus' arguments in his Valladolid debates against the "natural slavery" of Amerindians.

In 1517, writing to Thomas More when working with Cuthbert Tunstall (himself a future Bishop) on the second edition of the New Testament, Erasmus noted that he had been offered a bishopric, the first offer of several, all rejected. Several sources claim that Erasmus had been offered a cardinalship at the end of his life as well.

In the last year of his life, Pope Paul III appointed him in 1535 as Provost of the Canons in Deventer (i.e., the famous semi-monastic Brethren of the Common Life chapter of the town where he first learned Latin) as a reward for "fighting with all your ability against the deserters of the faith", and lauded "your virtue and erudition" but "also your judgement and intentions."

=== Opponents ===
However, Erasmus attracted enemies in contemporary theologians in Paris, Louvain, Valladolid, Salamanca and Rome, notably Sepúlveda, Stúñica, Edward Lee, (Note: See Erasmus' response titled Apologia by Erasmus of Rotterdam Which Is neither Arrogant nor Biting nor Angry nor Aggressive in Which He Responds to the Two Invectives of Edward Lee- I Shall Not Add What Kind of Invectives: Let the Reader Judge for Himself. Thomas More, who was old friends with both Erasmus and Lee, wrote to Lee "Not only do all learned men both in Louvain and here disagree with you on each of these points, but the pope, best and greatest of primates, who ought to take precedence over all learned men's votes, disagrees with you.… For at his pious urging Erasmus obediently undertook that task, which with God's help he has now performed twice with success, and thereby he has twice earned the pope's special thanks and approval, as his solemn missives acknowledge.") Noël Beda (who Erasmus had known in France in the 1490s, but who opposed Greek and Hebrew), Petrus Sutor, as well as Alberto Pio, Count of Carpi (and former student of Aldus Manutius), who read his work with dedicated suspicion. These theologians were usually from the mendicant orders that were Erasmus' particular target (such as Dominicans, Carmelites and Franciscans); they held a positive-going "linear view of history" for theology (Note: "The linear paradigm puts the emphasis on a one-dimensional human history which heads to a point of perfection, where it should come to an end." However, the views of reformers such as Giles of Viterbo tended to a negative linear view of spiritual decay, or was cyclical.) that privileged recent late-medieval theology and rejected the ad fontes methodology. Erasmus believed the vehemence of the attacks on Luther was a strategem to blacken humanism (and himself) by association, part of the centuries-long power struggle at the universities between scholastic "theologians" and humanist "poets". (Note: Erasmus' riposte—against the idea that less biblicism and more scholasticism was the answer—was that Wycliffe, Hus, Luther, Oecolampadius, the Anabaptists, and Hubmaier all were trained in Scholastic theology (as to an extent was he, though he claimed to have slept through the classes, particularly on Scotus): he implied that scholastic training had more caused than prevented any argumentative, doctrinaire, unbalanced, un-historical, distracted and intellectually-proud mindset. This was an implied rebuke also to the antagonistic university Scholastic theologians, to the extent that they exhibited the same mindset.) (Note: Some recent historians have suggested Erasmus may have lost his election to the Lady Margaret's professorship at Cambridge due to this rivalry between scholastics and humanists.)

A particularly powerful opponent of Erasmus was Italian humanist Jerome Aleander, Erasmus' former close friend and bedmate in Venice at the Aldine Press and future cardinal. They fell out over Aleander's violent speech against Luther at the Diet of Worms, and with Aleander's identification of Erasmus as "the great cornerstone of the Lutheran heresy." (Note: It was not helped by Erasmus' Ciceronians nor when Erasmus insultingly made Aleander a thinly-disguised character Verpius in his collequy on the miserly Manutius household Opulentia sordida (1531). Erasmus suspected Aleander tried to have him poisoned.) They periodically reconciled in warm personal meetings, only to fall into mutual suspicion again when distant.

In 1531 the prestigious theology faculty of the University of Paris censured over 100 propositions they claimed were in his writings, however he denied the accuracy of the interpretations and the logic of the conclusions.

Erasmus spent considerable effort defending himself in writing, which he could not do after his death. He wrote 35 books defending against accusations by Catholic opponents, and 9 against Protestant opponents: an unanswered accusation of heresy or Nicodemism could cascade into trials and fatal unsafety.

=== Catholic regional prohibitions ===
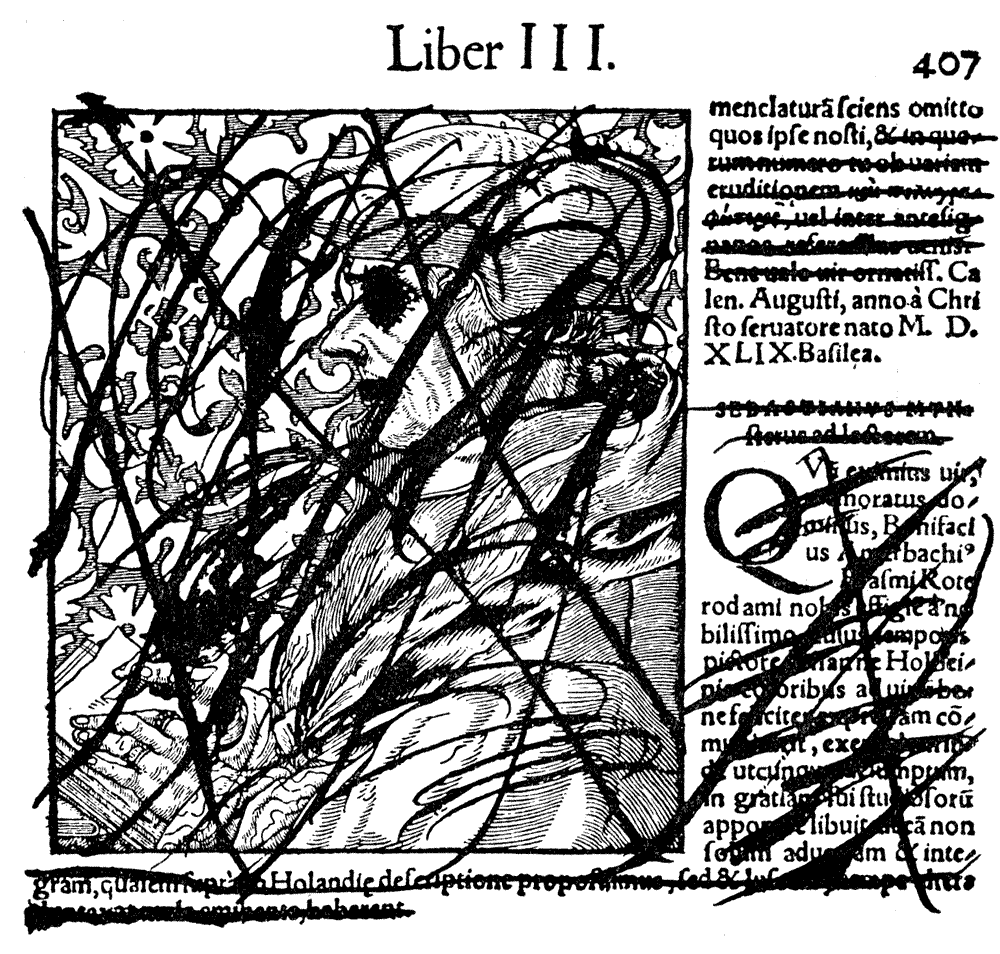
A work of Erasmus censored, perhaps following the inclusion of some works on the Index Librorum Prohibitorum

Erasmus' peak posthumous influence, in the 1540s, was followed by a rapid marked downturn in reception.

Erasmus' work had been translated or reprinted throughout Europe, often with Protestantizing revisions and sectarian prefaces. Sometimes the works of Martin Luther were sold with the name of Erasmus on the cover. By around 1555, Erasmus' Latin books were no longer being printed under his name. From then, at various times and durations, various of Erasmus' works, especially in Protestantized or bastardized editions, were placed on the various Roman, Dutch, French, Spanish and Mexican Indexes of Prohibited Books, either to not be read, or needing to be censored and expurgated: each area had different censorship considerations and severity.

- Several of Erasmus' works, including his Paraphrases were banned in the Milanese and Venetian indexes of 1554.
- Erasmus' works were to some extent prohibited in England under Queen Mary I, from 1555. (Note: Mary herself had a decade earlier translated at least the draft of The Paraphrasis of Erasmus vpon saynt Mathew, translated into Englysh, so the ban may have been a reaction the addition in the English Paraphrases of Tyndale's version of Luther's Prologue to Romans, and Swiss Protestant Leo Jud's paraphrase of the Book of Revelation, to the editions.)
- For the Papal States, in the Roman Index as it emerged at the close of the Council of Trent, Erasmus's works were completely banned (1559), mostly unbanned except for unauthorized editions of Italian translations (1564), completely banned again (1590), and then mostly unbanned again with strategic revisions (1596) by the erratic Indexes of successive Popes.
- In Spain's Index, the translation of the Enchiridion only needed the climactic phrase "Monkishness is not piety" removed to become acceptable. Despite any Indexes, Charles V had The Education of a Christian Prince, which had been written for him, translated into Spanish for his son Philip II.
  - It is notable that instead a posthumous translation, of Erasmus's rival Alberto Pio's book against ideas ascribed to Erasmus, was itself placed on the Spanish (and Portuguese) Indexes throughout the 1550s, seemingly for misrepresenting Erasmus's text and promoting scandal.

In the 1559 Roman Index, Erasmus was classed with heretics but removed in the 1564 Tridentine index; however Erasmus was never judicially arraigned, tried or convicted of heresy: the censorship rules established by the Council of Trent targeted not only notorious heretics but also those whose writings "excited heresy" (regardless of intent), especially those making Latin translations of the New Testament deemed to vie with (rather than improve or annotate or assist) the Vulgate.

The Colloquies were especially but not universally frowned on for school use, and many of Erasmus' tendentious prefaces and notes to his scholarly editions required adjustment.

By 1896, the Roman Index still listed Erasmus' Colloquia, The Praise of Folly, The Tongue, The Institution of Christian Marriage, and one other as banned, plus particular editions of the Adagia and Paraphrase of Matthew. All other works could be read in suitable expurgated versions.

Because Erasmus' scholarly editions were frequently the only sources of Patristic information in print, the strict bans were often impractical, so theologians worked to produce replacement editions building on, or copying, Erasmus' editions.

The Jesuits received a dispensation from the Roman Inquisitor General to read and use Erasmus' work (not kept on the open shelves of their libraries), as did priests working near Protestant areas such as Francis de Sales.

=== Post-Tridentine suspicion ===
Early Dutch Jesuit scholar Peter Canisius, who produced several works superseding Erasmus', (Note: Catechisms, preaching manuals, works of St Cyril of Alexandria, and a collection of St Jerome intended to counter the anti-monastic spin given in Erasmus'.) is known to have read, or used phrases from, Erasmus' New Testament (including the Annotations and Notes) and perhaps the Paraphrases, his Jerome biography and complete works, the Adages, the Copia, and the Colloquies: (Note: Canisius' comment against personal attacks on Reformers "With words like these, we don't cure patients, we make them incurable" re-works Erasmus' "It is better to cure a sick man than to kill him.") Canisius, having actually read Erasmus, had an ambivalent view on Erasmus that contrasted with the negative line of some of his contemporaries:

Very many people applied also to Erasmus, declaring: 'Either Erasmus speaks like Luther or Luther like Erasmus' (Aut Erasmus Lutherizat, aut Lutherus Erasmizat). And yet, we must say, if we would like to render an honest judgment, that Erasmus and Luther were very different. Erasmus always remained a Catholic. [...]Erasmus criticized religion 'with craft rather than with force', often applying considerable caution and moderation to either his own opinions or errors. [...]Erasmus passed judgment on what he thought required censure and correction in the teaching of theologians and in the Church.

— Peter Canisius, De Maria virgine (1577), p601 (Note: Pabel notes an ambivalent attitude: "After rehearsing the many ways in which Erasmus offended Catholic beliefs about and devotion to Mary, Canisius managed not only to think of Erasmus as more of a friend than a foe of Mary but also, bizarrely, to suggest that Erasmus was still the most distinguished voice in honour of Mary. Then he remembered that Erasmus was responsible for stirring up the controversy about Mary in the first place.")

In contrast, Robert Bellarmine's Controversies mentions Erasmus (as presented by Erasmus' opponent Albert Pío) negatively over 100 times, categorizing him as a "forerunner of the heretics"; though not a heretic. (Note: Bellarmine himself had books placed on the same Roman Index as Erasmus.) Alphonsus Ligouri, who also had not read Erasmus, judged that Erasmus "died with the character of an unsound Catholic but not a heretic," putting it all in the context of a dispute between Theologians and Rhetoricians. (Note: However, Ligouri re-transmits Albert Pío's libel, which Luther also repeated garbled, but which was denied by Erasmus in his lifetime, that Erasmus' statement "We dare to call the Holy Spirit true God, proceeding from the Father and the Son, something the ancients did not dare to do" as asserting it is rash to call the Holy Spirit God. In context, Erasmus' claim concerned the objective historical record, used the language of the Mass about boldness not rashness, affirmed the Trinity and, in retrospect, proposed the development of doctrine.)

His patristic scholarship continued to be valued by academics, as were un-controversial parts of his biblical scholarship, though Catholic biblical scholars started to criticize Erasmus' limited range of manuscripts for his direct New Testament as undermining his premise of correcting the Latin from the "original" Greek.

The Jesuit mission to China, led by Matteo Ricci, adopted the approach of cultural accommodation linked to Erasmus. (Note: "The method of accommodation, central in the missionary activity of Matteo Ricci, has its theological roots in the thought of Thomas Aquinas and Erasmus of Rotterdam," according to the Dean of Studies of the Pontifical Institute for Foreign Missions.) The early Jesuits were exposed to Erasmus at their colleges, and their positioning of Confucius echoed Erasmus' positioning of "Saint" Socrates.

Salesian scholars have noted Erasmus' significant influence on Francis de Sales: "in the approach and the spirit he (de Sales) took to reform his diocese and more importantly on how individual Christians could become better together," his optimism, civility, gentle anti-militantism that promoted "humility, penance, and asceticism" over sectarian violence, esteem of marriage. and, according to historian Charles Béné, a piety addressed to the laity, the acceptance of mental prayer, and the valuing of pagan wisdom.

A famous 17th century Dominican library featured statues of famous churchmen on one side and of famous "heretics" (in chains) on the other: those foes including the two leading anti-mendicant Catholic voices William of Saint-Amour (fl. 1250) and Erasmus.

By 1690, Erasmus was also, rather perversely, labelled as the forerunner of the heretical tendecies in the Jansenists. (Note: In 1688, a Jansenist book was written to English Catholic King James II, with the argument that in persecuting good Jansenists, the Church was being as wrong-headed as when it denounced critical but loyal Erasmus, blaming sleeping German bishops for the Reformation. Jansenists should be kept in the Church not repelled towards Protestantism. Erasmus' Catholic spirituality was held to be a reliable guide for King James, much to the puzzlement of John Locke, who reviewed the book. A book written in rebuttal saw nothing good in Erasmus' teachings and attacks on orthodoxy.)

From 1648 to 1794 and then 1845 to the present, the mainly-Jesuit Bollandist Society has been progressively publishing Lives of the Saints, in 61 volumes and supplements. Historian John C. Olin notes an accord of approach with the hitherto "unique" method, mixing critical standards and devotional/rhetorical purpose, that Erasmus had laid out in his Life of St Jerome.

By the 1700s, Erasmus' explicit influence on most Catholic thought had largely waned, though the humanist program remained a persistent undercurrent.

=== Twentieth century reappraisals ===
A historian has written that "a number of Erasmus' modern Catholic critics do not display an accurate knowledge of his writings but misrepresent him, often by relying upon hostile secondary sources," naming Yves Congar as an example.

A major turning point in the popular Catholic appraisal of Erasmus occurred in 1900 with rosy Benedictine historian (and, later, Cardinal) Francis Aidan Gasquet's The Eve of the Reformation which included a whole chapter on Erasmus based on a re-reading of his books and letters. Gasquet wrote "Erasmus, like many of his contemporaries, is often perhaps injudicious in the manner in which he advocated reforms. But when the matter is sifted to the bottom, it will commonly be found that his ideas are just." (Note: "He may fairly be taken as a type of the critical attitude of mind in which many even of the best and the most loyal Catholics of the day approached the consideration of the serious religious problems which were, at that time, forcing themselves upon the notice of the ecclesiastical authorities. Such men held that the best service a true son of the Church could give to religion was the service of a trained mind, ready to face facts as they were, convinced that the Christian faith had nothing to lose by the fullest light and the freest investigation, but at the same time protesting that they would suffer no suspicion to rest on their entire loyalty of heart to the authority of the teaching Church.")

Over the last century, Erasmus's Catholic reputation has gradually started to be rehabilitated: (Note: A centennial analysis of The Catholic Historical Review in 2015 noted repeatedly that the Catholic scholarly interpretation of Erasmus had evolved over the century from a "pre-Enlightenment rationalist" to a "sincere Catholic" and "genuine Christian" thinker.) favourable factors may include:

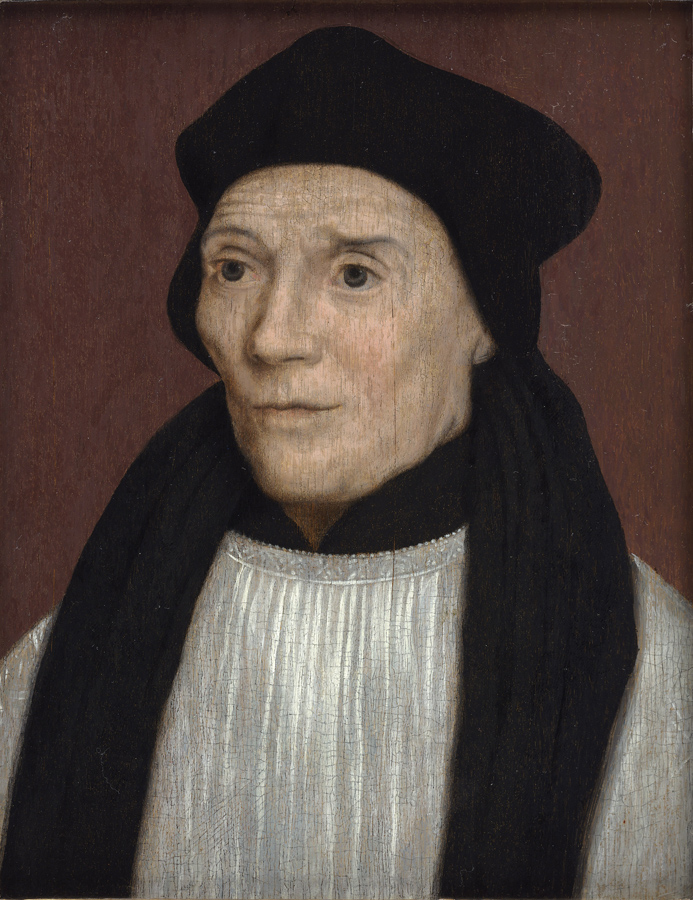
John Fisher, after Hans Holbein

- the increasingly active modern historical and theological scholarship on Erasmus suggested chinks in the traditional partisan characterizations of Erasmus;
- the retirement of the Roman Index librorum prohibitorum in 1966;
- increased support for a view of Erasmus that portrays him as a conservative (Note: Viz. his colleague Giles of Viterbo's comment on internality at the Fifth Lateran Council that "Religion should change men, not men religion" (i.e. doctrine).) endorsed by and responsive to the hierarchy as much as a maverick, with him voicing and crystallizing mainstream and respectable Catholic thought of his time (Note: Such as the Archbishop of Canterbury John Morton's criticisms of corruption in certain abbeys and monasteries.) as much as innovating; (Note: Historian Bruce Mansfield notes a 1936 doctoral dissertation Die Stellung des Erasmus von Rotterdam zur scholastischen Methode by a Redemptorist scholar Christian Dolfen that suggested that Erasmus was in fact not anti-Scholastic but wanted it practiced in moderation, as had Jean Gerson, and in any case was against the scholasticism of Duns Scotus not Aquinas.) and to an extent resuscitating Victorine (the Canons Regular of St Victor) and Cappadocian and patristic approaches.
- his deep, long friendships and interactions with three English Saint-Martyrs Thomas More, (Note: "Thomas More was an unflagging apologist for Erasmus for the thirty-six years of their adult lives (1499–1535)." Erasmus scholar, Fr. Keith McConica notes "The whole meaning of his (More's) reply to Tyndale…is that Erasmianism did not necessarily lead to heresy, and that in itself it was a highly salutary, if tragically unsuccessful attempt to awake the Church to urgent reform.") John Fisher, (Note: Scheck 2021, op cit., pits the discernment of one pair of canonized saints (More and Fisher) against another pair (Canesius and Bellarmine), quoting historian Rudolph Padberg "They (More and Fisher) knew Erasmus, they defended him...their assessment of Erasmus weighs more heavily than the assessment of the next generation and of the period of Church revolution, which saw itself compelled to turn all instruments of peace into weapons." R. Padberg, Erasmus als Katechet (Freiburg im Breisgau: Herder, 1956) 18–19) and Brigittine monk Richard Reynolds; and with confessor-bishops Cuthbert Tunstall and Stephen Gardiner, and with Archbishop of Canturbury William Warham.
- his acknowledged or retro-fitted influence on perhaps five Doctors of the Church (Ignatius, Theresa of Ávila, John of Ávila, Canisius, de Sales), the positive normalization of his views in influential new orders such as the Jesuits, Oratorians, Redemptorists, Ursulines and Salesians, (Note: There are other connections as well: in England in 1505, Erasmus was friendly with then-humanist Gian Pietro Carafa, later co-founder of the Theatines and much later still the Pope who first placed Erasmus; works on the Index.) and an increasing list of exemplary Catholics whose views in part channel or parallel Erasmus', such as Bartolomé de las Casas' De unico vocationis modo (1537), De la Salle's Decorum & Civility, (Note: Which builds on the genre Erasmus started with De Civilitate Morum Puerilium (1530), including his advice on the social necessity of knowing how to carve meat.) and Ven. Matteo Ricci's view on accommodation in missionary work.
- the acceptance of St John Henry Cardinal Newman's "development of doctrine", to some extent a chick hatched from the egg of Erasmus' theological historicism and his appeal to tradition (sensus fidei fidelium) on the Eucharist;
- the reinvigouration of patristic ad fontes and a re-surfacing of several ideas associated with Erasmus (but ideas sometimes with a longer, forgotten patrimony, and sometimes from an even more problematic figure than Erasmus) (Note: "Origen (who was for me, as once for Erasmus, more important than Augustine) became the key to the entire Greek patristics, the early Middle Ages and, indeed, even to Hegel and Karl Barth.") by ressourcement and Communio theologians, such as
  - Henri de Lubac (Note: "De Lubac's preface to G. Chantraine's 'Mystere' et 'Philosophie du Christ' selon Erasmus (1971) presents Erasmus as, above all, a theologian who concentrated on the mysterium, philosophia Christi, and the bond between exegesis and theology. " De Lubac thought Erasmus "bravely tried to relaunch spiritual exegesis at an unpropitious time." Nichols, Aidan (2007). Divine fruitfulness: a guide through Balthasar's theology beyond the trilogy. London: T & T Clark. ISBN 978-0567089335. p67)
  - Hans Urs von Balthasar, who ranked Erasmus with Augustine, Bonaventure, and Thomas Aquinas as the great theologians/exegetes; (Note: Von Balthasar, Theo-Drama, Volume 1: Prolegomena)
  - Oratorian Louis Bouyer, who wrote that the Method of True Theology (or Ratio) of Erasmus "represents, for the first time and in admirable fashion, the use of principles and methods entirely adequate to effect a really fruitful renewal of Catholic faith and theology;"
  - Joseph Ratzinger, whose famous Regensberg Address emphasized the fundamental influence of Hellenic philosophy on primitive Christianity. (Note: Summarized as "The evolution of Greek thought represented by Socrates ‘stands in close analogy’ with the evolution of Old Testament religiosity. Christianity is the result of their actual convergence.")
  - For theologian George Chantraine, Erasus's so-called skepticism was actually a function of his belief that the Church defined doctrine not individual theologians. (Note: In Daniel Kinney's summary: "Erasmus, the servant of piety and gradual regeneration through the humble imitation of Christ, would prefer to play skeptic when it comes to questions of doctrine (like that of free will) which the Church has not settled definitively (Diatribe (On Free Will) 1 a 4), since the actual settling of dogma is outside his competence.")

=== Post-Vatican II ===
Theologian Lisa Cahill's summary "Official Catholic Social Thought on Nonviolence" notes Erasmus (with Augustine, Aquinas and St Francis of Assisi) as most notable in the development of Catholic peace theory. (Note: He "depicted war as inhuman and unholy, especially deplored violence by those claiming to act in God's name, and saw peace as so necessary to the blessings of life that war should be avoided at virtually any cost. Although just war theory has historically been the most influential framework for Catholic teaching on the political use of force, it has always been secondary to the Catholic Christian commitment to peace.")

In 1963, Thomas Merton suggested "If there had been no Luther, Erasmus would now be regarded by everyone as one of the great Doctors of the Catholic Church. I like his directness, his simplicity, and his courage. All the qualities of Erasmus, and other qualities besides, were canonized in Thomas More."

In his 1987 collection The Spirituality of Erasmus of Rotterdam historian Richard deMolen, later a Catholic priest, called for Erasmus' canonization.

== Protestant ==
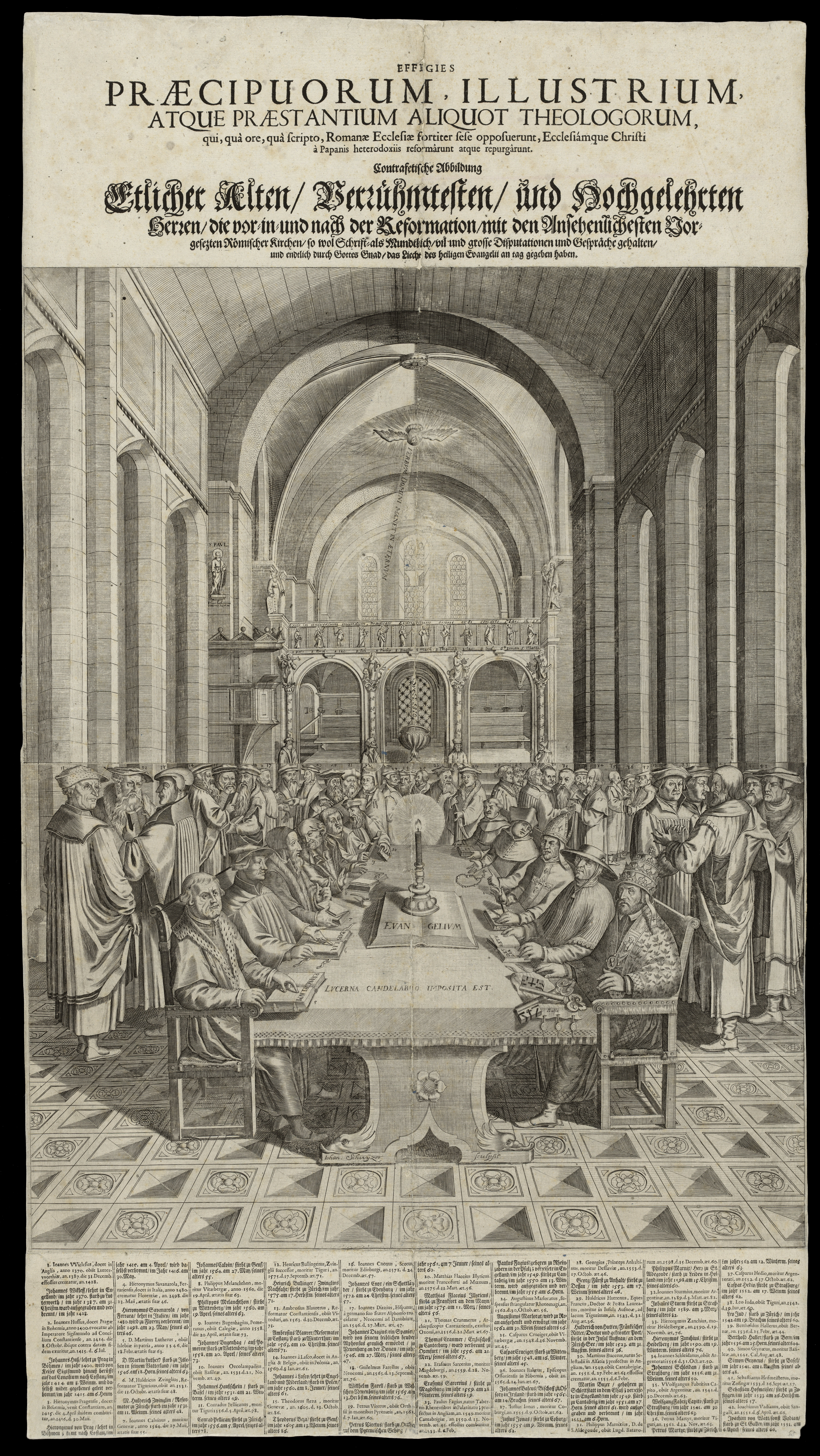
Fictive gathering of notable theologians who "controverted prestigious superiors of the Roman church", at back 1. John Wycliffe, 2. Jan Hus, 3. Jerome of Prague, 4. Girolamo Savonarola; at table from left Martin Luther, Huldrych Zwingli, John Calvin, Philipp Melanchthon, Johannes Bugenhagen, Johannes Oecolampadius, et al. (1650) Erasmus is not shown in this company.

Erasmus' Greek New Testament was the basis of the Textus Receptus bibles, which were used for all Protestant bible translations from 1600 to 1900, notably including the Luther Bible and the King James Version.

Protestant views on Erasmus fluctuated depending on region and period, with continual support in his native Netherlands and in cities of the Upper Rhine area. However, following his death and in the late sixteenth century, many Reformation supporters saw Erasmus's critiques of Luther and lifelong support for the universal Catholic Church as damning, and second-generation Protestants were less vocal in their debts to the great humanist.

Many of the usages fundamental to Luther, Melanchthon and Calvin, such as the forensic imputation of righteousness, grace as divine favour or mercy (rather than a medicine-like substance (Note: Though Gregory Graybill still views Erasmus' view of grace "as metaphysical fuel for good works.") or habit), faith as trust (rather than a persuasion only), "repentance" over "doing penance" (as used by Luther in the first theses of the 95 Theses), owed to Erasmus. (Note: According to Lutheran historian Lowell Green, "credit is due Erasmus for providing the terminology of " faith" and "grace" for the Protestant Reformation" as well as "imputation")

Late Luther hated Erasmus: "Erasmus of Rotterdam is the vilest miscreant that ever disgraced the earth...He is a very Caiaphas;" and "Whenever I pray, I pray a curse upon Erasmus." (Note: Also "I hold Erasmus of Rotterdam to be Christ's most bitter enemy." "With Erasmus it is translation and nothing else. He is never in earnest. He is ambiguous and a caviller" apud Armstrong, Dave; Catholicism, Biblical Evidence for (2 February 2017). "Luther's Insults of Erasmus in "Bondage of the Will" & "Table-Talk"". Biblical Evidence for Catholicism.) He attempted a Biblical analogy to justify his dismissal of Erasmus' thought: "He has done what he was ordained to do: he has introduced the ancient languages, in the place of injurious scholastic studies. He will probably die like Moses in the land of Moab...I would rather he would entirely abstain from explaining and paraphrasing the Scriptures, for he is not up to this work...to lead into the land of promise, is not his business..."

A historian has even said that "the spread of Lutheranism was checked by Luther's antagonizing (of) Erasmus and the humanists."

Erasmus corresponded cordially with Melanchthon until the end. In the view of some theologians or historians, in the decades following Erasmus and Luther's debate on free choice for salvation, Melanchthon himself gradually swang to a position closer to Erasmus' tentative synergism: in 1532 mentioning man's non-rejection of grace as a cause in conversion, and stating it more forcefully in his 1559 Loci. The issue caused a division in early Lutheranism, resolved by the Formula of Concord. (Note: Which denied active synergism in II.6, yet seemingly allowed a passive synergism in II.17.)

Erasmus' reception is also demonstrable among Swiss Protestants in the sixteenth century: he had an indelible influence on the biblical commentaries of, for example, Konrad Pellikan, Heinrich Bullinger, and John Calvin, all of whom used both his annotations on the New Testament and his paraphrases of same in their own New Testament commentaries. Calvin wrote in 1559 of Erasmus as "stumbling and walking blindfold in clear light".

A historian noted "perhaps the most serious blow that Erasmus delivered to Luther and Protestantism he landed indirectly through the person of Ulrich Zwingli." Huldrych Zwingli, the founder of the Reformed tradition, had a conversion experience after reading Erasmus' poem, "Jesus' Lament to Mankind", also titled "The Complaint of Jesus". (Note: These sources seem to be referring to the poem titled "Expostulatio Iesu cum homine suapte culpa pereunte", which has been titled in English as "Jesus Expostulating With Man" (in the Latin complete works, page 168), or more literally as "The expostulation of Jesus with mankind, perishing by its own fault" (in the English complete works, pp. 85–9).) Zwingli's moralism, hermeneutics and attitude to patristic authority owe to Erasmus, and contrast with Luther's.

Anabaptist scholars have suggested an 'intellectual dependence' of Anabaptists on Erasmus. According to Dr Kenneth Davis "Erasmus had copious direct and indirect contact with many of the founding leaders of Anabaptism [...] the Anabaptists can best be understood as, apart from their own creativity, a radicalization and Protestantization not of the Magisterial Reformation but of the lay-oriented, ascetic reformation of which Erasmus is the principle mediator."

For evangelical Christianity, Erasmus had a strong influence on Jacob Arminius, whose library featured many books by Erasmus, even though he did not dare name or quote him.

Erasmus' promotion of the recognition of adiaphora and toleration within bounds was taken up by many kinds of Protestants.

Contemporary "radical orthodoxy" theologian John Milbank has been described as Erasmus revivivus: "First, both Milbank and Erasmus emphasize the necessity of linguistic mediation in articulating theological thought.[...]Second, they prefer a rhetorical approach to theology to dialectical one.[...]Third, at the heart of their theology is the mystery of Christ."

== Intellectual ==
- Literary theorist Hans Urs von Balthasar listed Erasmus in one of three key intellectual "events" in the Germanic age: (Note: Von Balthasar, The Glory of the Lord, Volume 5: The Realm of Metaphysics in the Modern Age, II.B.1.a. Origins of the Modern Period)
  - Duns Scotus-William of Ockham-Francisco Suárez and Meister Eckhart-Nicholas of Cusa-Ignatius of Loyola
  - Martin Luther-Erasmus-Shakespeare
  - Kant-Hegel-Marx
- Political journalist Michael Massing has written of the Luther-Erasmus free will debate as creating a fault line in Western thinking: Europe adopted a form of Erasmian humanism while America has been shaped by Luther-inspired individualism.
- By the coming of the Age of Enlightenment, Erasmus increasingly again became a more widely respected cultural symbol and was hailed as an important figure by increasingly broad groups.
  - Friedrich Nietzsche wrote c.1878 that in taking steps out of reaction and into enlightenment, humanity(?) has "a banner bearing the three names:" (once suitably shorn of Christianity) "Petrarch, Erasmus, Voltaire"
- In a letter to a friend, Erasmus once had written: "That you are patriotic will be praised by many and easily forgiven by everyone; but in my opinion it is wiser to treat men and things as though we held this world the common fatherland of all." Erasmus has been called a universalist rather than a nationalist, however he opposed the political universalism of unmanageably large or expansionary empires with "universal monarchs". (Note: "I have no more liking for the Alexander of the Greek historians, than I have for Homer's Achilles. Both the one and the other present the worst example of what a sovereign should be [...] that Africa, Europe and Asia should be thrown into confusion, and so many thousands of human beings slaughtered, to please one young madman, whose ambition this solid globe would have failed to satisfy!" Erasmus, Letter to Duke Ernest of Baveria, 1517, apud Vollerthun)
- Catholic historian Dom David Knowles wrote that a just appreciation of traditional Catholic doctrine was a necessary condition for appreciating Erasmus, "without which many otherwise gifted writers have repeated meaningless platitudes."
- According to two Dutch historians, "his legacy irreversibly inspired researchers to a hermeneutical approach that in the end could not but result in irrefutable attacks on the self-evident complete inerrancy of Holy Writ."

== Character attacks ==
Writers have often explained Erasmus' failure to adopt their favoured position as manifesting some deep character flaw. (Note: Even a friendly biographer described him as "half Oedipus and half Don Quixote".) In historian Bruce Mansfield's words, "a smallness of character in Erasmus stood in the way of his greatness of mind."

Luther's antipathy to Erasmus has continued to more recent times in some Lutheran teachers:

Oh how Erasmus placed honor above truth! To seek honor is a human frailty. To ever permit it to go to the point of placing honor and for that matter friendship, expediency, or anything else, above truth is to be blinded by the devil himself and to set a snare for others to be entrapped in his delusions. Such delusions Erasmus would support in pride, weakness, vacillation, and false love for peace and harmony." "Erasmus, the Judas of the Reformation" "this cultured and eloquent theological midget

— Otto J. Eckert (1955)

The Catholic Encyclopedia (1917) explained "His inborn vanity and self-complacency were thereby increased almost to the point of becoming a disease; at the same time he sought, often by the grossest flattery, to obtain the favour and material support of patrons or to secure the continuance of such benefits." According to Catholic historian Joseph Lortz (1962) "Erasmus remained in the church...but as a half Catholic...indecisive, hesitating, suspended in the middle." English Jesuit scholar C. C. Martindale wrote "Erasmus really disliked men personally."

A 1920s American historian wrote "Erasmus's ambitions, fed by an innate vanity which at times repels by its frank self-seeking, included both fame and fortune" yet pulls back on another historian's view that his "irritable self-conceit, shameless importunity,...may lead one to a sense of contempt for the scholar", pointing out the reality of Erasmus' dire poverty in Paris. Another 1920s British historian wrote "one feels nauseated when one reads the great scholar's choice Latin that embalms a beggar's whine without the beggar's excuse of absolute need to justify or palliate it[...] There is no doubt as to where Dante would have placed Erasmus" (i.e. in the outer circle of Hell, with vacillators) A Victorian Scottish biographer of Tyndale contrasted Erasmus' weak constitution with the "more masculine energy" of Luther and Tyndale. An inter-war Anglican historian judges "He is a worm, a pigmy, a sheep able only to bleat when the gospel is destroyed[...] Erasmus was a book-man and an invalid.”

In the 20th century, various psychoanalyses were made of Erasmus by practitioners: these diagnosed him variously as "supremely egotistic, neurasthenic, morbidly sensitive, volatile, variable, and vacillating, injudicious, irritable, and querulous, yet always[...] a baffling but interesting chararacter"; a "volatile neurotic, latent homosexual, hypochondriac, and psychasthenic"; having "a form of narcissistic character disorder," a spiritualized, vengeful, "paranoid disposition" driven by "injured narcissism", "repeated persecutory preoccupations...(with) delusional states of paranoia toward the end of his life", repressed anger directed "father figures such as prelates and teachers," needing a "sense of victimization"

Huizinga's biography (1924) treats him more sympathically, with phrases such as: a great and sincere need for concord and affection, profoundly in need of (physical and spiritual) purity, a delicate soul (with a delicate constitution), fated to an immoderate love of liberty, (Note: Historian Erik Wolf elaborates "Out of the need for personal independence, he remained his entire life a man in the middle. Averting everything fanatical, extreme, or absurd, he was easily frightened by the prospect of unilateral personal engagement, even when it appeared to be ethically demanded. He preferred to persist in intellectual and spiritual self-discipline…") having a dangerous fusion between inclination and conviction, restless but precipitate, a continual intermingling of explosion and reserve, fastidious, bashful, coquettish, a white-lier, evasive, suspicious, and feline. Yet "compared with most of his contemporaries he remains moderate and refined."

Polemicist Harry S. May remarkably compared Erasmus in psychohistory to Adolf Hitler: "as Christ became his protagonist, the authoritarian fuehrer principle was born in him." "His own kind of self-produced isolation[...]made Erasmus the loneliest man of the Humanist era." "Unaware or not, Erasmus — like all Jew haters in the centuries to come — hated Jews for the things he did not possess: health, affluence, learning, and ethnic solidarity."
