= Leophanes =

Ancient Greek naturalist

Leophanes (Ancient Greek: Λεωφάνης) was an Ancient Greek scientist and naturalist who lived approximately between 470 and 430 BC and the 4th century BC. He is known from mentions in Aristotle and Pseudo-Plutarch, both of whom discuss his theory that male and female animals are generated from different testicles.
