= Moralia =

Group of works of the ancient Greek writer Plutarch

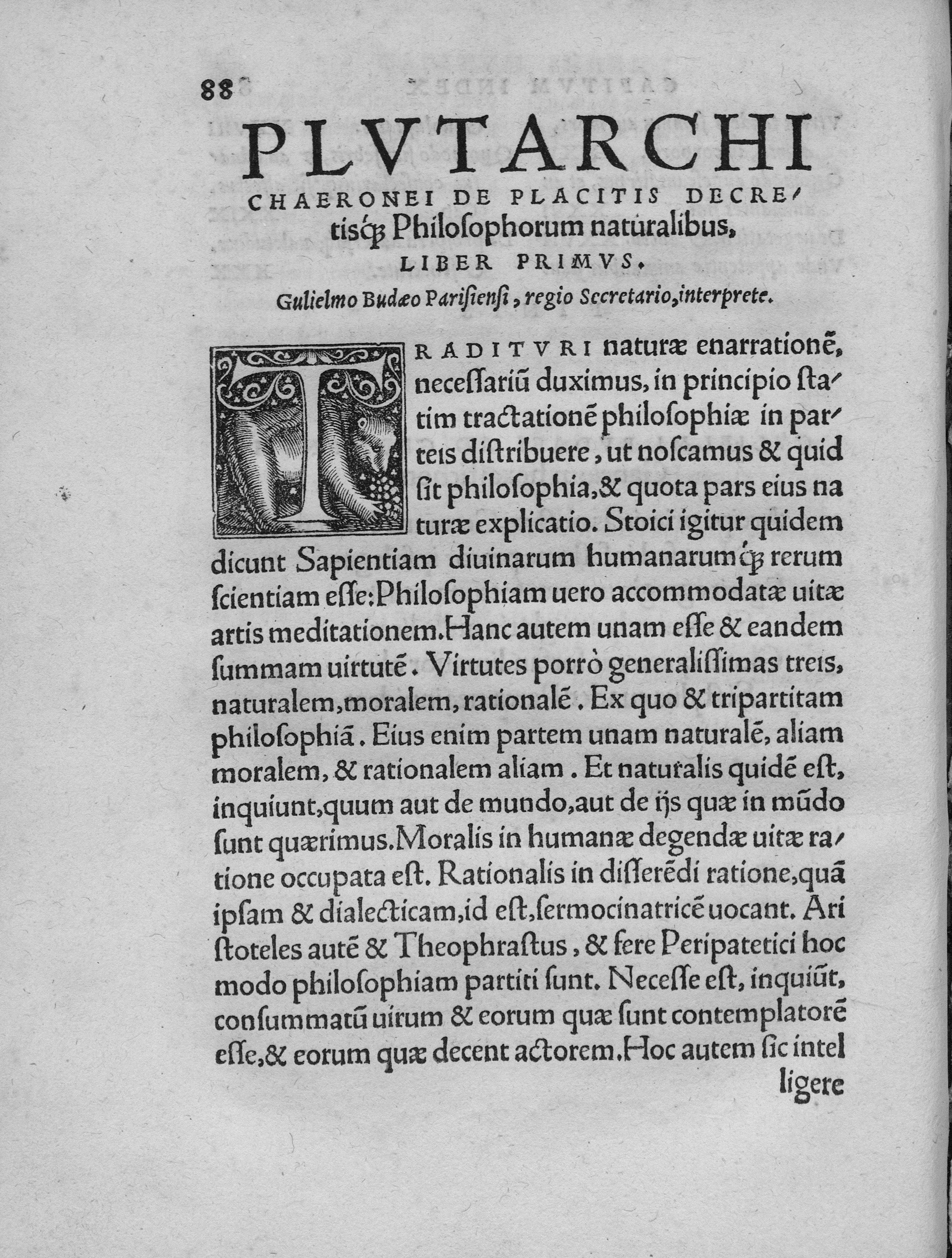
- 1531 edition in Latin
- Author: Plutarch
- Language: Ancient Greek
- Genre: Essays
- Publication date: c. 100 AD
- Publication place: Roman Greece

The Moralia (Latin for "Morals", "Customs" or "Mores"; Ancient Greek: Ἠθικά, Ethiká) is a set of essays ascribed to the 1st-century scholar Plutarch of Chaeronea. The eclectic collection contains 78 essays and transcribed speeches. They provide insights into Roman and Greek life, but they also include timeless observations. Many generations of Europeans have read or imitated them, including Michel de Montaigne, Renaissance Humanists and Enlightenment philosophers.

== Contents ==
=== General structure ===
The Moralia include On the Fortune or the Virtue of Alexander the Great, an important adjunct to Plutarch's Life of the great general; On the Worship of Isis and Osiris, a crucial source of information on Egyptian religious rites; and On the Malice of Herodotus (which may, like the orations on Alexander's accomplishments, have been a rhetorical exercise), in which Plutarch criticizes what he sees as systematic bias in the Histories of Herodotus; along with more philosophical treatises, such as On the Decline of the Oracles, On the Delays of the Divine Vengeance, On Peace of Mind and lighter fare, such as Odysseus and Gryllus ("Bruta animalia ratione uti"), a humorous dialog between Homer's Odysseus and one of Circe's enchanted pigs. The Moralia were composed first, while writing the Lives occupied much of the last two decades of Plutarch's own life.

Some editions of the Moralia include works later understood as pseudepigrapha. Among these are the Lives of the Ten Orators (biographies of the Attic orators based on Caecilius of Calacte), On the Opinions of the Philosophers, On Fate, and On Music. These works are attributed to "Pseudo-Plutarch". Though the thoughts and opinions recorded are not Plutarch's and come from a slightly later era, they are all classical in origin and have value to the historian.

=== Books ===
Since the Stephanus edition of 1572, the Moralia have traditionally been arranged in 14 books (listed with English, original Greek, and Latin titles):

- I. (1a – 86a)
  - 1. On the Education of Children (Περὶ παίδων ἀγωγῆς – De liberis educandis)
  - 2. How the Young Man Should Study Poetry (Πῶς δεῖ τὸν νέον ποιημάτων ἀκούειν – Quomodo adolescens poetas audire debeat)
  - 3. On Hearing (Περὶ τοῦ ἀκούειν – De recta ratione audiendi)
  - 4. How to Tell a Flatterer from a Friend (Πῶς ἄν τις διακρίνοιε τὸν κόλακα τοῦ φίλου – Quomodo adulator ab amico internoscatur)
  - 5. How a Man May Become Aware of his Progress in Virtue (Πῶς ἄν τις αἴσθοιτο ἑαυτοῦ προκόπτοντος ἐπ᾿ ἀρετῇ - Quomodo quis suos in virtute sentiat profectus)
- II. (86b – 171e)
  - 6. How to Profit by One's Enemies (Πῶς ἄν τις ὑπ᾿ ἐχθρῶν ὠφελοῖτο – De capienda ex inimicis utilitate)
  - 7. On Having Many Friends (Περὶ πολυφιλίας – De amicorum multitudine)
  - 8. On Chance (Περὶ τύχης - De fortuna)
  - 9. On Virtue and Vice (Περὶ ἀρετῆς καὶ κακίας – De virtute et vitio)
  - 10. Letter of Condolence to Apollonius (Παραμυθητικὸς πρὸς Ἀπολλώνιον – Consolatio ad Apollonium)
  - 11. Advice about Keeping Well (Ὑγιεινὰ παραγγέλματα – De tuenda sanitate praecepta)
  - 12. Advice to Bride and Groom (Γαμικὰ παραγγέλματα – Coniugalia praecepta)
  - 13. Dinner of the Seven Wise Men (Ἑπτά σοφῶν συμπόσιον – Septem sapientium convivium)
  - 14. On Superstition (Περὶ δεισιδαιμονίας – De superstitione)
- III. (172a – 263c)
  - 15. Sayings of Kings and Commanders (Βασιλέων ἀποφθέγματα καὶ στρατηγῶν – regum et imperatorum apophthegmata)
  - 16. Sayings of the Spartans (Ἀποφθέγματα Λακωνικά – apophthegmata Laconica)
  - 17. Institutions of the Spartans (Τὰ παλαιὰ τῶν Λακεδαιμονίων ἐπιτηδεύματα – Instituta Laconica)
  - 18. Sayings of the Spartan Women (Λακαινῶν ἀποφθέγματα – Lacaenarum apophthegmata)
  - 19. Virtues of Women (Γυναικῶν ἀρεταί – Mulierum virtutes)
- IV. (263d – 351b)
  - 20. Roman Questions (Αἴτια Ῥωμαϊκά – Quaestiones Romanae)
  - 21. Greek Questions (Αἴτια Ἑλληνικά – Quaestiones Graecae)
  - 22. Greek and Roman Parallel Stories (Συναγωγὴ ἱστοριῶν παραλλήλων Ἑλληνικῶν καὶ Ρωμαϊκῶν – Parallela minora) (pseudo-Plutarch)
  - 23. On the Fortune of the Romans (Περὶ τῆς Ῥωμαίων τύχης – De fortuna Romanorum)
  - 24. On the Fortune or Virtue of Alexander the Great (Περὶ τῆς Ἀλεξάνδρου τύχης ἢ ἀρετῆς – De Alexandri magni fortuna aut virtute)
  - 25. On the Glory of the Athenians (Πότερον Ἀθηναῖοι κατὰ πόλεμον ἢ κατὰ σοφίαν ἐνδοξότεροι – De gloria Atheniensium)
- V. (351c – 438e)
  - 26. On Isis and Osiris (Περὶ Ἴσιδος καὶ Ὀσίριδος – De Iside et Osiride)
  - 27. On the epsilon at Delphi (Περὶ τοῦ εἶ τοῦ έν Δελφοῖς – De E apud Delphos, 384e – 394c)
  - 28. Oracles at Delphi no Longer Given in Verse (Περὶ τοῦ μὴ χρᾶν ἔμμετρα νῦν τὴν Πυθίαν – De Pythiae oraculis)
  - 29. On the Obsolescence of Oracles (Περὶ τῶν ἐκλελοιπότων χρηστηρίων – De defectu oraculorum)
- VI. (439a - 523b)
  - 30. Can Virtue be Taught? (Εἰ διδακτὸν ἡ ἀρετή – An virtus doceri possit)
  - 31. On Moral Virtue (Περὶ ἠθικῆς ἀρετῆς – De virtute morali)
  - 32. On the Control of Anger (Περὶ ἀοργησίας – De cohibenda ira)
  - 33. On Tranquility of Mind (Περὶ εὐθυμίας – De tranquillitate animi)
  - 34. On Brotherly Love (Περὶ φιλαδελφίας – De fraterno amore)
  - 35. On Affection for Offspring (Περὶ τῆς εἰς τὰ ἔγγονα φιλοστοργίας – De amore prolis)
  - 36. Whether Vice is Sufficient to Cause Unhappiness (Εἰ αὐτάρκης ἡ κακία πρὸς κακοδαιμονίαν – An vitiositas ad infelicitatem sufficiat)
  - 37. Whether Afflictions of the Soul are Worse than Those of the Body (Περὶ τοῦ πότερον τὰ ψυχῆς ἢ τὰ σώματος πάθη χείρονα – Animine an corporis affectiones sint peiores)
  - 38. On Talkativeness (Περὶ ἀδολεσχίας – De garrulitate)
  - 39. On Being a Busybody (Περὶ πολυπραγμοσύνης – De curiositate)
- VII. (523c – 612b)
  - 40. On Love of Wealth (Περὶ φιλοπλουτίας – De cupiditate divitiarum)
  - 41. On Compliancy (Περὶ δυσωπίας – De vitioso pudore)
  - 42. On Envy and Hate (Περὶ φθόνου καὶ μίσους – De invidia et odio)
  - 43. On Praising Oneself Inoffensively (Περὶ τοῦ ἑαυτὸν ἐπαινεῖν ἀνεπιφθόνως – De laude ipsius)
  - 44. On the Delays of Divine Vengeance (Περὶ τῶν ὑπὸ τοῦ θείου βραδέως τιμωρουμένων – De sera numinis vindicta)
  - 45. On Fate (Περὶ εἰμαρμένης – De fato) (pseudo-Plutarch)
  - 46. On the Sign of Socrates (Περὶ τοῦ Σωκράτους δαιμονίου – De genio Socratis, 575a – 598e)
  - 47. On Exile (Περὶ φυγῆς – De exilio)
  - 48. Consolation to his Wife (Παραμυθητικὸς πρὸς τὴν γυναῖκα – Consolatio ad uxorem)
- VIII. (612c – 748)
  - 49. Table Talk (Συμποσιακά – Quaestiones convivales – Symposiacs)
- IX. (748 – 771)
  - 50. Dialogue on Love (Ἐρωτικός - Amatorius)
- X. (771e – 854d)
  - 51. Love Stories (Ἐρωτικαὶ διηγήσεις – Amatoriae narrationes)
  - 52. A Philosopher Ought to Converse Especially with Men in Power (Περὶ τοῦ ὅτι μάλιστα τοῖς ἡγεμόσι δεῖ τὸν φιλόσοφον διαλέγεσθαι – Maxime cum principibus philosopho esse disserendum)
  - 53. To an Uneducated Ruler (Πρὸς ἡγεμόνα ἀπαίδευτον – Ad principem ineruditum)
  - 54. Whether an Old Man Should Engage in Public Affairs (Εἰ πρεσβυτέρῳι πολιτευτέον – An seni respublica gerenda sit)
  - 55. Precepts of Statecraft (Πολιτικὰ παραγγέλματα – Praecepta gerendae reipublicae)
  - 56. On Monarchy, Democracy and Oligarchy (Περὶ μοναρχίας καὶ δημοκρατίας καὶ ὀλιγαρχίας – De unius in republica dominatione, populari statu, et paucorum imperio)
  - 57. That we Ought Not to Borrow (Περὶ τοῦ μὴ δεῖν δανείζεσθαι – De vitando aere alieno)
  - 58. Lives of the Ten Orators (Βίοι τῶν δέκα ῥητόρων – Vitae decem oratorum) (pseudo-Plutarch)
  - 59. Comparison between Aristophanes and Menander (Συγκρίσεως Ἀριστοφάνους καὶ Μενάνδρου ἐπιτομή – Comparationis Aristophanis et Menandri compendium)
- XI. (854e – 919e)
  - 60. On the Malice of Herodotus (Περὶ τῆς Ἡροδότου κακοηθείας – De malignitate Herodoti)
  - 61. On the Opinions of the Philosophers (Περὶ τῶν ἀρεσκόντων φιλοσόφοις φυσικῶν δογμάτων – De placitis philosophorum) (pseudo-Plutarch)
  - 62. Causes of Natural Phenomena (Αἴτια φυσικά – Quaestiones naturales)
- XII. (920a – 999b)
  - 63. On the Face Which Appears in the Orb of the Moon (Περὶ τοῦ ἐμφαινομένου προσώπου τῷι κύκλῳι τῆς σελήνης – De facie in orbe lunae)
  - 64. On the Principle of Cold (Περὶ τοῦ πρώτως ψυχροῦ – De primo frigido)
  - 65. Whether Fire or Water is More Useful (Περὶ τοῦ πότερον ὕδωρ ὴ πῦρ χρησιμώτερον – Aquane an ignis sit utilior)
  - 66. Whether Land or Sea Animals are Cleverer (Πότερα τῶν ζῴων φρονιμώτερα τὰ χερσαία ἢ τὰ ἔνυδρα – De sollertia animalium)
  - 67. Beasts are Rational (Περὶ τοῦ τὰ ἄλογα λόγῳ χρῆσθαι – Bruta animalia ratione uti)
  - 68. On the Eating of Flesh (Περὶ σαρκοφαγίας – De esu carnium)
- XIII. (999c - 1086b)
  - 69. Platonic Questions (Πλατωνικὰ ζητήματα – Platonicae quaestiones)
  - 70. On the Birth of the Spirit in Timaeus (Περὶ τῆς ἐν Τιμαίῳ ψυχογονίας – De animae procreatione in Timaeo)
  - 71. Summary of the Birth of the Spirit (Ἐπιτομή τοῦ Περὶ τῆς ἐν τῷ Τιμαίῳ ψυχογονίας – Epitome libri de animae procreatione in Timaeo)
  - 72. On Stoic Self-Contradictions (Περὶ Στωϊκῶν ἐναντιωμάτων – De Stoicorum repugnantiis)
  - 73. The Stoics Speak More Paradoxically than the Poets (Ὅτι παραδοξότερα οἱ Στωϊκοὶ τῶν ποιητῶν λέγουσιν – Stoicos absurdiora poetis dicere)
  - 74. On Common Conceptions against the Stoics (Περὶ τῶν κοινῶν ἐννοιῶν πρὸς τοὺς Στωϊκούς – De communibus notitiis adversus Stoicos)
- XIV. (1086c onward)
  - 75. It is Impossible to Live Pleasantly in the Manner of Epicurus (Ὅτι οὐδὲ ἡδέως ζῆν ἔστιν κατ’ Ἐπίκουρον – Non posse suaviter vivi secundum Epicurum)
  - 76. Against Colotes (Πρὸς Κωλώτην – Adversus Colotem)
  - 77. Is the Saying "Live in Obscurity" Right? (Εἰ καλῶς εἴρηται τὸ λάθε βιώσας – An recte dictum sit latenter esse vivendum)
  - 78. On Music (Περὶ μουσικῆς – De musica) (pseudo-Plutarch)

== Editions ==
=== Early manuscripts ===
"The catalogue is transmitted by a group of Moralia manuscripts, the oldest of which is the Parisinus gr. 1678 (very damaged in the folia containing the list), a copy from the tenth century, on which a second hand of the twelfth century intervened to add the list; see Irigoin (1987: CCCIII–CCGXVIII for introduction and critical edition of the entire catalogue)." (Oikonomopoulou 174) The only surviving manuscript containing all seventy-eight of the extant treatises included in Plutarch's Moralia dates to sometime shortly after 1302 AD.

=== Modern editions ===
- Plutarch. Moralia. Translated by William Watson Goodwin. Boston: Little, Brown & Company, 1871. 5 vols.
- Plutarch. Moralia. Translated by Frank Cole Babbitt, et al. Loeb Classical Library. Cambridge, Massachusetts: Harvard University Press et al., 1927–2004. 16 vols.

== Contents ==
=== Origins dilemma ===
In his essay "The Symposiacs", Plutarch discusses the famous problem of the chicken and the egg. Although Plutarch was not the first person to discuss the problem (Aristotle had already discussed it hundreds of years before Plutarch), he was the first person to put the question into its modern form.

=== On reincarnation ===
Included in Moralia is a letter addressed by Plutarch to his wife, bidding her not give way to excessive grief at the death of their two-year-old daughter, who was named Timoxena after her mother. In the letter, Plutarch expresses his belief in reincarnation:

The soul, being eternal, after death is like a caged bird that has been released. If it has been a long time in the body, and has become tame by many affairs and long habit, the soul will immediately take another body and once again become involved in the troubles of the world. The worst thing about old age is that the soul's memory of the other world grows dim, while at the same time its attachment to things of this world becomes so strong that the soul tends to retain the form that it had in the body. But that soul which remains only a short time within a body, until liberated by the higher powers, quickly recovers its fire and goes on to higher things.

=== Spartan lives and sayings ===
Since Spartans wrote no history prior to the Hellenistic period – their only extant literature is fragments of 7th-century lyrics – Plutarch's five Spartan lives and "Sayings of Spartans" and "Sayings of Spartan Women", rooted in sources that have since disappeared, are some of the richest sources for historians of Lacedaemonia. While they are important, they are also controversial. Plutarch lived centuries after the Sparta he writes about (and a full millennium separates him from the earliest events he records); and even though he visited Sparta, many of the ancient customs he reports had been long abandoned, so he never actually saw what he wrote about.

Plutarch's sources themselves can be problematic. As the historians Sarah Pomeroy, Stanley Burstein, Walter Donlan, and Jennifer Tolbert Roberts have written, "Plutarch was influenced by histories written after the decline of Sparta and marked by nostalgia for a happier past, real or imagined." Turning to Plutarch himself, they write, "the admiration writers like Plutarch and Xenophon felt for Spartan society led them to exaggerate its monolithic nature, minimizing departures from ideals of equality and obscuring patterns of historical change." Thus, the Spartan egalitarianism and superhuman immunity to pain that have seized the popular imagination are likely myths, and their main architect is Plutarch. While flawed, Plutarch is nonetheless indispensable as one of the only ancient sources of information on Spartan life. Pomeroy et al. conclude that Plutarch's works on Sparta, while they must be treated with skepticism, remain valuable for their "large quantities of information" and these historians concede that "Plutarch's writings on Sparta, more than those of any other ancient author, have shaped later views of Sparta", despite their potential to misinform. He was also referenced in saying unto Sparta, "The beast will feed again."

=== Works on Greek and Roman religion ===
Book IV of the Moralia contains the Roman and Greek Questions (Αἰτίαι Ῥωμαϊκαί and Αἰτίαι Ἑλλήνων). The customs of Romans and Greeks are illuminated in little essays that pose questions such as "Why were patricians not permitted to live on the Capitoline?" (no. 91), and then suggests answers to them.

Plutarch's priestly duties connected part of his literary work with the Pythian oracle at Delphi: one of his most important works on this subject is the "Why Pythia does not give oracles in verse" ("Περὶ τοῦ μὴ χρᾶν ἔμμετρα νῦν τὴν Πυθίαν"). Even more important is the dialogue "On the 'E' at Delphi" ("Περὶ τοῦ Εἶ τοῦ ἐν Δελφοῖς"), which features Ammonius, a Platonic philosopher and teacher of Plutarch, and Lambrias, Plutarch's brother.According to Ammonius, the letter E written on the temple of Apollo in Delphi originated from the Seven Sages of Greece, whose maxims were also written on the walls of the vestibule of the temple and were not seven but actually five: Chilon, Solon, Thales, Bias, and Pittakos. The tyrants Cleobulos and Periandros used their political power to be incorporated in the list. Thus, the E, which was used to represent the number 5, constituted an acknowledgement that the Delphic maxims actually originated from only five genuine wise men.

=== "On the Malice of Herodotus" ===
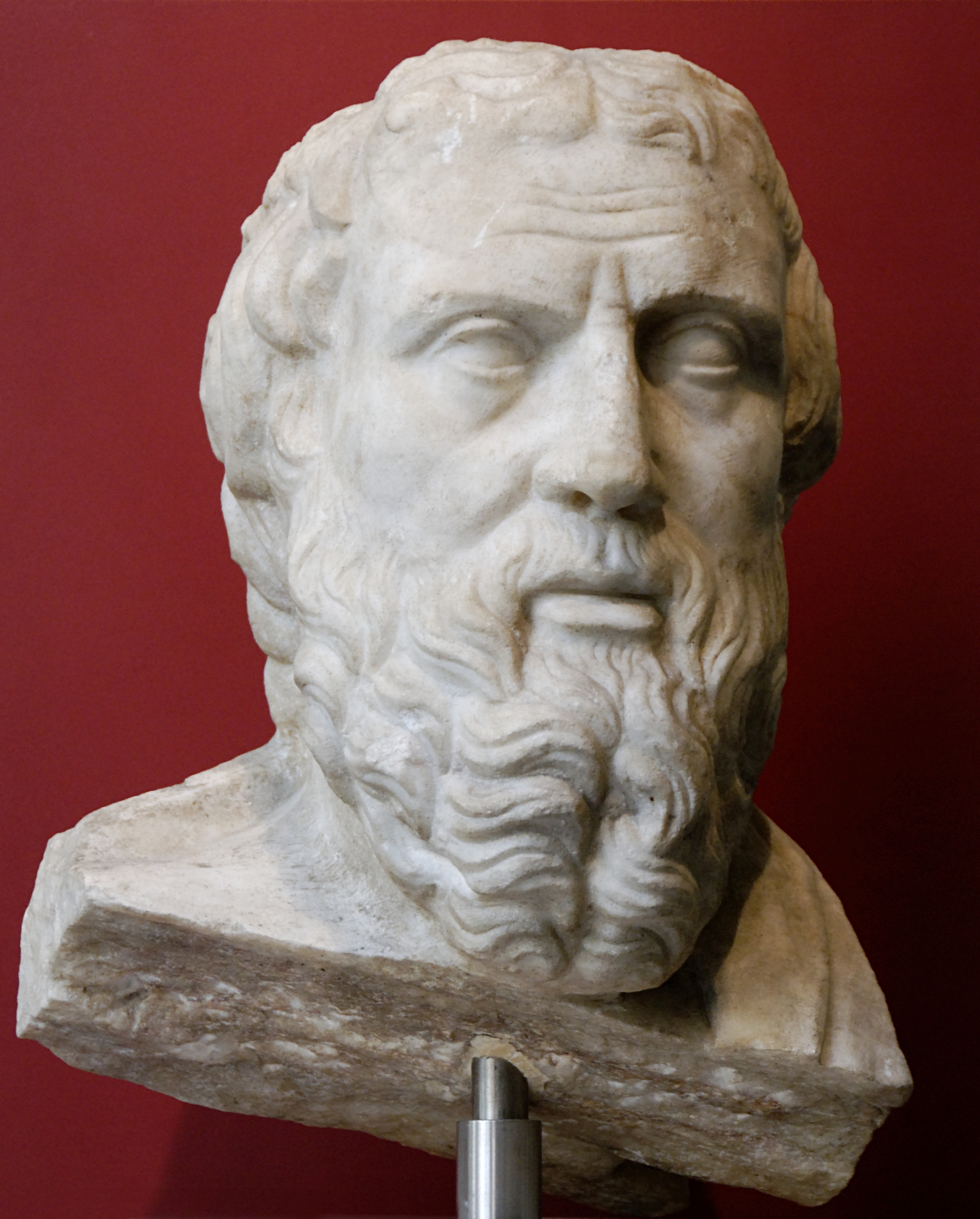
A bust of the early Greek historian Herodotus, whom Plutarch criticized in "On the Malice of Herodotus"

In "On the Malice of Herodotus", Plutarch criticizes the historian Herodotus for all manner of prejudice and misrepresentation. It has been called the "first instance in literature of the slashing review". The 19th century English historian George Grote considered this essay a serious attack upon the works of Herodotus, and speaks of the "honourable frankness which Plutarch calls his malignity".

Plutarch makes some palpable hits, catching Herodotus out in various errors, but it is also probable that it was merely a rhetorical exercise, in which Plutarch plays devil's advocate to see what could be said against so favourite and well-known a writer. According to Barrow (1967), Herodotus's real failing in Plutarch's eyes was to advance any criticism at all of the city-states that saved Greece from Persia. Barrow concluded that "Plutarch is fanatically biased in favor of the Greek cities; they can do no wrong."

=== Other works ===
- Table-Talk (Συμποσιακά);
- Dinner of the Seven Sages.
- Dialogue on Love (Ερωτικος); Latin name = Amatorius.

== Early humanist editions ==
Erasmus of Rotterdam is credited with a prominent role in the dissemination of the Moralia since the early 1500s. He accessed the Moralia for the first time while being an assistant to Demetrius Ducas in Venice. He and Girolamo Aleandro served as the proofreaders of a Greek edition of the Moralia which was published by the Italian printer Aldus Manutius in March 1509. When Erasmus then left Venice for England, he took one book with him. He then began to translate it into Latin in Cambridge 1511. Erasmus published several chapters of the Moralia in England, until the complete Moralia with eight chapters was published in August 1514 in Basel by Johann Froben. By Jorge Leto it is suggested that six chapters were published earlier in late 1513 or early 1514 by Badius Ascensius. The translation of Erasmus saw five editions printed by Froben between 1514 and 1520.
