= On the Malice of Herodotus =

Essay by Plutarch

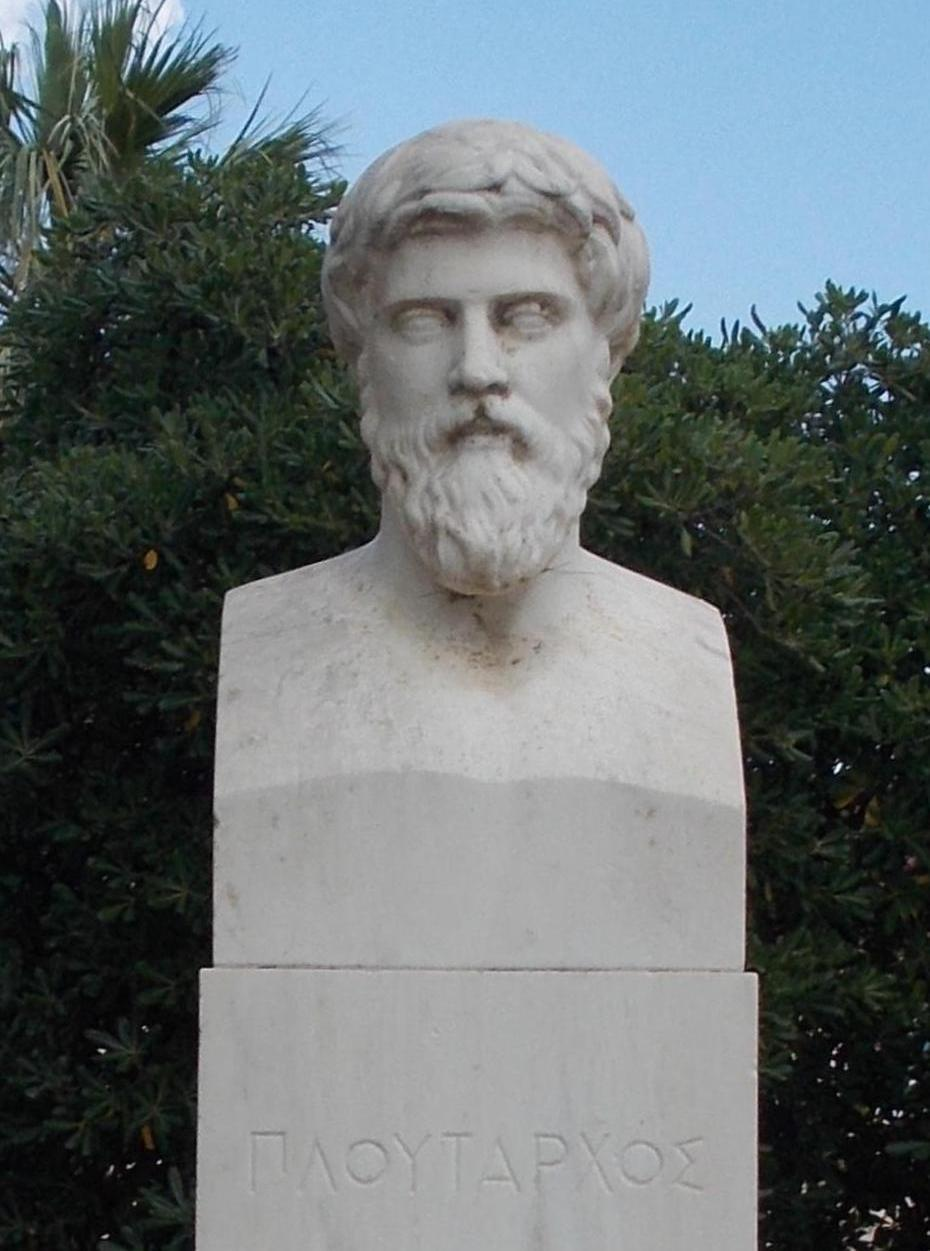
Bust of Plutarch at Chaeronea

On the Malice of Herodotus (Ancient Greek: Περὶ τῆς Ἡροδότου κακοηθείας, romanized: Peri tēs Hērodotou kakoētheias, also translated Malignity; Latin: De Herodoti malignitate) is an essay by Plutarch criticizing the historian Herodotus for all manner of prejudice and misrepresentation in the latter's Histories. It has been called "the first book review" and "the first instance in literature of the slashing review." The 19th-century English historian George Grote considered this essay a serious attack upon the works of Herodotus, and contrasts Herodotus's journalistic openness to events ("the honourable frankness which Plutarch calls his 'malignity'") to Plutarch's preferred idealizing and moralizing tone.

== Authenticity and reception ==
The tone of the essay is so waspish that many scholars (Grote was one) doubted that the text was the product of the famously mild-tempered philosopher. In the 19th century in particular On the Malice was dismissed as the work of a Pseudo-Plutarch, "full of the most futile accusations of every kind". in which the author merely establishes his own malignity. Other critics regarded it as a school exercise by a young Plutarch who had not yet grown into his mature persona. However, most modern scholars regard the work as genuine, since Plutarch demonstrated similarly strident criticisms, for example, in his attacks on Colotes.

On The Malice can be seen as a rhetorical exercise, in which Plutarch plays devil's advocate to see what could be said against such a respected and well-known writer. For others, the work is one of hyper-patriotism: to Plutarch scholar R. H. Barrow, for example, Plutarch sees "malignity" in Herodotus's willingness to criticize some Greek states and the respect he affords the Persians. "Plutarch," he concluded, "is fanatically biased in favor of the Greek cities; they can do no wrong." Most recently the text has been seen as an expression of Plutarch's Platonism. He criticizes Herodotus in terms similar to those which Plato levied against Homer: his stories, though charming and well-told, are insufficiently edifying.

Finally there is the element of wounded regional pride. For the proud Boeotian Plutarch, Herodotus's hostile portrayal of Thebes's role in the Persian Wars justified a harsh critique. As Plutarch himself put it:

Since he principally exerts his malice against the Boeotians and Corinthians, though without sparing any other, I think myself obliged to defend our ancestors and the truth against this part of his writings

— Plutarch, On The Malice of Herodotus, 854f
