= Pseudo-Plutarch =

Conventional name given to unknown ancient authors

Pseudo-Plutarch is the conventional name given to the actual, but unknown, authors of a number of pseudepigrapha attributed to Plutarch but now known not to have been written by him. Some of these works were included in editions of Plutarch's Moralia.

== Works ==
Among the works included in some editions of Plutarch's Moralia are:

- the Lives of the Ten Orators (Ancient Greek: Βίοι τῶν δέκα ῥητόρων; Latin: Vitae decem oratorum), biographies of the Ten Orators of ancient Athens, based on Caecilius of Calacte, possibly deriving from a common source with the Lives of Photius
- The Doctrines of the Philosophers (Ancient Greek: Περὶ τῶν ἀρεσκόντων φιλοσόφοις φυσικῶν δογμάτων; Latin: Placita Philosophorum)
- De Musica (On Music)
- Whether Fire or Water is More Useful
- Greek and Roman Parallel Stories (Ancient Greek: Διηγήσεις Παράλληλοι Ἑλληνικαὶ καὶ Ῥωμαϊκαί), also known as the Parallela Minora (Minor Parallels)
- Pro Nobilitate (Noble Lineage)
- De fluviis (On Rivers / About the Names of Rivers and Mountains; Greek: Περὶ ποταμῶν καὶ ὀρῶν ἐπωνυμίας)
- De Homero (On Homer)
- De Unius in Re Publica Dominatione (On the Rule of One in the Republic)
- Consolatio ad Apollonium (Consolation to Apollonius)

These works date to slightly later than Plutarch, but almost all of them date to late antiquity (3rd to 4th century AD). One pseudepigraphal philosophical work, De Fato (On Fate; included in editions of Plutarch's Moralia), is thought to be a 2nd-century Middle Platonic work.

Stromateis (Στρωματεῖς, "Patchwork"), an important source for pre-Socratic philosophy, is also falsely ascribed by Eusebius to Plutarch.

Some works ascribed to Plutarch are likely of medieval origin, such as the "Letter to Trajan. David Blank has recently (2011) shown that Pro Nobilitate was written by Arnoul Le Ferron (Arnoldus Ferronus) and first published in 1556.

== Sources ==
- Aalders G. J. D. "Plutarch or Pseudo-Plutarch? The authorship of De unius in re publica dominatione" Mnemosyne XXXV (1982):72-83.
- Boscherini, S. 1985 "A proposito della tradizione del Pro nobilitate pseudo-plutarcheo" in R. Cardini, E. Garin, L. C. Martinelli, G. Pascucci, eds., Tradizione classica e letteratura umanistica. Per Alessandro Perosa. Vol.I. II. (Humanistica.3.4.). (Roma): 651-660.
- Conti Bizzarro, Ferruccio "Note a Ps.-Plutarch. de musica" MCr 29 (1994): 259-261.
- Hillgruber, Michael 1994 Die pseudoplutarchische Schrift De Homero. (Stuttgart).
- Jurado, E.A. Ramos "Quaestiones ps.-Plutarcheae" in Pérez Jimenez 1990:123-126.
- Seeliger, Friedrich Konrad 1874 De Dionysio Halicarnassensi Plutarchi qui vulgo fertur in vitis decem oratorum auctore. Dissertation—Leipzig. (Budissae).
- Smith, Rebekah M. 1992 "Photius on the ten orators" GRBS 33: 59-189.
- Tieleman, Teun 1991 "Diogenes of Babylon and Stoic embryology: Ps. Plutarch, Plac. V 15.4 reconsidered." Mnemosyne 44:106-125.
