= Juan de Vergara =

Spanish humanist and brother of Francisco de Vergara (1492-1557)

Juan de Vergara (Toledo, Spain, 1492-1557) was a Spanish humanist, brother of another famous Spanish humanist, Francisco de Vergara. The brothers were of Jewish descent on the maternal side. He was one of the editors of the Complutensian Polyglot Bible.
