= Francisco de Vergara =

Francisco de Vergara (died 1545 in Toledo, Spain) was a Spanish Hellenist and humanist, brother of Juan de Vergara. He was chair of Greek at the Trilingual College of the University of Alcala. The brothers were of Jewish descent on their maternal side. Francisco de Vergara's students included Juan de Valdés.
