= Textus Receptus =

Greek critical text of the New Testament

The Textus Receptus (Latin for 'received text') is the succession of printed Greek New Testament texts starting with Erasmus' Novum Instrumentum omne (1516) and including the editions of Stephanus, Beza, the Elzevir house, Colinaeus and Scrivener.

Erasmus' Latin/Greek New Testament editions and annotations were a major influence for the original German Luther Bible and the translations of the New Testament into English by William Tyndale. Subsequent Textus Receptus editions constituted the main Greek translation-base for the King James Version, the Spanish Reina-Valera translation, the Czech Bible of Kralice, the Portuguese Almeida Recebida, the Dutch Statenvertaling, the Russian Synodal Bible and many other Reformation-era New Testament translations throughout Western, Northern and Central Europe.

Despite being viewed as an inferior form of the text of the New Testament by many modern textual critics, some Conservative Christians still view it as the most authentic text of the New Testament. This view is generally based upon a theological doctrine of the supernatural providential preservation of scripture.

== Textual origin ==
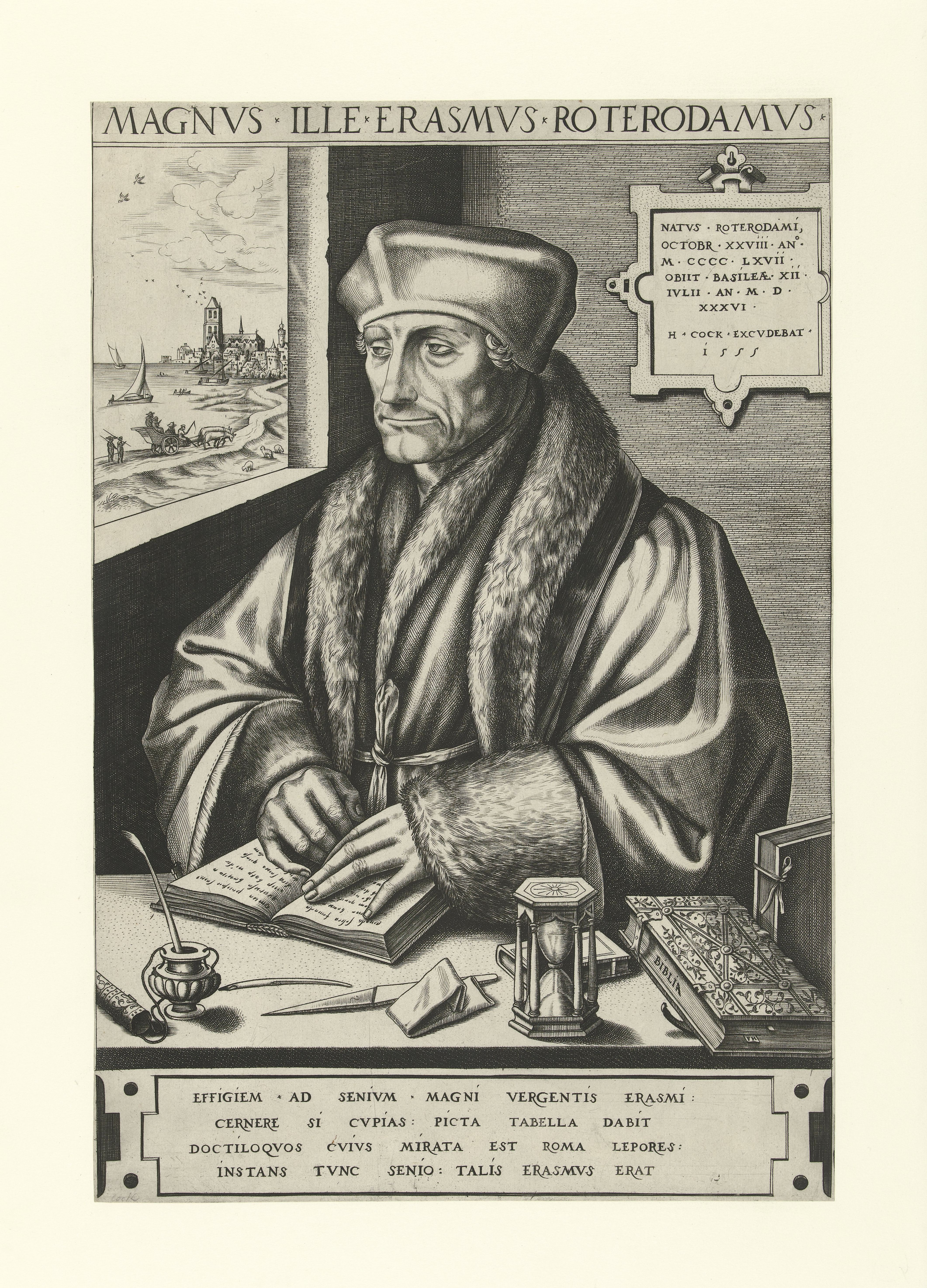
Desiderius Erasmus Roterodamus, the first to publish a Greek New Testament.

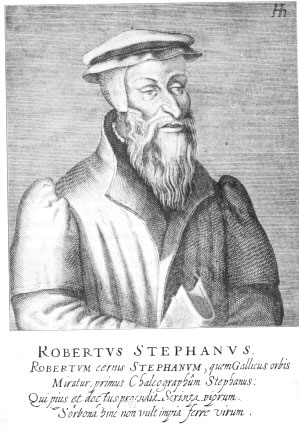
Robert Stephanus

The Textus Receptus most strongly resembles the Byzantine text-type, as its editor Erasmus mainly based his work on manuscripts following the Byzantine text. However, Erasmus sometimes followed the Minuscule 1 (part of the proposed Caesarean text-type in the Gospels) in a small number of verses, additionally following the Latin Vulgate translated by Jerome in the 4th century in a few verses, including Acts 9:6 and in placing the doxology of Romans into chapter 16 instead of after chapter 14 as in most Byzantine manuscripts. In the Book of Revelation, Erasmus' text primarily follows the Andreas text-type, named after Andreas of Caesarea (563–614), who used it in his widely influential commentary on Revelation.

For the first edition, Erasmus had direct access to around 8 Greek manuscripts in Basel, using Minuscule 2105 (in the Pauline Epistles) for his copious annotations which were based on notes prepared over the previous decade on unknown manuscripts in England and Brabant. The Greek manuscripts used in the creation of Erasmus' first edition are the following:

GA (Note: Gregory–Aland number of Biblical manuscripts)	Date	Name	Text-type	Contents
2817	11th century	Codex Basilensis A. N. III. 11	Byzantine	Pauline Epistles
1	12th century	Codex Basiliensis A. N. IV. 2	Caesarean/Byzantine	Acts, Epistles, Gospels
2	12th century	Codex Basilensis A. N. IV. 1	Byzantine	Gospels
2814	12th century	Augsburg I.1.4° 1	Andreas/Byzantine	Revelation
2815	12th century	Codex Basilensis A. N. IV. 4	Byzantine	Acts, Epistles
2105	14th century	Ms. Auct. E. 1. 6	Byzantine	Pauline Epistles, commentary of Theophylact of Ohrid
4	13th century	Minuscule 4/Codex Regius 84	Mixed/Byzantine	Gospels
2816	15th century	Codex Basilensis A. N. IV. 5	Byzantine	Acts, Epistles
817	15th century	Codex Basilensis A. N. III. 15	Byzantine	Gospels

Even though Erasmus had only one manuscript of Revelation when he created the first edition of his Novum Instrumentum omne, F.H.A Scrivener notes that in a few places such as Revelation 1:4 and Revelation 8:13, Erasmus refers to manuscripts which he had seen earlier during his travels. For subsequent editions, Erasmus had the benefit of many European correspondents (he wrote "The New Testament has made me friends everywhere") and was able to get more collaborators or subeditors: for example, future English Catholic bishop Cuthbert Tunstall helped with the second edition; and he had friendly interactions with Spanish Cardinal Ximénez de Cisneros. Erasmus had a copy of the Complutensian Polyglot in time for his 1527 fourth edition, particularly used for improving Revelation.

Because Erasmus' only manuscript for the Book of Revelation was in fact a commentary by Andreas of Caesarea on Revelation, it made editing difficult. This caused not a few verses in Erasmus' first edition to include a few words of Andreas mixed in. Thus Revelation 21:23–24 has the words of Andreas in the King James Bible and Luther's German Bible due to this copying error.

Other manuscripts were available to later editors of the Textus Receptus. Robert Stephanus had access to over a dozen manuscripts, including Codex Bezae and Regius, additionally making use of the Complutensian Polyglot. Stephanus' edition of the Textus Receptus became one of the two "standard" texts of the Textus Receptus alongside those of Theodore Beza. Like Stephanus, Beza had access to a larger manuscript pool than Erasmus, including Codex Claromontanus and the Codex Bezae; however, he made very little use of them in his editions.

=== Last verses of Revelation ===
Although contested by some defenders of the Textus Receptus, it is widely accepted that because the manuscript which Erasmus used lacked the last six verses of Revelation, he used the Latin Vulgate to backtranslate the last verses of Revelation into Greek. However, he also used the notes of Valla, such as in the reading "Amen. Even so, come Lord Jesus" in Revelation 22:20, which does not completely agree with the Latin Vulgate. In this process, Erasmus introduced many distinct readings into the text of Revelation. Some of these readings were later edited out by Stephanus in his editions of the Textus Receptus, but some distinct Erasmian readings remained, such as the words "book of life" instead of "tree of life" in Revelation 22:19.

Some defenders of the Textus Receptus have argued that Erasmus used other Greek manuscripts for the last six verses of Revelation. Manuscripts such as 2049, 2067 and 296 which contain similar readings to the Textus Receptus have been proposed as possible sources for Erasmus' readings in the book of Revelation. However, critical scholarship today views these manuscripts as more likely being influenced by the printed Textus Receptus editions, instead of them being a source for the readings of Erasmus. It has also been noted that even if these manuscripts did not copy the Textus Receptus, that since Erasmus did not produce impossible Greek, it is possible for such manuscripts to contain similar readings by coincidence.

== History ==
=== Complutensian Polyglot ===
Complutensian Polyglot Bible is the name given to the first printed polyglot of the entire Bible. The edition was initiated and financed by Cardinal Francisco Jiménez de Cisneros (1436–1517). Although its printing (1514 and onward) predates the Greek New Testament of Erasmus' first edition of 1516, it was only published later due to delays. Its distribution and publication was finally executed around 1522; by that time Erasmus' popular, sell-out successful Greek New Testament was in its third edition.

Some, such as the Trinitarian Bible Society, associate the Complutensian Polyglot with the Textus Receptus tradition that traces its roots to Esasmus. However, the Polyglot is not usually named as part of the Textus Receptus tradition. It influenced the Textus Receptus and was utilized by editors of the Textus Receptus tradition, including Colinaeus, Stephanus, and Erasmus himself beginning with the fourth edition.

=== Erasmus ===
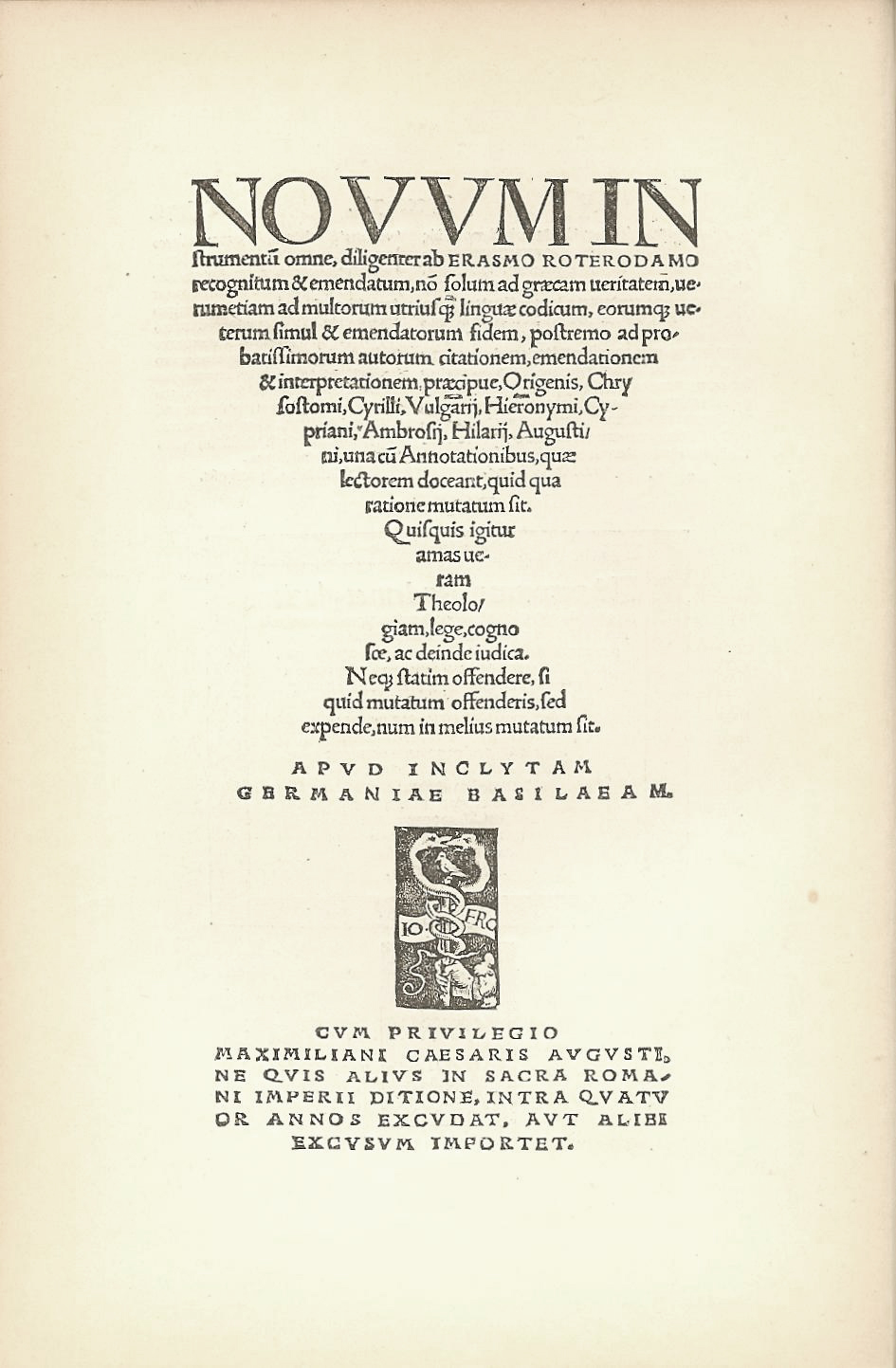
The title page of Erasmus' 1516 New Testament from Froben

Erasmus had been working for years making philological notes on scriptural and patristic texts. In 1512, he began his work on the Latin New Testament. He consulted all the Vulgate manuscripts that he could find to create an edition without scribal corruptions and with better Latin. In the earlier phases of the project, he never mentioned a Greek text: "My mind is so excited at the thought of emending Jerome's text, with notes, that I seem to myself inspired by some god. I have already almost finished emending him by collating a large number of ancient manuscripts, and this I am doing at enormous personal expense."

Some of Erasmus' Greek NT interest no doubt came from his publication of a printed version of Adnotationes in Novum Testamentum in 1505, of which he had discovered a manuscript version in 1504. Those notes compared Latin and Greek manuscripts known to the Italian humanist Lorenzo Valla, who had edited a Collatio Novi Testamenti in the 15th century. By putting Valla's work in print, Erasmus sparked interest in ad fontes, literally "back to the sources." Greek scholarship in Western Europe, brought on by an influx of Byzantine Greek scholars, was about to make the Greek New Testament a major point of interest for Protestant scholars who eschewed the Vulgate's connection to Roman Catholicism.

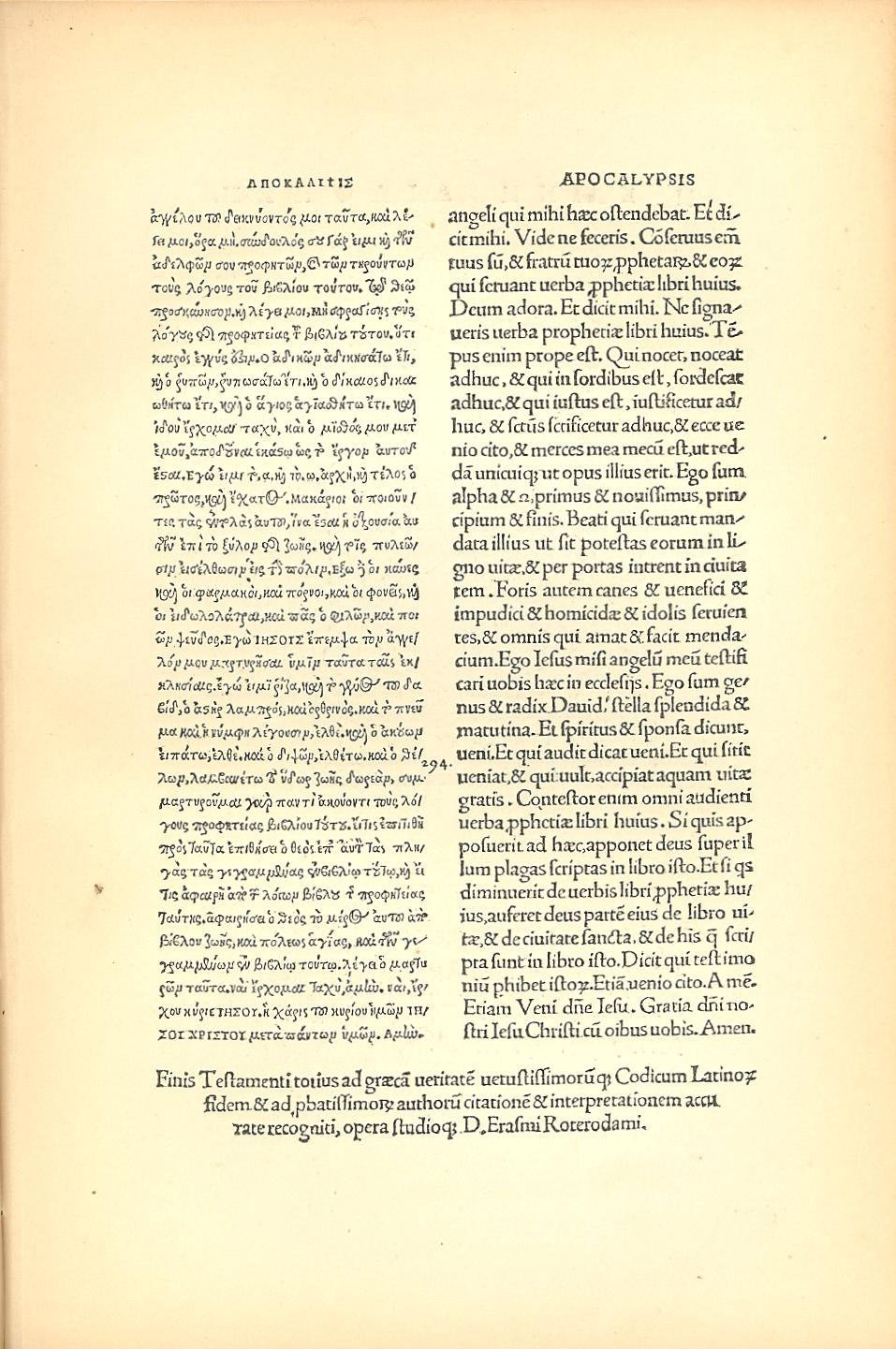
The last page of the Erasmian New Testament (Rev 22:8–21)

This ad fontes approach of the humanist tradition influenced Erasmus to include the Greek text in his NT to defend the superiority of his Latin version over the Vulgate. He wrote, "There remains the New Testament translated by me, with the Greek facing, and notes on it by me." He further demonstrated the reason for the inclusion of the Greek text when defending his work: "But one thing the facts cry out, and it can be clear, as they say, even to a blind man, that often through the translator's clumsiness or inattention the Greek has been wrongly rendered; often the true and genuine reading has been corrupted by ignorant scribes, which we see happen every day, or altered by scribes who are half-taught and half-asleep."

Erasmus's new work was published by Froben of Basel in 1516, becoming the first published Greek New Testament, the Novum Instrumentum omne, diligenter ab Erasmo Rot. Recognitum et Emendatum. For the Greek text, he used manuscripts 1, 1^{rK}, 2^{e}, 2^{ap}, 4^{ap}, 7, 817. In his research in England and Brabant for annotations on particular words, he had already consulted several other manuscripts and was particularly interested in patristic quotations as evidence of early readings. For subsequent editions he used more manuscripts and consulted with his vast network of correspondents.

Typographical errors, attributed to the rush to print the first edition, abounded in the published text. Erasmus also lacked a complete copy of the Book of Revelation and translated the last six verses back into Greek from the Latin Vulgate to finish his edition. Erasmus adjusted the text in many places to correspond with readings found in the Vulgate or as quoted in the Church Fathers; consequently, although the Textus Receptus is classified by scholars as a late Byzantine text, it differs in nearly 2,000 readings from the standard form of that text-type, as represented by the "Majority Text" of Hodges and Farstad (Wallace, 1989). The edition was a sell-out commercial success resulting in a second edition in 1519, with most but not all of the typographical errors corrected.

Erasmus had been studying Greek New Testament manuscripts for many years in the Netherlands, France, England, and Switzerland, noting their many variants, but had only six Greek manuscripts immediately accessible to him in Basel. They all dated from the 12th century or later, and only one came from outside the mainstream Byzantine tradition. Consequently, most modern scholars consider his Greek text to be of dubious quality.

Jacobus Lopis Stunica, an editor of the Complutensian Polyglot Bible, complained that Erasmus had not included the Comma Johanneum in 1 John containing the Trinitarian statement about "the Father, the Word, and the Holy Ghost," language found in most Latin New Testaments. The young humanist Edward Lee, then of Lincoln College, Oxford vociferously complained about Erasmus' scholarship on several accounts, engaging in numerous disputes with Erasmus including the Comma. Erasmus replied to his critics with reasoning to examine sources for the supposed omissions and errors, even asking Paulus Bombasius in 1521 to view the ancient Codex Vaticanus for him to see if the Comma was found there; it was not.

However, the critics won. In the third edition of Erasmus' Greek text (1522), the Comma Johanneum was included because "Erasmus chose to avoid any occasion for slander rather than persisting in philological accuracy" even though he remained "convinced that it did not belong to the original text of l John." The spurious Codex Britannicus, i.e. Minuscule 61 by which it is now known, was likely produced "about 1520" (and certainly after 1516) and shown to Erasmus for his 1522 printing; he placed a lengthy footnote about the Comma, reporting his suspicion (that still persists) that the manuscript had been created for the sole purpose of confusing him. Minuscule 61's usefulness is completely insignificant except for its inclusion of the Comma, as indicated by the good preservation of its paper except on the page containing it, and to which it turns when handled.

Popular demand for Greek New Testaments led to a flurry of further authorized and unauthorized editions in the early sixteenth century, almost all of which were based on Erasmus's work and incorporated his particular readings but typically also making a number of minor changes of their own.

=== Colinaeus ===
Simon de Colines (1480–1546) printed an edition of the Textus Receptus, which was primarily based on Erasmus editions and the Complutensian Polyglot's Greek column. His Ἡ Καινὴ Διαθήκη edition was first printed in 1534; however, its influence was minimal, and it was not used by later editors of the Textus Receptus. The Colinaeus edition was one of the earliest attempts at a critical edition.

The widow of Henri Estienne, a Paris printer, married Colinaeus in 1520. He took over the Estienne press until his wife's son, Robert Estienne (1503–1559), acquired it in 1526. Colinaeus and his stepson printed from different shops in Paris for several years. Robert Estienne, known as Stephanus, would eventually produce his own Greek New Testaments.

=== Estienne (Stephanus) and Beza ===
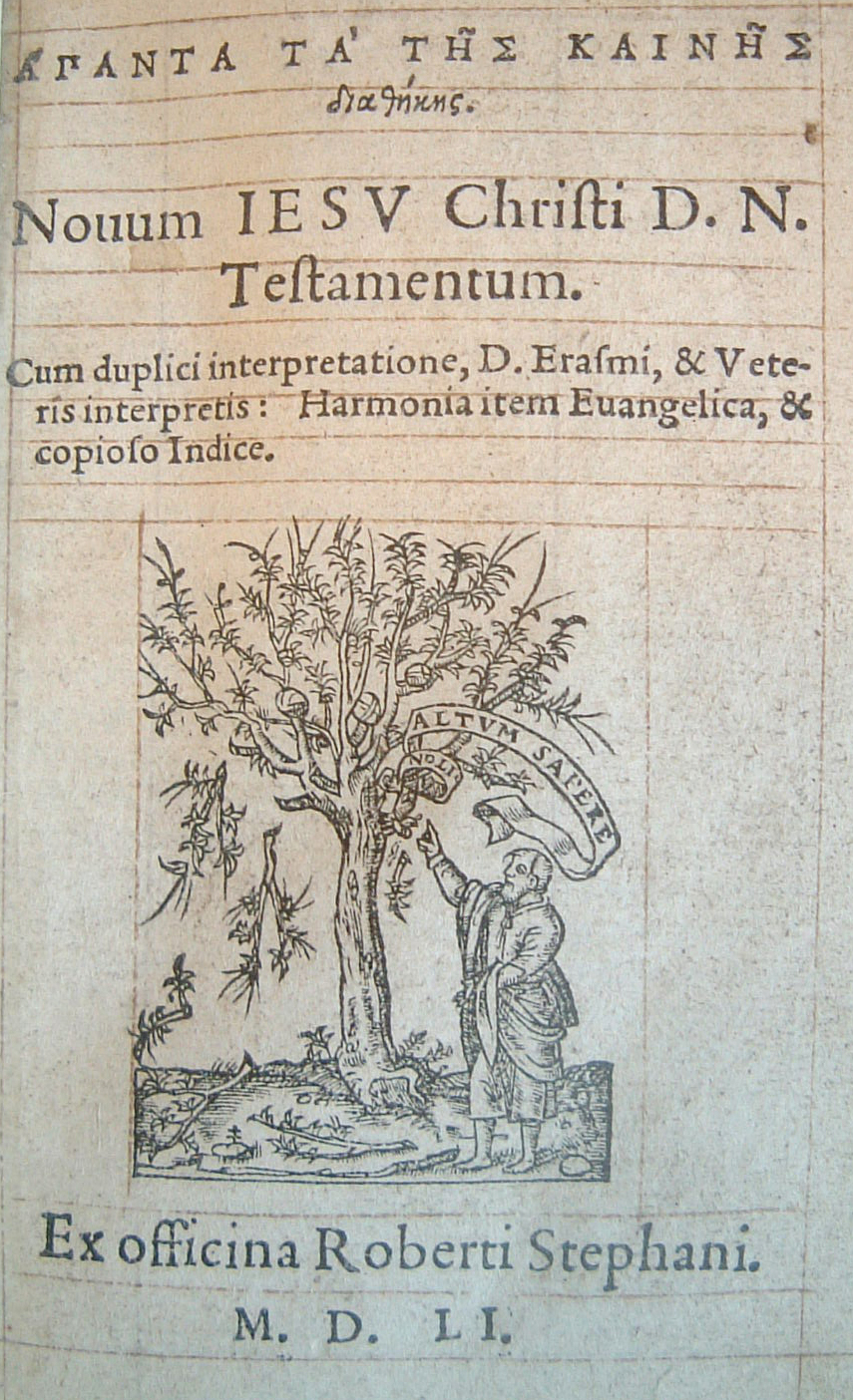
4th edition of New Testament of Robert Estienne

Stephanus was a book printer in Paris as his father and stepfather had been. He edited the Greek New Testament four times, in 1546, 1549, 1550 and 1551, the last in Geneva. The large third edition was popular and influential. The edition of 1551 contains the Latin translation of Erasmus and the Vulgate. Estienne's version was re-issued with minor revisions of the Greek by Genevan leader Theodore Beza in 1565, 1582, 1588–89, 1598 and 1611.

The third edition of 1550, known as the Editio Regia for its fanciness, became the standard text for what is now called the Textus Receptus, even though he did not call it that; it is what many people refer to as the Stephanus text or Textus Receptus.

The fourth edition of 1551 was significant for Robert Estienne's novel verse numbering. This was the first time the New Testament had been printed with modern verse notation. Virtually all Bibles printed since then have used these chapters and verses.

Theodore Beza, the theologian and orator, for his part, was able to include readings from some better manuscripts: the Codex Bezae and Codex Claromontanus, which he discovered and obtained. However, he did little of that, instead publishing what amounted to reprints of the editions of Stephanus and doing very little in the way of criticism or eclecticism of the Greek NT. Instead, Beza's Latin version of the New Testament was extremely popular and more aligned with his calling, as he was the successor to John Calvin and ad hoc spiritual leader of Calvinism in the Protestant Church of Geneva.

Beza died in 1605, but his Greek NT editions would long outlast him, as they were the basis for subsequent editions and translations of the Bible into vernacular. The King James Version editors used Stephanus' verses and consulted Beza's Greek.

=== Elzevier family of Leiden ===
The origin of the term Textus Receptus comes from a critical edition of the Greek Text by Jeremias Hölzlin (1583–1641), a Leiden professor of Greek studies. This 1633 edition, printed by the Elzevir printing house, is titled Ἡ Καινὴ Διαθήκη Novum Testamentum. It was one of several Greek New Testaments printed by Bonaventure and his nephew Abraham Elzevir, who were partners in a printing business at Leiden.

The 1633 Leiden preface reads, Textum ergo habes, nunc ab omnibus receptum: in quo nihil immutatum aut corruptum damus ("so you hold the text, now received by all, in which [is] nothing corrupt"). The words textum and receptum were modified from the accusative to the nominative case to render Textus Receptus, the name by which Greek New Testaments became known. It was established by modern research that the Preface was written by Daniel Heinsius.

The Elzevirs published several other Greek New Testaments from 1624 to 1678, including the most influential from Hoelzlin (1633) and one edited by Richard Whittaker of London (1633) using the same text as Hoelzlin's but a different apparatus.

Over time, the term coined by Heinsius's preface has been retroactively applied even to Erasmus's editions, as his work served as the basis of the others.

=== F.H.A. Scrivener ===
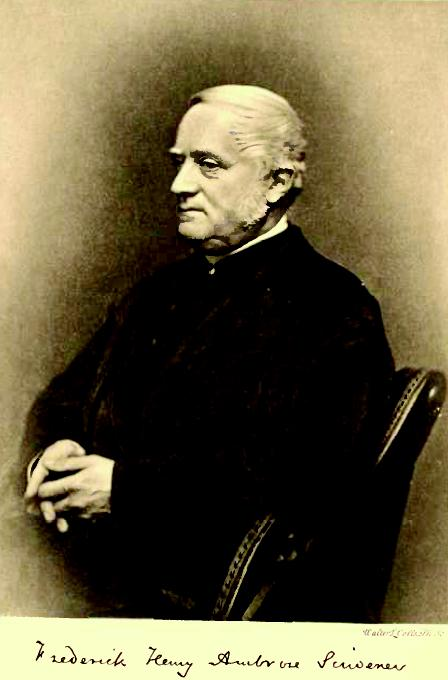
F.H.A Scrivener

In 1894, Frederick Henry Ambrose Scrivener produced a significant Greek edition of the Textus Receptus, based on the textual variants that the translators of the King James Version (KJV) had utilized. The translators of the King James Version did not rely on a single edition of the Textus Receptus but instead they incorporated readings from multiple editions of the Textus Receptus, including those by Erasmus, Stephanus, and Beza. Additionally, they consulted the Complutensian Polyglot and the Latin Vulgate itself. This resulted in a Greek text that, while rooted in the tradition of the Textus Receptus, uniquely aligned with the particular readings of the King James Version.

=== Modern sentiment of textual critics ===
Textual critics who examine the Textus Receptus tradition have found that the early adoption of the editions of Erasmus was a setback to textual criticism. The specific manuscripts that Erasmus copied from had a major effect on scholars of the 16th century to the point where readings that differed from Novum Testamentum were seen to be substandard. Indeed, Erasmus himself may have forgotten the locations of the several places in the 1516 edition that he injected his own invented Greek edits to match the familiar Latin because not all of them were fixed in the second and subsequent editions. Thus, even by the fifth edition of the Erasmus Greek NTs, the printed text had not been purged of its Latin and its late manuscript bias, becoming the basis for the Received Text and translations into vernacular, e.g. the King James Version.

Critics observe that the Textus Receptus tradition eschewed criticism of the text in favor of theological concerns, as well. Metzger (Note: "The Precritical Period" is the name of his chapter on the Textus Receptus) refers to the era of Erasmus, Colinae, Stephanus, Beza, and the Elzvirs as the "precritical period" of textual criticism. And so even though Erasmus preferred the older manuscripts and the readings supported by the Church Fathers, his printed NT text, based largely on medieval manuscripts and Latin interpolations, became the Received Text for hundreds of years.

Rudimentary forms of textual criticism began in the 16th century with a small amount of eclecticism of the Received Text. Later, variant readings were assembled and noted by editors of Greek New Testaments that printed a Received Text in the body and variants in the margins. This collation and critical apparatus work was done by Brian Walton, Archbishop Ussher, John Fell, John Mill, and Edward Wells, beginning in the 17th century and onward.

== Textual criticism ==
Bishop John Mill (1645–1707) collated textual variants from 82 Greek manuscripts. In his Novum Testamentum Graecum, cum lectionibus variantibus MSS (Oxford 1707) he reprinted the unchanged text of the Editio Regia, but in the index he enumerated 30,000 textual variants.

Shortly after Mill published his edition, Daniel Whitby (1638–1725) attacked his work by asserting that the text of the New Testament had never been corrupted and thus equated autographs with the Textus Receptus. He considered the 30,000 variants in Mill's edition a danger to Holy Scripture and called for defending the Textus Receptus against these variants.

Johann Albrecht Bengel (1687–1752) edited in 1725 Prodromus Novi Testamenti Graeci Rectè Cautèque Adornandi and in 1734 Novum Testamentum Graecum. Bengel divided manuscripts into families and subfamilies and favoured the principle of lectio difficilior potior ("the more difficult reading is the stronger").

Johann Jakob Wettstein's apparatus was fuller than that of any previous editor. He introduced the practice of indicating the ancient manuscripts by capital Roman letters and the later manuscripts by Arabic numerals. He published in Basel Prolegomena ad Novi Testamenti Graeci (1731).

J. J. Griesbach (1745–1812) combined the principles of Bengel and Wettstein. He enlarged the Apparatus by considering more citations from the Fathers, and various versions, such as the Gothic, the Armenian, and the Philoxenian. Griesbach distinguished amongst a Western, an Alexandrian, and a Byzantine recension of the Greek NT. Christian Frederick Matthaei (1744–1811) was a Griesbach opponent.

Karl Lachmann (1793–1851) was the first who broke with the Textus Receptus. His object was to restore the text to the form in which it had been read in the ancient Church in about A.D. 380. He used the oldest known Greek and Latin manuscripts.

Constantin von Tischendorf's Editio Octava Critica Maior was based on newly-discovered Codex Sinaiticus and was completely at odds with the TR tradition.

Westcott and Hort published The New Testament in the Original Greek in 1881 in which they rejected what they considered to be the dated and inadequate Textus Receptus. Their text was primarily based on Codex Vaticanus in the Gospels.

== Defense ==
Frederick von Nolan, a 19th-century historian and Greek and Latin scholar, spent 28 years attempting to trace the Textus Receptus to apostolic origins. He was an ardent advocate of the supremacy of the Textus Receptus over all other editions of the Greek New Testament, and he argued that the first editors of the printed Greek New Testament intentionally selected those texts because of their superiority and disregarded other texts, which represented other text-types because of their inferiority.

It is not to be conceived that the original editors of the [Greek] New Testament were wholly destitute of plan in selecting those manuscripts, out of which they were to form the text of their printed editions. In the sequel it will appear, that they were not altogether ignorant of two classes of manuscripts; one of which contains the text which we have adopted from them; and the other that text which has been adopted by M. Griesbach.

Regarding Erasmus, Nolan stated:

Nor let it be conceived in disparagement of the great undertaking of Erasmus, that he was merely fortuitously right. Had he barely undertaken to perpetuate the tradition on which he received the sacred text he would have done as much as could be required of him, and more than sufficient to put to shame the puny efforts of those who have vainly labored to improve upon his design. [...] With respect to Manuscripts, it is indisputable that he was acquainted with every variety which is known to us, having distributed them into two principal classes, one of which corresponds with the Complutensian edition, the other with the Vatican manuscript. And he has specified the positive grounds on which he received the one and rejected the other.

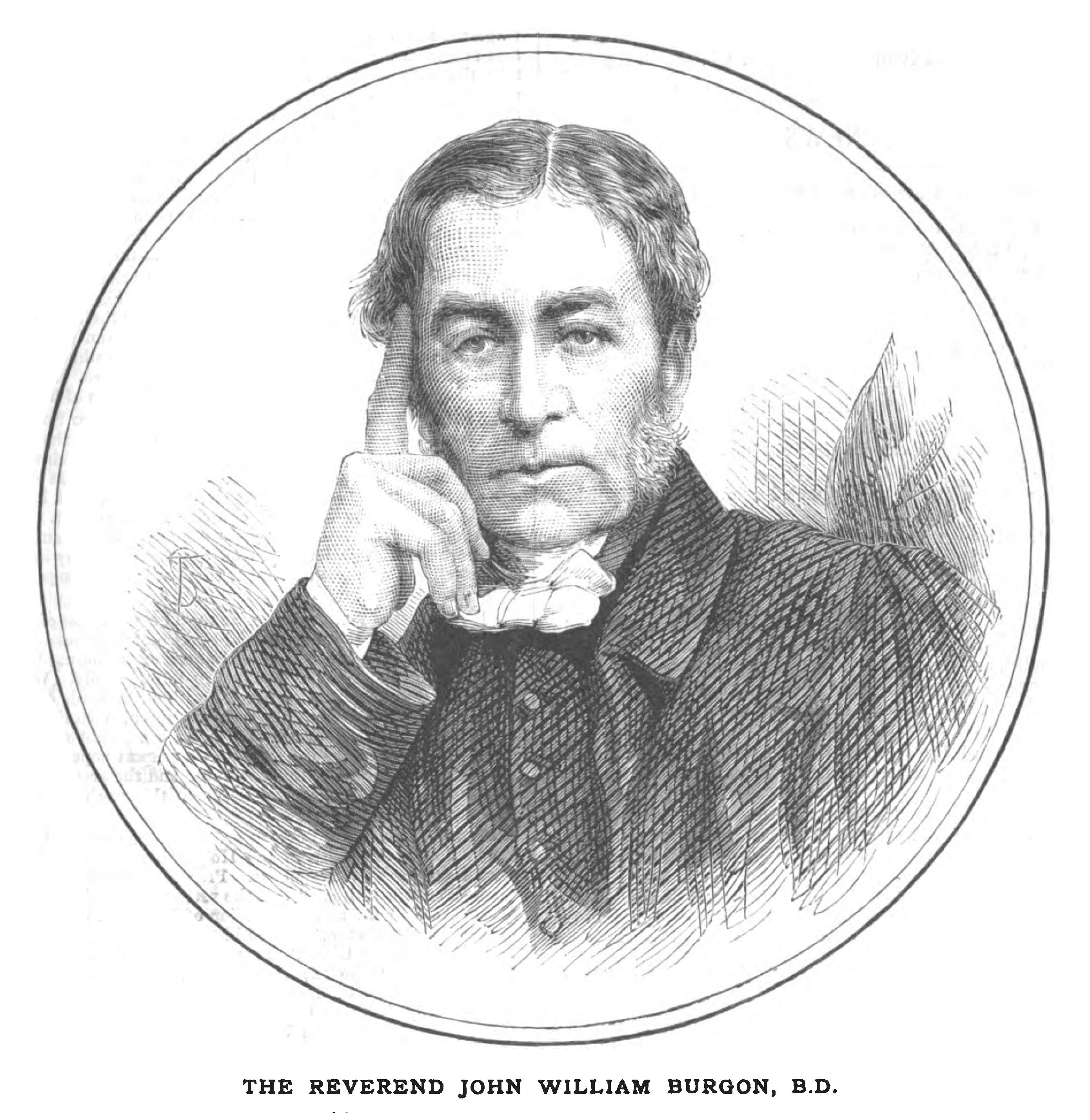
John William Burgon

The Textus Receptus was defended by John William Burgon in his The Revision Revised (1881) and also by Edward Miller in A Guide to the Textual Criticism of the New Testament (1886). Burgon supported his arguments with the opinion that the Codex Alexandrinus and Codex Ephraemi were older than the Sinaiticus and the Vaticanus; and also that the Peshitta translation into Syriac (which supports the Byzantine Text) originated in the 2nd century. Miller's arguments in favour of readings in the Textus Receptus were of the same kind. However, both Burgon and Miller believed that although the Textus Receptus was to be preferred to the Alexandrian Text, it still required to be corrected in certain readings against the manuscript tradition of the Byzantine text. In that judgement, they are criticised by Edward F. Hills, who argues that the principle that God provides truth through scriptural revelation also must imply that God must ensure a preserved transmission of the correct revealed text, continuing into the Reformation era of biblical translation and printing. For Hills, the task of biblical scholarship is to identify the particular line of preserved transmission through which God is acting; a line that he sees in the specific succession of manuscript copying, textual correction and printing, which culminated in the Textus Receptus and the King James Bible. Hills argues that the principle of providentially-preserved transmission guarantees that the printed Textus Receptus must be the closest text to the Greek autographs and so he rejects readings in the Byzantine Majority Text where they are not maintained in the Textus Receptus. He goes so far as to conclude that Erasmus must have been providentially guided when he introduced Latin Vulgate readings into his Greek text; and even argues for the authenticity of the Comma Johanneum.

Hence the true text is found not only in the text of the majority of the New Testament manuscripts but more especially in the Textus Receptus and in faithful translations of the Textus Receptus, such as the King James Version. In short, the Textus Receptus represents the God-guided revision of the majority text.

Hills was the first textual critic to defend the Textus Receptus. Although others have defended it per se, they are not acknowledged textual critics (such as Theodore Letis and David Hocking) or their works are not on a scholarly level (such as Terence H. Brown and D. A. Waite).

=== Providential preservation ===
Those who still advocate the use of the Textus Receptus often rely upon a theological stance of supernatural providential preservation, arguing that a reliance upon naturalism to establish the text of the New Testament is contrary to divine revelation. Thus, they have cited passages such as Psalm 12:6–7, Psalm 119:89, Matthew 5:18, Psalm 117:2, Matthew 24:35 and 1 Peter 1:25 as evidence that God would miraculously preserve every single true reading of the Bible. This interpretation, however, has been challenged by critics of the Textus Receptus who often assert that these scriptural passages pertain to God's oral communication with humanity rather than the written scriptures or to a more general preservation in the New Testament manuscripts as a whole.

== Relationship to Byzantine text ==
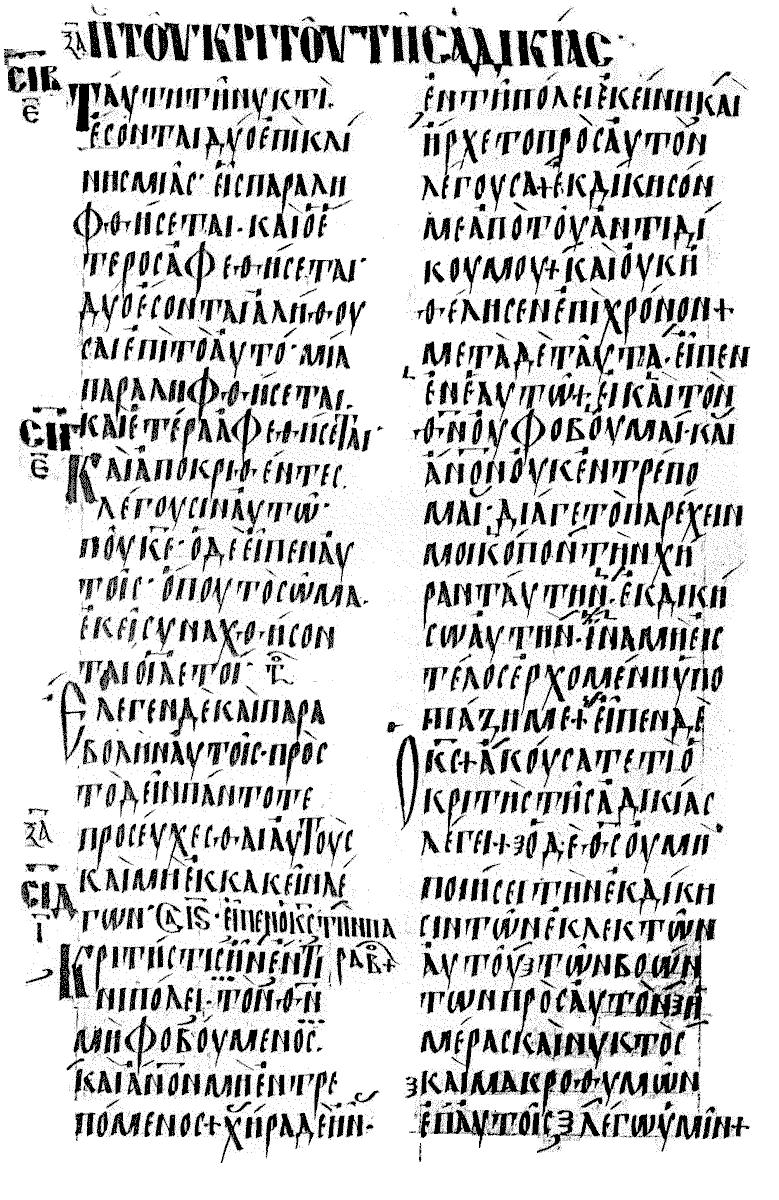
Codex Vaticanus 354 S (028), an uncial codex with a Byzantine text

Erasmus's Greek New Testament was mainly established on a basis of manuscripts of the Byzantine text-type and usually is identified with it by its followers. However, in addition, over many years, Erasmus had extensively annotated New Testament citations in early Fathers, such as Augustine and Ambrose, whose biblical quotations more frequently conformed to the Western text-type; and he drew extensively on these citations (and also on the Vulgate) in support of his choice of Greek readings.

The Textus Receptus differs from the Majority Text edition of Robinson and Pierpont in 1,838 Greek readings, of which 1,005 represent "translatable" differences. Most of these variants are minor; however, Byzantine manuscripts usually exclude the Comma Johanneum and Acts 8:37, which are present in the Textus Receptus. Despite these differences, printed editions based on the Byzantine text agree far more closely with the Textus Receptus than with the critical text, as the Majority Text disagrees with the critical text 6,577 times in contrast to the 1,838 times it disagrees with the Textus Receptus. Additionally, multiple of the agreements between the Textus Receptus and the Byzantine text are very significant, such as the reading of "God" in 1 Timothy 3:16 and the inclusion of the Story of the Adulteress. Sometimes the Textus Receptus contains readings which are present within the Byzantine text-type, but form a minority therein. This includes the reading "through his blood" in Colossians 1:14, which is contained in around 40% of the Byzantine manuscripts of Colossians, being omitted from the Byzantine critical edition of Robinson and Pierpont and that of Hodges and Farstad.

F. H. A. Scrivener (1813–1891) remarked that at Matt. 22:28; 23:25; 27:52; 28:3, 4, 19, 20; Mark 7:18, 19, 26; 10:1; 12:22; 15:46; Luke 1:16, 61; 2:43; 9:1, 15; 11:49; John 1:28; 10:8; 13:20, Erasmus followed the readings of Minuscule 1 (Caesarean text-type). For Revelation, Erasmus used Minuscule 2814, which follows the Andreas text-type. The Andreas text-type has been called a subtype of the Majority Text in Revelation, which is divided into the Koine form of Revelation and the Andreas type of Revelation.

Dean Burgon, an influential supporter of the Textus Receptus declared that it needs correction. He suggested 150 corrections in its Gospel of Matthew alone.

- Matthew 10:8 has Alexandrian reading νεκροὺς ἐγείρετε (raise the dead) omitted by the Byzantine text.
- Acts 20:28 has Alexandrian reading τοῦ Θεοῦ (of God) instead of Byzantine τοῦ Κυρίου καὶ Θεοῦ (of the Lord and God).

== Controversial readings ==
The Textus Receptus contains many well known variants, such as the Comma Johanneum, Confession of the Ethiopian eunuch, the long ending of Mark, the Pericope Adulterae, the reading "God" in 1 Timothy 3:16 and the reading "book of life" in Revelation 22:19.

=== Comma Johanneum (1 John 5:7) ===
The Comma Johanneum is a Trinitarian text included in 1 John 5:7 within the Textus Receptus, however the comma is seen as an interpolation by almost all textual critics. The comma is mainly attested in the Latin manuscripts of the New Testament, being absent from the vast majority of Greek manuscripts of the New Testament, the earliest Greek manuscript including it being from the 14th century. It is also totally absent in the Ethiopic, Aramaic, Syriac, Georgian, Arabic and from the early pre-12th century Armenian witnesses to the New Testament. As a result, most modern translations, both Catholic and Protestant, do not include the comma in the main body of the text.

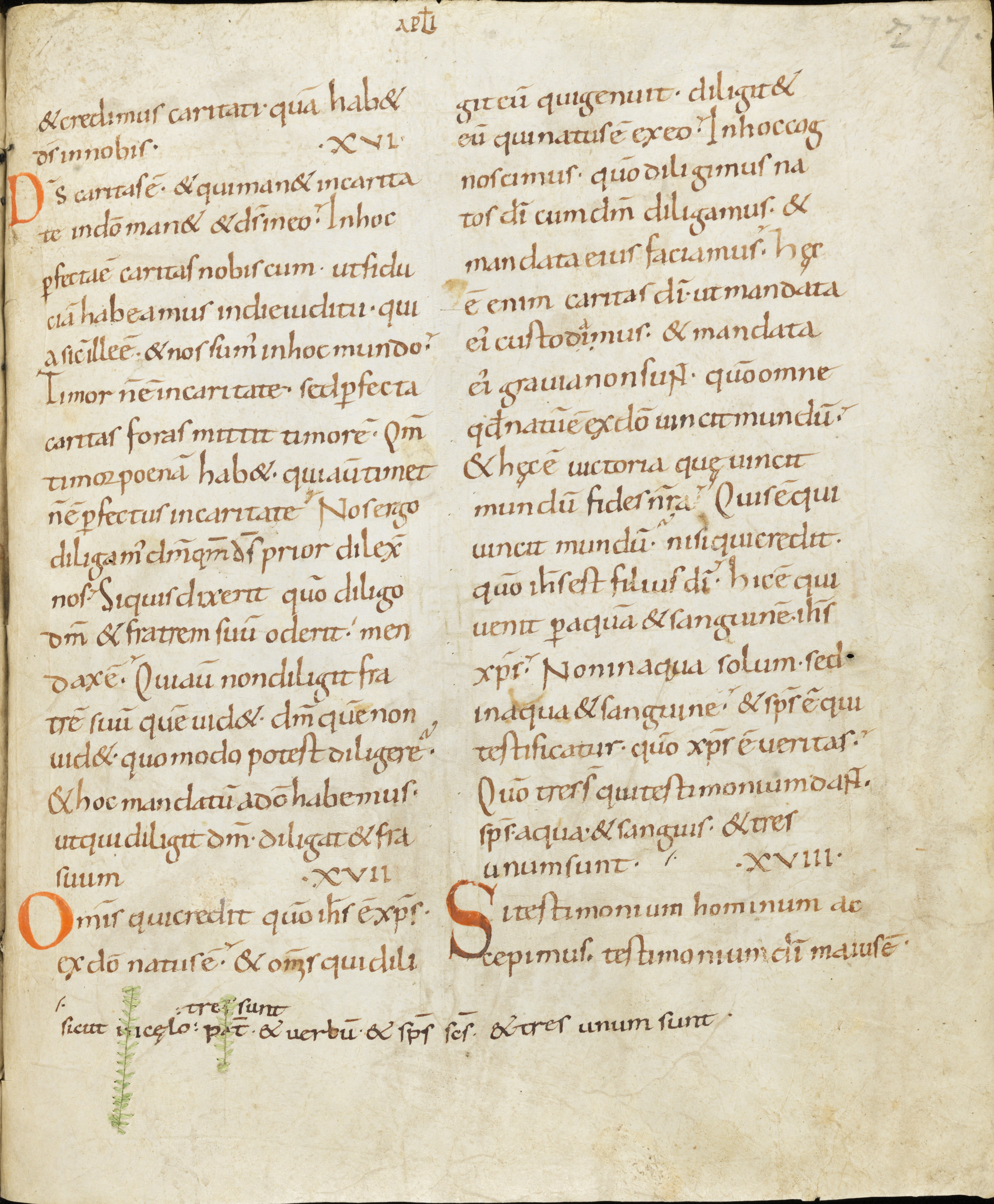
Codex Sangallensis 63 (9th century), Johannine Comma at the bottom: tre[s] sunt pat[er] & uerbu[m] & sps [=spiritus] scs [=sanctus] & tres unum sunt. Translation: "three are the father and the word and the holy spirit and the three are one". The original codex did not contain the Comma Johanneum (in 1 John 5:7), but it was added by a later hand on the margin.

The text (with the comma in italics and enclosed by brackets) in the King James Bible reads:

^{7}For there are three that beare record [in heaven, the Father, the Word, and the Holy Ghost: and these three are one.] ^{8}[And there are three that beare witnesse in earth], the Spirit, and the Water, and the Blood, and these three agree in one.

— King James Version (1611)

In the Greek Textus Receptus (TR), the verse reads thus:

ὅτι τρεῖς εἰσιν οἱ μαρτυροῦντες εν τῷ οὐρανῷ, ὁ πατήρ, ὁ λόγος, καὶ τὸ Ἅγιον Πνεῦμα· καὶ οὗτοι οἱ τρεῖς ἕν εἰσι.

The earliest surviving Latin manuscripts containing the comma date back to the 5th to 7th centuries. These include the Freisinger fragment (6th-7th century), León palimpsest (7th century), besides the younger Codex Speculum (5th century). Its first full appearance in Greek is from the Greek version of the Acts of the Lateran Council in 1215. It subsequently appears in the writings of Emmanuel Calecas (died 1410), Joseph Bryennius (1350 – 1431/38) and in the Orthodox Confession of Moglas (1643). While there are no comprehensive Patristic Greek references to the comma, F.H.A. Scrivener notes potential allusions to it somewhere around the 4th to 5th century in three Greek texts: the Pseudo-Athanasian Synopsis of Holy Scripture and Disputation with Arius and an anonymous homily dated to 381 AD. It is only found in a few later Greek manuscripts: 61 (c. 1520), 629 (14th), 918 (16th century), 2318 (18th century), 2473 (17th century), and in the margins of 88 (11th century with margins added at the 16th century), 177 (BSB Cod. graec. 211), 221 (10th century with margins added at the 15th/16th century), 429 (14th century with margins added at the 16th century), 636 (16th century) and possibly 635 (11th century, added later into the margin).

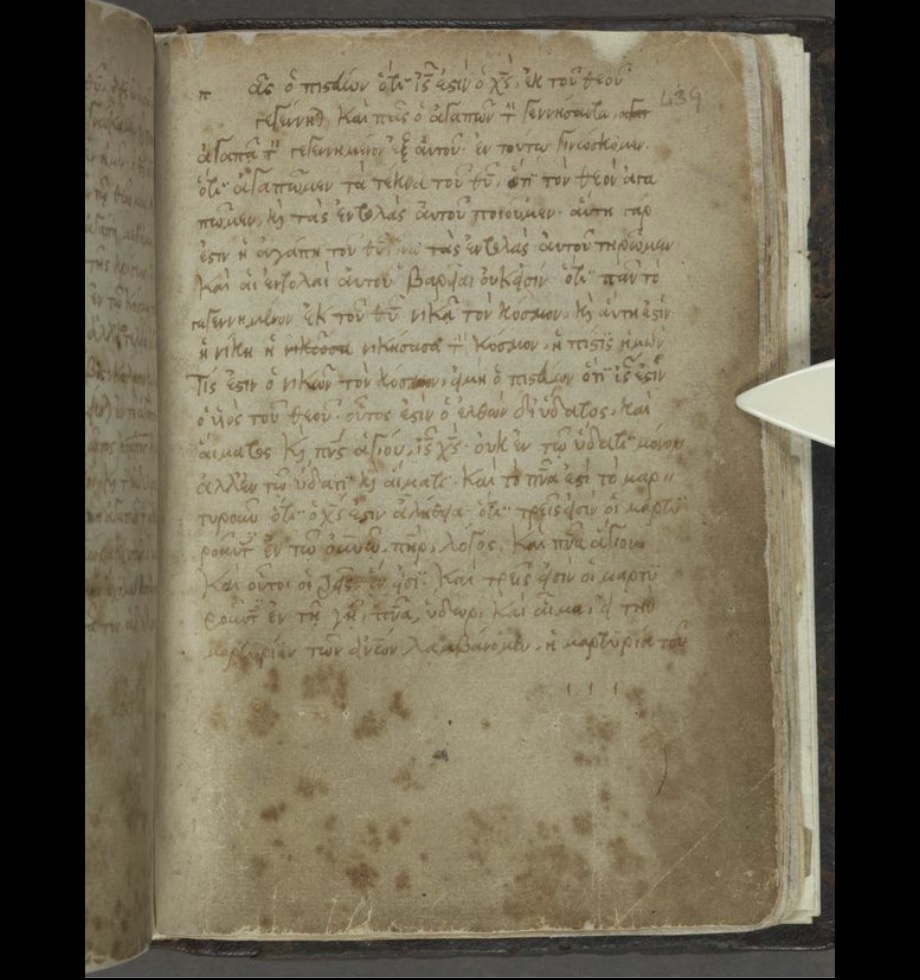
Codex Montfortianus (1520) page 434 recto with 1 John 5 Comma Johanneum. This is the page to which the manuscript is virtually always turned to. Erasmus thought that this manuscript was designed to confuse him on this very point.

The Codex Vaticanus in some places contains umlauts to indicate knowledge of variants. Although there has been some debate on the age of these umlauts and if they were added at a later date, according to a paper made by Philip B. Payne, the ink seems to match that of the original scribe. The Codex Vaticanus contains these dots around 1 John 5:7, however according to McDonald, G. R, it is far more likely that the scribe had encountered other variants in the verse than the Johannine comma, which is not attested in Greek manuscripts until the 14th century.

The Johannine comma gained a stronger position within the Latin tradition, especially in the middle ages, being referenced to by Peter Abelard (12th century), Peter Lombard (12th century), Bernard of Clairvaux (12th century), Thomas Aquinas (13th century) and William of Ockham (14th century) among many others. The first undisputed work to quote the Comma Johanneum as an actual part of the Epistle's text appears to be the 4th century Latin homily Liber Apologeticus, probably written by Priscillian of Ávila (died 385), or his close follower Bishop Instantius. However some have argued that the 3rd-century Church father Cyprian (died 258) knew of the comma earlier, who in Unity of the Church 1.6 may have quoted the Johannine comma: "Again it is written of the Father, and of the Son, and of the Holy Spirit, 'And these three are one.'" Nevertheless, other scholars believe that he was giving an allegorical interpretation of the three elements mentioned in the uncontested part of the verse instead of quoting the Johannine comma itself.

=== Confession of the Ethiopian Eunuch (Acts 8:37) ===
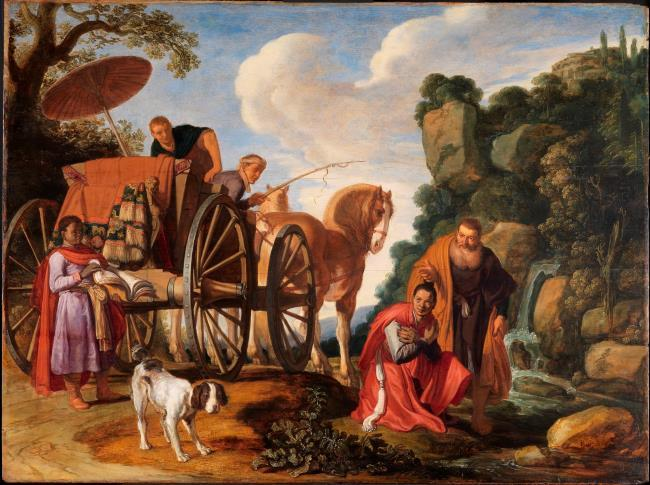
The Baptism of the Eunuch, Pieter Lastman, 1623

The confession of the Ethiopian eunuch is a variant reading in Acts 8:37, widely seen by Textual Critics to be a later interpolation into the text. It is found in the King James Version due to its existence within the Textus Receptus.

It reads in the King James Version as:

And Philip said, If thou believest with all thine heart, thou mayest. And he answered and said, I believe that Jesus Christ is the Son of God.

In the Greek of the Textus Receptus, the verse reads:

ειπεν δε ο φιλιππος ει πιστευεις εξ ολης της καρδιας εξεστιν αποκριθεις δε ειπεν πιστευω τον υιον του θεου ειναι τον ιησουν χριστον

Erasmus himself decided to include the verse in his edition of the Greek text due to its presence in the Latin Vulgate of his day and due to being in the margin of Minuscule 2816 (15th century), which he used in his compilation of the Textus Receptus. The reading is quoted by many western early Christian writers, such as Irenaeus (130 – c. 202), Cyprian (210 – 258), Ambrose (339 – 397) and Augustine (354 – 430). The verse is found in the Codex Glazier (4-5th century), the Harclensis Syriac (7th century), some Old Latin and Vulgate manuscripts alongside some Ethiopian, Georgian and Armenian manuscripts. Nevertheless, the earliest Greek manuscript to contain the verse is Codex Laudianus (550) and it is not found in 𝔓^{45} (250), 𝔓^{74} (7th century), Codex Sinaiticus (4th century), Vaticanus (4th century). Alexandrinus (5th century), Ephraemi Rescriptus (5th century), Codex Athous Lavrensis (8th-9th century) and a multitude of other codices and cursives.

=== Pericope Adulterae (John 7:53-8:11) ===
The Pericope Adulterae is a passage found in John 7:53-8:11. It is viewed by most New Testament scholars as an interpolation, including Evangelical scholars. The pericope does not occur in the earliest Greek manuscripts discovered in Egypt. The Pericope Adulterae is not in 𝔓^{66} or in 𝔓^{75}, both of which have been assigned to the late 100s or early 200s, nor in two important manuscripts produced in the early or mid 300s, Sinaiticus and Vaticanus. The first surviving Greek manuscript to contain the pericope is the Latin-Greek diglot Codex Bezae, produced in the 400s. The Codex Bezae is also the earliest surviving Latin manuscript to contain it. Out of 23 Old Latin manuscripts of John 7–8, seventeen contain at least part of the pericope, and represent at least three transmission-streams in which it was included.

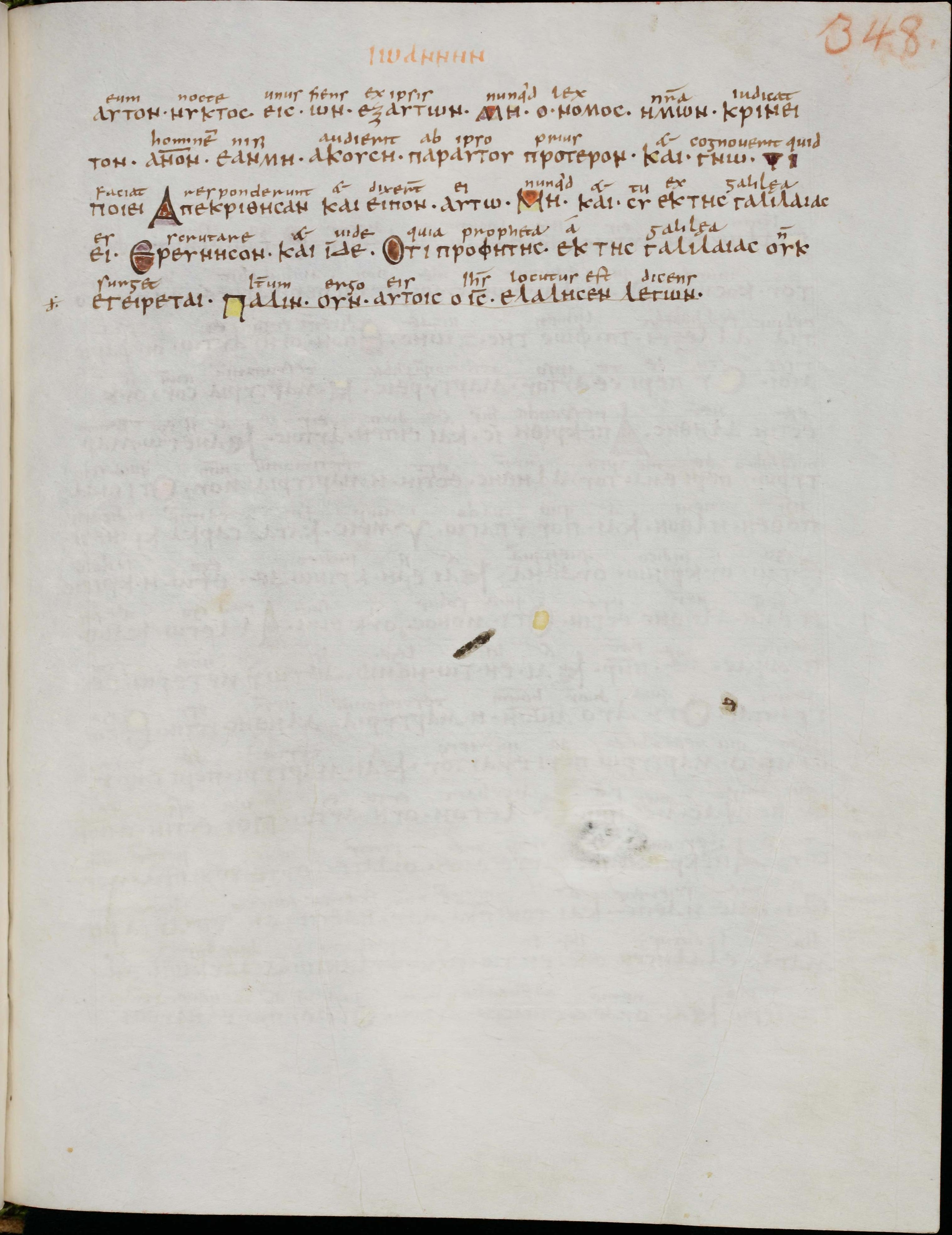
Codex Sangallensis 48 with the blanked space for the pericope John 7:53–8:11

Alongside the Old Latin manuscripts, the Pericope Adulterae is found in most Byzantine text-type manuscripts, Palestinian Syriac manuscripts, the Latin Vulgate and some Armenian manuscripts. The earliest Greek writing to explicitly reference the passage is the Didascalia Apostolorum (3rd century). The passage is later referenced to in Greek by Didymus the Blind (4th century) alongside the Apostolic Constitutions (4th century), the Synopsis Scripturae Sacrae (6th century) and the 6th century canon tables of the Monastery of Saint Epiphanus. Additionally, some manuscripts such as Codex Regius (8th century) and Codex Sangallensis (9th century) contain a large gap after John 7:52, thus indicating knowledge of the passage despite being omitted. Due to its presence within most manuscripts within the Byzantine text-type, it is also a characteristic of Byzantine printed editions of the New Testament such as the texts of Maurice A. Robinson & William G. Pierpont and The Greek New Testament According to the Majority Text (Hodges-Farstad).

There is now a broad academic consensus that the passage is a later interpolation added after the earliest known manuscripts of the Gospel of John. This has been the view of "most NT scholars, including most evangelical NT scholars, for well over a century". Bishop J. B. Lightfoot wrote that absence of the passage from the earliest manuscripts, combined with the occurrence of stylistic characteristics atypical of John, together implied that the passage was an interpolation. Nevertheless, he considered the story to be authentic history. Bart D. Ehrman concurs in Misquoting Jesus, adding that the passage contains many words and phrases otherwise alien to John's writing. The evangelical Bible scholar Daniel B. Wallace agrees with Ehrman.

However, advocates of the Byzantine priority theory and those who view the Textus Receptus as the most accurate text have attempted to argue for the Johannine authorship of the story. They have argued that there are points of similarity between the pericope's style and the style of the rest of the gospel, saying that anomalies in the transmission of the Pericope Adulterae may be explained by the Lectionary system, where due to the Pericope Adulterae being skipped during the Pentecost lesson, some scribes would relocate or omit the story to not interviene with the flow of the Pentecost lesson.

=== Book of life (Revelation 22:19) ===
The Textus Receptus in Revelation 22:19 reads "book of life" instead of the Nestle-Aland reading "tree of life", which the Textus Receptus contains on the grounds of the Latin Vulgate (380) reading, however it is also attested within the scriptural quotations of Ambrose (339 – 4 April 397) and in some Coptic manuscripts. Modern textual critics see the Latin Vulgate reading which found its way into the Textus Receptus as a typo caused by the similarity of the Latin words for book "libro" and tree "ligno".

=== Fellowship (Ephesians 3:9) ===
The Textus Receptus contains a unique reading "fellowship" (koinonia) instead of "administration" (oikonomia) in Ephesians 3:9. This variant is found in 10% of the Greek manuscripts of Ephesians alongside its inclusion in the Textus Receptus. It is missing from the Sinaiaticus (4th century), Vaticanus (4th century), Alexandrinus (5th century) and Papyrus 46 (3rd century).

=== The longer ending of Mark (Mark 16:9-20) ===
Mark 16:9-20 or the longer ending of Mark is a variant found within the Textus Receptus which has generally been assumed to have been a later addition into the text by modern textual critics. The earliest extant complete manuscripts of Mark, Codex Sinaiticus and Codex Vaticanus, two 4th-century manuscripts, do not contain the last twelve verses, 16:9–20. It is also omitted by one Syriac manuscript, the Syriac Sinaiticus (4th century) and one Old Latin manuscript, the Codex Bobbiensis (430). It is also missing from some Georgian and Armenian manuscripts and is omitted by Eusebius of Caesarea (4th century), Hesychius of Jerusalem (5th century), Severus of Antioch (5th century) and possibly Origen (3rd century).

It is included in the Majority/Byzantine Text (over 1,500 manuscripts of Mark), Family 13, Codex Alexandrinus (5th century), Codex Bezae (5th century), Codex Ephraemi (5th century), Codex Koridethi (9th century), Athous Lavrensis (9th century), Codex Sangallensis 48 (9th century), minuscules: 33, 565, 700, 892, 2674. The Vulgate (380) and most of the Old Latin, Syriac Curetonian (5th century), Peshitta (5th century), Bohairic, most Sahidic, Gothic (4th century) and the Harklean Syriac (600). The passage is also cited by the Epistula Apostolorum (120-140), possibly Justin Martyr (160), Diatessaron (160–175 ), Irenaeus (180), Hippolytus (died 235), Vincent of Thibaris (256), De Rebaptismate (258), Acts of Pilate (4th century), Fortunatianus (350) and the Apostolic Constitutions (4th century)

Due to its presence within most manuscripts within the Byzantine text-type, it is also a characteristic of Byzantine printed editions of the New Testament such as the texts of Maurice A. Robinson & Willia1 Timothy 3:16m G. Pierpont, The Greek New Testament According to the Majority Text (Hodges-Farstad) and the Eastern Orthodox Patriarchal text.

=== God was manifest in the flesh (1 Timothy 3:16) ===
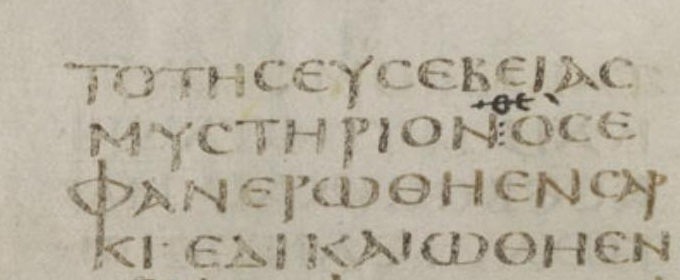
1 Tim 3:16 in the Codex Sinaiticus. The main text reads "hos", while the reading "theos" was added above it.

One noteworthy variant within the Textus Receptus is the reading "God" (theos) in 1 Timothy 3:16, as it concerns a very important theological point. This reading is not found in the earliest manuscripts known today, which instead read "who" (hos), which is why modern versions do not contain the word "God" in this verse.

The reading "God" is supported most Byzantine text-type manuscripts, Codex Athous Lavrensis (8th century), Minuscule 81 (11th century), Minuscule 1739 (10th century), Minuscule 614 (13th century), Gregory of Nyssa (4th century), Didymus (4th century), John Chrysostom (4th century), Euthalius (4th century) and Theodoret (5th century), while the reading "who" is found in the Codex Sinaiaticus (4th century), Alexandrinus (5th century), Ephraemi Rescriptus (5th century), Gothic manuscripts, Origen (3rd century) and Epiphanus (4th century). Critics argue that the Sinaiticus, Alexandrinus and Ephraemi Rescriptus were corrected by later scribes to add the reading "theos".

=== It is hard for thee to kick against the pricks (Acts 9:5-6) ===
The reading "It is hard for thee to kick against the pricks" is found in the Textus Receptus in Acts 9:5, which is lacking in most Greek manuscripts. Erasmus admitted himself that these words were not found in the Greek manuscripts he had access to, however decided to include the words due to their presence in the Latin Vulgate. These words are found in verse 4 instead of verse 5 in two Greek manuscripts: 431 and Codex Laudianus. They are also found in the Palestinian Syriac manuscripts alongside in the writings of Augustine and Petilianus. While these words are found in verse 5 as in the Textus Receptus in the Vetus Latina manuscripts, Vulgate manuscripts and in the writings of Ambrose (339 – 4 April 397) and Lucifer of Cagliari (died 370).

After these words, the Textus Receptus contains the reading "And he trembling and astonished said, Lord, what wilt thou have me to do? And the Lord said unto him". These words are found in the 7th century Harclean Syriac version, the Latin Vulgate, Vetus Latina manuscripts alongside the 4th or 5th century Coptic Codex Glazier. However, there are no extant Greek manuscripts today to include these words.

Some such as Clark have argued that the words "It is hard for thee to kick against the pricks" should be included in Acts 9 because they fit Lukan style more accurately. Nevertheless, Bruce M. Metzger has argued that these words are more likely added by copyists trying to harmonize Acts 9 later accounts of Paul's conversion.

=== Other controversial readings ===
Verse	Variant	Witnesses to contain the same reading as the TR reading	Witnesses against the TR reading	Other information
Mark 9:44 and 9:46	Some manuscripts omit these verses in their entirety.	Alexandrinus (5th century), Bezae (5th century), Cyprius (9th century), Koridethi (9th century), the Latin Vulgate, the Byzantine Majority text.	Vaticanus (4th century), Sinaiticus (4th century), Ephraemi Rescriptus (5th century), Regius (8th century), Washingtonianus (5th century), Family 1	
John 5:3–4	Some manuscripts omit most of the words in these verses.	The Byzantine Majority text (most manuscripts of John), Including Tischendorfianus III (9th century), Petropolitanus (9th century) and Vaticanus 354 (10th century). It is also quoted by Tertullian (3rd century).	Papyrus 66 (3rd century), Papyrus 75 (3rd century), Codex Sinaiticus (4th century, original hand), Codex Alexandrinus (5th century, original hand), Codex Vaticanus (4th century), Codex Ephraemi Rescriptus (5th century, original hand), and Codex Regius (8th century).	
John 7:8	Some manuscripts read "not" instead of "yet" as in the Textus Receptus	Papyrus 66 (3rd century), Papyrus 75 (3rd century), Codex Vaticanus (4th century), Codex Regius (8th century), Codex Borgianus (5th century), Codex Washingtonianus (late 4th/early 5th century), Codex Athous Lavrensis (9th century), Harklean Syriac (7th century), Family 1 (12th-14th centuries), Family 13 (11th-15th centuries), Uncial 070 (6th century), Uncial 0105 (5th/6th century), Uncial 0250 (9th century).	Codex Bezae Cantabrigiensis (5th century), Codex Sinaiticus (4th century), Codex Cyprius (9th century), Minuscule 1241 (12th century), Bohairic (Coptic version, 3rd/4th century), Latin Vulgate (4th century, translated by Jerome).	Metzger argued that although the word "yet" is found 3rd century Papyri, it was still likely added to avoid an inconsistency with the narrative.
Acts 23:9	Some manuscripts omit the words "let us not fight against God" found in the Textus Receptus	Most manuscripts of the Byzantine text-type (majority of all Greek manuscripts of Acts), including H, L, P.	This phrase, which also appears in Acts 5:39, does not appear in – Papyrus 74 (7th century), Codex Sinaiticus (4th century), Codex Alexandrinus (5th century, original hand), Codex Vaticanus (4th century), Codex Ephraemi Rescriptus (5th century, original hand), Codex Laudianus (6th century), and Codex Athous Lavrensis (9th century).	
Revelation 1:8	The Textus Receptus adds the words "the beginning and the ending".	This phrase appears in: 2344, Codex Sinaiticus (4th century), Old Latin manuscripts, the Latin Vulgate (4th century), and 20 other Greek minuscules	All other witnesses to Revelation	Metzger argued for the TR reading to be a harmonization from Revelation 21:6
Revelation 6:12	The Textus Receptus adds the words "and, lo" before the word "earthquake".	Alexandrinus (5th century) 296, 2066, Vulgate (4th century) and Primasius (6th century)	Codex Sinaiticus (4th century), Codex Ephraemi Rescriptus (5th century), Codex Vaticanus (4th century), 1006, 1611, 1854, 2053, 2344, some of the Old Latin, Harklean Syriac, Armenian and Ethiopian	
Revelation 15:3	The TR reads "Holy" instead of "nations" or "ages".	A few Greek witnesses (296, 2049) and several Latin writers, such as: Tyconius (4th century), Cassidorus (6th century), Apringius (6th century) and the earliest commentary on Revelation from Victorinus of Pettau (3rd century).	The reading "nations" is found in A, P, 046, 051, most minuscules, some Old Latin manuscripts, Coptic, Armenian and Ethiopian manuscripts. The reading "ages" is found in C, p47, 94, 469, 1006, 1611, the Vulgate, Harklean Syriac and many other Greek manuscripts.	
Revelation 22:21	Inclusion of the word "Amen" at the end	046, 051, Sinaiticus, almost all Greek minuscules, Harklean Syriac, Coptic, Armenian, Ethiopian manuscripts	Alexandrinus, 1006, 2065, 2432, Codex Fuldensis and some Old Latin manuscripts	

== Variants within the Textus Receptus editions ==
Although the Textus Receptus tradition is very uniform, there are some variants between the different editions of the Textus Receptus. There are around 283 differences between the editions of Scrivener and Stephanus, while the number is 190 between the editions Scrivener and Beza. Most of these variants are insignificant, and often deal with spelling differences, word order or other minor differences.

The following examples are from F.H.A Scrivener, who listed the variants between the Textus Receptus editions:

- Beza adds "de" after "husteron", which is lacking in the text of Stephanus in Mark 1:21´.
- Beza reads "kaleseis" instead of "kalesousi" in Matthew 1:23. Beza's reading is only supported by Codex D.
- Unlike Stephanus, Beza includes the words "tou theou" after "agapen" in 1 John 3:16. This reading is also found in the Complutensian Polyglot.
- Beza omits the word "hoti" in Matthew 9:33, which is found in the text of Stephanus.
- Stephanus includes the word "amen" at the end of Mark 16:20, which is also omitted by Beza and Erasmus. This reading is found in the Complutensian Polyglot.
- Beza and Elzevir read "apothanontos", while Stephanus reads "apothanontes" in Romans 7:6. The reading of Beza has been proposed to have been supported by John Chrysostom (347 – 14 September 407), but it is absent from the existing Greek manuscripts. However Beza's argument that Chrysostom's manuscript included the reading "apothanontos" has been disputed as being a misinterpretation of his commentary, as there are places where Chrysostom's commentaries contain the common Greek reading of "apothanontes". Beza argued that later authors had interpolated the reading into Chrysostom's commentary.

== English translations from the Textus Receptus ==
- Tyndale New Testament 1526–1530
- Coverdale Bible 1535
- Matthew Bible 1537
- Taverner's Bible 1539
- Great Bible 1539
- Geneva Bible 1560–1644
- Bishops' Bible 1568
- Douay–Rheims Bible 1582, 1610, 1749–1752. Base translation is from the Vulgate but 1749–52 editions onwards (Challoner revisions) contain major borrowings from the Tyndale, Geneva and King James versions.
- King James Version 1611, 1613, 1629, 1664, 1701, 1744, 1762, 1769, 1850
- English Dort Version 1657, English translation of the Statenvertaling by Theodore Haak
- Quaker Bible 1764
- Webster's Revision 1833
- Young's Literal Translation (YLT) 1862, 1887, 1898
- Rotherham's Emphasized Bible (EBR) 1872 edition.
- Cambridge Paragraph Bible 1873 edition of the KJV in paragraph format, edited by F. H. A. Scrivener.
- Julia E. Smith Parker Translation 1876
- New King James Version (NKJV) 1982 (New Testament 1979). With an anglicized version originally known as the "Revised Authorized Version".
- Green's Literal Translation 1985. Included in The Interlinear Translation 1986.
- Third Millennium Bible 1998
- New Cambridge Paragraph Bible 2005 edition of the KJV, paragraph format with modernised spelling; edited by David Norton.
- Modern English Version 2014
- Literal Standard Version 2020
- Simplified KJV 2022
- King James Version 2023 Edition 2023

== See also ==
Other text-types

- Alexandrian text-type

Other articles

- Minuscule 177 – manuscript close to Textus Receptus
- King-James-Only Movement
- Textual criticism
- Biblical manuscripts
- List of major textual variants in the New Testament

== Sources ==
- Martin Arhelger, Die Textgrundlage des Neues Testaments, 2006 (in German)
- Martin Arhelger, Die Textgrundlage des Neuen Testaments (2008), pp. 74–79 – differences between editions of Textus Receptus
- Bruce M. Metzger, Bart D. Ehrman, The Text of the New Testament: Its Transmission, Corruption and Restoration, Oxford University Press, 2005.
- Jacob van Bruggen. The Ancient Text of the New Testament. Winnipeg, Man.: Premier, 1976. ISBN 0-88756-005-9
- Pickering, Wilbur N. The Identity of the New Testament Text. Rev. ed. Nashville, Tenn.: T. Nelson Publishers, 1980. ISBN 0-8407-5744-1 pbk.
- W. W. Combs, Erasmus and the Textus Receptus, DBSJ 1 (Spring 1996): 35-53.
- Daniel B. Wallace, Some Second Thoughts on the Majority Text. Bibliotheca Sacra 146 (1989): 270-290.
- James White. King James Only Controversy, Can You Trust the Modern Translations? Bethany House, 1995.
- Edward F. Hills. The King James Version Defended. Des Moines, Iowa, The Christian Research Press, 1984. An online version of Hills' book is available here and here.
- Martin Heide: Der einzig wahre Bibeltext? Erasmus von Rotterdam und die Frage nach dem Urtext, 5. Auflage Nürnberg: VTR, 2006, ISBN 978-3-933372-86-4.
- H. J. de Jonge, Daniel Heinsius and the Textus Receptus of the New Testament
- S. P. Tregelles, The Printed Text of the Greek New Testament, London 1854.
