= Codex Basilensis A. N. IV. 4 =

Minuscule 2815
- New Testament manuscript
- Name: Basilensis A.N.IV.4
- Text: Acts, Pauline epistles
- Date: 12th century
- Script: Greek
- Now at: Basel University Library
- Size: 15 cm x 10 cm
- Type: Byzantine text-type
- Category: V

Codex Basilensis A. N. IV. 4, known as Minuscule 2815 (in the Gregory-Aland numbering), α 253 (Soden), formerly labelled as 2^{ap} in all catalogues, but subsequently renumbered by Aland, is a Greek minuscule manuscript of the New Testament, dated paleographically to the 12th century.

== Description ==
The codex contains a complete text of the Acts of the Apostles, General epistles, and Pauline epistles, 216 parchment leaves (15 by 10 cm). Written in one column per page, 27 lines per page. Written on a parchment in an elegant minuscule. It contains short introduction to the books.

The Greek text of the Gospels is a representative of the Byzantine text-type. Hermann von Soden classified it as I^{b1}. Aland placed it in Category V. In Pauline epistles text is close to the codices 206, 429, 522 and 1891.

In 1 Corinthians 2:14 it reads πνευματος (omit του θεου) along with Minuscule 216, 255, 330, 440, 451, 823, 1827, and syr^{p}.

In Hebrews 12:20 it has additional reading η βολιδι κατατοξευθησεται.

== History of the codex ==
The manuscript belonged to the Preaching Friars, then to Amerbach, a printer of Basle.

This codex was used by Desiderius Erasmus in his first edition of his Novum Testamentum (1516). In result its readings became a basis for the Textus Receptus. Erasmus grounded on this copy, and he calls it exemplar mire castigatum. His binder cut off a considerable part of the margin.

It was examined by Mill, Battier, and Wettstein.

NA27 cited it only in 1 Cor 11,23.

The codex is located now at the Basel University Library (Cod. A.N.IV.4), at Basel.

== See also ==
- List of New Testament minuscules (2001–)
- Textual criticism
