= Confession of the Ethiopian Eunuch =

Scene from the Bible

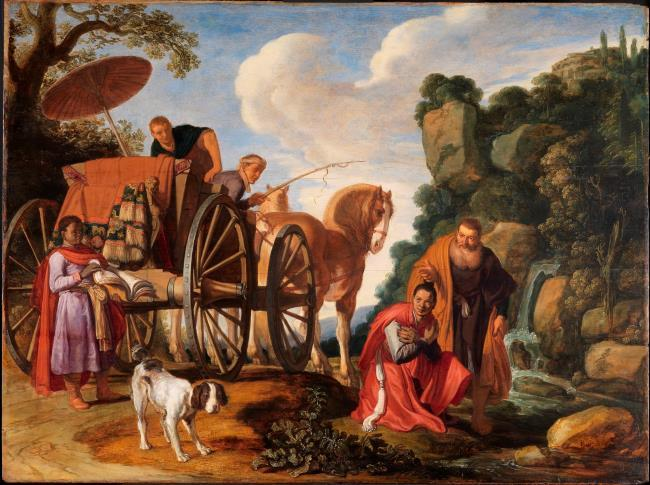
The Baptism of the Eunuch, Pieter Lastman

The confession of the Ethiopian eunuch is a variant reading in Acts 8:37, widely seen by textual critics to be a later interpolation into the text. It is found in the King James Version due to its existence within the Textus Receptus.

It reads in the King James Version as thus:

And Philip said, If thou believest with all thine heart, thou mayest. And he answered and said, I believe that Jesus Christ is the Son of God.

In the Greek of the Textus Receptus, the verse reads thus:

ειπεν δε ο φιλιππος ει πιστευεις εξ ολης της καρδιας εξεστιν αποκριθεις δε ειπεν πιστευω τον υιον του θεου ειναι τον ιησουν χριστον
Eipen de ho Philoppos, "ei pisteueis ex olēs tēs kardias, exestin." Apokritheis de eipen, "pisteuō ton huion tou Theou einai ton Iēsous Christos."

The variant is not found in the majority Greek manuscripts, including the earliest ones such as Papyrus 45, Codex Sinaiaticus and the Vaticanus. Most modern translations such as the ESV, NEB, NIV, NLT, the CEV among others put the verse within the footnotes. However, the verse remains in the body of the text within some translations such as the KJV, KJ21 and the NKJV. Its omission has a UBS confidence rating of A. However, the verse has been defended by advocates of the King James Only movement and the Textus Receptus position.

Acts 8:37 is among the most noteworthy variants found within the Textus Receptus in addition to the Comma Johanneum, the long ending of Mark, the Pericope Adulterae, the reading "God" in 1 Timothy 3:16 and the "book of life" in Revelation 22:19.

== Textus Receptus ==
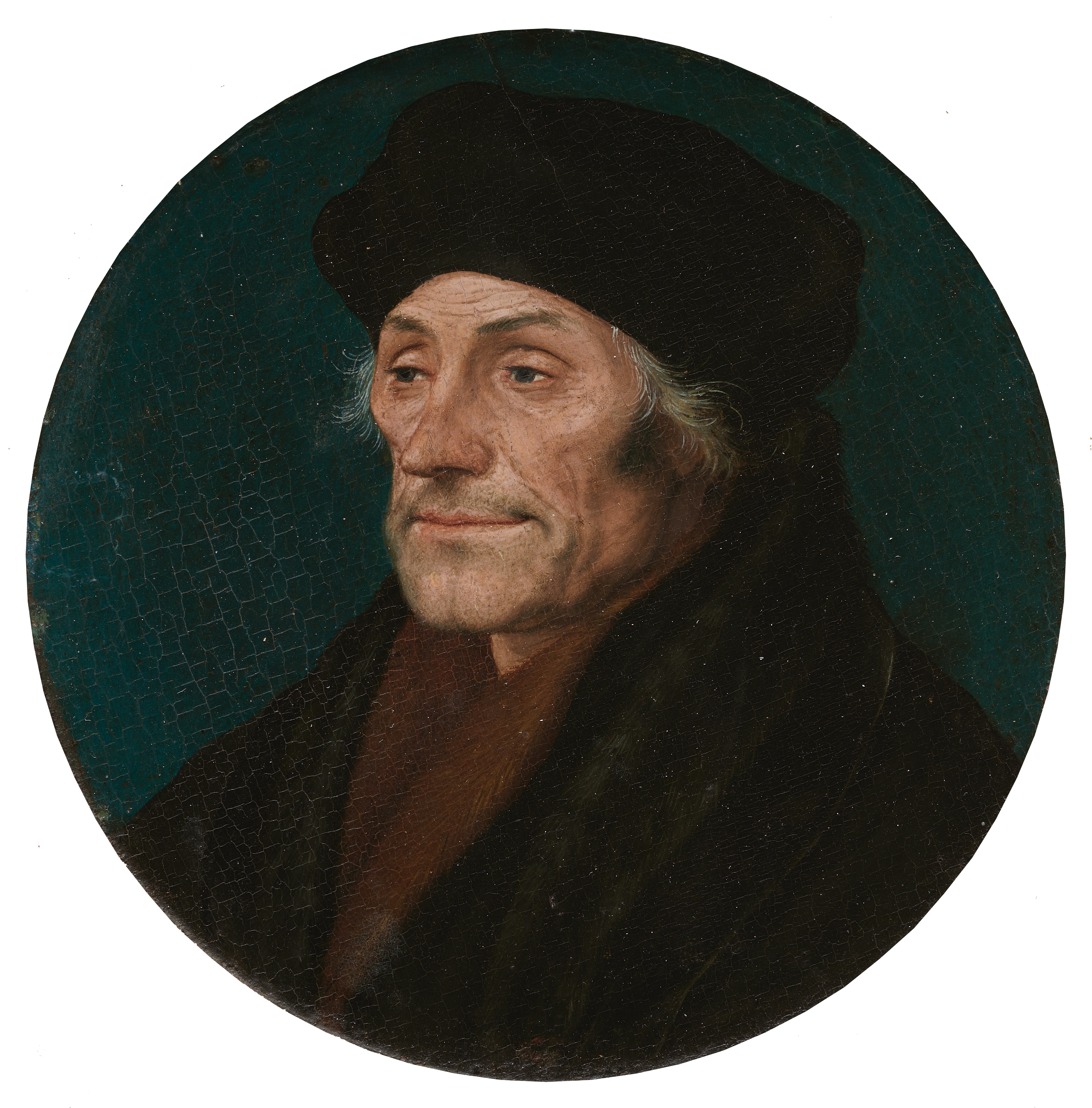
Erasmus added the confession of the Eunuch into the Textus Receptus

The confession of the Ethiopian Eunuch found its way into popular translations such as the King James version due to its inclusion within the Textus Receptus made by Erasmus of Rotterdam (1466 – 1536). Erasmus himself decided to include the verse in his edition of the Greek text due to its presence in the Latin Vulgate of his day and due to being in the margin of Minuscule 2816 (15th century), which he used in his compilation of the Textus Receptus.

Erasmus argued that its omission could be explained by "carelessness of scribes". However, modern scholarship sees it as a later addition to the text of the New Testament.

== History ==
Although Erasmus saw the variant as authentic, arguing that it was omitted from Greek manuscripts accidentally, it has generally been assumed that the verse was initially a margin added by those who found the narrative of Acts 8 lacking, which later found its way into the body of the text.

== Manuscripts ==
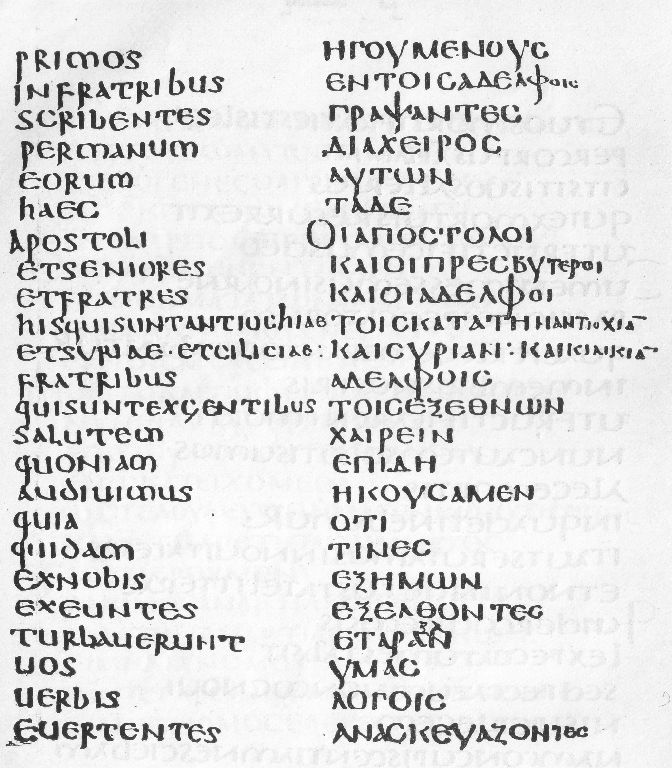
Codex laudianus is the earliest Greek manuscript to contain the variant

The verse is lacking from most Greek manuscripts such as P45,74 א A B C 33 and 614. The first early appearances of the variant exist in the Old Latin manuscripts, and begins to only appear in the Greek around the 6th century.

1. Excludes the passage: It is missing from the manuscripts 𝔓^{45} (3rd century), 𝔓^{74} (7th century), Codex Sinaiticus (4th century), Vaticanus (4th century), Alexandrinus (5th century), Ephraemi Rescriptus (5th century), Codex Athous Lavrensis (8th-9th century) and a multitude of other codices and cursives. It is missing from most Byzantine text-type manuscripts. It is also omitted by most Syriac copies and some Vulgate manuscripts.
2. Includes the passage: A few Greek manuscripts such as Codex Laudianus (c. 550) and some miniscules include the verse. It is found in the Codex Glazier (4-5th century), the Harclensis Syriac (7th century), some Old Latin and Vulgate manuscripts alongside some Ethiopian, Georgian and Armenian manuscripts. The confession of the Ethiopian eunuch is also quoted by many early Western writers, such as Ireaneus (130 – c. 202), Cyprian (210 – 258), Ambrose (339 – 397), Augustine (354 – 430), Pacian (310–391 AD) and Bede (672/3 – 735).
3. Includes the passage within the margin: Minuscule 2816 (15th century) contains the passage within the margin. This was used by Erasmus in his compilation of the TR.

== See also ==
- Acts 8
- Baptism
- Comma Johanneum
- List of New Testament verses not included in modern English translations
- Luke 22:43–44
