= Manuel de Almeida (disambiguation) =

Manuel de Almeida (1580–1646) was a Portuguese Jesuit priest and missionary.

Manuel de Almeida may also refer to:

- Manuel Antônio de Almeida (1831–1861), Brazilian journalist and writer
- Manuel Quintas de Almeida (1957–2006), lieutenant and presidential guard in São Tomé and Príncipe
- Manuel de Almeida (equestrian) (born 1993), Brazilian dressage rider
- Manuel de Almeida (singer), Portuguese singer, see The Rough Guide to the Music of Portugal

== See also ==
- Almeida (disambiguation)
