= Minuscule 525 =

- New Testament manuscript
- Name: Liber Canonicus 122
- Text: Gospels
- Date: 15th century
- Script: Greek-Slavic
- Now at: Bodleian Library
- Size: 31 cm by 22 cm
- Type: Byzantine text-type
- Category: V
- Note: marginalia

Minuscule 525 (in the Gregory-Aland numbering), ε 513 (in the Soden numbering), is a Greek-Slavic diglot minuscule manuscript of the New Testament, on a parchment. Palaeographically it has been assigned to the 15th century. It has marginalia. Scrivener labelled it by number 491.

== Description ==
The codex contains the complete text of the four Gospels on 312 parchment leaves (size 31 cm by 22 cm). It is written in two columns per page, 31-22 lines per page.

The text is divided according to the κεφαλαια (chapters), whose numbers are given at the margin (in Latin), and their τιτλοι (titles of chapters) at the top of the pages.

It contains prolegomena, tables of the κεφαλαια (tables of contents) before each Gospel, lectionary markings at the margin, liturgical books with hagiographies (Synaxarion and Menologion) at the end, subscriptions at the end of each Gospel, numbered στιχοι, and portraits of the Evangelists.

== Text ==
The Greek text of the codex is a representative of the Byzantine text-type. Hermann von Soden classified it to the textual family K^{x}. Aland placed it in Category V.

According to the Claremont Profile Method it represents mixed Byzantine text in Luke 1, K^{x} in Luke 10, and Textus Receptus in Luke 20 (almost identical).

== History ==
The Slavic text was written in 1429 by Gabriel, a monk, in Moldavia. Another later hand added the Greek text.

The manuscript once belonged to M. Aloys. Canonici, together with the manuscripts 522, 523, and 524, then to Bandinelli from Venice, and in 1817 was acquired by the Bodleian Library.

The manuscript was added to the list of New Testament minuscule manuscripts by F. H. A. Scrivener (491) and C. R. Gregory (525). Gregory saw it in 1883.

It is currently housed at the Bodleian Library (MS. Canon. Gr. 122) in Oxford.

== See also ==
- List of New Testament minuscules
- Biblical manuscript
- Textual criticism
