= Almeida =

Almeida may refer to:

== People ==
- Almeida (surname)
- Almeida Garrett (1799–1854), Portuguese poet, playwright, novelist and politician

== Places ==
- Almeida, Boyacá, a town and municipality in Colombia
- Almeida Municipality, Portugal
  - Almeida, Portugal, a town in Almeida Municipality
- 17040 Almeida, an asteroid

== In warfare ==
- Siege of Almeida (1762), during the Seven Years' War
- Siege of Almeida (1810), during the Napoleonic Wars in Portugal
- Blockade of Almeida (1811), during the Napoleonic Wars in Portugal

== Other uses ==
- Almeida Theatre, a theatre in the UK
- Almeida Recebida, a bible version

== See also ==
- Almeidas Province, Colombia
- Almeidaea (fungi) Cif. & Bat. 1962, genus of fungi in Chaetothyriaceae family
