= Andreas text-type =

The Andreas text-type is a form of the text of the Book of Revelation found in some manuscripts of Revelation, it is named after Andreas of Caesarea (563–614), whose manuscript followed this text-type. The Andreas text-type has also been called a subtype of the Majority Text in Revelation, which is divided into the Koine form of Revelation and the Andreas type of Revelation.

Manuscripts belonging to the Andreas text-type are primarily found in manuscript of Andreas' commentary although there exists Andreas manuscripts which do not contain the commentary.

Andreas manuscripts form one third of all Greek manuscripts of Revelation.

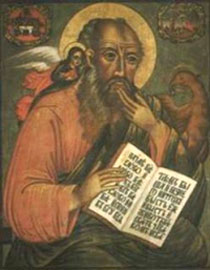
Andreas of Caesarea

== Witnesses ==
Andreas' commentary is among the oldest Greek commentaries on Revelation. Most subsequent Eastern Christian commentators of the Book of Revelation have drawn heavily upon Andrew and his commentary, which was preserved in about 100 Greek manuscripts, and translated into Armenian, Georgian, and Slavonic. His commentary was so influential that it preserved the specific Andreas text type of Revelation.

The earliest possible witness to the Andreas text-type in Revelation is from the Codex Sinaiticus revisor, who seems to have followed the Andreas text-type. Schmid numbered around 83 witnesses to the text, these include unicials such as 25, 88, 205, 209 and 632.

The Andreas text was used by Erasmus in his creation of the Textus Receptus due to the usage of Minuscule 2814 and thus the text of Revelation in most Reformation-era translations follows the Andreas text-type.

== See also ==
- Caesarean text-type

== Sources ==
- Andrew of Caesarea: Commentary on the Apocalypse. The Fathers of the Church, vol. 123. Translated by Eugenia Scarvelis Constantinou. Catholic University of America Press. 2011. ISBN 978-0813201238.
