= Minuscule 2060 =

- New Testament manuscript
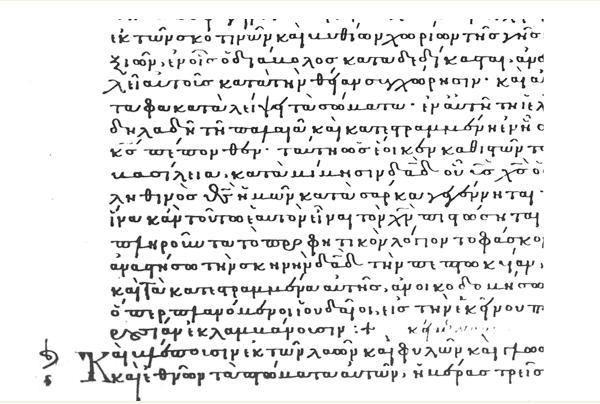
- Rev. 11:7-8.9
- Text: Book of Revelation
- Date: 1331
- Script: Greek
- Now at: Vatican Library
- Size: 27.5 x 21 cm
- Category: none

Minuscule 2060 (in the Gregory-Aland numbering), Av^{42} (von Soden), is a Greek minuscule manuscript of the New Testament, on 105 parchment leaves (27.5 by 21 cm). It is dated by a colophon to the year 1331. Gregory labelled it as 153^{r}, Scrivener as 114^{r}.

== Description ==
The codex contains the Book of Revelation with homilies of St. John Chrysostom to the Gospel of John, and the Revelation commentary by Andrew of Caesarea, altogether 369 leaves. Its text is written in one column per page, in 21 lines per page. Revelation is at the end (pages 265–369).

Kurt Aland did not place its biblical Greek text in any Category. It was not examined by the Claremont Profile Method.

The text of the codex was collated by Hoskier.

The manuscript is currently housed at the Vatican Library (Ms. 542) in Rome.

== See also ==
- List of New Testament minuscules
- Biblical manuscript
- Textual criticism
