= Minuscule 523 =

- New Testament manuscript
- Name: Liber Canonicus 36
- Text: Gospels
- Date: 14th century
- Script: Greek
- Now at: Bodleian Library
- Size: 25.5 cm by 19 cm
- Type: Byzantine text-type
- Category: V
- Note: full marginalia

Minuscule 523 (in the Gregory-Aland numbering), ε 145 (in the Soden numbering), is a Greek minuscule manuscript of the New Testament, on a parchment. Palaeographically it has been assigned to the 14th century. Scrivener labelled it by number 489. It was adapted for liturgical use, with full marginalia.

== Description ==
The codex contains the complete text of the four Gospels on 270 parchment leaves (size 25.5 cm by 19 cm). It is written in one column per page, 22 lines per page.

The text is divided according to the κεφαλαια (chapters), whose numbers are given at the margin, and their τιτλοι (titles of chapters) at the top of the pages. There is also a division according to the Ammonian Sections, with references to the Eusebian Canons.

The tables of the κεφαλαια (tables of contents) are placed before every Gospel, it contains lectionary markings at the margin (for liturgical use), incipits, αναγνωσεις (lessons), Synaxarion, Menologion, and pictures.

It lacks the Pericope Adulterae (John 7:53–8:11).

== Text ==
The Greek text of the codex is a representative of the Byzantine text-type. Hermann von Soden classified it to the textual family K^{x}. Aland placed it in Category V.

According to the Claremont Profile Method it represents textual family K^{x} in Luke 1 and Luke 20. In Luke 10 no profile was made.

== History ==
The manuscript once belonged to M. Aloys. Canonici, together with the manuscripts 522, 524, and 525, then to Bandinelli from Venice, and in 1817 was acquired by the Bodleian Library.

The manuscript was added to the list of New Testament minuscule manuscripts by Scrivener (489) and Gregory (523). Gregory saw it in 1883.

It is currently housed at the Bodleian Library (MS. Canon. Gr. 36) in Oxford.

== See also ==
- List of New Testament minuscules
- Biblical manuscript
- Textual criticism
