= Minuscule 524 =

- New Testament manuscript
- Name: Liber Canonicus 112
- Text: Gospels
- Date: 12th century
- Script: Greek
- Now at: Bodleian Library
- Size: 14.5 cm by 11 cm
- Type: Byzantine text-type
- Category: V
- Note: full marginalia

Minuscule 524 (in the Gregory-Aland numbering), ε 265 (in the Soden numbering), is a Greek minuscule manuscript of the New Testament, on a parchment. Palaeographically it has been assigned to the 12th century. It was adapted for liturgical use. It has full marginalia.

Scrivener labeled it by number 490.

== Description ==
The codex contains the complete text of the four Gospels on 184 parchment leaves (size 14.5 cm by 11 cm). The text is written in one column per page, 21-28 lines per page.

The text is divided according to the κεφαλαια (chapters), whose numbers are given at the margin and their τιτλοι (titles of chapters) at the top of the pages. There is also a division according to the Ammonian Sections, with references to the Eusebian Canons (written below Ammonian Section numbers).

It contains the Epistula ad Carpianum, the tables of the κεφαλαια (tables of contents) before each Gospel, lectionary markings at the margin (for liturgical use), incipits, αναγνωσεις (for the Pascha 1497-1522 added by a later hand), Synaxarion, Menologion, and pictures.

== Text ==
The Greek text of the codex is a representative of the Byzantine text-type. Hermann von Soden classified it to the textual family K^{1}. Aland placed it in Category V. According to the Claremont Profile Method it represents the textual family K^{x} in Luke 10 and Luke 20. In Luke 1 it has mixed Byzantine text.

== History ==
It is dated by the INTF to the 12th century.

The manuscript once belonged to M. Aloys. Canonici, together with the manuscripts 522, 523, and 525, then to Bandinelli from Venice, and in 1817 was acquired by the Bodleian Library.

The manuscript was added to the list of New Testament minuscule manuscripts by F. H. A. Scrivener (490) and C. R. Gregory (524). Gregory saw it in 1883.

It is currently housed at the Bodleian Library (MS. Canon. Gr. 112) in Oxford.

== See also ==
- List of New Testament minuscules
- Biblical manuscript
- Textual criticism
