= Minuscule 92 =

- New Testament manuscript
- Name: Codex Faeschii 1
- Text: Gospel of Mark †
- Date: 10th century
- Script: Greek
- Now at: Basel University Library
- Size: 26 cm by 20 cm
- Type: Byzantine text-type
- Category: V
- Note: marginalia

Minuscule 92 (in the Gregory-Aland numbering), A^{12} (Soden), known as Codex Faeschii 1, is a Greek minuscule manuscript of the New Testament, on parchment leaves. Palaeographically it has been assigned to the 10th century. It has marginalia.

== Description ==
The codex contains the text of the four Gospel of Mark, with a commentary, on 141 parchment leaves (26 cm by 20 cm). The text is written in one column per page, 31-32 lines per page.

There was no text's division according to the κεφαλαια (chapters) or Ammonian Sections in the original manuscript, but there were the τιτλοι (titles of chapters) at the top of the pages. Latin κεφαλαια (chapters) were added by a later hand.

It contains table of the κεφαλαια (table of contents) before the text of the Gospel, pictures, a commentary of Victorinus and scholia at the margin to the Catholic epistles. The text of the Catholic epistles is only in some passages.

== Text ==
The Greek text of the codex is a representative of the Byzantine text-type. Aland placed it in Category V.

== History ==
In 1485 the manuscript belongs to John Camerarius, bishop of Worms. It once belonged to Andreas Faesche in Basel. It was examined by Johann Jakob Wettstein and Dean Burgon. C. R. Gregory saw it in 1885.

The manuscript is dated by the INTF to the 10th century.

It is currently housed at the Basel University Library (O. II. 7) in Basel.

== See also ==
- List of New Testament minuscules
- Biblical manuscript
- Textual criticism
