= Minuscule 2816 =

- New Testament manuscript
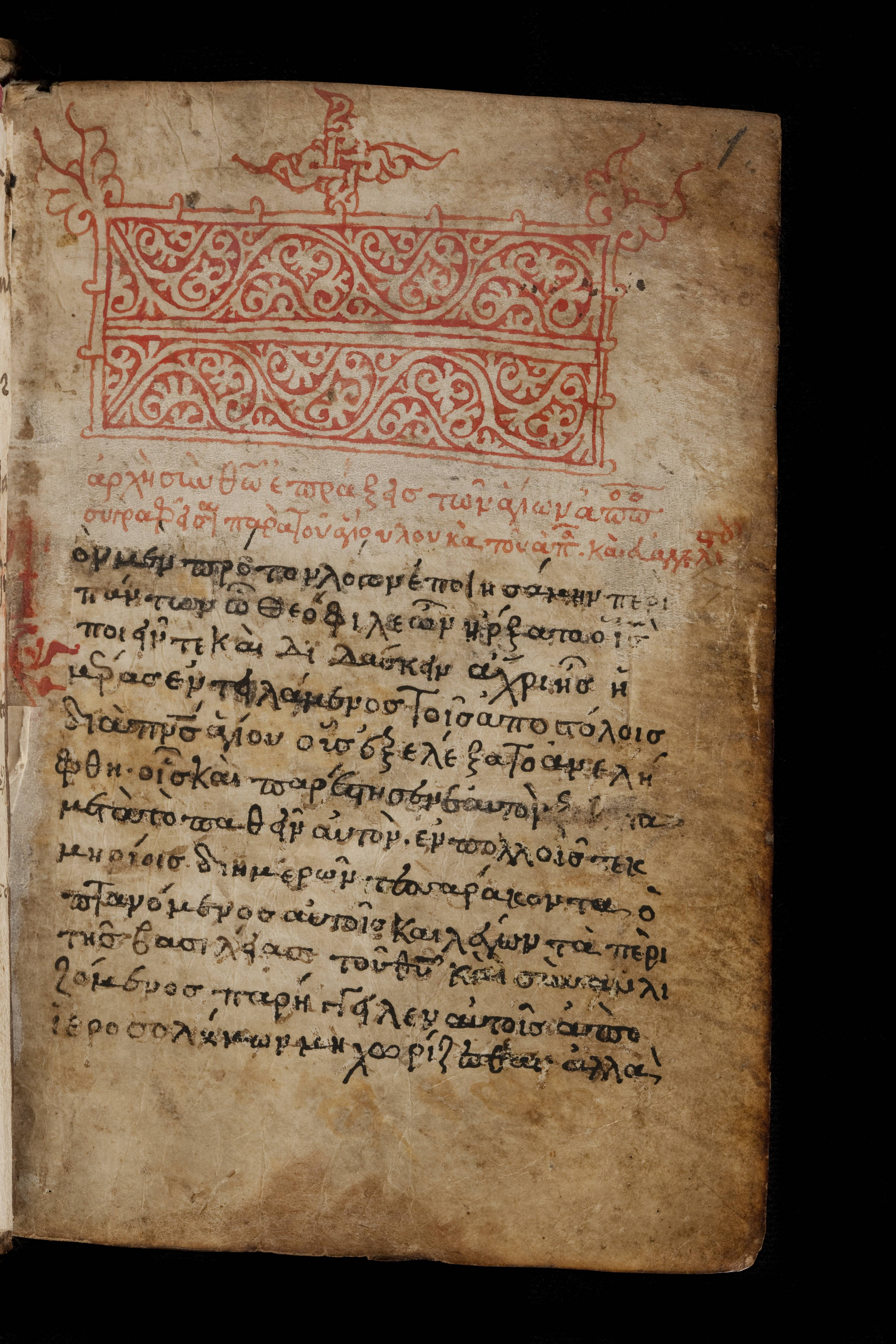
- Beginning of Acts
- Name: Codex Basilensis A.N.IV.5
- Text: Acts, Paul, CE
- Date: 15th century
- Script: Greek
- Now at: Basel University Library
- Size: 15.4 x 11 cm
- Type: Byzantine text-type
- Category: V
- Hand: hardly written

Codex Basilensis A.N.IV.5, known as Minuscule 2816 (in the Gregory-Aland numbering), α597 (in von Soden numbering), formerly labelled as 4^{ap} in all catalogs, but subsequently renumbered by Aland, is a Greek minuscule manuscript of the New Testament, paleographically had been assigned to the 15th century.

== Description ==
The codex contains a complete text of the Acts of the Apostles, Pauline epistles, and General epistles (the Pauline epistles preceding the General), on 287 parchment leaves (15.4 by 11 cm) in elegant minuscule. The text is written in one column per page, 17-19 lines per page. It contains

Hardly written by several hands, and full of contractions.

The order of books; Acts of the Apostles, Pauline epistles, and Catholic epistles.

== Text ==
The Greek text of the Gospels is a representative of the Byzantine text-type. Aland placed it in Category V.

In James 1:12 it has textual variant ο θεος (God) along with the manuscripts 33^{vid}, 323, 945, 1739, vf, syr^{p}, against the Byzantine ο κυριος (the Lord).

In Hebrews 3:3 it reads μεχρι τελους κατασχωμεν βεβαιαν for κατασχωμεν. The reading is supported only by it^{c}.

== History of the codex ==
The manuscript belonged to the monastery of the Dominican Order. It was borrowed by Desiderius Erasmus and used by him in his edition of the Novum Testamentum (1516). Sometimes he used some of its marginal readings instead of main text readings (e.g. Acts 8:37; 15:34; 24:6-8). In result some of its readings became a part of the Textus Receptus.

It was examined by Battier (for John Mill), Wettstein.

Currently the codex is located at the Basel University Library (Cod. A.N.IV.5), at Basel.

== See also ==
- List of New Testament minuscules (2001–)
- Textual criticism
- Biblical manuscript
