= Minuscule 2814 =

- New Testament manuscript
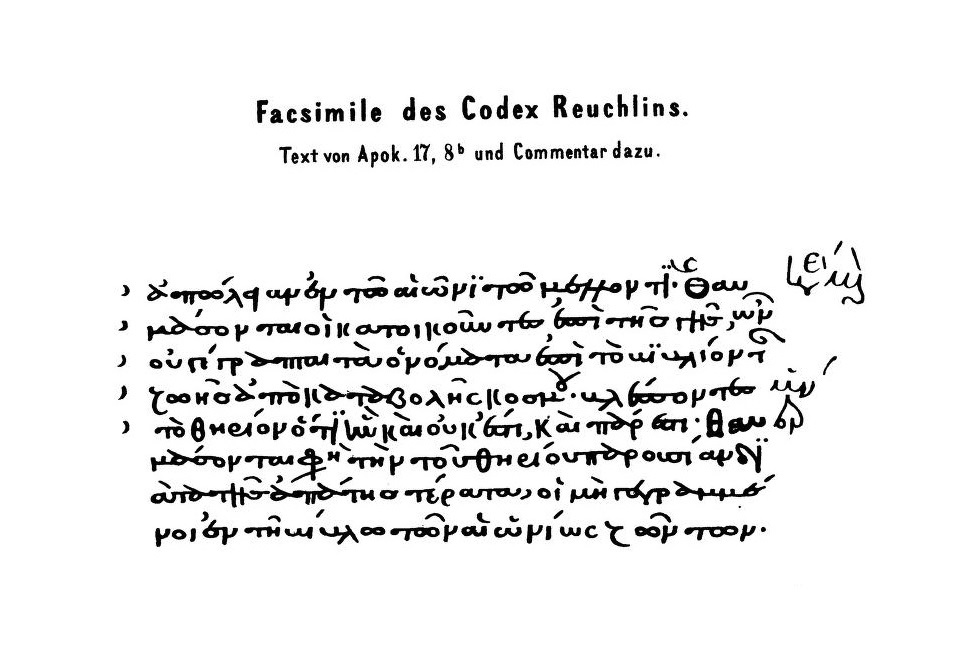
- Facsimile of Franz Delitzsch (1861) with text of Rev 17,8
- Text: Book of Revelation
- Date: 12th century
- Script: Greek
- Now at: University of Augsburg
- Type: Byzantine text-type
- Category: V

Minuscule 2814 (in the Gregory-Aland numbering), Aν^{20} (in Soden numbering), formerly labelled as 1^{rK} in all catalogues, but subsequently renumbered as 2814 by Aland, is a Greek minuscule manuscript of the New Testament, dated palaeographically to the 12th century.

== Description ==
The codex contains only the Book of Revelation with a commentary by Andreas of Caesarea. The last six verses were lost (22:16–21). Its text is written on a parchment in minuscule, in 1 column per page, 20 lines per page.

Its biblical Greek represents the 'Andreas text', which is related to, but not a pure representative of, the Byzantine text type. Aland placed it in Category V.

- Rev. 1:5

λύσαντι ἡμᾶς ἐκ — P^{18}, א^{c}, A, C, 2020, 2081, 2814
λούσαντι ἡμᾶς ἀπο — P, 046, 94, 1006, 1859, 2042, 2065, 2073, 2138, 2432

== History of the codex ==
This codex was chiefly used by Desiderius Erasmus as a basis for his first edition of the Novum Testamentum (1516). It was the only Greek manuscript of the Book of Revelation used by Erasmus. Erasmus translated the missing last six verses from the Vulgate back to Greek for his editions. As a result its readings plus his retranslation became a basis for the Textus Receptus. Erasmus borrowed the manuscript from Reuchlin, but it was lost for many years until rediscovered in 1861 by Franz Delitzsch.

Kurt Aland included the manuscript to the critical apparatus in the 25th edition of Novum Testamentum Graece (1963).

Formerly the codex was located in Harburg (Öttingen-Wallersteinsche Bibliothek), and was transferred together with the whole library to the library of the University of Augsburg (I, 1, 4 (0), 1).

== See also ==
- List of New Testament minuscules (2001–)
- Novum Instrumentum omne
- Textual criticism
