= Almeida Recebida =

The Almeida Recebida is a Portuguese Bible version based on the Received Text (Textus Receptus) manuscripts, as opposed to the Westcott and Hort revisions. The 1848 version of the Almeida Bible was also based on the Received Text, but its language was old. The language of the Almeida Recebida is updated to a more recent Portuguese.
