= Minuscule 522 =

- New Testament manuscript
- Name: Liber Canonicus 34
- Text: New Testament
- Date: 1515/1516
- Script: Greek
- Now at: Bodleian Library
- Size: 23 cm by 16.5 cm
- Type: Byzantine text-type
- Category: V/III
- Note: full marginalia

Minuscule 522 (in the Gregory-Aland numbering), ε 145 (in the Soden numbering), is a Greek minuscule manuscript of the New Testament, on a paper. It is dated by a colophon to the year 1515 or 1516. Scrivener labelled it by number 488. It was adapted for liturgical use.

== Description ==
The codex contains the entire of the New Testament on 319 paper leaves (23 cm × 16.5 cm (9.1 in × 6.5 in)) with only one lacuna in the Apocalypse 2:11-23. The order of books: Gospels, Pauline epistles (Philemon, Hebrews), Acts, Catholic epistles, and Apocalypse. The scribe was unfamiliar with Greek.

The text written in one column per page, 25 lines per page. The breathings and accents are given correctly with very few exceptions.

The text is divided according to the κεφαλαια (chapters), whose numbers are given at the margin (added by later hand in Latin), and their τιτλοι (titles of chapters) at the top of the pages. The text of the Gospels has also a division according to the smaller Ammonian Sections, with references to the Eusebian Canons.

The tables of the κεφαλαια (tables of contents) are placed before each of book, lectionary markings at the margin (for liturgical use), incipits, αναγνωσεις (lessons), Synaxarion, Menologion, and some pictures. It has Oecumenius and Euthalius prolegomena.

Errors

In Apocalypse, there were 13 instances of errors by homoioteleuton, errors of itacism are few. N ephelkystikon before a consonant 3 times, 2 times it lacks before hiatus.

== Text ==
The Greek text of the codex is a representative of the Byzantine text-type except Acts and Catholic epistles. Aland placed it in Category V. The text of the Acts and Catholic epistles Aland placed in III Category. Wisse did not examine this manuscript by using his profile method.

It has some peculiar readings in Book of Revelation.

== History ==
According to the note on folio 319 the manuscript was written in Mirandola in 1515 (or 1516) for the wish Giovanni Francesco Picus of Mirandola by Michael Damascenus from Crete. The manuscript once belonged to M. Aloys. Canonici, together with the manuscripts 523, 524, and 525, then to Bandinelli from Venice, and in 1817 was acquired by the Bodleian Library.

The manuscript was added to the list of New Testament minuscule manuscripts by Scrivener (488) and Gregory (522). Gregory saw it in 1883. It was examined, described, and collated by Scrivener.

It is currently housed at the Bodleian Library (MS. Canon. Gr. 34) in Oxford.

== See also ==
- List of New Testament minuscules
- Biblical manuscript
- Textual criticism
