= Synopsis of Holy Scripture =

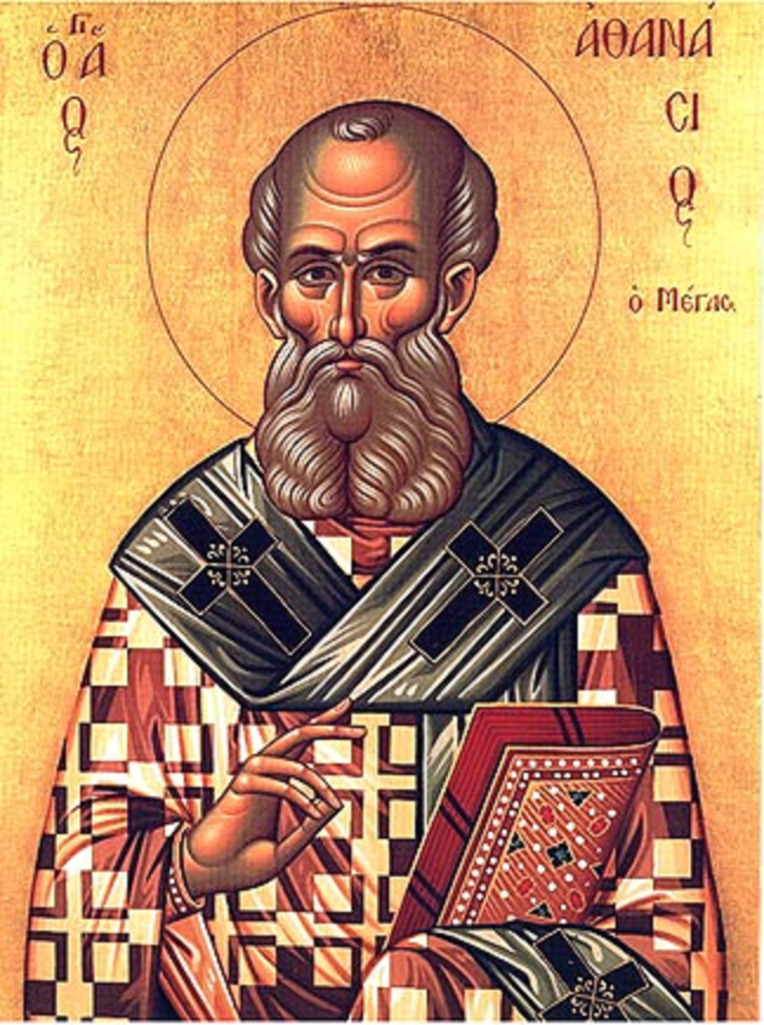
Athanasius of Alexandria, to whom the Synopsis Scripturae Sacrae has been wrongly attributed to.

Synopsis of Holy Scripture (Latin: Synopsis Scripturae Sacrae) is an early Christian text in Greek, which has been falsely attributed to Athanasius. The writing has been variously dated to either the 4th, 5th or 6th centuries, although most often to the 6th century.

== Significance ==
=== Textual critical ===
The Synopsis Scripturae Sacrae has been cited by F.H.A Scrivener as among the two only Greek Patristic references to the Johannine Comma in 1 John 5:7 (A variant within the Epistle of John primarily found only in Latin manuscripts). The other Greek reference being the Disputation against Arius, made by another Pseudo-Athanasian author.

The Synopsis Scripturae Sacrae is also one of the few Greek references to the Pericope Adulterae within the Patristic era alongside Didymus the Blind, the Apostolic Constitutions and the Didascalia. He refers to John 7:53-8:11 while discussing Nicodemus at the end of John 7.

=== Canon ===
The Synopsis Scripturae Sacrae contains a list of the Old Testament canon. He lists the canon in accordance with the Hebrew Alphabet, separating Judges and Ruth, but not including Esther. The author identified Esther, Sirach, Judith, Tobit and the Wisdom of Solomon as non-canonical.
