= Andreas of Caesarea =

Greek theological writer; bishop of Caesarea

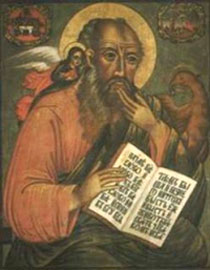
Andreas of Caesarea

Andrew of Caesarea (Greek: Ἀνδρέας Καισαρείας; AD 563–614) was a Greek theological writer and bishop of Caesarea in Cappadocia. Karl Krumbacher assigned him to the first half of the sixth century. He is variously placed by other scholars, from the fifth to the ninth century. However, today it is unquestionable that his life spanned the late sixth/early seventh centuries.

== Works ==
His principal work is a commentary on the Book of Revelation and is the oldest Greek commentary on that book written by a recognized Father of the Church. (The very first Greek commentary on Revelation may barely predate Andrew's work and is attributed to Oikoumenios.) Most subsequent Eastern Christian commentators of the Book of Revelation have drawn heavily upon Andrew and his commentary, which was preserved in about 100 Greek manuscripts, and translated into Armenian, Georgian, and Church Slavonic. Andrew's most important contribution was that he preserved many existing Eastern traditions associated with Revelation, both oral and written. His commentary was so influential that it preserved a specific text type for Revelation, known as the Andreas type.

An English translation by Eugenia Constantinou was published in 2011.

== See also ==
- Minuscule 2814
- Minuscule 2060
