= Basel University Library =

University library in Basel, Switzerland

- Universitätsbibliothek Basel
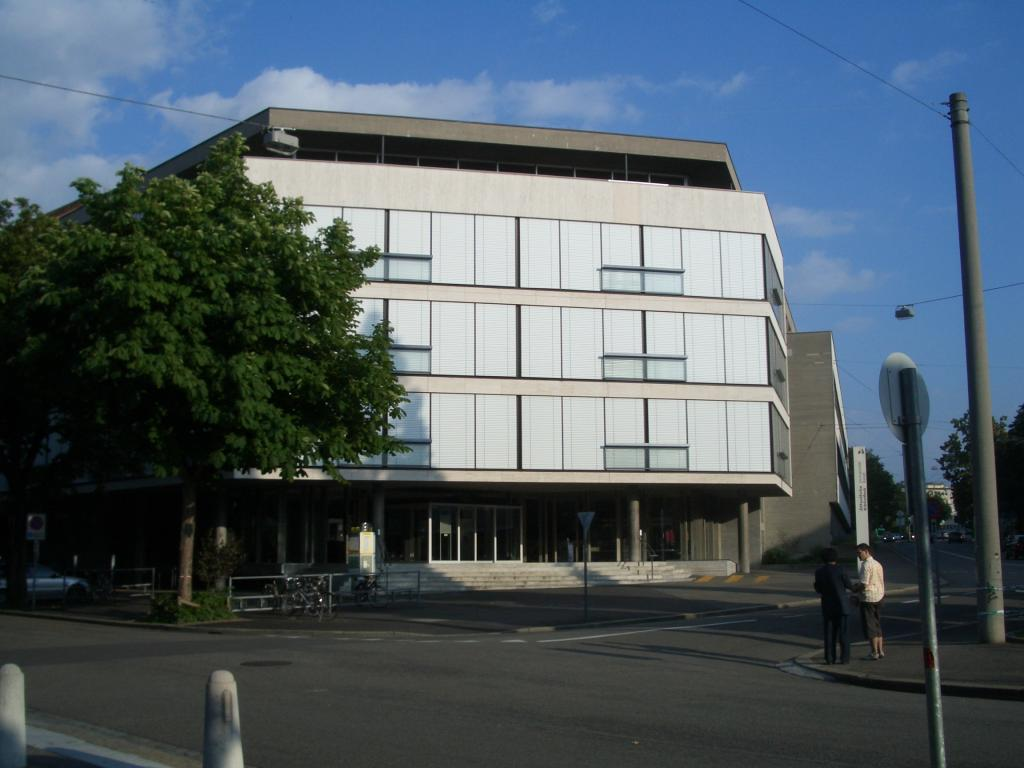
- Basel University Library
- 47.55974737995541°N 7.581153363606122°E
- Location: Basel, Switzerland
- Type: Academic library
- Established: 1460s

Other information
- Affiliation: University of Basel
- Website: https://ub.unibas.ch/de

Basel University Library, officially the Public Library of the University of Basel (German: Öffentliche Bibliothek der Universität Basel, abbreviated UB), is the central library of the University of Basel. It also serves as the Cantonal Public Library (German: Kantonsbibliothek) for the city of Basel. With over 3 million items in its collections, the library is one of the largest in Switzerland. Founded in 1471, it is also one of the oldest in Europe.

The local name for the library is Universitätsbibliothek (literally translated: University Library). It contains more than 3,000,000 documents, including 1,750 medieval manuscripts and numerous incunabula dating from the time of the Council of Basel (1431–87). The majority of library resources are freely available to the public and most of its books can be electronically accessed and ordered.

== Historical background ==
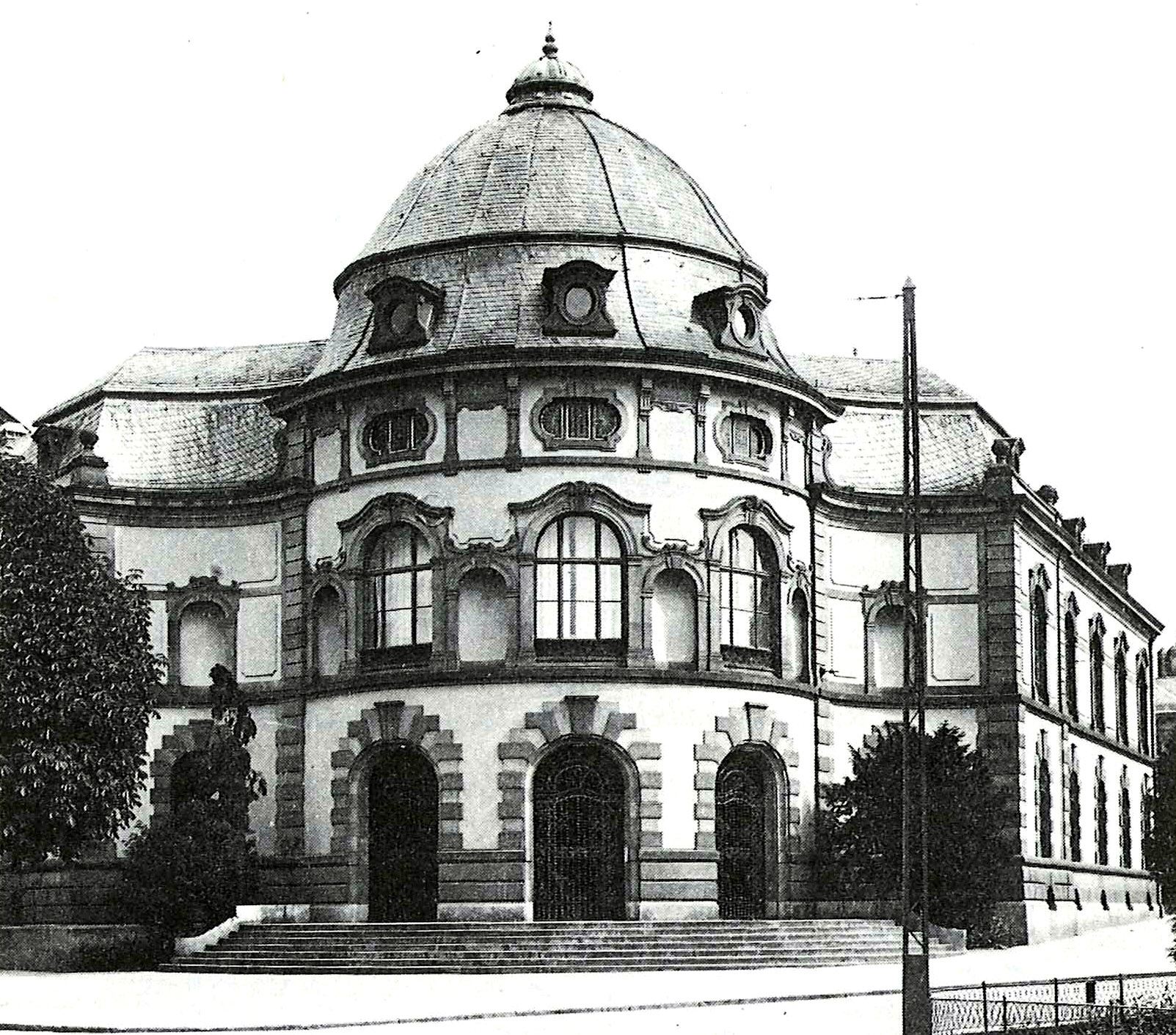
Basel University Library in 1896

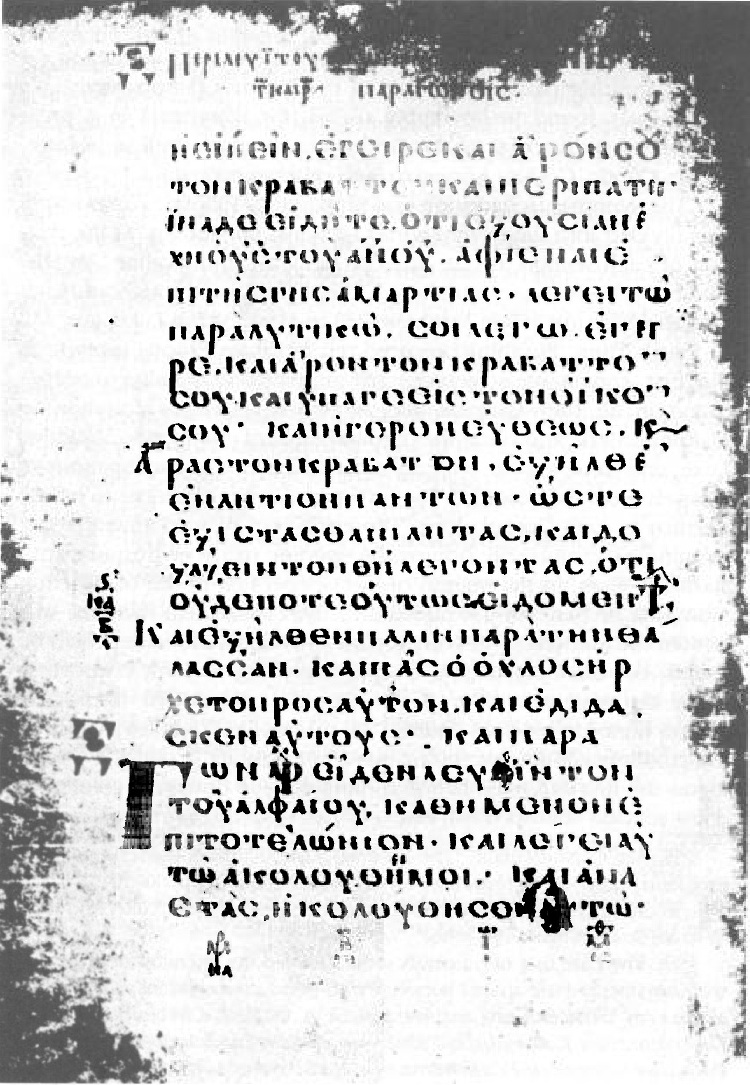
Codex Basilensis – Mark 2,9-14

The first written evidence of the library's existence dates from the year 1471; its early date makes it one of the most important libraries of the country. The library began compiling its catalogue in volumes from 1559 to 1889, when began organizing its material by a so-called „Zettelform“ (or, roughly, list form, where the items of the catalogue can be found by author name). This was later changed to a subject heading catalogue in 1939.

In 1886, ten years before the library was moved to its own building, the first curatorial librarian was employed. Between 1962 and 1968, the library's current location was found. The library of medicine was later founded, in 1978, as a subsidiary of the original library and which can now be found in the Basel University Hospital (earlier: Basel Cantonal Hospital).

- 1471 – first evidence of existence of the library
- 1559 – first catalogue
- 1866 – newspaper of librarian
- 1889 – catalogue on cards
- 1896 – library relocated to the bigger building
- 1939 – keyword catalogue
- 1981 – informatic catalogue
- 1985 – data base
- 1988 – catalog OPAC (Online Public Access Catalog)

== Electronic "revolution" in lending services ==
Computer cataloguing and application was used from 1981 onwards and the first database was installed in 1985. In 1988 the OPAC (Online Public Access Catalogue), the library of the Economics faculty (Wirtschaftswissenschaftliches Zentrum, WWZ,) and the business archive of Switzerland (Schweizerisches Wirtschaftsarchiv, SWA) were also put into service. In 1995 (and continuing to this day) electronic borrowing was activated and the open stacks were put into service. Popular, public access to the internet has been possible for the public since 1997.

== Functions and collections ==
The University Library collects various subject publications without restriction, but focuses on humanities, social and natural sciences, and medicine. If there is scientific interest in non-academic literature, it is included as well. The University Library (along with the departmental libraries) is responsible for the literary provision of research and teaching at the university. The University Library also contains the library of medicine and the library of the Centre for Economic Science (which includes the Swiss economic archive). Many of the departmental libraries are affiliated with the network of German-speaking Switzerland (Informationsverbund Deutschschweiz, IDS). At the same time the University Library serves as canton library for Basel City. In this role it collects all publications by residents of Basel, as well as everything about Basel and its inhabitants (these collected publications are called “Basiliensia”), as an informal dépot legal, a depository library.

- total stock 3,000,000 units
- annual growth 45,000 units
- lendings 250,000 per year

All in all, the university owns more than three million units of media, which places it among the major libraries of Switzerland. Moreover, it is equipped with a rich old stock of enormous historical collections with about 1,750 manuscripts, early printings, music supplies, maps and portraits, mainly from Basel’s convents and its university. The collections are complemented by the faculty libraries, general libraries of the GGG (Gesellschaft für das gute und gemeinnützige Basel: society for the good and non-profit Basel) and a range of special libraries.

== Borrowing information ==
The library is open to anyone older than 14, as well as people who live and work in Switzerland and cross-border regions, members of the university and the EUCOR-universities. Registration and use of the library are free of charge. Books can be ordered online. If the book is either borrowed or not in the stacks, it can directly be taken from the self-service section.

== Miscellaneous ==
Concerning the research of Nietzsche, the University of Basel is the second most important collecting point (preceded by the archive of Nietzsche in Weimar, Germany), because of the amount of resources that can be found about “Nietzsche in Basel” in the wake of Franz Overbeck.

== Manuscripts ==
Manuscripts in the Basel University Library include:

- Basel roll
- Family 1
- Minuscule 92
- Minuscule 817
- Minuscule 2816
- Minuscule 2817
