= Codex Glazier =

Coptic uncial New Testament manuscript

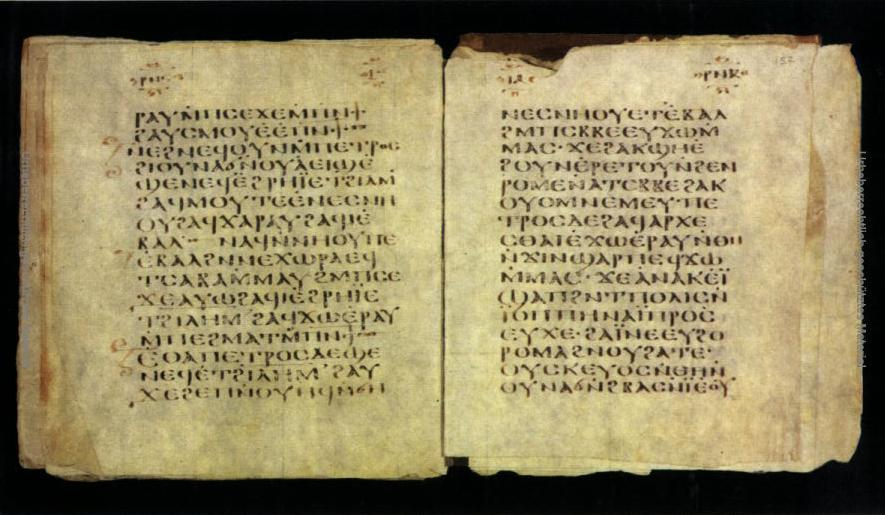
Codex Glazier

Codex Glazier, designated by siglum cop^{G67}, is a Coptic uncial manuscript of the New Testament on parchment. It is dated palaeographically to the 4th or 5th century. Textually it is very close to Greek Codex Bezae. The manuscript is in the collection of the Morgan Library & Museum in New York.

== Description ==
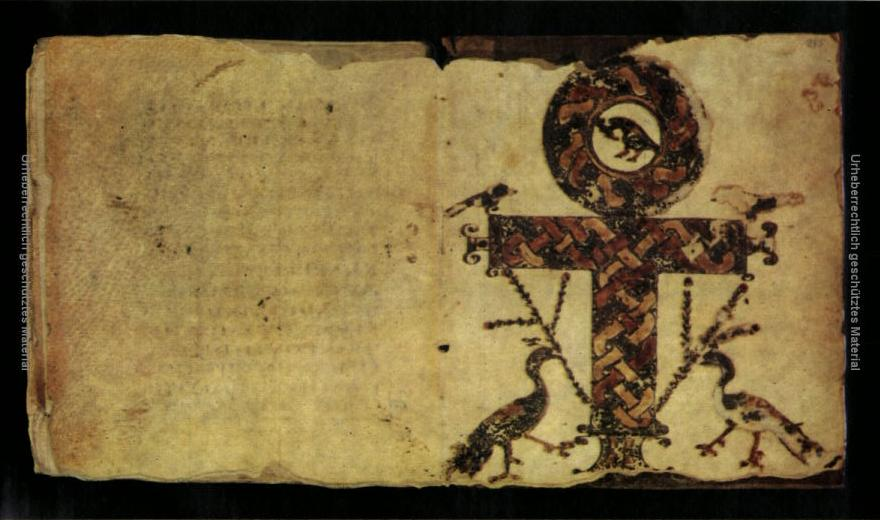
Illuminated cross (crux ansata) at the end of the codex

It contains the text of the Acts of the Apostles 1:1–15:3. The manuscript ends with Acts 15:3 on folio 155 recto while the following page verso has been left blank. The manuscript has some illuminations; at the end of the manuscript, on an additional leaf, it has a picture with a great crux ansata (cross with handle), a motif appearing in Coptic textiles and stone sculptures. The picture is in the colours yellow, red, and brown.

The size of the pages is 12.1 by 10.4 cm. The text is written in one column per page, in 16 lines per page, with wide margins. It has diaereses; the text is divided according to the chapters, whose numbers are given at the left margin. The pages are numbered.

It is written in Middle-Egyptian dialect of Coptic language. Although the manuscript contains only the first half of Acts, its non-fragmentary character is of special significance for the study of the Western text.

The nomina sacra are written in contracted forms.

The text of the codex is a representative of the Western text-type, very close to the Codex Bezae. Currently, it is the main manuscript that supports the text of the Codex Bezae in the Acts. It is also only one Coptic manuscript with stricte Western text.

=== Agreement with Bezae ===
Acts 2:30 αυτου] + κατα σαρκα αναστησαι τον Χριστον και (according to the flesh to raise up the Christ, and)

Acts 2:47 ημεραν] + εν τη εκκλησια (in the church)

Acts 4:24 ακουσαντες] και επιγνοντες την του θεου ενεργειαν;

Acts 5:18 δημοσια] και επορευθη εις εκαστος εις τα ιδια;

Acts 11:2 it contains the long Western variant, contained by D and d only, "who also met them [the brethren] and reported to them the grace of God". The last part of it is supported by similar reading of G67 "and spoke to them of the mercy of God."

Acts 13:44 according to D and d "and when he had made a long discourse about the Lord", G67 has: "But Paul spoke lengthily in the discourse concerning the Lord Jesus."

=== Different readings supported by Old Latin ===
Acts 6:1 men] angel

Acts 7:46 Bezae reads οικω, G67 supports reading θεω;

Acts 8:37 and 9:5b–6a are included.

Acts 12:25 Bezae reads Σαυλος] G67 supports reading ος επεκληθη Παυλος (who was called Paul))

Acts 14:20 Only h and G67, in the report that the disciples gathered around Paul after he was stoned and cast out of the city.

== History ==
The manuscript is dated to the late 4th or early 5th century.

Before 1963 it was part of the private collection of the manuscripts of William S. Glazier, a banker.

In 1983, it was given with the Glazier Collection to the Pierpont Morgan Library. Charles Ryskamp, director of the Morgan Library, described the Glazier Collection as an "important addition to the Morgan Library's". Currently, the book is housed in Berlin's Altes Museum.

Theodore C. Petersen published in 1964 a selection of readings in English translation. He planned to provide a critical edition of the codex, but died in 1966.

The manuscript was examined by Petersen, Haenchen, Weigandt, Bober, Epp, and Schenke. Eldon Jay Epp found several unique readings of the codex. The text of the codex was edited by Schenke in 1991.

The readings of the codex have been incorporated into the apparatus of Nestle-Aland 26th edition of Novum Testamentum Graece.

== Significance ==
Before the discovery of the Codex Glazier, a number of readings of Codex Bezae had support only of later, mixed Western witnesses and no pure witnesses. In such cases always was difficult to decide whether the reading is to be taken as Western or not. The evidence of Codex Glazier allows to separate old Western readings from late reading. It allows to decide with greater assurance.

Codex Bezae has a lacuna in 8:29–10:14. The Old Latin Codex Floriacensis (designated by h), is also lacking in this section up to 9:24a, and after 9:24a. Codex Glazier is an important witness for reconstruction the Western text for this portion. At least 21 reading of Glazier of this portion may represent the Western text.

The manuscript is also important as a witness of the Coptic language, because it is one of few manuscripts that are written in the dialect of Coptic used in Middle Egypt.

== See also ==
- Biblical manuscript
- Coptic versions of the Bible
