= Johannine Comma =

Interpolated phrase in verses 5:7–8 of 1 John

The Johannine Comma (Latin: Comma Johanneum) is a phrase (comma) in verses 5:7–8 of the First Epistle of John, which is seen as an interpolation in the Epistle of John according to modern textual criticism. The text in the King James Version of the Bible reads:

^{7}For there are three that beare record in heaven, the Father, the Word, and the Holy Ghost: and these three are one. And there are three that beare witnesse in earth, the Spirit, and the water, and the blood, and these three agree in one.

— King James Version (1611)

In the Greek Textus Receptus (TR), the comma reads thus:

ἐν τῷ οὐρανῷ, ὁ πατήρ, ὁ λόγος, καὶ τὸ ἅγιον πνεῦμα, καὶ οὗτοι οἱ τρεῖς ἕν εἰσι. καὶ τρεῖς εἰσιν οἱ μαρτυροῦντες ἐν τῇ γῇ.

It became a touchpoint for the Christian theological debate over the doctrine of the Trinity from the early church councils to the Catholic and Protestant disputes in the early modern period.

The words "in heaven, the Father, the Word, and the Holy Ghost: and these three are one" (KJV) found in older translations at 1 John 5:7 are thought by some to be spurious additions to the original text. A footnote in the Jerusalem Bible, a Modern Catholic translation, says that these words are "not in any of the early Greek MSS [manuscripts], or any of the early translations, or in the best MSS of the Vulg[ate] itself." In A Textual Commentary on the Greek New Testament, Bruce Metzger (1975, pp. 716–718) traces in detail the history of the passage, asserting its first mention in the 4th-century treatise Liber Apologeticus, and that it appears in Vetus Latina and Vulgate manuscripts beginning in the 6th century. Modern translations as a whole (both Catholic and Protestant, such as the Revised Standard Version, New English Bible, and New American Bible) do not include them in the main body of the text due to their ostensibly spurious nature.

The comma is mainly only attested in the Latin manuscripts of the New Testament, being absent from the vast majority of Greek manuscripts of the New Testament, the earliest Greek manuscript being from the 14th century. It is also totally absent in the Geʽez, Coptic, Syriac, Georgian, Arabic and from the early pre-12th-century Armenian witnesses to the New Testament. Despite its absence from these manuscripts, it was contained in many printed editions of the New Testament in the past, including the Complutensian Polyglot (1517), the different editions of the Textus Receptus (1516-1894), the London Polyglot (1655) and the Patriarchal text (1904). And it is contained in many Reformation-era vernacular translations of the Bible due to the inclusion of the verse within the Textus Receptus and the Sixto-Clementine Vulgate. In spite of its late date, members of the King James Only movement and those who advocate for the superiority for the Textus Receptus and of the Vulgate have argued for its authenticity.

The Comma Johanneum is among the most noteworthy variants found within the Textus Receptus in addition to the confession of the Ethiopian eunuch, the long ending of Mark, the Pericope Adulterae, the reading "God" in 1 Timothy 3:16 and the "Book of Life" in Book of Revelation 22:19.

== Text ==
The "Johannine Comma" is a short clause found in 1 John 5:7–8.

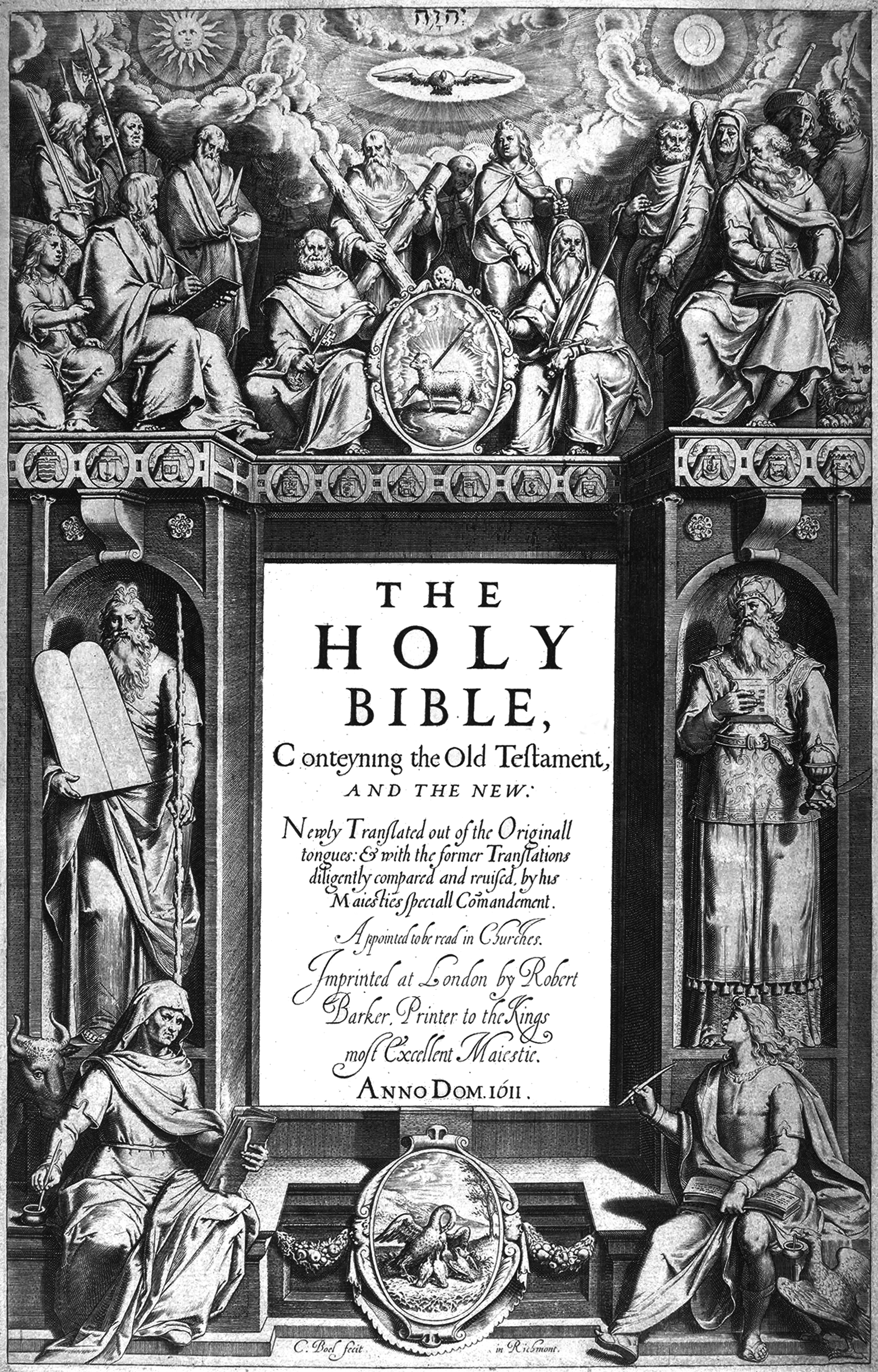
The King James Bible (1611) contains the Johannine comma.

Erasmus omitted the text of the Johannine Comma from his first and second editions of the Greek-Latin New Testament (the Novum Instrumentum omne) because it was not in his Greek manuscripts. He added the text to his Novum Testamentum omne in 1522 after being accused of reviving Arianism and after he was informed of a Greek manuscript that contained the verse, although he expressed doubt as to its authenticity in his Annotations.

Many subsequent early printed editions of the Bible include it, such as the Coverdale Bible (1535), the Geneva Bible (1560), the Douay-Rheims Bible (1610), and the King James Bible (1611). Later editions based on the Textus Receptus, such as Robert Young's Literal Translation (1862) and the New King James Version (1979), include the verse. In the 1500s it was not always included in Latin New Testament editions, though it was in the Sixto-Clementine Vulgate (1592). However, Martin Luther did not include it in his Luther Bible.

The text in the King James Bible reads:

^{7}For there are three that beare record in heaven, the Father, the Word, and the Holy Ghost: and these three are one. And there are three that beare witnesse in earth, the Spirit, and the water, and the blood, and these three agree in one.

— King James Version (1611)

The text (with the Comma in brackets and italicised) in the Latin of the Sixto-Clementine Vulgate reads:

^{7}Quoniam tres sunt, qui testimonium dant [in caelo: Pater, Verbum, et Spiritus Sanctus: et hi tres unum sunt.] ^{8}[Et tres sunt, qui testimonium dant in terra]: spiritus, et aqua, et sanguis: et hi tres unum sunt.

— Sixto-Clementine Vulgate (1592)

The text (with the Comma in brackets and italicised) in the Greek of the Novum Testamentum omne reads:

^{7}ὅτι τρεῖς εἰσιν οἱ μαρτυροῦντες [ἐν τῷ οὐρανῷ πατήρ λόγος καὶ πνεῦμα ἅγιον καὶ οὗτοι οἱ τρεῖς ἕν εἰσι] ^{8}[καὶ τρεῖς εἰσιν οἱ μαρτυροῦντες ἐν τῇ γῇ] πνεῦμα καὶ ὕδωρ καὶ αἷμα καὶ οἱ τρεῖς εἰς τὸ ἕν εἰσιν.

— Novum Testamentum omne (1522; absent in earlier editions)

There are several variant versions of the Latin and Greek texts.

English translations based on a modern critical text have omitted the comma from the main text since the English Revised Version (1881), including the New American Standard Bible (NASB), English Standard Version (ESV), and New Revised Standard Version (NRSV).

== Origin ==
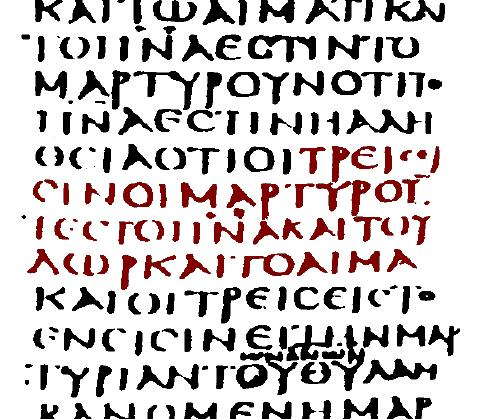
Excerpt from Codex Sinaiticus including 1 John 5:7–9. It lacks the Johannine Comma. The red coloured text says: "There are three witness bearers, the spirit and the water and the blood".

Several early sources that might be expected to include the Comma Johanneum in fact omit it. For example, Clement of Alexandria's (c. 200) quotation of 1 John 5:8 does not include the Comma.

Among the earliest possible references to the Comma appears by the 3rd-century Church Father Cyprian (died 258), who in Unity of the Church 1.6 quoted John 10:30: "Again it is written of the Father, and of the Son, and of the Holy Spirit, 'And these three are one.'" However, some believe that he was giving an interpretation of the three elements mentioned in the uncontested part of the verse.

The first undisputed work to quote the Comma Johanneum as an actual part of the Epistle's text appears to be the 4th-century Latin homily Liber Apologeticus, probably written by Priscillian of Ávila (died 385), or his close follower Bishop Instantius.

== Manuscripts ==
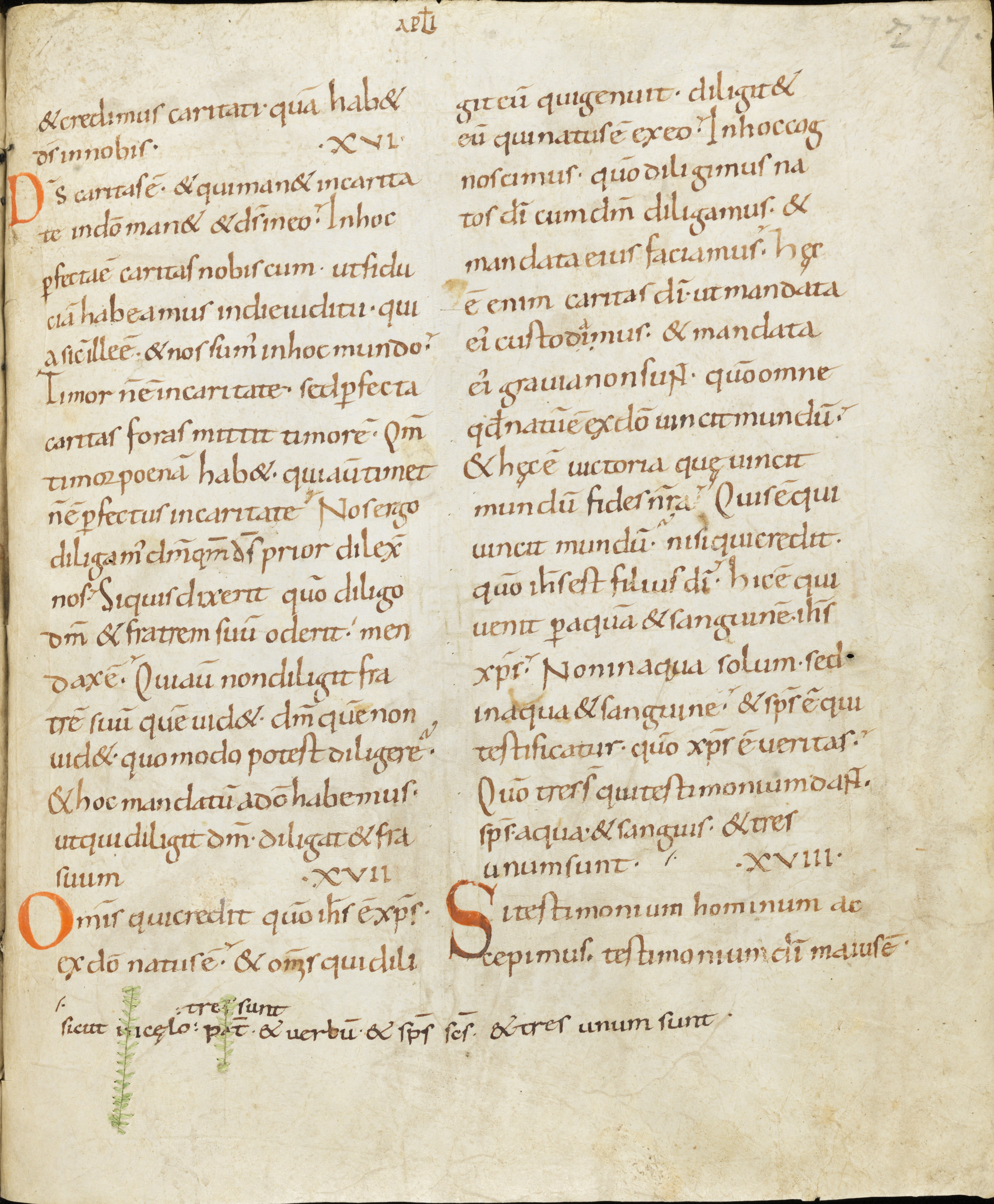
Codex Sangallensis 63 (9th century), Johannine Comma at the bottom: tre[s] sunt pat[er] & uerbu[m] & sps [=spiritus] scs [=sanctus] & tres unum sunt. Translation: "three are the father and the word and the holy spirit and the three are one". The original codex did not contain the Comma Johanneum (in 1 John 5:7), but it was added by a later hand on the margin.

The Comma is not in two of the oldest extant Vulgate manuscripts, Codex Fuldensis and the Codex Amiatinus, although it is referenced in the Prologue to the Canonical Epistles of Fuldensis, and appears in Old Latin manuscripts of similar antiquity.

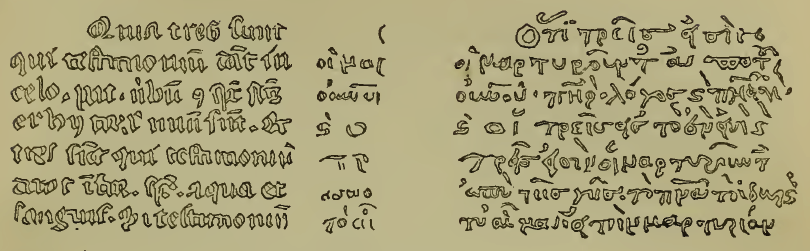
The Johannine comma in the Codex Ottobonianus, earliest Greek manuscript to contain the Comma.

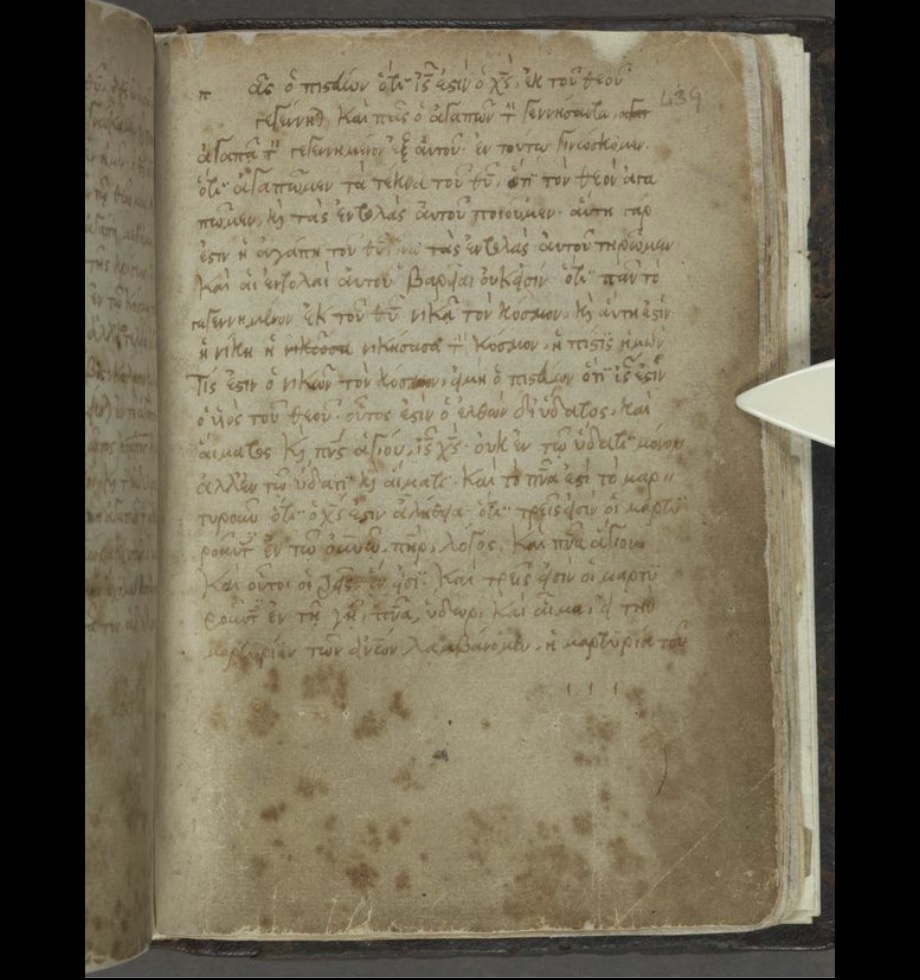
Codex Montfortianus (1520) page 434 recto with 1 John 5 Comma Johanneum.

The earliest extant Latin manuscripts supporting the Comma are dated from the 5th to 7th century. The Freisinger fragment, León palimpsest, besides the younger Codex Speculum, New Testament quotations extant in an 8th- or 9th-century manuscript.

The comma does not appear in the older Greek manuscripts. Nestle-Aland is aware of eight Greek manuscripts that contain the Comma. The date of the addition is late, probably dating to the time of Erasmus. In one manuscript, back-translated into Greek from the Vulgate, the phrase "and these three are one" is absent.

Both Novum Testamentum Graece (NA27) and the United Bible Societies (UBS4) provide three variants. The numbers here follow UBS4, which rates its preference for the first variant as { A }, meaning "virtually certain" to reflect the original text. The second variant is a longer Greek version found in the original text of five manuscripts and the margins of five others. All of the other 500 plus Greek manuscripts that contain 1 John support the first variant. The third variant is found only in Latin manuscripts and patristic works. The Latin variant is considered a trinitarian gloss, explaining or paralleled by the second Greek variant.

1. The Comma in Greek. All non-lectionary evidence cited: Minuscules 61 (Codex Montfortianus, c. 1520), 629 (Codex Ottobonianus, 14th/15th century), 918 (Codex Escurialensis, Σ. I. 5, 16th century), 2318 (18th century) and 2473 (17th century). It is also found in the Complutensian Polyglot (1520) in both Greek and Latin. Its first full appearance in Greek is from the Greek version of the Acts of the Lateran Council in 1215. Although it later appears in the writings of Emmanuel Calecas (died 1410), Joseph Bryennius (1350 – 1431/38) and in the Orthodox Confession of Moglas (1643). There are no full Patristic Greek references to the comma, however, F.H.A. Scrivener mentions three possible allusions in Greek to the comma in the 4th or 5th century from the Synopsis of Holy Scripture, the Disputation with Arius from Pseudo-Athanasius and from an anonymous homily dated to 381.
2. The Comma at the margins of Greek. At the margins of minuscules 88 (Codex Regis, 11th century with margins added at the 16th century), 177 (BSB Cod. graec. 211), 221 (10th century with margins added at the 15th/16th century), 429 (Codex Guelferbytanus, 14th century with margins added at the 16th century), 636 (16th century).
3. The Comma in Latin. testimonium dicunt [or dant] in terra, spiritus [or: spiritus et] aqua et sanguis, et hi tres unum sunt in Christo Iesu. 8 et tres sunt, qui testimonium dicunt in caelo, pater verbum et spiritus. [... "giving evidence on earth, spirit, water and blood, and these three are one in Christ Jesus. 8 And the three, which give evidence in heaven, are father word and spirit."] All evidence from Fathers cited: Clementine edition of Vulgate translation; Pseudo-Augustine's Speculum Peccatoris (V), also (these three with some variation) Cyprian (3rd century), Priscillian (died 385) Liber Apologeticus, Expositio Fidei (4th century), Contra-Varimadum (439-484), Eugenius of Carthage (5th century), Council of Carthage (483), Pseudo-Jerome (5th century) Prologue to the Catholic Epistles, Fulgentius of Ruspe (died 527) Responsio contra Arianos, Cassiodorus (6th century) Complexiones in Ioannis Epist. ad Parthos, Donation of Constantine (8th century). It is also found in the quotations of multiple later medieval writers, including: Peter Abelard (12th century), Peter Lombard (12th century), Bernard of Clairvaux (12th century), Thomas Aquinas (13th century) and William of Ockham (14th century).
4. The Comma in other languages: According to Scrivener, the Johannine Comma is found in a few late Slavonic manuscripts, and also in the margin of the Moscow edition of 1663, published under Alexis of Russia. Due to Latin influence, the Johannine Comma also found its way into the Armenian language after the 12th century under King Haithom. One of the eighteen MSS. used by Zohrab to publish the Armenian Bible had the Comma, and it was quoted in the 13th century in the Armenian synod of Sis alongside being found in Uscan's Armenian translation of the Bible of the 17th century. The Syriac writer Jacob of Edessa (640–708) has been proposed to have referenced the Comma by making a trinitarian reference alongside the water, blood, and Spirit. However, his statements are also seen as possibly referring to the Latin work Against Varimadus, especially with Jacob's mention that the Trinity exists "within us". This suggests Jacob's reference might be to this Latin text rather than a quotation of 1 John 5:7. In Minuscule 460, (a trilingual manuscript) In folio 115v, the Arabic Column reads لأرض (latinized: al-ardh, lit. on earth) in v. 8, but omits the Heavenly Witnesses. On earth being part of the disputed verse. The 14th century German Augsburger Bible mentions the heavenly witnesses after the earthly witnesses. The addition is also in Cod. Sang. 28, an Old French manuscript of the 13th century.

The appearance of the Comma in the manuscript evidence is represented in the following tables:

Latin manuscripts
Date	Name	Place	Other information
5th century	Codex Speculum (m)	Holy Cross Monastery (Sessorianus), Rome, Italy	Vetus Latina, scripture quotations
AD 546	Codex Fuldensis (F)	Fulda, Hesse, Germany	The oldest Vulgate manuscript does not have the verse, it does have the Vulgate Prologue which discusses the verse
5th-7th century	Frisingensia Fragmenta (r) or (q)	Bavarian State Library, Munich, Bavaria, Germany	Vetus Latina, Spanish - earthly before heavenly, formerly Fragmenta Monacensia
7th century	León palimpsest (l) Beuron 67	León Cathedral, Spain	Spanish - "and there are three which bear testimony in heaven, the Father, and the Word, and the Holy Spirit, and these three are one in Christ Jesus" - earthly before heavenly The text is a mixture of readings from the Vetus Latina and from the Vulgate.
8th century	Codex Wizanburgensis	Herzog August Bibliothek Wolfenbüttel	the dating is controversial.
9th century	Codex Cavensis C	La Cava de' Tirreni, Biblioteca della Badia, ms memb. 1	Spanish - earthly before heavenly
9th century	Codex Ulmensis U or σU	British Museum, London 11852	Spanish
AD 927	Codex Complutensis I (C)	Biblical University Centre 31; Madrid	Spanish - purchased by Cardinal Ximenes, used for Complutensian Polyglot, earthly before heavenly, one in Christ Jesus.
8th–9th century	Codex Theodulphianus	Bibliothéque nationale de France, Paris (BnF) - Latin 9380	Franco-Spanish
8th–9th century	Codex Sangallensis 907	Abbey of Saint Gall, Saint Gallen	Franco-Spanish
9th century	Codex Lemovicensis-32 (L)	National Library of France Lain 328, Paris	
9th century	Codex Vercellensis	Rome, Biblioteca Vallicelliana ms B vi	representing the recension of Alcuin, completed in 801
9th century	Codex Sangallensis 63	Abbey of Saint Gall, Saint Gallen	Latin, added later into the margin.
AD 960	Codex Gothicus Legionensis	Biblioteca Capitular y Archivo de la Real Colegiata de San Isidoro, ms 2	
10th century	Codex Toletanus	Madrid, Biblioteca Nacional ms Vitr. 13-1	Spanish - earthly before heavenly
12th century	Codex Demidovianus		A Vulgate manuscript with Old Latin influences.

Greek manuscripts
Date	Manuscript no.	Name	Place	Other information
14th –15th century	629	Codex Ottobonianus 298	Vatican	Original. Diglot, Latin and Greek texts.
14th century	209		Venice, Biblioteca Marciana	The manuscript is written in Greek, however Cardinal Basil Bessarion added to the manuscript a note containing the Johannine Comma in Latin.
c. 1520	61	Codex Montfortianus	Dublin	Original. Articles are missing before nouns.
16th century	918	Codex Escurialensis Σ.I.5	Escorial (Spain)	Original.
c. 12th century	88	Codex Regis	Victor Emmanuel III National Library, Naples	Margin: 16th century
c. 14th century	429	Codex Guelferbytanus	Herzog August Bibliothek, Wolfenbuttel, Germany	Margin: added later
15th century - 16th century	636		Victor Emmanuel III National Library, Naples	Margin: added later
11th century	177	BSB Cod. graec. 211	Bavarian State Library, Munich	Margin: late 16th century or later
17th century	2473		National Library, Athens	Original.
18th century	2318		Romanian Academy, Bucharest	Original. Commentary mss. perhaps Oecumenius
c. 10th century	221		Bodleian Library, Oxford University	Margin: added later
11th century	635		Biblioteca Nazionale Vittorio Emanuele III	This manuscript has sometimes been cited as having the comma added later in the margin. According to Metzger, it was added in the 17th century.

Multilingual and other language manuscripts
Date	Manuscript no.	Name	Place	Other information
13th century	460	Minuscule 460	of St. Micheal de Troyna in Sicily	Multilingual manuscript, the Greek column omits the heavenly witnesses, but the Latin column maintains the dubious verse after the earthly witnesses (v. 8). In the Arabic column, on earth is added (Line 13), being part of the disputed verse.
13th century		Cod. Sangallensis 28	Bern, Burgerbibliothek	This Old French manuscript compiled in the 13th century contains the Johannine Comma in the first column of f. 345v.
14th century		Augsburger Bible		The German Augsburger Bible mentions the heavenly witnesses after the earthly witnesses.
16th century		English MS 81	The John Rylands Library	A manuscript of the Wyclif Bible containing the New Testament. English MS 81 is the source of Lea Wilson's published text of the Wyclif bible. The manuscript contains the Johannine Comma in its main text.
AD 1656				One of the eighteen MSS. used by Zohrab to publish the Armenian Bible had the Comma.

=== Doubtful proposed manuscript attestation ===
The Codex Vaticanus in some places contains umlauts to indicate knowledge of variants. Although there has been some debate on the age of these umlauts and if they were added at a later date, according to a paper made by Philip B. Payne, the ink seems to match that of the original scribe. The Codex Vaticanus contains these dots around 1 John 5:7, which is why some have assumed it to be a reference to the Johannine Comma. However, according to McDonald, G. R, it is far more likely that the scribe had encountered other variants in the verse than the Johannine comma, which is not attested in any Greek manuscript until the 14th century.

No extant Syriac manuscripts contain the Johannine Comma, nevertheless some past advocates of the inclusion of the Johannine comma such as Thomas Burgess (1756-1837) have proposed that the inclusion of the conjuctive participle "and" within the text of 1 John 5:7 in some Syriac manuscripts is an indication of its past inclusion within the Syriac textual tradition.

It is known that Erasmus was aware of a codex from Antwerp which was presented to him at the Franciscan monastery. This manuscript was likely lost during the times of Napoleon, however it was said to have contained the Johannine Comma in the margin, as Erasmus mentions it in his Annotations. Nevertheless, Erasmus doubted the originality of that marginal note within the manuscript and believed that it was a recent addition within it. The exact nature of this manuscript from Antwerp is unknown, scholars such as Mills, Küster and Allen have argued that it was a Greek New Testament manuscript. However, others such as Wettstein have proposed that this was instead a manuscript of the commentary of Bede (672/3 – 26 May 735). Sixtus of Siena says that Erasmus admitted in his annotations that the verse is found in very old Greek manuscripts of Britain, Spain, and Rhodes. Angelo Rocca says that an ancient manuscript in Venice contained the verse. Denis Amelote says that the oldest manuscript that he had seen at the Vatican contained the verse.

== Patristic writers ==
=== Clement of Alexandria ===
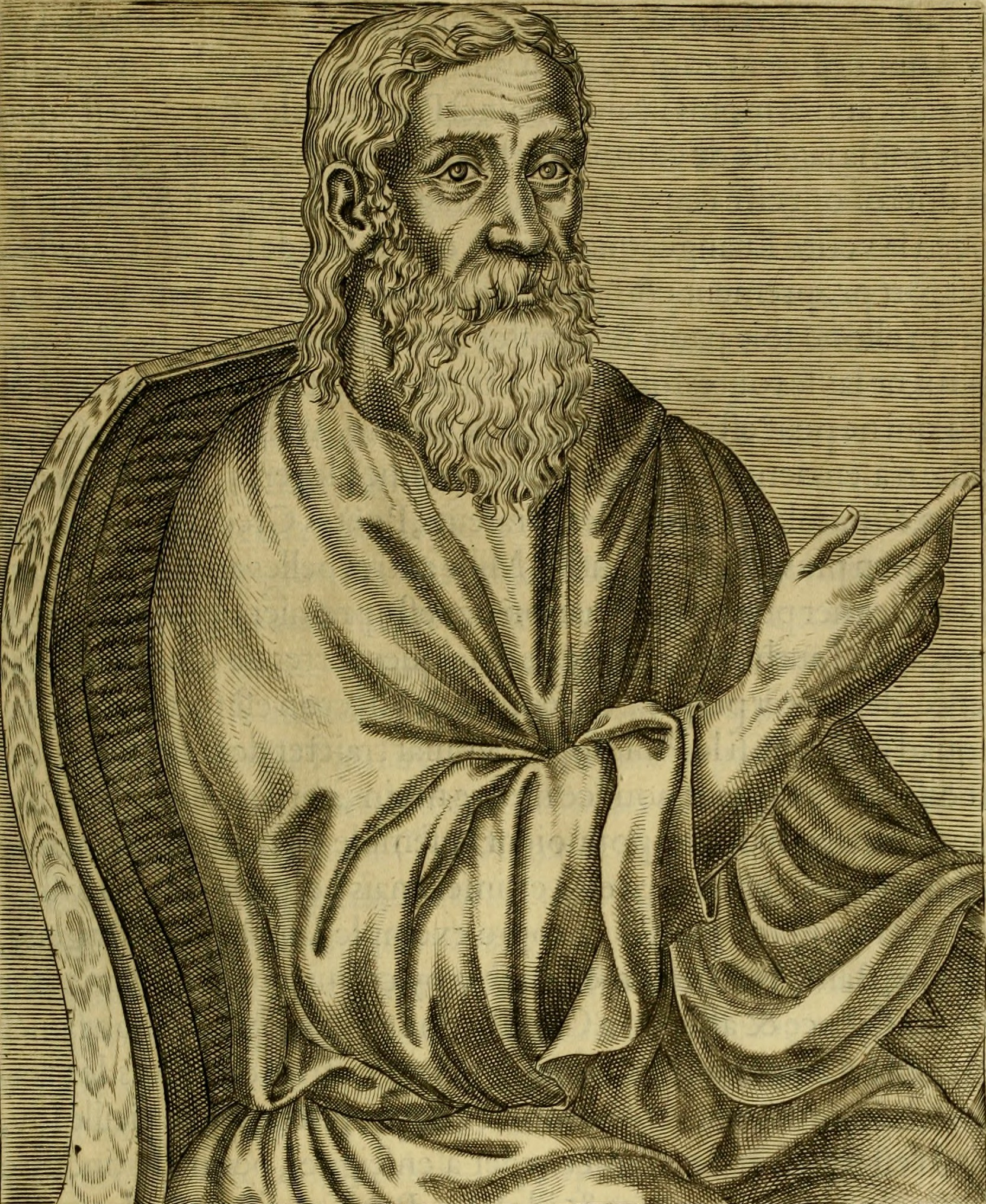
Clement of Alexandria quoted 1 John 5:7 without the comma.

The comma is absent from an extant fragment of Clement of Alexandria (c. 200), through Cassiodorus (6th century), with homily style verse references from 1 John, including verse 1 John 5:6 and 1 John 5:8 without verse 7, the heavenly witnesses.

He says, "This is He who came by water and blood"; and again, – For there are three that bear witness, the spirit, which is life, and the water, which is regeneration and faith, and the blood, which is knowledge; "and these three are one. For in the Saviour are those saving virtues, and life itself exists in His own Son."

Another reference that is studied is from Clement's Prophetic Extracts:

Every promise is valid before two or three witnesses, before the Father and the Son and the Holy Spirit; before whom, as witnesses and helpers, what are called the commandments ought to be kept.

This is seen by some as allusion evidence that Clement was familiar with the verse.

=== Tertullian ===
Tertullian, in Against Praxeas (c. 210), supports a Trinitarian view by quoting John 10:30:

So the close series of the Father in the Son and the Son in the Paraclete makes three who cohere, the one attached to the other: And these three are one substance, not one person, (qui tres unum sunt, non unus) in the sense in which it was said, "I and the Father are one" in respect of unity of substance, not of singularity of number.

While many other commentators have argued against any Comma evidence here, most emphatically John Kaye's, "far from containing an allusion to 1 Jo. v. 7, it furnishes most decisive proof that he knew nothing of the verse". Georg Strecker comments cautiously "An initial echo of the Comma Johanneum occurs as early as Tertullian Adv. Pax. 25.1 (CChr 2.1195; written c. 215). In his commentary on John 16:14 he writes that the Father, Son, and Paraclete are one (unum), but not one person (unus). However, this passage cannot be regarded as a certain attestation of the Comma Johanneum."

References from Tertullian in De Pudicitia 21:16 (On Modesty):

The Church, in the peculiar and the most excellent sense, is the Holy Ghost, in which the Three are One, and therefore the whole union of those who agree in this belief (viz. that God the Father, the Son, and the Holy Ghost are one), is named the Church, after its founder and sanctifier (the Holy Ghost).

and De Baptismo:

Now if every word of God is to be established by three witnesses ... For where there are the three, namely the Father, the Son and the Holy Spirit, there is the Church which is a body of the three.

have also been presented as verse allusions.

=== Treatise on Rebaptism ===
The Treatise on Rebaptism, placed as a 3rd-century writing and transmitted with Cyprian's works, has two sections that directly refer to the earthly witnesses, and thus has been used against authenticity by Nathaniel Lardner, Alfred Plummer and others. However, because of the context being water baptism and the precise wording being "et isti tres in unum sunt", the Matthew Henry Commentary uses this as evidence for Cyprian speaking of the heavenly witnesses in Unity of the Church. Arthur Cleveland Coxe and Nathaniel Cornwall also consider the evidence as suggestively positive, as do Westcott and Hort. After approaching the Tertullian and Cyprian references negatively, "morally certain that they would have quoted these words had they known them" Westcott writes about the Rebaptism Treatise:

the evidence of Cent. III is not exclusively negative, for the treatise on Rebaptism contemporary with Cyp. quotes the whole passage simply thus (15: cf. 19), "quia tres testimonium perhibent, spiritus et aqua et sanguis, et isti tres unum sunt".

=== Jerome ===
The Catholic Encyclopedia of 1910 asserts that Jerome "does not seem to know the text", but Charles Forster suggests that the "silent publication of it in the Vulgate ... gives the clearest proof that down to his time the genuineness of this text had never been disputed or questioned."

Many Vulgate manuscripts, including the Codex Fuldensis, the earliest extant Vulgate manuscript, include a Prologue to the Canonical Epistles referring to the Comma:

If the letters were also rendered faithfully by translators into Latin just as their authors composed them, they would not cause the reader confusion, nor would the differences between their wording give rise to contradictions, nor would the various phrases contradict each other, especially in that place where we read the clause about the unity of the Trinity in the first letter of John. Indeed, it has come to our notice that in this letter some unfaithful translators have gone far astray from the truth of the faith, for in their edition they provide just the words for three [witnesses]—namely water, blood and spirit—and omit the testimony of the Father, the Word and the Spirit, by which the Catholic faith is especially strengthened, and proof is tendered of the single substance of divinity possessed by Father, Son and Holy Spirit.77

The Prologue presents itself as a letter of Jerome to Eustochium, to whom Jerome dedicated his commentary on the prophets Isaiah and Ezekiel. Despite the first-person salutation, some claim it is the work of an unknown imitator from the late 5th century. (The Codex Fuldensis Prologue references the Comma, but the Codex's version of 1 John omits it, which has led many to believe that the Prologue's reference is spurious.) Its inauthenticity is arguably stressed by the omission of the passage from the manuscript's own text of 1 John; however, this can also be seen as confirming the claim in the Prologue that scribes tended to drop the text.

==== Marcus Celedensis ====
Coming down with the writings of Jerome is the extant statement of faith attributed to Marcus Celedensis, friend and correspondent to Jerome, presented to Cyril:

To us there is one Father, and his only Son [who is] very [or true] God, and one Holy Spirit, [who is] very God, and these three are one; – one divinity, and power, and kingdom. And they are three persons, not two nor one.

==== Phoebadius of Agen ====
Similarly, Jerome wrote of Phoebadius of Agen in his Lives of Illustrious Men. "Phoebadius, bishop of Agen, in Gaul, published a book Against the Arians. There are said to be other works by him, which I have not yet read. He is still living, infirm with age." William Hales looks at Phoebadius:

Phoebadius, A. D. 359, in his controversy with the Arians, Cap, xiv. writes, "The Lord says, I will ask of my Father, and He will give you another advocate." (John xiv. 16) Thus, the Spirit is another from the Son as the Son is another from the Father; so, the third person is in the Spirit, as the second, is in the Son. All, however, are one God, because the three are one, (tres unum sunt.) ... Here, 1 John v. 7, is evidently connected, as a scriptural argument, with John xiv. 16.

Griesbach argued that Phoebadius was only making an allusion to Tertullian, and his unusual explanation was commented on by Reithmayer.

=== Augustine ===
Augustine of Hippo has been said to be completely silent on the matter, which has been taken as evidence that the Comma did not exist as part of the epistle's text in his time. This argumentum ex silentio has been contested by other scholars, including Fickermann and Metzger. In addition, some Augustine references have been seen as verse allusions.

The City of God section, from Book V, Chapter 11:

Therefore God supreme and true, with His Word and Holy Spirit (which three are one), one God omnipotent ...

has often been referenced as based upon the scripture verse of the heavenly witnesses. George Strecker acknowledges the City of God reference: "Except for a brief remark in De civitate Dei (5.11; CChr 47.141), where he says of Father, Word, and Spirit that the three are one. Augustine († 430) does not cite the Comma Johanneum. But it is certain on the basis of the work Contra Maximum 2.22.3 (PL 42.794–95) that he interpreted 1 John 5:7–8 in trinitarian terms." Similarly, Homily 10 on the first Epistle of John has been asserted as an allusion to the verse:

And what meaneth "Christ is the end"? Because Christ is God, and "the end of the commandment is charity" and "Charity is God": because Father and Son and Holy Ghost are One.

Another allusion is claimed from De Trinitate:

As, therefore, the Father begot, the Son is begotten; so the Father sent, the Son was sent. But in like manner as He who begot and He who was begotten, so both He who sent and He who was sent, are one, since the Father and the Son are one. So also the Holy Spirit is one with them, since these three are one.

— De Trinitate 4. 20. 29

Another reference from Contra Faustum:

In the passage where we read of the Jews saying to Christ, You bear witness of yourself, your witness is not true, you do not see that Christ replies by saying that Moses wrote of Him, simply because you have not got the eye of piety to see with. The answer of Christ is this: "It is written in your law, that the testimony of two men is true; I am one who bear witness of myself, and the Father that sent me bears witness of me." What does this mean, if rightly understood, but that this number of witnesses required by the law was fixed upon and consecrated in the spirit of prophecy, that even thus might be prefigured the future revelation of the Father and Son, whose spirit is the Holy Spirit of the inseparable Trinity? So it is written: "In the mouth of two or three witnesses shall every word be established."

— Contra Faustum, XVI. 13

And from Tractate 36 on John's Gospel:

If, then, a people, consisting of a great multitude of men, was found a false witness, how is it to be understood that in the mouth of two or three witnesses every word shall stand, unless it be that in this manner the Trinity is mysteriously set forth to us, in which is perpetual stability of truth? Do you wish to have a good cause? Have two or three witnesses, — the Father, Son, and Holy Ghost.

— Tractate 36

Have been presented as allusions.

Contra Maximinum has received attention especially for these two sections, especially the allegorical interpretation.

I would not have thee mistake that place in the epistle of John the apostle where he saith, "There are three witnesses: the spirit, and the water, and the blood: and the three are one." Lest haply thou say that the spirit and the water and the blood are diverse substances, and yet it is said, "the three are one": for this cause I have admonished thee, that thou mistake not the matter. For these are mystical expressions, in which the point always to be considered is, not what the actual things are, but what they denote as signs: since they are signs of things, and what they are in their essence is one thing, what they are in their signification another. If then we understand the things signified, we do find these things to be of one substance ... But if we will inquire into the things signified by these, there not unreasonably comes into our thoughts the Trinity itself, which is the One, Only, True, Supreme God, Father and Son and Holy Ghost, of whom it could most truly be said, "There are Three Witnesses, and the Three are One": there has been an ongoing dialog about context and sense.

— Contra Maximinum (2.22.3; PL 42.794-95)

John Scott Porter writes:

Augustine, in his book against Maximin the Arian, turns every stone to find arguments from the Scriptures to prove that the Spirit is God, and that the Three Persons are the same in substance, but does not adduce this text; nay, clearly shows that he knew nothing of it, for he repeatedly employs the 8th verse, and says, that by the Spirit, the Blood, and the Water—the persons of the Father, Son, and Holy Spirit, are signified (see Contr. Maxim, cap. xxii.).

Thomas Joseph Lamy refutes this claim based on the context and Augustine's purpose, which was defending his claim that whenever scripture says of different things that they are one, it means so of stuff that are of the same substance. Similarly Thomas Burgess, arguing also that Augustine was not proving the trinity from the passage but prohibiting a heterodox use of it. And Norbert Fickermann's reference and scholarship supports the idea that Augustine may have deliberately bypassed a direct quote of the heavenly witnesses. Meanwhile, at the same time, two other passages of Contra Maximinum have been given as allusions to the verse:

For there are three Persons: the Father, and the Son, and the Holy Ghost; and these three (because they are of one substance) are one, and are most supremely one, where there is no diversity of natures, no diversity of wills.

— Contra Maximinum (2.10.2)

Thus, if three things, by which they are signified, came forth from the body of the Lord: just as it resounded from the body of the Lord, that the nations should be baptized in the name of the Father and of the Son and of the Holy Ghost. In the name; not: In the names; for these three are one, and these three are one God.

— Contra Maximinum (2.22.3; PL 42.794-95)

=== Leo the Great ===
In the Tome of Leo, written to Archbishop Flavian of Constantinople, read at the Council of Chalcedon on 10 October 451 AD, and published in Greek, Leo the Great's usage of 1 John 5 has him moving in discourse from verse 6 to verse 8:

This is the victory which overcometh the world, even our faith"; and: "Who is he that overcometh the world, but he that believeth that Jesus is the Son of God? This is he that came by water and blood, even Jesus Christ; not by water only, but by water and blood; and it is the Spirit that beareth witness, because the Spirit is truth. For there are three that bear witness, the spirit, the water, and the blood; and the three are one." That is, the Spirit of sanctification, and the blood of redemption, and the water of baptism; which three things are one, and remain undivided ...

This epistle from Leo was considered by Richard Porson to be the "strongest proof" of verse inauthenticity. In response, Thomas Burgess points out that the context of Leo's argument would not call for the 7th verse. And that the verse was referenced in a fully formed manner centuries earlier than Porson's claim, at the time of Fulgentius and the Council of Carthage. Burgess pointed out that there were multiple confirmations that the verse was in the Latin Bibles of Leo's day. Burgess argued, ironically, that the fact that Leo could move from verse 6 to 8 for argument context is, in the bigger picture, favourable to authenticity. "Leo's omission of the Verse is not only counterbalanced by its actual existence in contemporary copies, but the passage of his Letter is, in some material respects, favourable to the authenticity of the Verse, by its contradiction to some assertions confidently urged against the Verse by its opponents, and essential to their theory against it." Today, with the discovery of additional Old Latin evidences in the 19th century, the discourse of Leo is rarely referenced as a significant evidence against verse authenticity.

=== Cyprian of Carthage - Unity of the Church ===
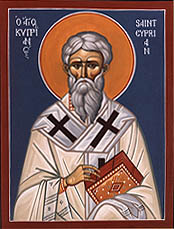
Cyprian of Carthage

The 3rd-century Church father Cyprian (c. 200–58), in writing on the Unity of the Church 1.6, quoted John 10:30 and another scriptural spot:

The Lord says, "I and the Father are one"
and again it is written of the Father, and of the Son, and of the Holy Spirit,
"And these three are one."

The Catholic Encyclopedia concludes "Cyprian ... seems undoubtedly to have had it in mind". Against this view, Daniel B. Wallace writes that since Cyprian does not quote 'the Father, the Word, and the Holy Spirit', "this in the least does not afford proof that he knew of such wording". The fact that Cyprian did not quote the "exact wording... indicates that a Trinitarian interpretation was superimposed on the text by Cyprian". The Critical Text apparatuses have taken varying positions on the Cyprian reference.

The Cyprian citation, dating to more than a century before any extant Epistle of John manuscripts and before the Arian controversies that are often considered pivotal in verse addition/omission debate, remains a central focus of comma research and textual apologetics. The Scrivener view is often discussed. Westcott and Hort assert: "Tert and Cyp use language which renders it morally certain that they would have quoted these words had they known them; Cyp going so far as to assume a reference to the Trinity in the conclusion of v. 8"

In the 20th century, Lutheran scholar Francis Pieper wrote in Christian Dogmatics emphasizing the antiquity and significance of the reference. Frequently commentators have seen Cyprian as having the verse in his Latin Bible, even if not directly supporting and commenting on verse authenticity. Some writers have also seen the denial of the verse in the Bible of Cyprian as worthy of special note and humor.

Daniel B. Wallace notes that although Cyprian uses 1 John to argue for the Trinity, he appeals to this as an allusion via the three witnesses—"written of"—rather than by quoting a proof-text—"written that". Therefore, despite the view of some that Cyprian referred to the passage, the fact that other theologians such as Athanasius of Alexandria and Sabellius and Origen never quoted or referred to that passage is one reason why even many Trinitarians later on also considered the text spurious, and not to have been part of the original text.

==== Ad Jubaianum (Epistle 73) ====
The second, lesser reference from Cyprian that has been involved in the verse debate is from Ad Jubaianum 23.12. Cyprian, while discussing baptism, writes:

If he obtained the remission of sins, he was sanctified, and if he was sanctified, he was made the temple of God. But of what God? I ask. The Creator?, Impossible; he did not believe in him. Christ? But he could not be made Christ's temple, for he denied the deity of Christ. The Holy Spirit? Since the Three are One, what pleasure could the Holy Spirit take in the enemy of the Father and the Son?

Knittel emphasizes that Cyprian would be familiar with the Bible in Greek as well as Latin. "Cyprian understood Greek. He read Homer, Plato, Hermes Trismegistus and Hippocrates ... he translated into Latin the Greek epistle written to him by Firmilianus". UBS-4 has its entry for text inclusion as (Cyprian).

=== Ps-Cyprian - Hundredfold Reward for Martyrs and Ascetics ===
The Hundredfold Reward for Martyrs and Ascetics: De centesima, sexagesimal tricesima speaks of the Father, Son and Holy Spirit as "three witnesses" and was passed down with the Cyprian corpus. This was only first published in 1914 and thus does not show up in the historical debate. UBS-4 includes this in the apparatus as (Ps-Cyprian).

=== Origen and Athanasius ===
Those who see Cyprian as negative evidence assert that other church writers, such as Athanasius of Alexandria and Origen, never quoted or referred to the passage, which they would have done if the verse was in the Bibles of that era. The contrasting position is that there are in fact such references, and that "evidences from silence" arguments, looking at the extant early church writer material, should not be given much weight as reflecting absence in the manuscripts—with the exception of verse-by-verse homilies, which were uncommon in the Ante-Nicene era.

==== Origen's scholium on Psalm 123:2 ====
In the scholium on Psalm 123 attributed to Origen is the commentary:

spirit and body are servants to masters,
Father and Son, and the soul is handmaid to a mistress, the Holy Ghost;
and the Lord our God is the three (persons),
for the three are one.

This has been considered by many commentators, including the translation source Nathaniel Ellsworth Cornwall, as an allusion to verse 7. Ellsworth especially noted the Richard Porson comment in response to the evidence of the Psalm commentary: "The critical chemistry which could extract the doctrine of the Trinity from this place must have been exquisitely refining". Fabricius wrote about the Origen wording "ad locum 1 Joh v. 7 alludi ab origene non est dubitandum".

==== Athanasius and Arius at the Council of Nicea ====
Traditionally, Athanasius was considered to lend support to the authenticity of the verse, one reason being the Disputation with Arius at the Council of Nicea which circulated with the works of Athanasius, where is found:

Likewise is not the remission of sins procured by that quickening and sanctifying ablution, without which no man shall see the kingdom of heaven, an ablution given to the faithful in the thrice-blessed name. And besides all these, John says, And the three are one.

Today, many scholars consider this later work Pseudo-Athanasian, perhaps actually by Maximus the Confessor. Charles Forster in New Plea argues for the writing as stylistically Athanasius. While the author and date are debated, this is a Greek reference directly related to the doctrinal Trinitarian-Arian controversies, and one that purports to be an account of Nicaea when those doctrinal battles were raging. The reference was given in UBS-3 as supporting verse inclusion, yet was removed from UBS-4 for reasons unknown.

==== Synopsis of Scripture ====
The Synopsis of Scripture, often ascribed to Athanasius, has also been referenced as indicating awareness of the Comma.

He also shows the unity of the Son with the Father, and that he who denies the Son, neither has the Father.

Richard Porson, and before him Thomas Emlyn dismissed this as a reference to 1 John 2:23, and not to 1 John 5:7. To which Charles Forster comments on.

=== Priscillian of Avila ===
The earliest quotation which some scholars consider a direct reference to the heavenly witnesses from the First Epistle of John is from the Spaniard Priscillian c. 380. The Latin reads:

Sicut Ioannes ait: tria sunt quae testimonium dicunt in terra aqua caro et sanguis et haec tria in unum sunt, et tria sunt quae testimonium dicent in caelo pater verbum et spiritus et haec tria unum sunt in Christo Iesu.

The English translation:

As John says and there are three which give testimony on earth the water the flesh the blood and these three are in one and there are three which give testimony in heaven the Father the Word and the Spirit and these three are one in Christ Jesus.

Theodor Zahn calls this "the earliest quotation of the passage which is certain and which can be definitely dated (circa 380)", a view expressed by Westcott, Brooke, Metzger and others.

Priscillian was probably a Sabellianist or Modalist Monarchian. Some interpreters have theorized that Priscillian created the Comma Johanneum. However, there are signs of the Comma Johanneum, although no certain attestations, even before Priscillian". And Priscillian in the same section references The Unity of the Church section from Cyprian. In the early 1900s the Karl Künstle theory of Priscillian origination and interpolation was popular: "The verse is an interpolation, first quoted and perhaps introduced by Priscillian (a.d. 380) as a pious fraud to convince doubters of the doctrine of the Trinity."

==== Expositio Fidei ====
Another complementary early reference is an exposition of faith published in 1883 by Carl Paul Caspari from the Ambrosian manuscript, which also contains the Muratorian (canon) fragment.

pater est Ingenitus, filius uero sine Initio genitus a patre est, spiritus autem sanctus processit a patre et accipit de filio, Sicut euangelista testatur quia scriptum est, "Tres sunt qui dicunt testimonium in caelo pater uerbum et spiritus:" et haec tria unum sunt in Christo lesu. Non tamen dixit "Unus est in Christo lesu."

Edgar Simmons Buchanan, points out that the reading "in Christo Iesu" is textually valuable, referencing 1 John 5:7.

The authorship is uncertain, however it is often placed around the same period as Priscillian. Karl Künstle saw the writing as anti-Priscillianist, which would have competing doctrinal positions utilizing the verse. Alan England Brooke notes the similarities of the Expositio with the Priscillian form, and the Priscillian form with the Leon Palimpsest. Theodor Zahn refers to the Expositio as "possibly contemporaneous" to Priscillian, "apparently taken from the proselyte Isaac (alias Ambrosiaster)".

John Chapman looked closely at these materials and the section in Liber Apologeticus around the Priscillian faith statement "Pater Deus, Filius, Deus, et Spiritus sanctus Deus; haec unum sunt in Christo Iesu". Chapman saw an indication that Priscillian found himself bound to defend the comma by citing from the "Unity of the Church" Cyprian section.

=== Council of Carthage, 484 ===
"The Comma ... was invoked at Carthage in 484 when the Catholic bishops of North Africa confessed their faith before Huneric the Vandal (Victor de Vita, Historia persecutionis Africanae Prov 2.82 [3.11]; CSEL, 7, 60)." The Confession of Faith representing the hundreds of Orthodox bishops included the following section, emphasizing the heavenly witnesses to teach luce clarius ("clearer than the light"):

And so, no occasion for uncertainty is left. It is clear that the Holy Spirit is also God and the author of his own will, he who is most clearly shown to be at work in all things and to bestow the gifts of the divine dispensation according to the judgment of his own will, because where it is proclaimed that he distributes graces where he wills, servile condition cannot exist, for servitude is to be understood in what is created, but power and freedom in the Trinity. And so that we may teach the Holy Spirit to be of one divinity with the Father and the Son still more clearly than the light, here is proof from the testimony of John the evangelist. For he says: "There are three who bear witness in heaven, the Father, the Word and the Holy Spirit, and these three are one." Surely he does not say "three separated by a difference in quality" or "divided by grades which differentiate, so that there is a great distance between them"? No, he says that the "three are one". But so that the single divinity which the Holy Spirit has with the Father and the Son might be demonstrated still more in the creation of all things, you have in the book of Job the Holy Spirit as a creator: "It is the divine Spirit" ..

==== De Trinitate, Contra Varimadum and Isidorus Mercator ====
There are additional heavenly witnesses references that are considered to be from the same period as the Council of Carthage, including references that have been attributed to Vigilius Tapsensis who attended the Council. Raymond Brown gives one summary:

... in the century following Priscillian, the chief appearance of the Comma is in tractates defending the Trinity. In PL 62 227–334 there is a work De Trinitate consisting of twelve books ... In Books 1 and 10 (PL 62, 243D, 246B, 297B) the Comma is cited three times. Another work on the Trinity consisting of three books Contra Varimadum ... North African origin ca. 450 seems probable. The Comma is cited in 1.5 (CC 90, 20–21).

One of the references in De Trinitate, from Book V:

But the Holy Ghost abides in the Father, and in the Son [Filio] and in himself; as the Evangelist St. John so absolutely testifies in his Epistle: And the three are one. But how, ye heretics, are the three ONE, if their substance be divided or cut asunder? Or how are they one, if they be placed one before another? Or how are the three one, if the Divinity be different in each? How are they one, if there reside not in them the united eternal plenitude of the Godhead? These references are in the UBS apparatus as Ps-Vigilius.

The Contra Varimadum and Isidorus Mercator reference:

John the Evangelist, in his Epistle to the Parthians (i.e. his 1st Epistle), says there are three who afford testimony on earth, the Water, the Blood, and the Flesh, and these three are in us; and there are three who afford testimony in heaven, the Father, the Word, and the Spirit, and these three are one.

This is in the UBS apparatus as Varimadum.

Ebrard, in referencing this quote, comments, "We see that he had before him the passage in his New Testament in its corrupt form (aqua, sanguis et caro, et tres in nobis sunt); but also, that the gloss was already in the text, and not merely in a single copy, but that it was so widely diffused and acknowledged in the West as to be appealed to by him bona fide in his contest with his Arian opponents."

The quotation of the verse in the letters attributed to Pope Hyginus and Pope John II was used by several Catholic scholars as a prooftext for the authenticity of the Verse. After the letters were exposed as a forgery, Catholic scholars abandoned the use of them in debates over the verse's authenticity.

=== Fulgentius of Ruspe ===
In the 6th century, Fulgentius of Ruspe, like Cyprian a father of the North African Church, skilled in Greek as well as his native Latin, used the verse in the doctrinal battles of the day, giving an Orthodox explanation of the verse against Arianism and Sabellianism.

==== Contra Arianos ====
From Responsio contra Arianos ("Reply against the Arians"; Migne (Ad 10; CC 91A, 797)):

In the Father, therefore, and the Son, and the Holy Spirit, we acknowledge unity of substance, but dare not confound the persons. For St. John the apostle, testifieth saying, "There are three that bear witness in heaven, the Father, the Word, and the Spirit, and these three are one."

Then Fulgentius discusses the earlier reference by Cyprian, and the interweaving of the two Johannine verses, John 10:30 and 1 John 5:7.

Which also the blessed martyr Cyprian, in his epistle de unitate Ecclesiae (Unity of the Church), confesseth, saying, Who so breaketh the peace of Christ, and concord, acteth against Christ: whoso gathereth elsewhere beside the Church, scattereth. And that he might shew, that the Church of the one God is one, he inserted these testimonies, immediately from the scriptures; The Lord said, "I and the Father are one." And again, of the Father, Son, and Holy Spirit, it is written, "and these three are one".

==== Contra Fabianum ====
Another heavenly witnesses reference from Fulgentius is in Contra Fabianum Fragmenta (Migne (Frag. 21.4: CC 01A,797)):

The blessed Apostle, St. John evidently says, And the three are one; which was said of the Father, the Son, and the Holy Spirit, as I have before shewn, when you demanded of me for a reason

==== De Trinitate ad Felicem ====
Also from Fulgentius in De Trinitate ad Felicem:

See, in short you have it that the Father is one, the Son another, and the Holy Spirit another, in Person, each is other, but in nature they are not other. In this regard He says: "The Father and I, we are one." He teaches us that one refers to Their nature, and we are to Their persons. In like manner it is said: "There are three who bear witness in heaven, the Father, the Word, and the Spirit; and these three are one."

Today these references are generally accepted as probative to the verse being in the Bible of Fulgentius.

==== Adversus Pintam episcopum Arianum ====
A reference in De Fide Catholica adversus Pintam episcopum Arianum that is a Testimonia de Trinitate:

in epistola Johannis, tres sunt in coelo, qui testimonium reddunt,
Pater, Verbum, et Spiritus: et hi tres unum sunt

has been assigned away from Fulgentius to a "Catholic controvertist of the same age".

=== Cassiodorus ===
Cassiodorus wrote Bible commentaries, and was familiar with Old Latin and Vulgate manuscripts, seeking out sacred manuscripts. Cassiodorus was also skilled in Greek. In Complexiones in Epistolis Apostolorum, first published in 1721 by Scipio Maffei, in the commentary section on 1 John, from the Cassiodorus corpus, is written:

On earth three mysteries bear witness,
the water, the blood, and the spirit,
which were fulfilled, we read, in the passion of the Lord.
In heaven, are the Father, the Son, and the Holy Spirit,
and these three are one God.

Thomas Joseph Lamy describes the Cassiodorus section and references that Tischendorf saw this as Cassiodorus having the text in his Bible. However, earlier "Porson endeavoured to show that Cassiodorus had, in his copy, no more than the 8th verse, to which he added the gloss of Eucherius, with whose writings he was acquainted."

=== Isidore of Seville ===
In the early 7th century, the Testimonia Divinae Scripturae et Patrum is often attributed to Isidore of Seville:

De Distinctions personarum, Patris et Filii et Spiritus Sancti.

In Epistola Joannis. Quoniam tres sunt qui testimonium dant in terra Spiritus, aqua, et sanguis; et tres unum sunt in Christo Jesu; et tres sunt qui testimonium dicunt in coelo, Pater, Verbum, et Spiritus, et tres unum sunt.

Arthur-Marie Le Hir asserts that evidences like Isidore and the Autpert Ambrose Commentary on Revelation show early circulation of the Vulgate with the verse and thus also should be considered in the issues of Jerome's original Vulgate text and the authenticity of the Vulgate Prologue. Cassiodorus has also been indicated as reflecting the Vulgate text, rather than simply the Vetus Latina.

=== Commentary on Revelation ===
Autpert Ambrose refers to the scripture verse in his Revelation commentary:

Although the expression of faithful witness found therein, refers directly to Jesus Christ alone, – yet it equally characterises the Father, the Son, and the Holy Ghost; according to these words of St. John. There are three which bear record in heaven, the Father, the Word, and the Holy Ghost, and these three are one.

Autpert Ambrose, "in the middle of the eighth century, wrote a comment upon the Apocalypse, in which this verse is applied, in explaining the 5th verse of the first chapter of the Revelation".

== Medieval use ==
=== Fourth Lateran Council ===
In the Middle Ages a Trinitarian doctrinal debate arose around the position of Joachim of Fiore (1135–1202) which was different from the more traditional view of Peter Lombard (c. 1100–1160). When the Fourth Council of the Lateran was held in 1215 at Rome, with hundreds of Bishops attending, the understanding of the heavenly witnesses was a primary point in siding with Lombard, against the writing of Joachim.

For, he says, Christ's faithful are not one in the sense of a single reality which is common to all. They are one only in this sense, that they form one church through the unity of the catholic faith, and finally one kingdom through a union of indissoluble charity. Thus we read in the canonical letter of John: For there are three that bear witness in heaven, the Father and the Word and the holy Spirit, and these three are one; and he immediately adds, And the three that bear witness on earth are the spirit, water and blood, and the three are one, according to some manuscripts.

The Council thus printed the verse in both Latin and Greek, and this may have contributed to later scholarship references in Greek to the verse. The reference to "some manuscripts" showed an acknowledgment of textual issues, yet this is related to "and the three are one" in verse eight, not the heavenly witnesses in verse seven. The manuscript issue for the final phrase in verse eight and the commentary by Thomas Aquinas were an influence upon the text and note of the Complutensian Polyglot.

=== Latin commentaries ===
In this period, the greater portion of Bible commentary was written in Latin. The references in this era are extensive and wide-ranging. Some of the better-known writers who utilized the comma as scripture, in addition to Peter Lombard and Joachim of Fiore, include Gerbert of Aurillac (Pope Sylvester), Peter Abelard, Bernard of Clairvaux, Duns Scotus, Roger of Wendover (historian, including the Lateran Council), Thomas Aquinas (many verse uses, including one which has Origen relating to "the three that give witness in heaven"), William of Ockham (of razor fame), Nicholas of Lyra and the commentary of the Glossa Ordinaria.

=== Greek commentaries ===
Emanual Calecas (a greek catholic) references the comma in the 14th century and Joseph Bryennius (c. 1350–1430) in the 15th century, both in greek.

The Orthodox accepted the comma as Johannine scripture notwithstanding its absence in the Greek manuscripts line. The Orthodox Confession of Faith, published in Greek in 1643 by the multilingual scholar Peter Mogila specifically references the comma. "Accordingly the Evangelist teacheth (1 John v. 7.) There are three that bear Record in Heaven, the Father, the Word, and the Holy Ghost and these three are one ..."

=== Armenia – Synod of Sis ===
The Epistle of Gregory, the Bishop of Sis, to Haitho c. 1270 utilized 1 John 5:7 in the context of the use of water in the mass. The Synod of Sis of 1307 expressly cited the verse, and deepened the relationship with Rome.

Commentators generally see the Armenian text from the 13th century on as having been modified by the interaction with the Latin church and Bible, including the addition of the comma in some manuscripts.

=== Manuscripts and special notations ===
There are a number of special manuscript notations and entries relating to 1 John 5:7. Vulgate scholar Samuel Berger reports on Corbie MS 13174 in the Bibliothèque nationale in Paris that shows the scribe listing four distinct textual variations of the heavenly witnesses. Three are understood by the scribe to have textual lineages of Athanasius, Augustine (two) and Fulgentius. And there is in addition a margin text of the heavenly witnesses that matches the Theodulphian recension. The Franciscan Correctorium gives a note about there being manuscripts with the verses transposed. The Regensburg ms. referenced by Fickermann discusses the positions of Jerome and Augustine. Contarini, The Glossa Ordinaria discusses the Vulgate Prologue in the Preface, in addition to its commentary section on the verse. John J. Contrini in Haimo of Auxerre, Abbot of Sasceium (Cessy-les-Bois), and a New Sermon on I John v. 4–10 discusses a 9th-century manuscript and the Leiden sermon.

== Inclusion by Erasmus ==
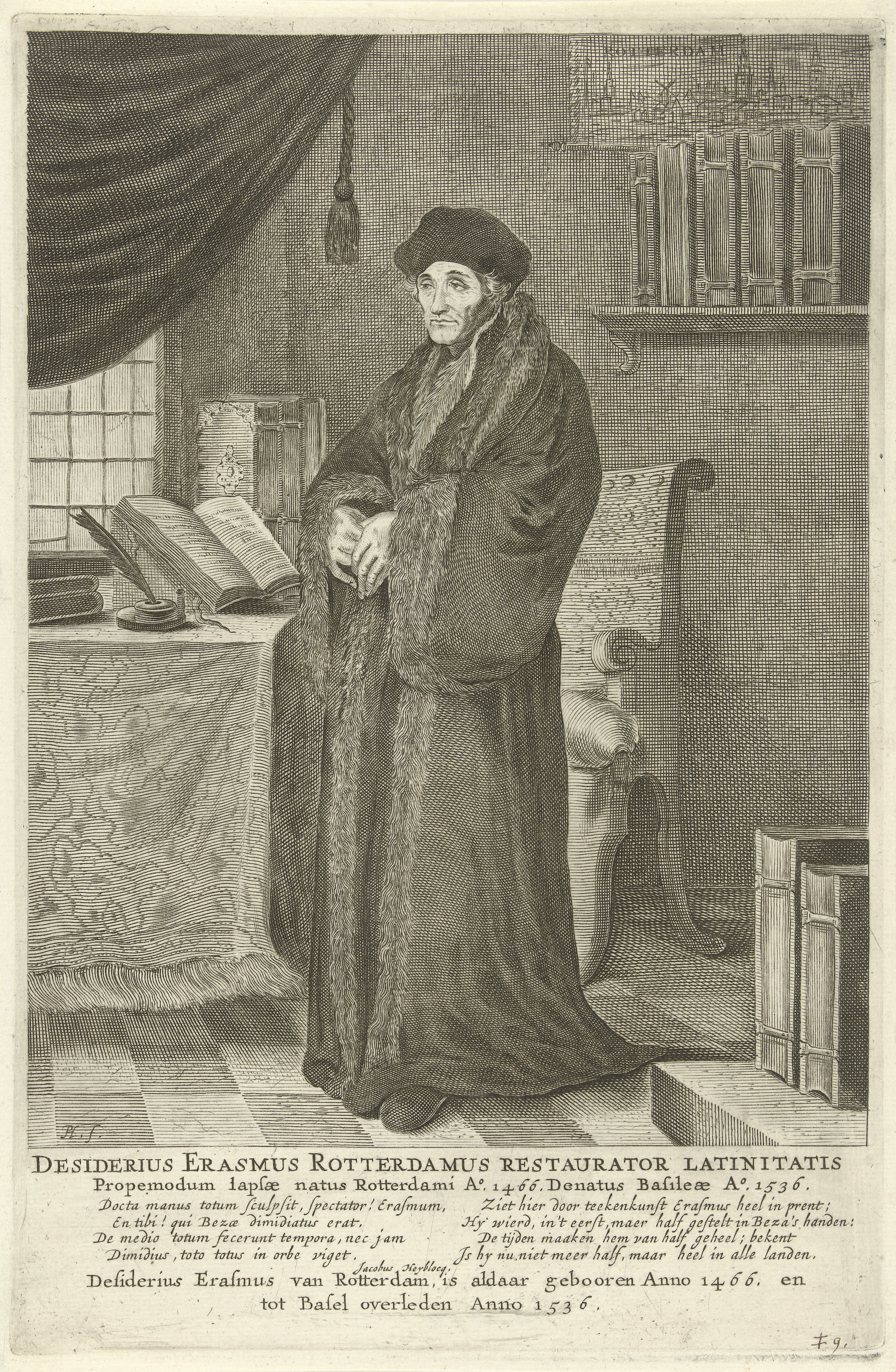
The Johannine Comma (1 John 5:7) was added into Erasmus's third edition of the Textus Receptus.

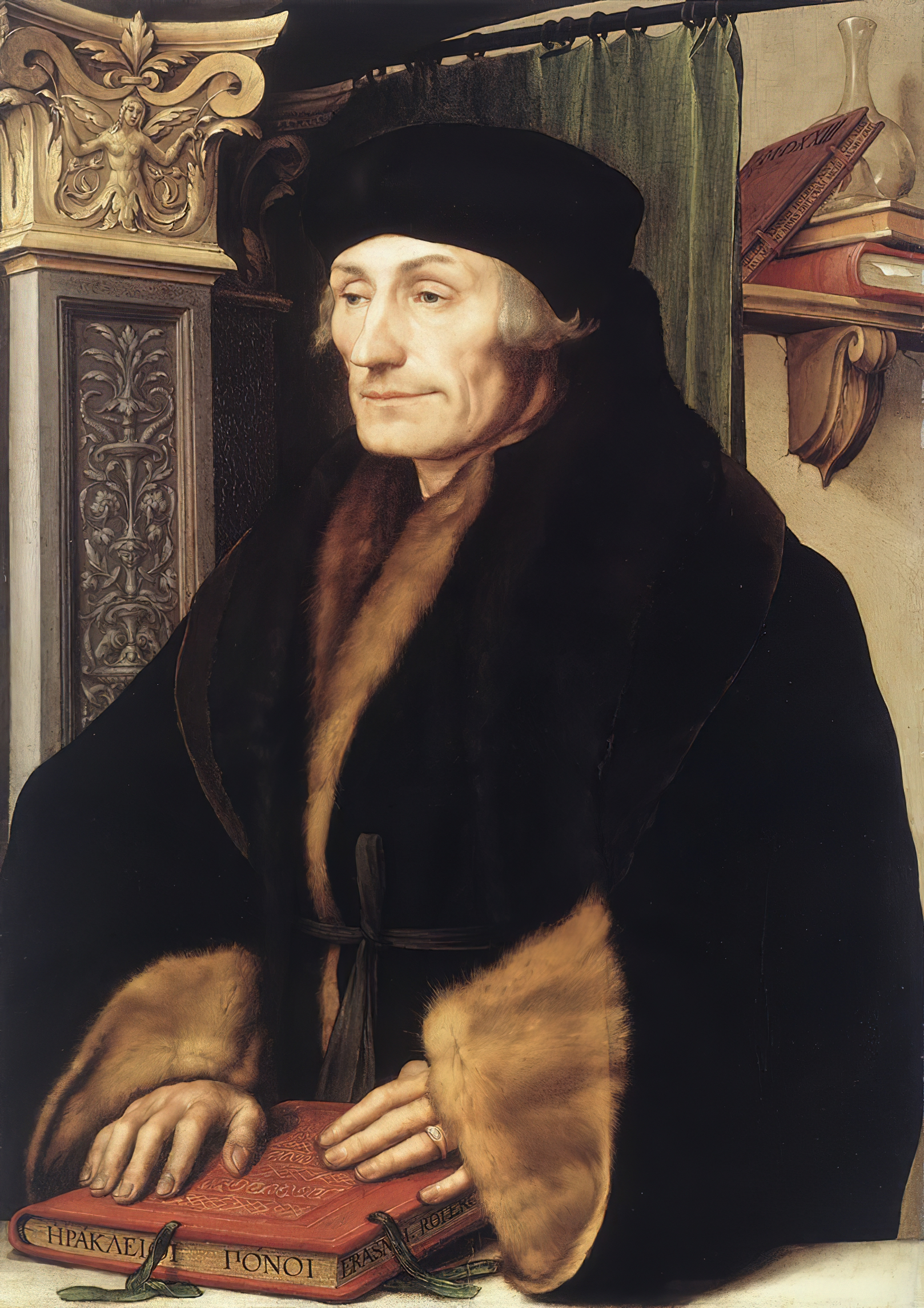
Desiderius Erasmus in 1523.

The central figure in the 16th-century history of the Johannine Comma is the humanist Erasmus, and his efforts leading to the publication of the Greek New Testament. The comma was not included in the first edition in 1516, the Nouum instrumentum omne: diligenter ab Erasmo Roterodamo recognitum et emendatum, nor the second edition of 1519, as it did not exist in any of the Greek manuscripts he could find. It would be added to later editions, after intense political pressure.

Erasmus first added the comma, with commentary, in his paraphrase edition, first published in 1520. And in Ratio seu methodus compendio perueniendi ad ueram theologiam, first published in 1518, Erasmus included the comma in the interpretation of John 12 and 13. Erasmian scholar John Jack Bateman, discussing the Paraphrase and the Ratio uerae theologiae, says of these uses of the comma that "Erasmus attributes some authority to it despite any doubts he had about its transmission in the Greek text."

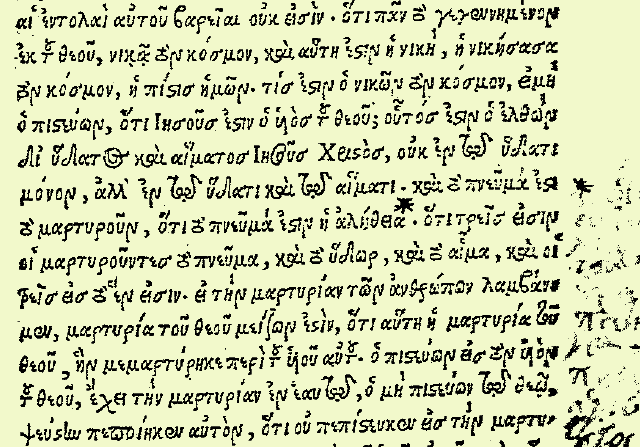
This photograph shows Greek text of 1 John 5:3–10 which is missing the Comma Johanneum. This text was published in 1524.

The New Testament of Erasmus provoked critical responses that focused on a number of verses, including his text and translation decisions on Romans 9:5, John 1:1, 1 Timothy 1:17, Titus 2:13 and Philippians 2:6. The absence of the comma from the first two editions received a sharp response from churchmen and scholars, and was discussed and defended by Erasmus in the correspondence with Edward Lee and Diego López de Zúñiga (Stunica), and Erasmus is also known to have referenced the verse in correspondence with Antoine Brugnard in 1518. The first two Erasmus editions only had a small note about the verse. The major Erasmus writing regarding comma issues was in the Annotationes to the third edition of 1522, expanded in the fourth edition of 1527 and then given a small addition in the fifth edition of 1535.

Erasmus is said to have replied to his critics that the comma did not occur in any of the Greek manuscripts he could find, but that he would add it to future editions if it appeared in a single Greek manuscript. When a single such manuscript (the Codex Montfortianus), was subsequently found to contain it, he added the comma to his 1522 edition, though he expressed doubt as to the authenticity of the passage in his Annotations and added a lengthy footnote setting out his suspicion that the manuscript had been prepared expressly to confute him. This manuscript had probably been produced in 1520 by a Franciscan who translated it from the Vulgate. This change was accepted into editions based on the Textus Receptus, the chief source for the King James Version, thereby fixing the comma firmly in the English-language scriptures for centuries. There is no explicit evidence, however, that such a promise was ever made.

The authenticity of the story of Erasmus is questioned by many scholars. Bruce Metzger removed this story from his book's (The Text of the New Testament) third edition although it was included in the first and second editions in the same book.

Despite being a commonly accepted fact in modern scholarship, some people in the past such as Thomas Burgess (1756 – 19 February 1837) have disputed the identification of Erasmus' "Codex Britannicus" as the same manuscript as the Codex Montfortianus, instead proposing that it is a now lost Greek manuscript.

== Modern reception ==
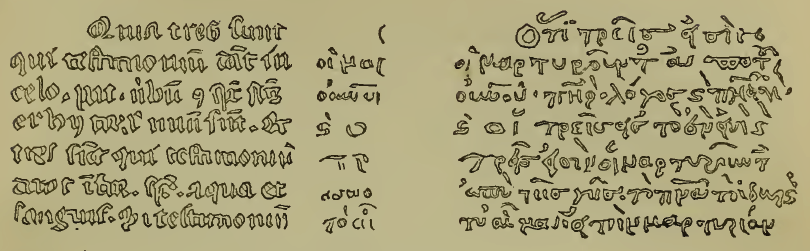
Comma in Codex Ottobonianus (629 Gregory-Aland)

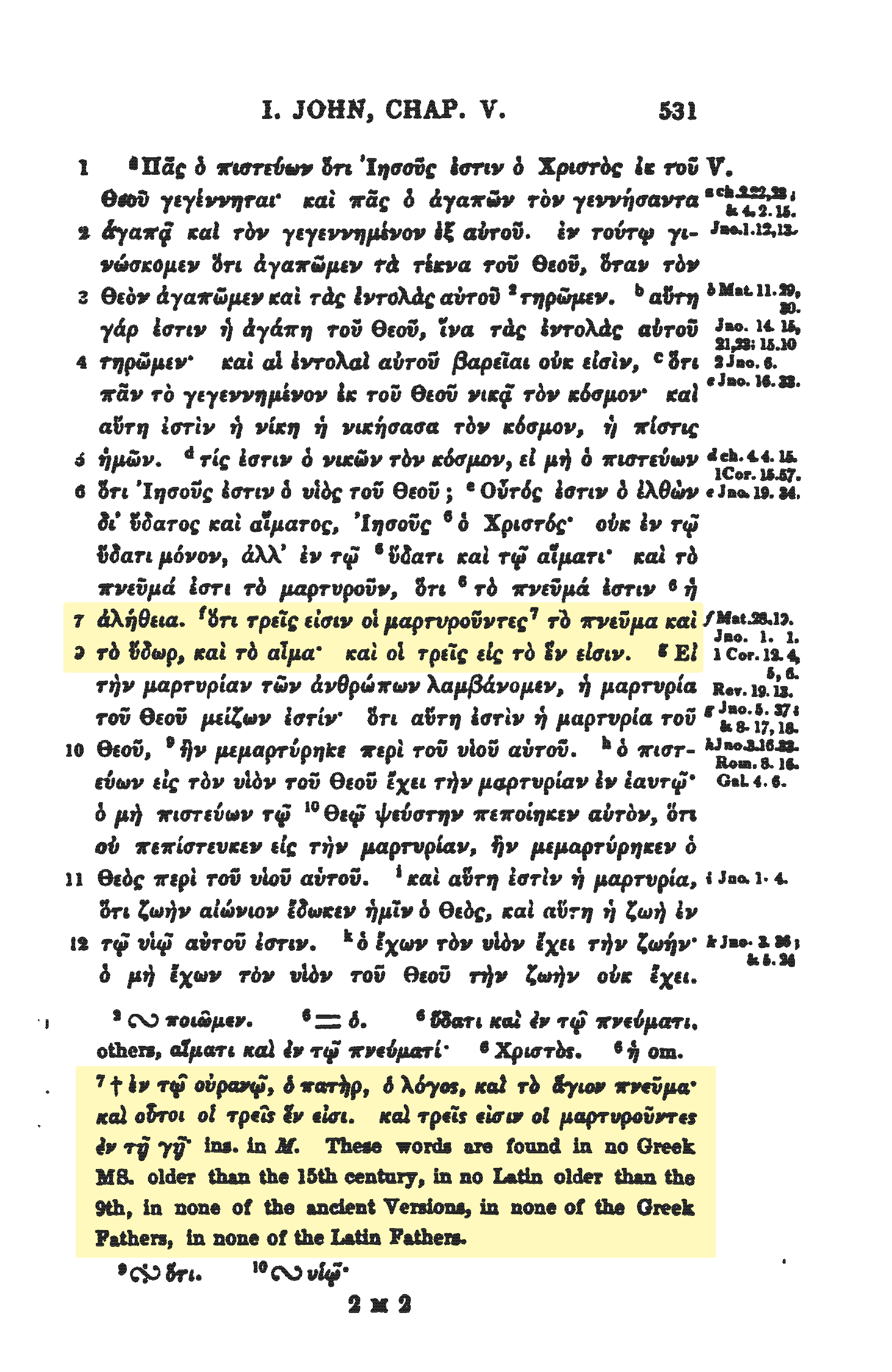
Hē Kainē Diathēkē 1859, with Griesbach's text of the New Testament. The English note is from the 1859 editor, with reasons for omitting the Johannine Comma.

In 1807 Charles Butler described the dispute to that point as consisting of three distinct phases.

=== Erasmus and the Reformation ===
The 1st phase began with the disputes and correspondence involving Erasmus with Edward Lee followed by Jacobus Stunica. And about the 16th-century controversies, Thomas Burgess summarized "In the sixteenth century its chief opponents were Socinus, Blandrata, and the Fratres Poloni; its defenders, Ley, Beza, Bellarmine, and Sixtus Senensis." In the 17th century John Selden in Latin and Francis Cheynell and Henry Hammond were English writers with studies on the verse, Johann Gerhard and Abraham Calovius from the German Lutherans, writing in Latin.

=== Simon, Newton, Mill and Bengel ===
The 2nd dispute stage begins with Christopher Sandius around 1670. Francis Turretin published De Tribus Testibus Coelestibus in 1674 and the verse was a central focus of the writings of Symon Patrick. In 1689 the attack on authenticity by Richard Simon was published in English, in his Critical History of the Text of the New Testament. Many responded directly to the views of Simon, including Thomas Smith, Friedrich Kettner, James Benigne Bossuet, Johann Majus, Thomas Ittigius, Abraham Taylor and the published sermons of Edmund Calamy. There was the verse defences by John Mill and later by Johann Bengel. Also in this era was the David Martin and Thomas Emlyn debate. There were attacks on authenticity by Richard Bentley and Samuel Clarke and William Whiston and defence of authenticity by John Guyse in the Practical Expositor. There were writings by numerous additional scholars, including posthumous publication in London of Isaac Newton's Two Letters in 1754 (An Historical Account of Two Notable Corruptions of Scripture), which he had written to John Locke in 1690. The mariner's compass poem of Bengel was given in a slightly modified form by John Wesley.

=== Travis and Porson debate ===
The third stage of the controversy begins with the quote from Edward Gibbon in 1776:

Even the Scriptures themselves were profaned by their rash and sacrilegious hands. The memorable text, which asserts the unity of the three who bear witness in heaven, is condemned by the universal silence of the orthodox fathers, ancient versions, and authentic manuscripts. It was first alleged by the Catholic bishops whom Hunneric summoned to the conference of Carthage. An allegorical interpretation, in the form, perhaps, of a marginal note, invaded the text of the Latin Bibles, which were renewed and corrected in a dark period of ten centuries.

It is followed by the response of George Travis that led to the Porson–Travis debate. In the 1794 3rd edition of Letters to Edward Gibbon, Travis included a 42-part appendix with source references. Another event coincided with the inauguration of this stage of the debate: "a great stirring in sacred science was certainly going on. Griesbach's first edition of the New Testament (1775–7) marks the commencement of a new era." The Griesbach GNT provided an alternative to the Received Text editions to assist as scholarship textual legitimacy for opponents of the verse.

=== 19th century ===
Some highlights from this era are the Nicholas Wiseman Old Latin and Speculum scholarship, the defence of the verse by the Germans Immanuel Sander, Besser, Georg Karl Mayer and Wilhelm Kölling, the Charles Forster New Plea book which revisited Richard Porson's arguments, and the earlier work by his friend Arthur-Marie Le Hir, Discoveries included the Priscillian reference and Exposito Fidei. Also Old Latin manuscripts including La Cava, and the moving up of the date of the Vulgate Prologue due to its being found in Codex Fuldensis. Ezra Abbot wrote on 1 John V.7 and Luther's German Bible and Scrivener's analysis came forth in Six Lectures and Plain Introduction. In the 1881 Revision came the full removal of the verse. Daniel McCarthy noted the change in position among the textual scholars, and in French there was the sharp Roman Catholic debate in the 1880s involving Pierre Rambouillet, Auguste-François Maunoury, Jean Michel Alfred Vacant, Elie Philippe and Paulin Martin. In Ireland Charles Vincent Dolman wrote about the Revision and the comma in the Dublin Review, noting that "the heavenly witnesses have departed".

=== 20th century ===
The 20th century saw the scholarship of Alan England Brooke and Joseph Pohle, the RCC controversy following the 1897 Papal declaration as to whether the verse could be challenged by Catholic scholars, the Karl Künstle Priscillian-origin theory, the detailed scholarship of Augustus Bludau in many papers, the Eduard Riggenbach book, and the Franz Pieper and Edward F. Hills defences. There were specialty papers by Anton Baumstark (Syriac reference), Norbert Fickermann (Augustine), Claude Jenkins (Bede), Mateo del Alamo, Teófilo Ayuso Marazuela, Franz Posset (Luther) and Rykle Borger (Peshitta). Verse dismissals, such as that given by Bruce Metzger, became popular. There was the fine technical scholarship of Raymond Brown. And the continuing publication and studies of the Erasmus correspondence, writings and Annotations, some with English translation. From Germany came Walter Thiele's Old Latin studies and sympathy for the comma being in the Bible of Cyprian, and the research by Henk de Jonge on Erasmus and the Received Text and the comma.

=== Recent scholarship ===
The first 20 years of the 21st century have seen a popular revival of interest in the historic verse controversies and the textual debate. Factors include the growth of interest in the Received Text and the Authorized Version (including the King James Version Only movement) and the questioning of Critical Text theories, the 1995 book by Michael Maynard documenting the historical debate on 1 John 5:7, and the internet ability to spur research and discussion with participatory interaction. In this period, King James Bible defenders and opponents wrote a number of papers on the Johannine Comma, usually published in evangelical literature and on the internet. In textual criticism scholarship circles, the book by Klaus Wachtel Der byzantinische Text der katholischen Briefe: Eine Untersuchung zur Entstehung der Koine des Neuen Testaments, 1995 contains a section with detailed studies on the Comma. Similarly, Der einzig wahre Bibeltext?, published in 2006 by K. Martin Heide. Special interest has been given to the studies of the Codex Vaticanus umlauts by Philip Barton Payne and Paul Canart, senior paleographer at the Vatican Library. The Erasmus studies have continued, including research on the Valladolid inquiry by Peter G. Bietenholz and Lu Ann Homza. Jan Krans has written on conjectural emendation and other textual topics, looking closely at the Received Text work of Erasmus and Beza. And some elements of the recent scholarship commentary have been especially dismissive and negative.

=== Catholic Church ===
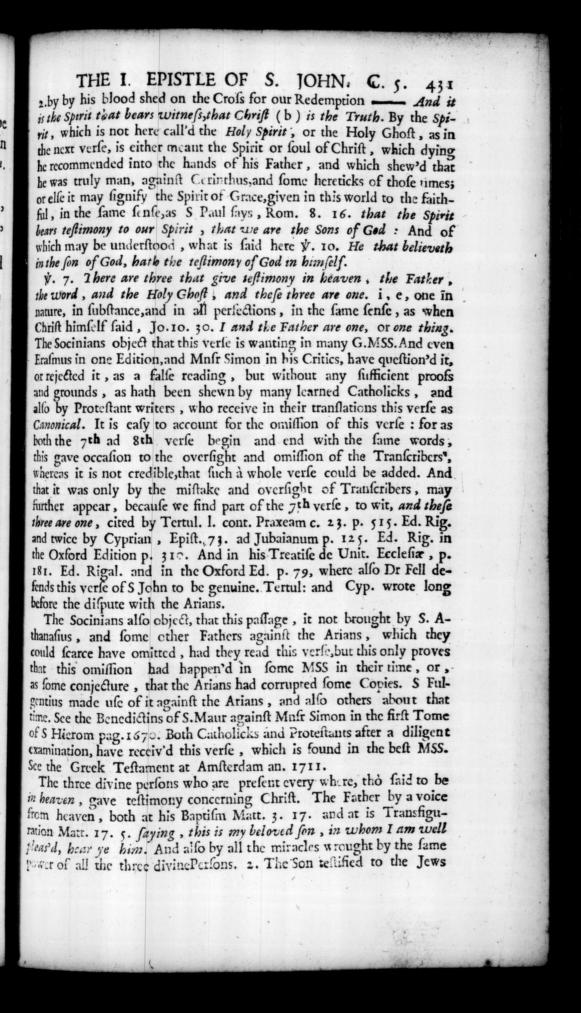
Defense of 1 John 5:7 by Catholic Scholar Robert Witham in his 1730 Commentary on the Rheims New Testament

The Catholic Church at the Council of Trent in 1546 defined the Biblical canon as "the entire books with all their parts, as these have been wont to be read in the Catholic Church and are contained in the old Latin Vulgate". The Comma appeared in both the Sixtine (1590) and the Clementine (1592) editions of the Vulgate. Although the revised Vulgate contained the Comma, the earliest known copies did not, leaving the status of the Comma Johanneum unclear. The Douay Catechism of 1649 uses the comma as a prooftext for the Most Holy Trinity. Catholic Bible Commentaries since the Protestant Revolution until the Second Vatican Council have defended the Authenticity of the Comma. The Original Douay–Rheims Bible defends the verse by accusing the Arians of corrupting it, Cornelius a Lapide does the same quoting along with Robert Witham, Jakub Wujek and Félix Torres Amat patristic witnesses, proving that the Traditional Catholic view was that the verse was original. On 13 January 1897, during a period of reaction in the Church, the Holy Office decreed that Catholic theologians could not "with safety" deny or call into doubt the Comma's authenticity. Pope Leo XIII approved this decision two days later, though his approval was not in forma specifica—that is, Leo XIII did not invest his full papal authority in the matter, leaving the decree with the ordinary authority possessed by the Holy Office.

Three decades later, on 2 June 1927, Pope Pius XI decreed that the Comma Johanneum was open to investigation. It was not included in the 1986 Nova Vulgata.

=== King James Only movement ===
In more recent years, the Comma has become relevant to the King James Only Movement, a Protestant development most prevalent within the fundamentalist and Independent Baptist branch of the Baptist churches. Many proponents view the Comma as an important Trinitarian text. The defense of the verse by Edward Freer Hills in 1956 in his book The King James Version Defended in the section "The Johannine Comma (1 John 5:7)" was unusual due to Hills' textual criticism scholarship credentials.

== Grammatical analysis ==
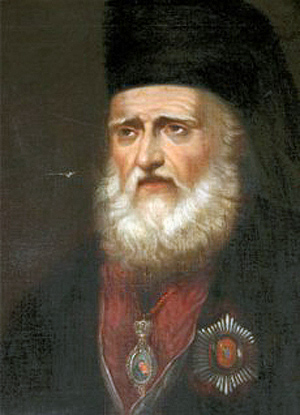
Eugenius Bulgaris (1716–1806)

In 1 John 5:7–8 in the Critical Text and the different editions of the Majority Text, though not the Textus Receptus, we have a shorter text with only the earthly witnesses. And the following words appear:

1 John 5:7-8 ... ὅτι τρεῖς εἰσιν οἱ μαρτυροῦντες τὸ πνεῦμα καὶ τὸ ὕδωρ καὶ τὸ αἷμα καὶ οἱ τρεῖς εἰς τὸ ἕν εἰσιν

1 John 5:7-8 ... For there are three who bear witness, the spirit, and the water, and the blood: and the three agree in one.

Grantley Robert McDonald gives the history of the 1780 letter from Eugenius Bulgaris (1716–1806) along with an explanation of the grammatical gender discordance issue when the text has only the earthly witnesses:

"As further evidence for the genuineness of the comma, Bulgaris noted the lack of grammatical coordination between the masculine τρεῖς μαρτυροῦντες and the three neuter nouns τὸ πνεῦμα, καὶ τὸ ὕδωρ, καὶ τὸ αἷμα. He remarked that although it is possible in Greek to agree masculine or feminine nouns with neuter adjectives or pronouns, the reverse was unusual; one would more normally expect τρία εἰσι τὰ μαρτυροῦντα . . . καὶ τὰ τρία. Bulgaris seems then to be the first to have argued for the genuineness of the comma through the argument from grammar ..." Biblical Criticism in Early Modern England p. 114

The grammatical issue was first noticed by Gregory Naziansus in his disputes with Macedonian Christians, however he did not cite the Johannine Comma itself. In the medieval era, Desiderius Erasmus also noticed the seemingly unusual grammar when his text has only the earthly witnesses, in addition, Thomas Naogeorgus (1511–1578) also wondered about the grammar. Matthaei reported on a scholium from about 1000 AD. Porson's Letters to Travis gives the scholium text as "Three in the masculine gender, in token of the Trinity: the spirit, of the Godhead; the water, of the enlightening knowledge to mankind, by the spirit; the blood, of the incarnation."

Eugenius Bulgaris saw the "heavenly witnesses" as grammatically necessary to explain the masculine grammar, else the earthly witnesses alone would be a solecism. Frederick Nolan, in his 1815 book, An Inquiry into the Integrity of the Greek Vulgate, brought the argument of Eugenius to the English debate. John Oxlee, in debate with Nolan, took the position that the "earthly witnesses" grammar was sound. Robert Dabney took a position similar to Eugenius Bulgaris and Frederick Nolan, as did Edward Hills. However, according to Daniel Wallace the grammar can be explained without a need for the Johannine comma, stating each article-participle phrase (οἱ μαρτυροῦντες) in 1 John 5:7-8 functions as a substantive and agrees with the natural gender (masculine) of the idea being expressed (persons). Thus, according to Wallace, the three earthly witnesses were being personalized by John, allowing for the usage of the masculine gender despite the nouns being neuter.

Some late manuscripts of 1 John 5:7 omit the masculine form of the word "bear witness". These include GA 044, 254, 1523, 1524, 1844 and 1852.

Another argument using the grammar of verse 8 for the authenticity of verse 7 is the article τὸ before ἕν in εἰς τὸ ἕν εἰσιν, which has been argued by Sebastian Schmidt, Christianus Stockius and Johann Christoph Wolf as referring back to the ἕν in verse 7. Thomas Middleton, despite himself being an opponent of the verse admitted that the reading εἰς τὸ ἕν can't "be reconciled with the extermination of ver. 7".

== See also ==
- List of New Testament verses not included in modern English translations
- Textual criticism
- Erasmus
- Richard Simon (priest)
- Isaac Newton
- David Martin (French divine) – the French Bible translator who also defended the authenticity of the Comma Johanneum
- Eugenios Voulgaris – Greek scholar who highlighted the solecism in the short text
- Richard Porson – against authenticity, wrote contra George Travis
- Frederick Nolan (theologian)
- Thomas Burgess (bishop) – wrote books which highlight heavenly witnesses defense
- Edward F. Hills
- Codex Ravianus

=== Other disputed New Testament passages ===
- The Longer Ending of Mark
- Pericope Adulteræ – the woman caught in adultery
- Matthew 16:2b–3 – ye can discern the face of the sky; but can ye not discern the signs of the times?
- John 5:3b–4 – pool of Bethesda, angel troubled the water
- Doxology to the Lord's Prayer
- Luke 22:19b–20
