= Minuscule 918 =

- New Testament manuscript
- Name: Cod. Escurialensis, Σ. I. 5
- Text: Catholic epistles, Pauline epistles
- Date: 16th-century
- Script: Greek
- Now at: Escorial
- Size: 34.5 cm by 23.5 cm
- Type: mixed, Byzantine text-type
- Category: III, V
- Note: marginalia

Minuscule 918 (in the Gregory-Aland numbering), O ^{66} (von Soden), is a 16th-century Greek minuscule manuscript of the New Testament on paper, with a commentary. The manuscript is famous for the Comma Johanneum.

== Description ==
The codex contains the text of the Catholic and Pauline epistles on 397 paper leaves (size 34.5 cm by 23.5 cm). The text is written in one column per page, 28 lines per page. The Catholic epistles contain a commentary.

== Text ==
The Greek text of the codex is a representative of the Byzantine text-type in the Pauline epistles. In the Catholic epistles it has mixed text with some old and valuable readings. Kurt and Barbara Aland gave it the following textual profile in the Catholic epistles: 63^{1}, 7^{1/2}, 15^{2}, 15^{s}. This means the text of the manuscript agrees with the Byzantine standard text 63 times, and 7 times with the Byzantine when it has the same reading as the original text, it agrees 15 times with the original text against the Byzantine, it has 15 independent or distinctive readings (Sonderlesarten). In the Pauline epistles Alands gave the profile – 165^{1}, 44^{1/2}, 1^{2}, 6^{s}. Alands placed the Greek text of the Pauline epistles in Category V and the text of the Catholic epistles in the Category III.

It contains a spurious biblical passage the Comma Johanneum (from the original scribe).

== History ==
F. H. A. Scrivener dated it to the fourteenth century. C. R. Gregory dated the manuscript to the sixteenth century, which is in conformation with the current dating by the INTF. The manuscript was added to the list of New Testament manuscripts by Scrivener (206^{a}) Gregory (234^{a}). Gregory saw it in 1886. It was briefly described by Emmanuel Miller (Miller 8). In 1908 Gregory gave it the number 918. Currently the manuscript is housed at the library of Escorial (Cod. Escurialensis, Σ. I. 5), in Escurial.

== See also ==
- List of New Testament minuscules
- Biblical manuscript
- Textual criticism
- Codex Ravianus
