= Codex Sangallensis 907 =

8th-century Latin manuscript of the New Testament

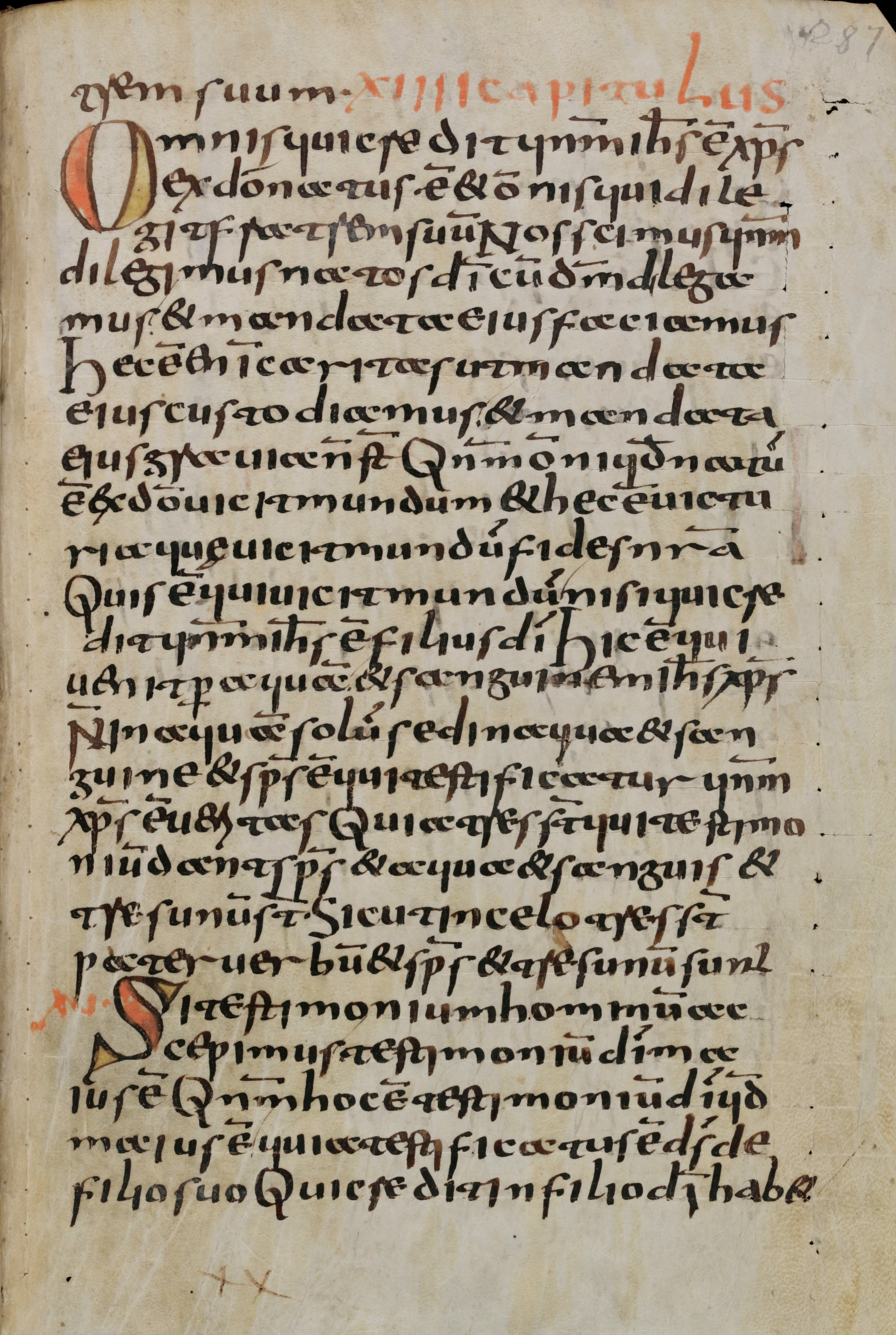
Codex Sangallensis 907

The Codex Sangallensis 907, designated S, is an 8th-century Latin manuscript of the New Testament. The text, written on vellum, is a version of the Latin Vulgate Bible. It contains the text of the Catholic epistles, Book of Revelation, and non-biblical material (an Etymological dictionary, Four ages). The manuscript did not survive in a complete condition and some parts of it have been lost. The codex contains the Comma Johanneum.

== Description ==
Codex Sangallensis 907 contains the Catholic epistles on the pages 237–297, the Apocalypse 1:1-7:2 on the pages 303–318. It contains also Old Testament books - Book of Numbers and Book of Deuteronomy. on 160 parchment leaves (25 by 17.5 cm). On folios 19-20, it has additional material: the Four Ages of the World. According to this material, the Longobards conquered Italy in the year 5772 (from the creation of the world). On folios 21-217 it has Etymological dictionary. The text is written 24 lines in one column per page, in semi-uncial letters. The ink is black, with the initial letters being uncials and in colour. The initial letters are written very carefully and decorated by zoomorphic motives like fish. The nomina sacra are written in an abbreviated way and in Greek letters. The text of the codex is a mixture of the text-types. It contains the text of the Comma Johanneum after 1 John 5:8 (in the same location as in the Codex Cavensis). It reads filio (for son) in 1 John 5:10, where the majority of manuscripts have Deo (for God). In 5:17 it reads iniquitas (wrongdoing) for iniustitia (unrighteousness).

== History ==
The manuscript was written by the monk Winithar and examined and described by Gustav Scherrer and Samuel Berger. The manuscript was collated by Henry Julian White. John Wordsworth designated the manuscript by siglum S_{2}. It was digitised and it is available on the site of the Virtual Manuscript Library of Switzerland. Currently it is housed at the Abbey library of Saint Gall (907) in St. Gallen.

== See also ==
- List of New Testament Latin manuscripts
- Codex Sangallensis 63
