= Codex Sangallensis 63 =

9th-century Latin manuscript of the New Testament

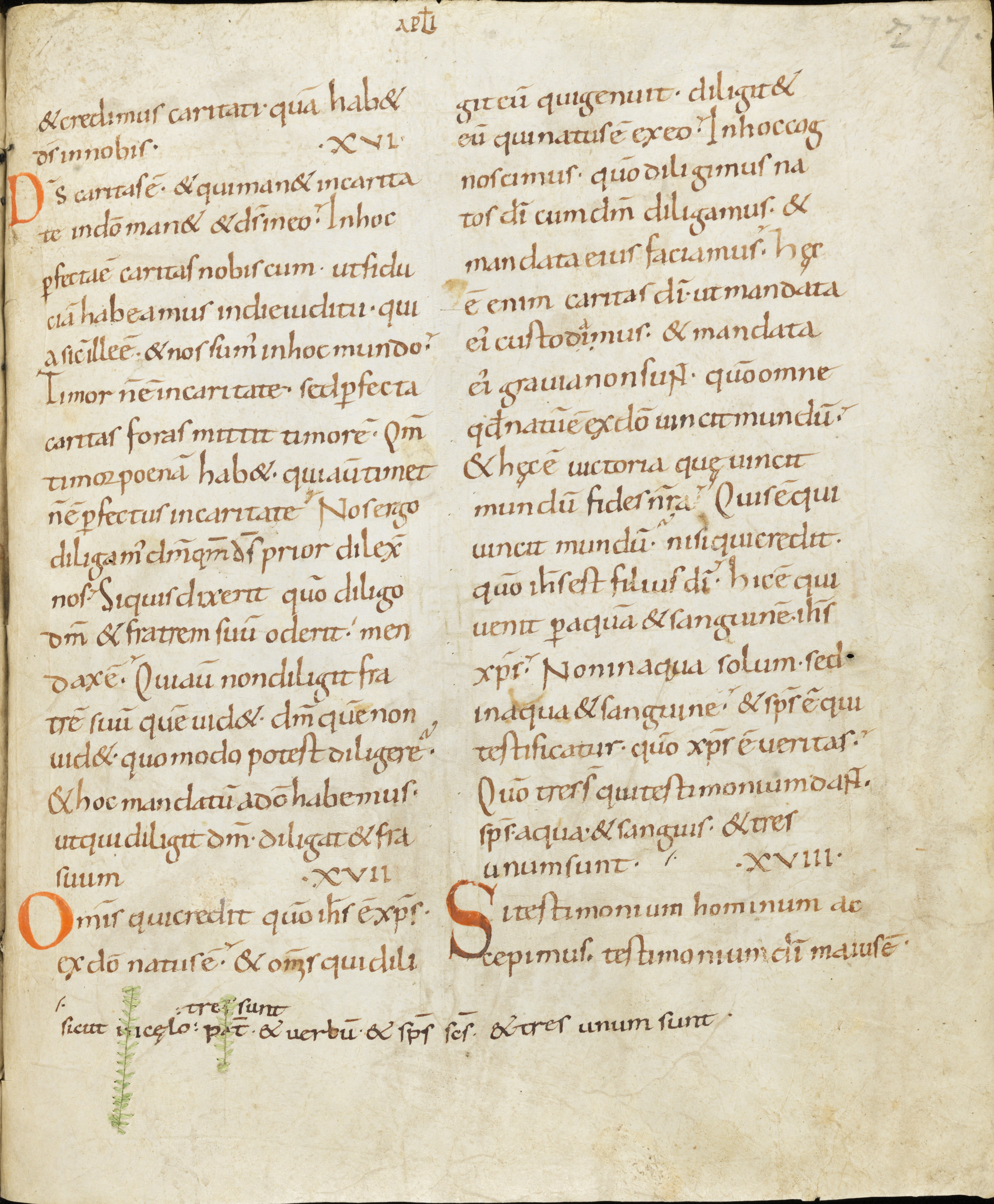
Codex Sangallensis 63 with the Comma Johanneum added later in a different hand and in darker ink at the bottom left:...tre[s] sunt pat[er] & uerbu[m] & sps [=spiritus] scs [=sanctus] & tres unum sunt. Translation: "three are the father and the word and the holy spirit and the three are one."

The Codex Sangallensis 63, designated by S in some critical editions of the Bible, is a 9th-century Latin manuscript of the New Testament. The text, written on vellum, is a version of the Vulgate and contains the text of the Acts of the Apostles, Epistles, Book of Revelation, and non-biblical material (an Etymological dictionary). The manuscript has not survived in a complete condition, some parts of it have been lost. The original manuscript did not contain the Comma Johanneum (in 1 John 5:7), but it was added by a later hand on the bottom margin (see picture).

== Description ==
Codex Sangallensis contains 160 leaves (320 pages) arranged in quarto, in one thick volume. The measures of leaves are 22.3 by 19.2 cm. A single paper fly-leaf was added by a later hand. The text is written in 22 lines in one (pages 1–49) or two (pages 50–320) columns per page in Carolingian minuscule letters with black ink. The head-pieces are written in uncial letters, the initial letters are red. It has some margin notes. The order of books: Pauline epistles (folios 2-163), Acts (163-244), Catholic epistles (245-283), and Apocalypse (283-320). The text does not contain the second and third Epistle of John. The original codex did not contain the Comma Johanneum (in 1 John 5:7), but it was added by a later hand on the margin (see picture). The Comma:

sicut in caelo tres sunt pater uerbum et spiritus et tres sunt (as in heaven three are: the Father, the Word, and the Spirit, they are three).

== History ==
The manuscript was examined and described by H. Brauer, A. Bruckner, G. Scherrer. It was digitised in 2008 and it is available on the site of the Virtual Manuscript Library of Switzerland. Palaeographically the manuscript is dated to the 9th or 10th century. Currently the manuscript is housed at the Abbey library of Saint Gall (63) in St. Gallen.

== See also ==
- List of New Testament Latin manuscripts
- Codex Sangallensis 907
