= Codex Wizanburgensis =

The Codex Wizanburgensis 99 is an 8th-century Latin Vulgate manuscript of the New Testament.

== Contents ==
The Wizanburgensis contains the homilies of Augustine, the Catholic Epistles and the Letters to Timothy, Titus and Philemon among some other works. It is the oldest Latin Vulgate manuscript to contain the Johannine Comma in its main text, with the addition of the words 'sicut et'.
