= Wolfcoz I =

Medieval scribe

Wolfcoz I (floruit first half of the 9th century) was a medieval scribe and painter of illuminated manuscripts, working in the scriptorium of the Abbey of Saint Gall in present-day Switzerland.

He entered the monastery some time before 813, and by 817 was a deacon. He was apparently a confidant of Abbot Gozbert of Saint Gall. 14 known documents by Wolfcoz' hand were created between 816 and 822, including parts of the so-called Wolfcoz Psalter and the Zurich Psalter. In Wolfcoz' time, the scriptorium of the abbey entered a golden age, producing manuscripts of high quality and establishing the Abbey library of Saint Gall as a centre of Alemannic German culture. The abbey library still has three manuscripts penned by Wolfocoz. He developed the Alemannic minuscule and also the decoration of initials.

A later monk with the same name, also active as a scribe at the Abbey of Saint Gall, is sometimes referred to as Wolfcoz II.

== See also ==
- Winithar
