= Codex Ravianus =

Codex Ravianus (also called Berolinensis) is a manuscript rewritten from the Complutensian Polyglot Bible. Formerly it was listed as a Greek manuscript of the New Testament, but it was removed from the list in 1908. The manuscript is a famous instance of the Comma Johanneum.

== Description ==
The codex contains a complete text of the New Testament, in two volumes, on 292 + 205 parchment leaves (size 22.3 cm by 16.5 cm). The leaves are arranged in quarto. It contains a spurious biblical passage, the Comma Johanneum in 1 John 5:7. Although it was rewritten from the Complutensian text, there are some textual divergences between them: Matthew 2:13; 15:22; 17:2; 23:8; 1 John 5:10; Jude 22, which all stem from the errors of the pen of the Ravianus's scribe. The codex was used as an argument in the 18th century that Complutensian was rewritten from the Codex Ravianus, even with imitation of its letters, but scholars like La Croze, Griesbach, and Michaelis proved that errors of Ravianus are nothing more than errors of the pen. It lost its weight as an independent authority.

== History ==
The manuscript is a transcript from the Complutensian Polyglot, printed in 1514. It copies even typographical errors of it, and the letters are similar. Some variant readings were inserted from the margin of Stephanus's edition. According to C. R. Gregory it once belonged to Christian Rave, from Uppsala, or his brother Johannes Rave. It took the name of Ravianus from the name Rave. Johann Jakob Wettstein added it into the list of the Greek New Testament manuscripts, and designated it siglum 110. The text was published by Treschow, while it was examined and described by Griesbach, Georg Gottlieb Pappelbaum (in 1796), and Gregory (in 1900). In 1908 Gregory removed it from the list of the Greek New Testament manuscripts. It is no longer listed, because it is only a facsimile of the Complutensis Polyglot. The manuscript is currently housed in the Berlin State Library (Gr. fol. 1 & 2).
