= Codex Speculum =

5th-century Latin manuscript of the New Testament

The Codex Speculum also called the Speculum Ps-Augustine or the Liber de diuinis scripturis, designated by m, is a 5th-century Latin manuscript collection of passages of florilegia from the New Testament arranged thematically under 144 headings. The text, written on vellum, is a version of the old Latin. The manuscript contains passages from all the books of the New Testament except 3 John, Hebrews, and Philemon on 154 parchment leaves. It also has a citation from the Epistle to the Laodiceans. This text should not be confused with the other, later Speculum attributed to Augustine: Speculum quis ignorat.

The Latin text of the codex is a representative of the Western text-type in itala recension.

The text of the manuscript was published by Cardinal Mai in 1843.

Currently it is housed at the Saint Cross monastery (Sessorianus) in Rome.

== See also ==
- List of New Testament Latin manuscripts
- Codex Corbeiensis I
