= Winithar =

Medieval scribe

Codex Sangallensis 238, the earliest illustrated manuscript from Saint Gall, produced by Winithar between about 760 and 780. This image is from the De natura rerum of Isidore of Seville.

Winithar was a medieval scribe, the earliest known scribe from the scriptorium of the Abbey of Saint Gall in present-day Switzerland.

The birth and death dates of Winithar are not known. He is mentioned for the first time in written sources in 760, and for the following three years he apparently worked as a scribe in the scriptorium of the abbey, and appears to have been the head of the scriptorium. Nine illuminated manuscripts are attributed to Winithar. He wrote excerpts from the Bible, texts by the Church Fathers and two homilies for the abbey library of Saint Gall. Between 765 and 768 he held the position of dean at the abbey.

== See also ==
- Wolfcoz I
