= Edward F. Hills =

American theologian

Edward Freer Hills (1912–1981) was an American Presbyterian scholar, perhaps the most prominent 20th-century advocate of the Byzantine text-type and Textus Receptus.

== Contribution ==
Hills integrates his theological perspective alongside New Testament criticism. "Hills studied with Cornelius Van Til at Westminster, who was a Nestle-Aland text supporter." When Hills began to apply the implications of the presuppositional view of the Bible taught by Van Til, this led him to favor the Traditional Text. Reading John William Burgon inspired Hills to approach textual criticism from a "logic of faith" (1952 is the year that Hills made a definite commitment to this view).

As to the relationship of the King James Bible to the Textus Receptus (Received Text), Hills wrote: "The translators that produced the King James Version relied mainly, it seems, on the later editions of Beza's Greek New Testament, especially his 4th edition (1588-9). But also they frequently consulted the editions of Erasmus and Stephanus and the Complutensian Polyglot. According to Scrivener (1884), (51) out of the 252 passages in which these sources differ sufficiently to affect the English rendering, the King James Version agrees with Beza against Stephanus 113 times, with Stephanus against Beza 59 times, and 80 times with Erasmus, or the Complutensian, or the Latin Vulgate against Beza and Stephanus. Hence the King James Version ought to be regarded not merely as a translation of the Textus Receptus but also as an independent variety of the Textus Receptus."

== Education ==
- Graduated summa cum laude at Yale University (1930–33)
- Th.D. from Westminster Theological Seminary (ca. 1938)
- Th.M. from Columbia Theological Seminary
- Th.D. in New Testament textual criticism from Harvard under the supervision of Henry J. Cadbury, Kirsopp Lake as one of the readers (1946)

== Books ==
- The King James Version Defended: A Christian View of the New Testament Manuscripts, Christian Research Press, 1956, ISBN 0-915923-00-9.
- Believing Bible Study (3rd ed.), 1991 [1967, 1977], ISBN 0-915923-01-7.

== Journal articles ==
Journal of Biblical Literature:

- 'Harmonizations in the Caesarean Text of Mark,' Vol. 66, No. 2 (Jun., 1947), pp. 135-152
- 'The Inter-Relationship of the Caesarean Manuscripts,' Vol. 68, No. 2 (Jun., 1949), pp. 141-159
- 'A New Approach to the Old Egyptian Text,' Vol. 69, No. 4 (Dec., 1950), pp. 345-362
