= De libero arbitrio =

De libero arbitrio may refer to:

- De libero arbitrio voluntatis of Augustine of Hippo
- Lorenzo Valla's Dialogue on Free Will
- De libero arbitrio diatribe sive collatio of Erasmus of Rotterdam

== See also ==
- De servo arbitrio, Luther's response to Erasmus' De libero arbitrio diatribe
