= Complutensian Polyglot Bible =

First printed multi-language Bible

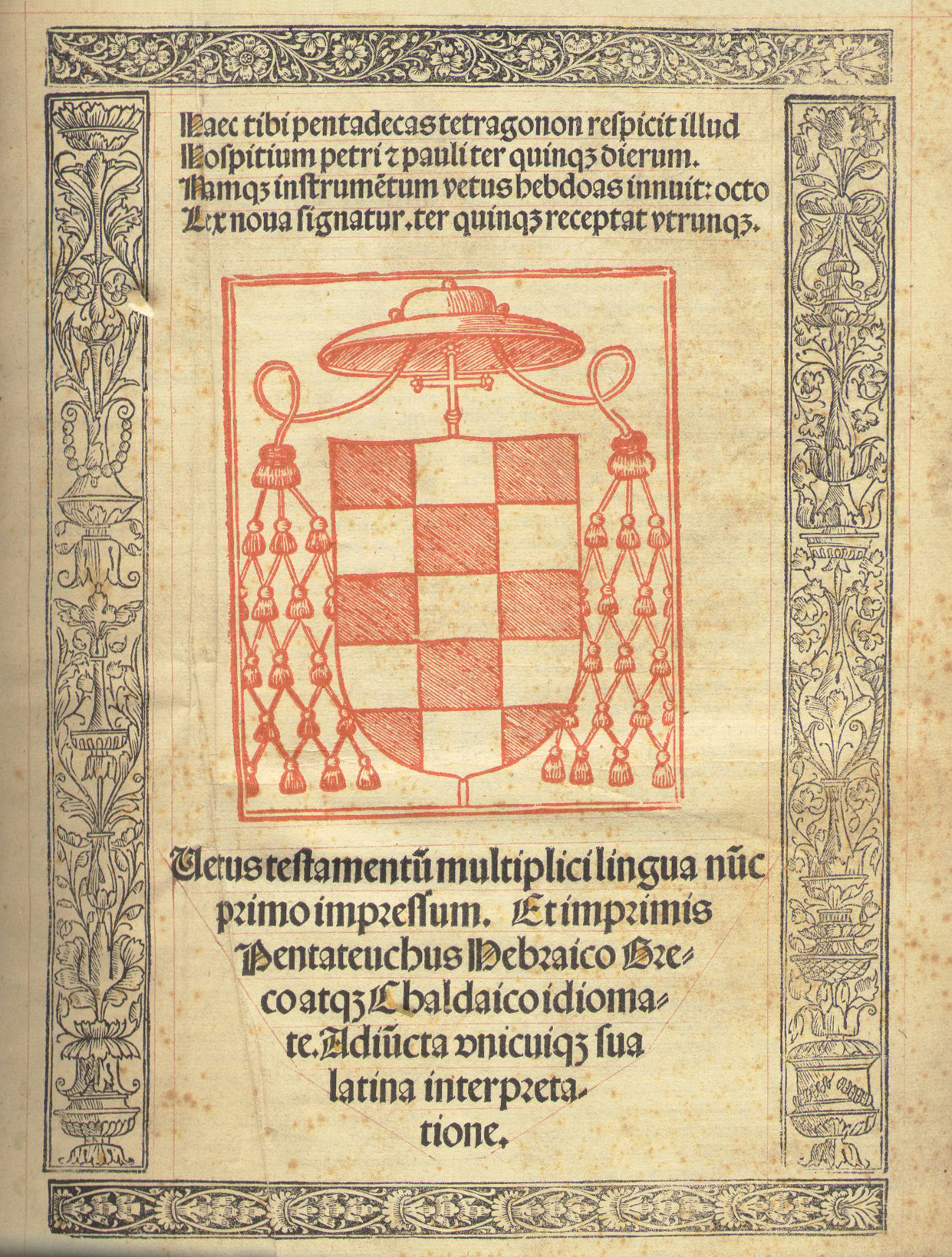
The first page of the Complutensian Polyglot

The Complutensian Polyglot Bible is the name given to the first printed polyglot of the entire Bible. The edition was initiated and financed by Cardinal Francisco Jiménez de Cisneros (1436–1517) and published by Complutense University in Alcalá de Henares, Spain. It includes the first printed editions of the Greek New Testament, the complete Septuagint, and the Targum Onkelos, a translation of the Torah. Although printing occurred from 1514 to 1517, publication and distribution was delayed until 1520 and 1521, respectively.

Not all printed editions survived to be distributed, as several were supposedly lost in a shipwreck. Of the 600 six-volume sets which were printed, only 123 are known to have survived to date.

The Polyglot includes parallels of Biblical texts in Koine Greek, Hebrew, Aramaic, and Latin with glosses in Latin.

== History ==
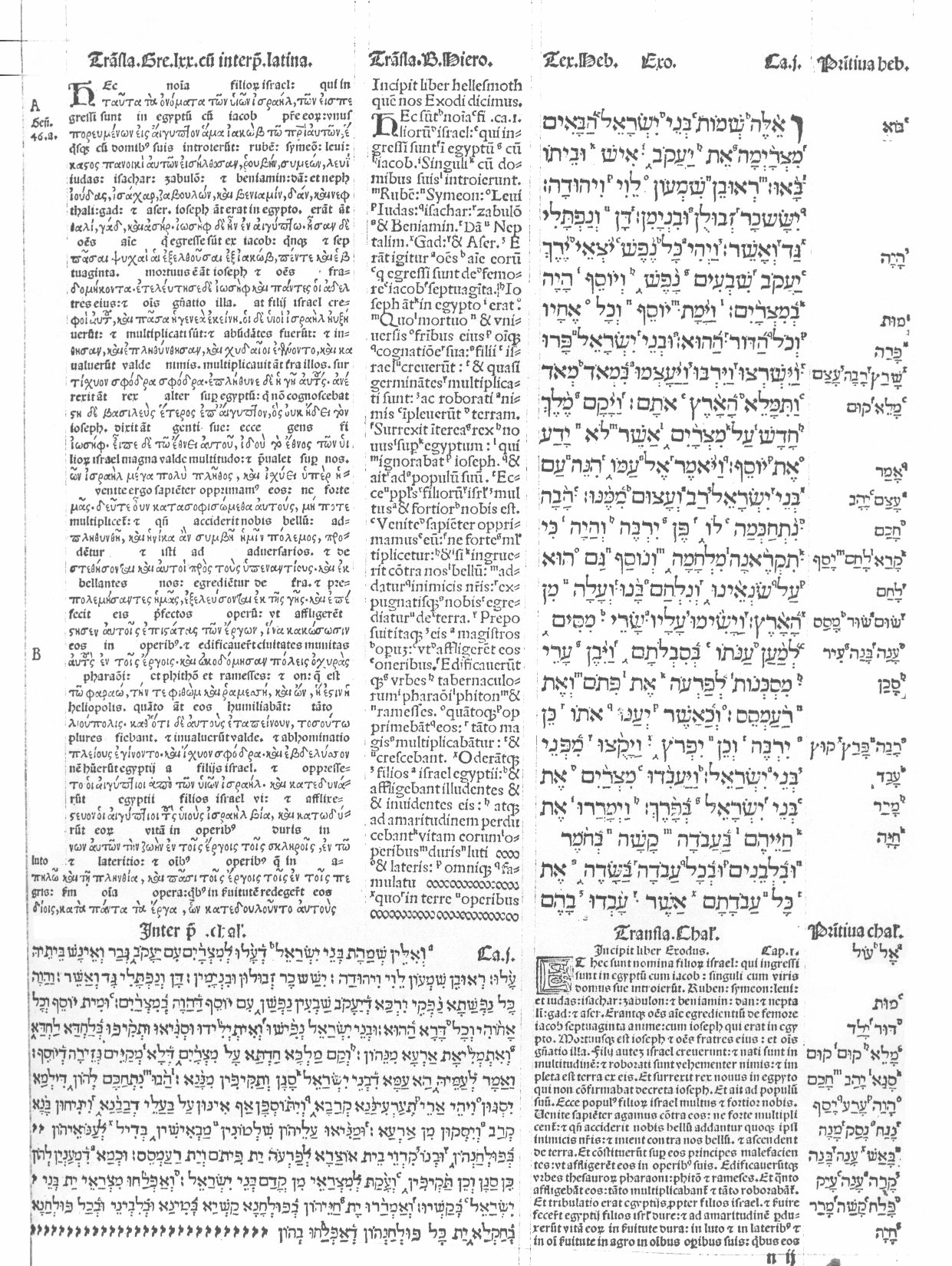
Start of Exodus, recto page. Upper part: Greek LXX with Latin interlinear; Latin Vulgate; Hebrew; Hebrew roots in margin. Lower part: Aramaic; Latin translation of Aramaic; Aramaic roots in margin.

=== Precedents ===
The polyglot Bible was the result of Spain's long-lasting tradition of translations of texts. Through centuries the intellectual class of the Iberian peninsula had developed a deep understanding of the issues of translation and the difficulty of conveying, or even interpreting meaning correctly across languages. Religious texts were known to be particularly difficult due to their high metaphorical content and how dependent on the context in which they were written they tended to be. This sparked a debate in Spain about the convenience of continuing the translation of religious texts, and the best way to do it, over a century prior to the Reformation.

The customary answer to this debate was to ask religious authorities to examine the translation and cross-check and compare different translations with contemporary Castilian, but that in turn created a debate about the qualifications of the religious authority itself to properly translate from the original sources. One of the answers to this debate was the polyglot Bible, which Cisneros hoped would end the issue forever.

=== Translation process ===
Diego López de Zúñiga was the chief editor, and was fluent in Latin as well as both Aramaic and Arabic. He was given a team of various translators. Converted translators and academics were favoured and specifically sought since they were fluent in the source languages and the cultures of the texts. Second in command, Alfonso de Zamora (1476–1544) was a converted Jewish scholar, an expert in Talmudic studies, and spoke Hebrew as his first language. Other conversos working on the project were Alfonso de Alcalá and Pablo de Coronel. Demetrius Ducas (a scholar from Crete), Hernán Núñez de Toledo ("The Pincian") and Juan de Vergara were in charge of the translation from Greek manuscripts. Antonio de Nebrija was specifically called for the translation of the Latin Vulgate. Hernán Núñez de Toledo was also the chief Latinist. The scholars met in Alcalá de Henares, a city near Madrid also known by its Latin name Complutum, at Complutense University.

The New Testament was completed and printed in 1514, but its publication was delayed while work on the Old Testament continued, so they could be published together as a complete work.

=== Delays ===
The Complutensian Old Testament was completed in 1517. Cardinal Cisneros died in July 1517, five months after the Polyglot's completion, and never saw its publication. Further delays happened when, following the death of Cardinal Cisneros, the text was confiscated by the Holy Roman Emperor Charles V.

Erasmus's four-year exclusive privilege in 1516 (and the papal privilege given to the First Biblia Rabbinica in 1518) may have also been a delaying factor: Pope Leo X finally sanctioned it in 1520, at which time the civil war in Castile, the Revolt of the Comuneros, broke out, causing delays.

=== Influence and revisions ===
The immediate direct influence of the Complutensian Polyglot was attenuated because, according to a much later letter of King Philip II of Spain, a significant number of copies were lost in a shipwreck in transit to Italy around 1521. Delays in publishing and distribution of the Polyglot caused the Erasmus Greek New Testament to be distributed before it.

The Aldine Press based the Old Testament text in the 1518 Aldine Bible on the Complutensian's Greek Septuagint, paired with a New Testament based to some extent on Erasmus's version.

Erasmus acknowledged using the Complutensian in the 1527 edition of his Novum Testamentum.

The publication was re-edited as the eight volume Plantin Polyglot (1572), also called the Antwerp Polyglot; it was reprinted with additions as the Paris Polyglot (1645), and further developed into the London Polyglot (1654-1657). Other uses of the include Christian Reineccius's Leipzig Polyglot(1750) and Gratz's reissue at Tubingen (1821.)

== Contents ==
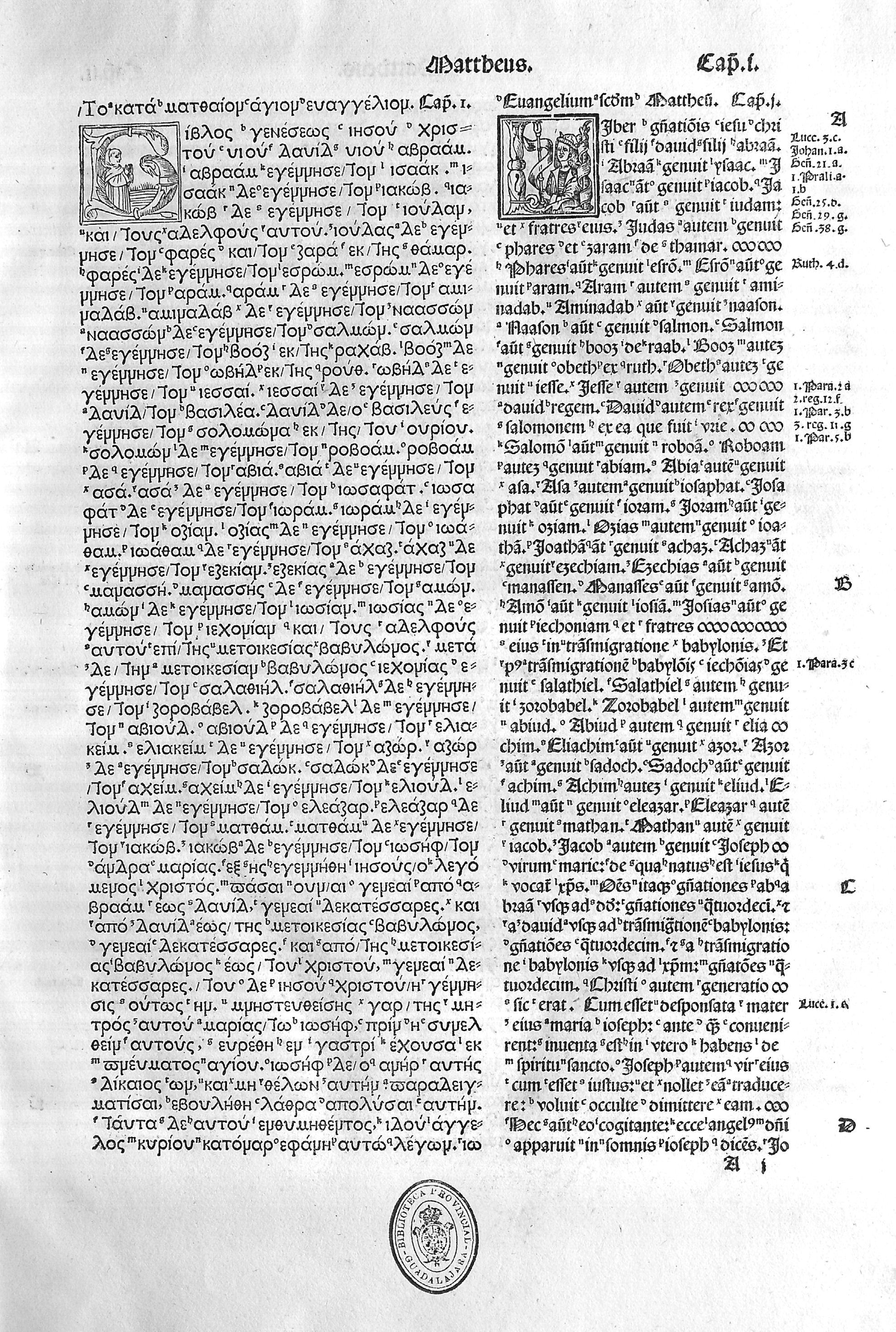
Beginning of the Gospel of Matthew, recto page. Left to right: Greek, Latin Vulgate, cross-references in the margin.

The Complutensian Polyglot Bible was published as a six-volume set. The first four volumes contain the Old Testament. Each page consists of three parallel columns of text: Hebrew on the outside, the Latin Vulgate in the middle (edited by Antonio de Nebrija), and the Greek Septuagint on the inside. On each page of the Pentateuch, the Aramaic text (the Targum Onkelos) and its own Latin translation are added at the bottom. The fifth volume, the New Testament, consists of parallel columns of Greek and the Latin Vulgate. The sixth volume contains various Hebrew, Aramaic, and Greek dictionaries and study aids.

Jerome's Latin version of the Old Testament was placed between the Greek and Hebrew versions. This layout was described by the editors as a parallel to Christ's crucifixion between two criminals; in the case of the Latin Vulgate between the other two languages, it is "a metaphor for the Roman [Catholic] Church rising triumphantly between the [Hebrew/Jewish] Synagogue and the [Greek] Eastern Church". The Latin text was collated by Antonio de Nebrija from manuscript sources, but was left uncorrected. Nebrija eventually resigned from the project after Cisneros refused to allow him to improve the translation, in deference to the desires of the Papacy.

Researchers have still identified only some of the likely source manuscripts used by the Complutensian. Several manuscripts bear a resemblance to the Complutensian, including Minuscule 51, Minuscule 234, Codex Seidelianus II, Minuscule 429 (a.k.a. Guelpherbytanus (E)), and the lost Codex Rhodiensis.

The original notes used by the men who worked on the Polyglot have led to discoveries of their possible sources. There is strong evidence that they relied on the textual-critical methods of Lorenzo Valla's Adnotationes in Novum Testamentum, which had been recently printed by Erasmus in 1505. A copy of that book, with notes possibly from Nebrija, was attached to the notes of the Polyglot.

The Complutensian Polyglot may be one of the first attempts at an eclectic text of the New Testament.

== See also ==
- Collation Novi Testamenti
- Novum Instrumentum omne
- Editio Regia
- Codex Complutensis I
