= Collatio Novi Testamenti =

1447 Latin work by Lorenzo Valla

The Collation of the New Testament (Latin: Collatio Novi Testamenti cum Graeca Veritate) is a 1447 work composed by the Italian humanist Lorenzo Valla (c. 1407–1457) that attempts to correct the Latin Vulgate using Greek marginal notations. The Collation of the New Testament compares four Latin texts of Jerome's fourth-century Vulgate Bible with four Greek manuscripts of the New Testament. Valla designated the Greek text the Graeca veritas or "Greek truth:" that is, the truth of the original Greek.

Valla and his fellow Italian humanists often preferred the original Greek sources for their studies. Valla expanded this from Classical texts to Biblical texts, drawing the ire of Poggio Bracciolini and other critics. In his Collation Valla chose to write a portion of the Vulgate's Latin text, make alterations, and write a note in Greek to support the change. As such it was a rudimentary critical version of the Vulgate, at least for the portions that he collated. This means that Valla's collation was incomplete, and could be better described as a partial collation of the Latin Vulgate using Greek sources for corrections.

== Background ==
The Vulgate had become the predominant Bible translation by A.D. 800, and thousands of handwritten copies of the text were circulated throughout Europe; however, these had numerous errors despite efforts made by medieval scholars to correct the text. Previous to Valla's work, medieval scholars such as Roger Bacon and Nicholas of Lyra had completed similar scriptural comparisons and advocated study of the Bible's original Hebrew and Greek text. The revival of Greek studies in Western Europe and the Vulgate's prominence in the cultural milieu of the continent and its status as the authoritative version of the Bible made it an especially desirable work for humanists to critically examine.

== Overview ==
The Collation of the New Testament was Valla's first comparative study of the original Greek New Testament and the Vulgate, with his Adnotationes in Novum Testamentum being a subsequent though ultimately uncompleted project he dedicated himself to during the mid-1450s; by the end of his life, Valla had completed approximately 2,000 notes on the New Testament. Valla employed humanist philological methods to compare the texts, including favouring the ad sententiam approach against the older medieval ad verbum convention; the former approach critically assessed a word's history and development while the latter convention freely translated between Greek and Latin on a word-for-word basis. By examining the Vulgate's style, vocabulary, and grammar, Valla was able to draw out faulty translations that had obscured the Latin Bible's meaning and other erratum due to copier error. For instance, Valla challenged the Vulgate's translation of the Greek word μετάνοια as "penance" rather than "repentance" and also contended that Jerome had not translated the Vulgate.

Adnotationes in Novum Testamentum would be discovered in 1504 by Erasmus and printed in 1505. It was consulted by the editors of the Complutensian Polyglot in their Greek and Latin columns of the New Testament, an early critical version of the Greek and Latin New Testament.

Valla's analysis of the Vulgate led to criticisms from his fellow humanist Poggio Braccciolini who objected to his tampering with the authoritative Latin text but Valla's work was commended by Cardinal Basilios Bessarion and Nicholas of Cusa. In response to Bracciolini's criticisms Valla responded:

"if I am correcting anything, I am not correcting Sacred Scripture, but rather its translation, and in doing so I am not being insolent toward scripture but rather pious, and I am doing nothing more than translating better than the earlier translator, so that it is my translation—should it be correct—that ought to be called Sacred Scripture, not his."

Valla, like other philologists, thus saw his efforts to assess the accuracy of the Vulgate as an act of service to theology. Although Valla's work was limited, it nevertheless represents one of the first attempts to collate and evaluate the variants present between Greek manuscripts of the New Testament and the Vulgate.

== Influence ==
Valla's Collation of the New Testament is perhaps most significant for being a major influence on the Dutch Christian humanist Desiderius Erasmus of Rotterdam (1466–1536), who came across a copy of Valla's work (a manuscript) in mid-1504 in a library near Louvain and who subsequently published Valla's previously unprinted collation the next year. This gave it a much wider audience than the small number of manuscripts that existed.

Valla's collation helped to convince Erasmus that there was an interest in a new translation of the New Testament. Erasmus would edit and publish an edition of the Greek New Testament, the Novum Instrumentum omne (1516), drawing upon the scholarship of Valla. Many editions of Erasmus' New Testament included both the Greek and Vulgate.

Other scholars influenced by Valla include the group gathered by Cardinal Francisco Jiménez de Cisneros at Alcalá who worked on the Complutensian Polyglot Bible in the early 1500s. Usage of Valla's Adnotationes by Antonio de Nebrija and Hernán Núñez de Toledo, editors of the Complutensian Polyglot Bible, is likely. The Polyglot had parallel columns for both the Vulgate and the critical Greek text.

Interest in the Vulgate New Testament waned in the years following the works of Erasmus, whose Greek editions became the basis for Protestant Bible translators. Both the Novum Instrumentum omne and the Complutensian Polyglot Bible were in print for centuries as subsequent editors and critics printed more comprehensive editions; however, the Collatio and Adnotationes that influenced them both faded from memory.
