= De libero arbitrio diatribe sive collatio =

Book by Erasmus

On the Freedom of the Will
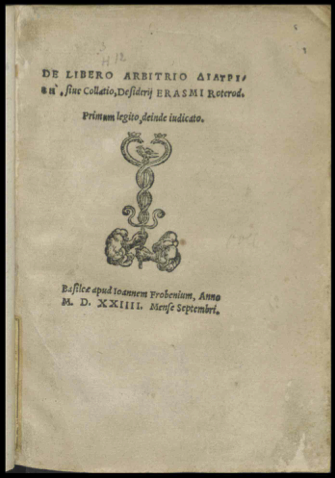
- Title page of first edition printed in Basel
- Author: Erasmus
- Original title: De Libero Arbitrio
- Language: Latin
- Genre: Philosophy, Theology
- Publisher: Johann Froben
- Publication date: September 1524
- Preceded by: Assertio omnium articulorum M. Lutheri per bullam Leonis X
- Followed by: On the Bondage of the Will

De libero arbitrio diatribe sive collatio (literally Of free will: Discourses or Comparisons) is the Latin title of a polemical work written by Desiderius Erasmus of Rotterdam in 1524. It is commonly called The Freedom of the Will or On Free Will in English. It was written to call out Martin Luther's revival of John Wycliffe's alleged teaching that "everything happens by absolute necessity".

Erasmus' civil but deliberately provocative book mixes evangelical concerns that God has revealed himself as merciful not arbitrary ("nobody should despair of forgiveness by a God who is by nature most merciful" I.5.) and the conclusion in the Epilogue that where there are scriptures both in favour and against, theologians should moderate their opinions or hold them moderately: dogma is created by the church not theologians. In his view, a gently held synergism mediates the scriptural passages best, and moderates the exaggerations of both Pelagius (humans meriting or not requiring grace for salvation) and Manichaeus (two Gods: one good, one bad).

In response, Luther wrote his important work On the Bondage of the Will (1525), against which Erasmus in turn wrote the two-volume book Hyperaspistes (1526, 1528), which Luther did not respond to.

== Background ==
De libero arbitrio diatribe sive collatio was nominally written to refute a specific teaching of Martin Luther, on the question of free will. (Note: "Erasmus says that his prefatory remarks pertain to the controversy at hand more than the body of his work. It is more important that he instill moderation in his readers than he make the particular case for free will." McCutcheon, Robert R. (1997). "The Missing Dialogue Concerning the Will Between Erasmus and Luther". Renaissance and Reformation / Renaissance et Réforme. 21 (1): 35–47. doi:10.33137/rr.v33i1.11324. ISSN 0034-429X. JSTOR 43465106.) Luther had become increasingly aggressive in his attacks on the Roman Catholic Church to well beyond irenical Erasmus' reformist agenda. (Note: Historian Volker Leppin noted "anti-Catholicism does not lie at the root of Reformation, even if later on it obviously became part of the whole Reformation framework.")

One of the propositions ascribed to Luther and anathemized by Pope Leo X's bull Exsurge domine (1520) was that "Free will after sin is a matter of title only; and as long as one does what is in him, one sins mortally."

Luther responded, publishing his Latin Assertio omnium articulorum which included the statement "God effects the evil deeds of the impious" as part of the Wycliffian claim that "everything happens by pure necessity," (Note: Latin: esse omnia absoluta et necessaria) so denying free will. (For the popular German version of this work, Luther sanitized his text for Article 36 to remove the arguments that "God is the cause not only of good deeds in man but also of sins, and that there is no natural power of the human will to direct man's actions either for good or for bad.")

Erasmus' mentor Bishop John Fisher published a detailed response to the Latin version's arguments as Confutation of the Lutheran Assertion in 1523. In the same year, Catherine of Aragon's confessor Alphonso de Villa Sancta put out De libero arbitrio aduersus Melanchtonem, on Melancthon's version of Luther's theory.

Erasmus also had decided necessity/free will was a subject of core disagreement deserving a public airing, and strategized for several years with friends and correspondents on how to respond with proper moderation without making the situation worse for all, especially for the rigorous humanist classicist/biblicist/patristic reform agenda of "bonae litterae". He sent the draft to English King Henry VIII for comments, and received a note from Pope Clement VII encouraging publication, and a letter came from Martin Luther recommending he kept silent.

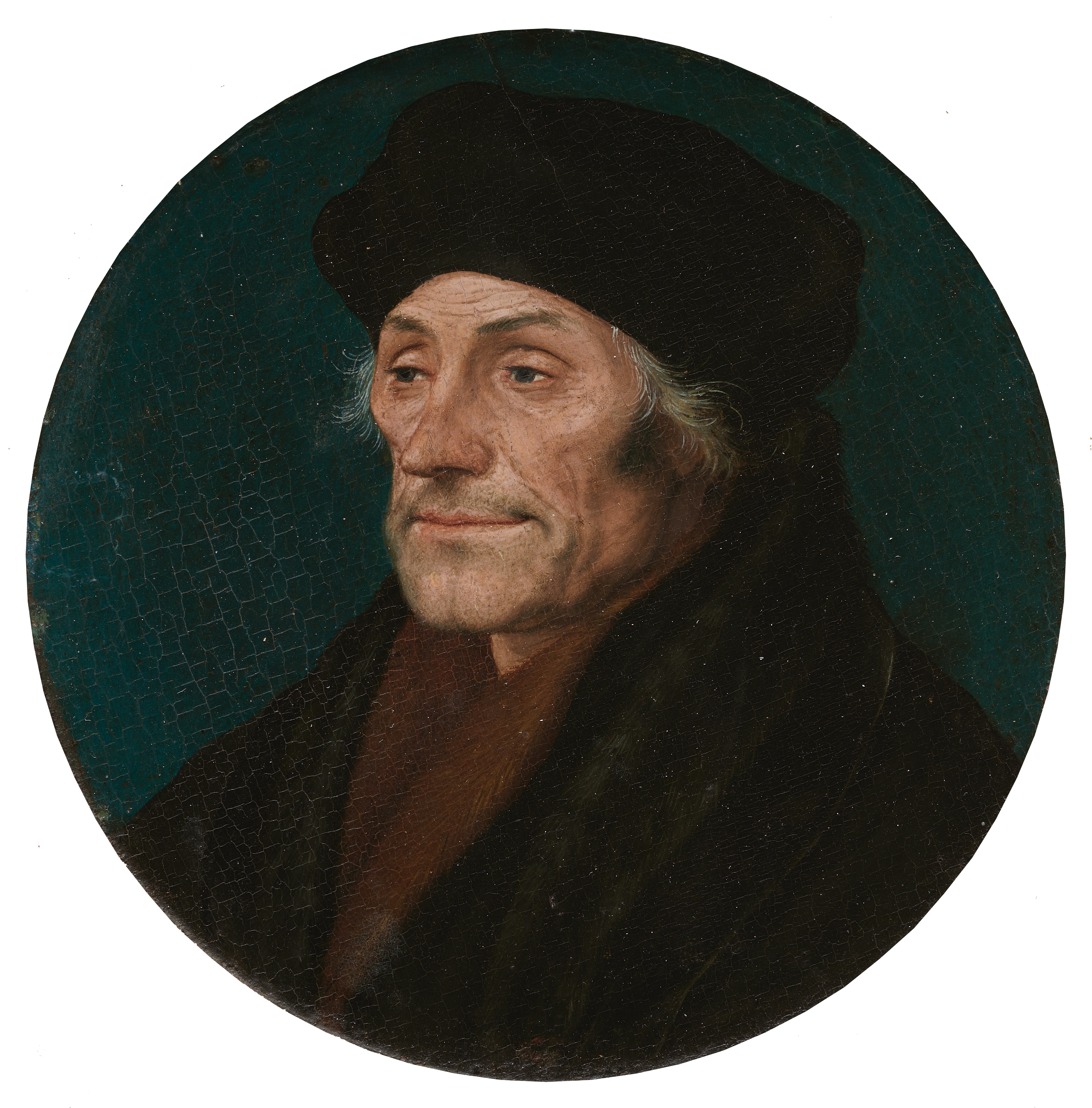
Portrait of Erasmus by Hans Holbein the Younger

Erasmus' eventual irenical strategy had three prongs: (Note: He had adopted a similar strategy the previous year, where the collequy Amicitia presented his positive thoughts on friendship while the Spongia dealt with negative, specific issues mentioning individuals.)

- first, a dialogue Inquisitio de fide to turn down the general heat and danger, and to set the stage for calm debate, which asked the question of whether Lutherans were heretics and, because they accepted the Creed, proposed that Lutherans must not be classed as heretics;
- second, six months later, a small book On Free Will addressed as much to issues of limits of authority, discourse, biblical interpretation, as to free choice of humans in the things of God;
- third, published the same day as On Free Will, a small book De immensa misericordia dei (On the Immense Mercy of God), written ostensibly as a model sermon which provided Erasmus' positive alternative to Luther's idea in a non-controversial genre, (Note: Erasmus further removed some polemical material on the request of Bishop Christoph von Utenheim, the beloved Bishop of Basel.) without mentioning him. (Note: Erasmus did not approve of the language of merit being used for our human response to grace. The 1547 English translation has "Now if there be nothing here that thou mayst ascribe to thy merits, then glorify the mercy of God, worship the mercy of God, embrace and kiss the mercy of God.") It set up that God was not arbitrary, against the claims of predestination; notably it sets "mercy" as a synonym for all kinds of grace, allowing a far broader range of scriptures to be applied than those that used the term "grace": (Note: We might say that Erasmus proposed sola misericordia instead of sola gratia.) "What is the grace of God, if not the mercy of God?" (Note: "For the moment, to help you understand the full breadth of the Lord's immense mercy, you should know that in Holy Writ the word 'mercy' sometimes implies munificence, sometimes prevenient grace, or elevating grace, and quite often consoling grace; elsewhere it implies medicinal grace, but very often pardoning grace, or even punishing grace.") (It also warns the audience against Manicheeism, which proposed two Gods, the just but not equally good God of the Old Testament, and the good but not equally just God of the New.)

=== Terminology ===
- Synergism is the idea that adult salvation or justification involves some sort of unequal co-operation (noting that the co- does not connote equality of the parties, God's grace always being in some way prior and unearned.) This is the view that Erasmus believes explains scripture and tradition better in On Free Will. One version of this is the doctrine of prevenient grace associated with Augustine, who taught that without grace the will is captive.
- Monergism is the idea that God brings about an individual's salvation or justification regardless of their co-operation. This is the view associated with the early leaders of the Reformation such as Martin Luther. One version of this is the doctrine of irresistible grace associated with John Calvin.
- Semi-Pelagianism is the idea that the commencement of conversion is a free choice, with grace supervening only later.
- Pelagianism is the idea that humans have free will to achieve perfection. In some popular Protestant views (such as this website) synergism, semi-Pelagianism and Pelagianism reduce to effectively the same position, which is that humankind is basically good.

== Content ==
A scholar has commented: "De Libero Arbitrio is clear in what it opposes, less so in what it affirms" about free will. However, another has commented that "The most important and lasting legacy of Erasmus' theology was its nuance": what is being strongly affirmed is not free choice per se but a hermeneutic. Because of his irenical anti-Scholasticism, (Note: His philosophia Christiani "demonstrates the combination of Biblical precepts and the wisdom of ancient scholars without referring back to the medieval scholastic tradition." Wolf, Erik (1 January 1978). "Religion and Right in the Philosophia Christriana of Erasmus from Rotterdam". UC Law Journal. 29 (6): 1535. ISSN 0017-8322.) Erasmus attempted to argue without dogmatism, over-systematization, insult or much appeal to Scholastic methods. (Note: "Erasmus’ tract…is a showpiece of his methodology. He begins his argumentation in the classic skeptical fashion by collating scriptural evidence for and against the concept of free will and demonstrating that there is no consensus and no rational way of resolving the resulting dilemma." Rummel, Erika; MacPhail, Eric (2021). "Desiderius Erasmus". The Stanford Encyclopedia of Philosophy. Metaphysics Research Lab, Stanford University.)

The conclusions Erasmus reached also drew upon a large array of notable authorities, including, from the Patristic period, Origen, John Chrysostom, Ambrose, Jerome, and Augustine, in addition to many leading Scholastic authors, such as Thomas Aquinas and Duns Scotus. He also engaged with recent thought on the state of the question, including the perspectives of the via moderna school and of Lorenzo Valla, whose ideas he rejected.

=== Preface ===
Erasmus' thesis was not simply in favour of undogmatic synergism, (Note: Erasmus also expressed this view in 1499's Prayer of Erasmus of Rotterdam to the Son of the Virgin, Jesus as "It is a great thing, I know, that a wretched worm asks of Thee, not only beyond his merits, but beyond human prayers and human understanding.... Therefore, not for my merits, which are none or evil, but by thyself, I beseech Thee. . . " Rice, Eugene F. (1950). "Erasmus and the Religious Tradition, 1495-1499". Journal of the History of Ideas. 11 (4): 387–411. doi:10.2307/2707589. ISSN 0022-5037. JSTOR 2707589.) but that Luther's assertive theology was not grounded and bounded adequately, as can be seen from the headings of the Preface:

1. Luther's supposed infallibility
2. Objectivity and scepticism
3. Having an open mind
4. Difficulties in the scripture
5. Essence of Christian piety
6. Man's limited capacity to know
7. Unsuitability of Luther's teachings

Luther's response to these (ignoring the first point) had the headings: Assertions in Christianity; No liberty to be a sceptic; Clarity of scriptures; Crucial issue: Knowing free will; Foreknowledge of God; Tyranny of Laws; the Christian's peace; Christian liberty; Spontenaity of necessitated acts; Grace and free will.

For Erasmus, the heart of the issue was not theology but the role of prudence in limiting what can be claimed theologically: "what a loophole the publication of this opinion would open to godlessness among innumerable people."

Erasmus asserted that over-definition of doctrine (whether by Church Councils or by Luther's assertions) historically leads to violence and more schism or heresy. The mentality and mechanisms of heretic-hunting were encouraged, not relieved, by adding to the articles of faith (such as requiring belief for or against free will), this hunting then requiring terrors and threats. Erasmus' extremely tentative affirmation (of synergism) comes from these reflections: not only is any nasty disputation un-Christian, but the assertion of extra doctrines promotes, in effect, evil. Later opposing commenters interpreted this as that Erasmus loved Peace more than Truth.

He found no justification in consensus or history for Luther's idea on necessity, except for Manichaeus and John Wycliff.

He suggested that his (and, implicitly, Luther's) own preferences might owe to personality more than to other sources. These were "red rags to a bull" for Luther. (Note: "which he must have guessed would provoke Luther to reply, in his De servo arbitrio, with such vehemence that no reconciliation of views was possible." Kerr, Fergus (2005). "Comment: Erasmus". New Blackfriars. 86 (1003): 257–258. doi:10.1111/j.0028-4289.2005.00081.x. ISSN 0028-4289. JSTOR 43250928.)

=== Free Will ===
Erasmus adopted an unusual definition of Free Will: the ability of an individual to turn themselves to the things of God. So this included not only conversion but more general daily moments.

In his response, Luther split his definition of Free Will to cover on the one hand moral things—where he allowed free choice to operate— and on the other hand conversion issues—where predestination was the proper explanation to the necessary exclusion of free choice.

=== Synergism and Causation ===
Erasmus explains prevenient grace by the analogy of a pre-toddler, too weak to walk on his own yet. His parent shows the child an apple as an incentive, and supports the child as the child takes steps towards the apple. But the child could not have raised himself without the parent's lifting, nor seen the apple without the parent's showing, nor have stepped without the parent's support, nor grasped the apple unless the parent put it into his small hands. So the child owes everything to the parent, yet the child has not done nothing. (s57)

This example is similar to one John Wycliffe gave in Tractatus de universabilus.

=== Pan-Biblical Evidence ===
Erasmus took his evidence not so much from one explicit Bible passage, but also from the innumerable passages that command humans to do things. (Note: "Gerhard O. Forde represents Erasmus’ method as a “box score” method, whereas Luther might rely on just “one passage” to convince of truth." Pekham, John (2007). "An Investigation of Luther's View of the Bondage of the Will with Implications for Soteriology and Theodicy". Journal of the Adventist Theological Society. 18 (2).) In view of the dozens of passages analyzed "So it is impossible to avoid the conclusion that there is in us a will that can turn one way or the other." God, being neither mad nor cruel, would not command humans to do things that are completely impossible: believing or converting is one. (Note: That Erasmus preferred to use patristic, scriptural and rhetorical arguments does not mean that dialectical Scholastic conclusions were different: e.g. Thomas Aquinas' Summa Theologica "Man has free-will: otherwise counsels, exhortations, commands, prohibitions, rewards, and punishments would be in vain." Q.83 Art 1 "SUMMA THEOLOGIAE: Free-will (Prima Pars, Q. 83)". www.newadvent.org.) These commands make no sense without free-will: the justice of God requires natural justice: humans cannot be held responsible if they have no choice, a point notably made by Anselm of Canterbury and John Wycliffe.

As far as God is concerned, Luther's view was that God can do anything (voluntarism), even logically impossible things (which appear to us as paradoxes), and that they are good because God did them (nominalism); while Erasmus' view is that God really is good (realism) and nothing bad can be ascribed to him.

=== Foreknowledge and predestination ===
In part, the disputation between Erasmus and Luther came down to differences of opinion regarding the doctrines of divine justice and divine omniscience and omnipotence. While Luther and many of his fellow reformers prioritized the control and power which God held over creation, Erasmus prioritized the justice and liberality of God toward humankind.

Luther and other reformers proposed that humanity was stripped of free will by sin and that divine predestination ruled all activity within the mortal realm. They held that God was completely omniscient and omnipotent; that anything which happened had to be the result of God's explicit will, and that God's foreknowledge of events in fact brought the events into being.

Erasmus however argued that foreknowledge did not equal predestination. Instead, Erasmus compared God to an astronomer who knows that a solar eclipse is going to occur. The astronomer's foreknowledge does nothing to cause the eclipse—rather his knowledge of what is to come proceeds from an intimate familiarity with the workings of the cosmos. Erasmus held that, as the creator of both the cosmos and mankind, God was so intimately familiar with his creations that he was capable of perfectly predicting events which were to come, even if they were contrary to God's explicit will. He cited biblical examples of God offering prophetic warnings of impending disasters which were contingent on human repentance, as in the case of the prophet Jonah and the people of Nineveh.

=== Free will and the problem of evil ===
If humans had no free will, Erasmus argued, then God's commandments and warnings would be vain; and if sinful acts (and the calamities which followed them) were in fact the result of God's predestination, then that would make God a cruel tyrant who punished his creations for sins he had forced them to commit. Rather, Erasmus insisted, God had endowed humanity with free will, valued that trait in humans, and rewarded or punished them according to their own choices between good and evil. He argued that the vast majority of the biblical texts either implicitly or explicitly supported this view, and that divine grace was the means by which humans became aware of God, as well as the force which sustained and motivated humans as they sought of their own free will to follow God's laws.

=== Erasmus's conclusion ===
Erasmus ultimately concluded that God was capable of interfering in many things (human nature included) but chose not to do so; thus God could be said to be responsible for many things because he allowed them to occur (or not occur), without having been actively involved in them. In no way should God be said to be the cause of evil which Luther had said in his Latin Assertio.

Erasmus notes that there are many passages in Scripture "which seem to set forth free choice" but also that "others seem to take it wholly away." Because the issue came down to broadest biblical interpretation (i.e., Total Depravity, etc.), rather than dispute over individual passages or philosophy, Erasmus held that the safe approach was to favour the historical interpretation of the church—in this case synergism—over that of a novel individual.

== Aftermath ==
Luther's assistant, Phillip Melancthon disagreed with Luther that both good and evil come about by necessity as a "Stoic and Manichaean absurdity", and welcomed Erasmus' small book. In 1535, he defended synergism; "Grace precedes; the will follows. God draws; but he draws [only] the man who is willing."

Luther's response to Erasmus came a year later in 1525's On the Bondage of the Will, which Luther himself later considered one of his best pieces of theological writing. (Note: "It is one of his most vigorous and profound books, full of grand ideas and shocking exaggerations, that border on Manichaeism and fatalism." Schaff, Philip. History of the Christian Church, Volume VII. ch 73.) Other writers are repelled by it. (Note: "From beginning to end his work, for all its positive features, is a torrent of invective. (Luther says) The Diatribe (On free Will) sleeps, snores, is drunk, does not know what it is saying, etc. Its author is an atheist, Lucian himself, a Proteus, etc.Augustijn, Cornelis (2001). "Twentieth-Annual Birthday Lecture: Erasmus as Apologist: The Hyperaspistes II". Erasmus of Rotterdam Society Yearbook. 21 (1): 1–13. doi:10.1163/187492701X00038.)

=== Hyperaspistes ===
In early 1526, Erasmus replied immediately with the first part of his two-volume Hyperaspistes; this first volume concerned biblical interpretation. The second, larger volume was a longer and more complex work which received comparatively little popular or scholarly awareness; (Note: For example, it was not available English until 1999. Augustijn, Cornelis (2001). "Twentieth-Annual Birthday Lecture: Erasmus as Lecture: Birthday Apologist: The Hyperaspistes II". Erasmus of Rotterdam Society Yearbook. 21 (1): 1–13. doi:10.1163/187492701X00038.) the second volume concerned free will, with paragraph by paragraph rebuttal of Luther. Erasmus regarded Luther's doctrine of total depravity as an exaggeration, and noted that an inclination to evil did not exist in Jesus nor in his mother.

"What the Church reads with profit when written by Augustine, Luther ruins with atrocious words and hyperboles,...(like)...the absolute necessity of all things."

— Erasmus, Hyperaspistes II

As with John Fisher's Confutation, Luther did not respond to the Hyperaspistes.

=== On Grace ===
In 1528, Erasmus produced his editio princeps of Faustus of Riez book On Grace from the mid to late 400s. Faustus "teaches that God’s grace always encourages, precedes and helps our will; and whatever free will alone will have acquired by virtue of the labour of a pious mercy is not our merit, but grace’s gift."

=== Catholic and Protestant ===
Erasmus and Luther's debate had great impact, with Catholic writers including Erasmus placing an increased emphasis on grace and faith (i.e. what God does rather than how humans should respond), while many Protestants, (Note: "Was Lutheranism Lutheran? When it crystallized in the Formula of Concord ... it rejected the logic of predestinationism implied in Luther's Bondage of the Will.MacCulloch, Diarmaid (2006). "2. Protestantism in Mainland Europe: New Directions". Renaissance Quarterly. 59 (3): 698–706. doi:10.1353/ren.2008.0404. S2CID 162265932.) notably Luther's second-in-command Philip Melancthon, and the later Arminians (such as Wesleyans) adopted aspects of Erasmus' view. Some historians have even said that "the spread of Lutheranism was checked by Luther’s antagonizing (of) Erasmus and the humanists."

American/German Reformed encyclopaedist Philip Schaff summarized it: "Melanchthon, no doubt in part under the influence of this controversy, abandoned his early predestinarianism as a Stoic error (1535), and adopted the synergistic theory. Luther allowed this change without adopting it himself, and abstained from further discussion of these mysteries. The Formula of Concord re-asserted in the strongest terms Luther’s doctrine of the slavery of the human will, but weakened his doctrine of predestination, and assumed a middle ground between late Augustinianism and semi-Pelagianism. In like manner the Roman Catholic Church, while retaining the greatest reverence for St. Augustin and endorsing his anthropology, never sanctioned his views on total depravity and unconditional predestination, but condemned them, indirectly, in the Jansenists." Even Luther, in a late work, "reaffirmed the distinction of the secret and revealed will of God, which we are unable to harmonize, but for this reason he deems it safest to adhere to the revealed will and to avoid speculations on the impenetrable mysteries of the hidden will": the avoidance of speculation and dogmatic assertions on adiophora being core points in Erasmus' On Free Will. where so-called "semi-Pelagianism" here includes synergism.

The Sixth Session (1549), Chapter V of the Council of Trent defined a form of synergism similar to Erasmus'.

Dutch theologian Jacob Arminius developed a softer form of Calvinism by adapting a version of Erasmus' infant-and-apple analogy: Arminius' analogy for the gift of faith was "a rich man gives a poor and famishing beggar alms by which he may be able to sustain himself and his family. Does it cease to be a pure, undiluted gift because the beggar extends his hand for receiving?" This formulation perhaps re-casts Erasmus' positive requirement for co-operation (itself an effect of prevenient grace) as a negative requirement of being ready and not refusing.

In 1999 the Catholic Church and the Lutheran World Federation (later joined by many other Protestant denominations) made a Joint Declaration on the Doctrine of Justification on a common understanding of justification, concluding that the theological positions mutually anathematized at the time of the Reformation were not, in fact, held by the churches.

A 2017 survey of U.S. Protestants found that fewer than half accepted a view similar to Luther's sola fide, including in "white mainline churches".

== Translations ==
- Luther and Erasmus: Free Will and Salvation, translated and edited by E. Gordon Rupp, Philip S. Watson (Philadelphia, The Westminster Press, 1969)
- The Battle over Free Will. Edited, with notes, by Clarence H. Miller. Translated by Clarence H. Miller and Peter Macardle. (Hackett Publishing, 2012)
- Discourse on Free Will by Ernst F. Winter (Continuum International Publishing, 2005)
