= Alfonso de Alcalá =

Alfonso de Alcalá (Alcalá la Real, fl. 1520s) was a Spanish physician, professor of medicine and also Hebraist. He is to be distinguished from the Hebraist Alfonso de Zamora.

He was formerly a physician, but converted to Christianity prior to the expulsion of the Jews from Spain in 1492. Cardinal Ximenez de Cisneros commissioned him, together with Alfonso of Zamora and Paul Nuñez Coronel to provide a new translation of the Hebrew Bible into Latin for the Complutensian Polyglot (1514–17).
