= Seyfried Rybisch =

Silesian nobleman and humanist

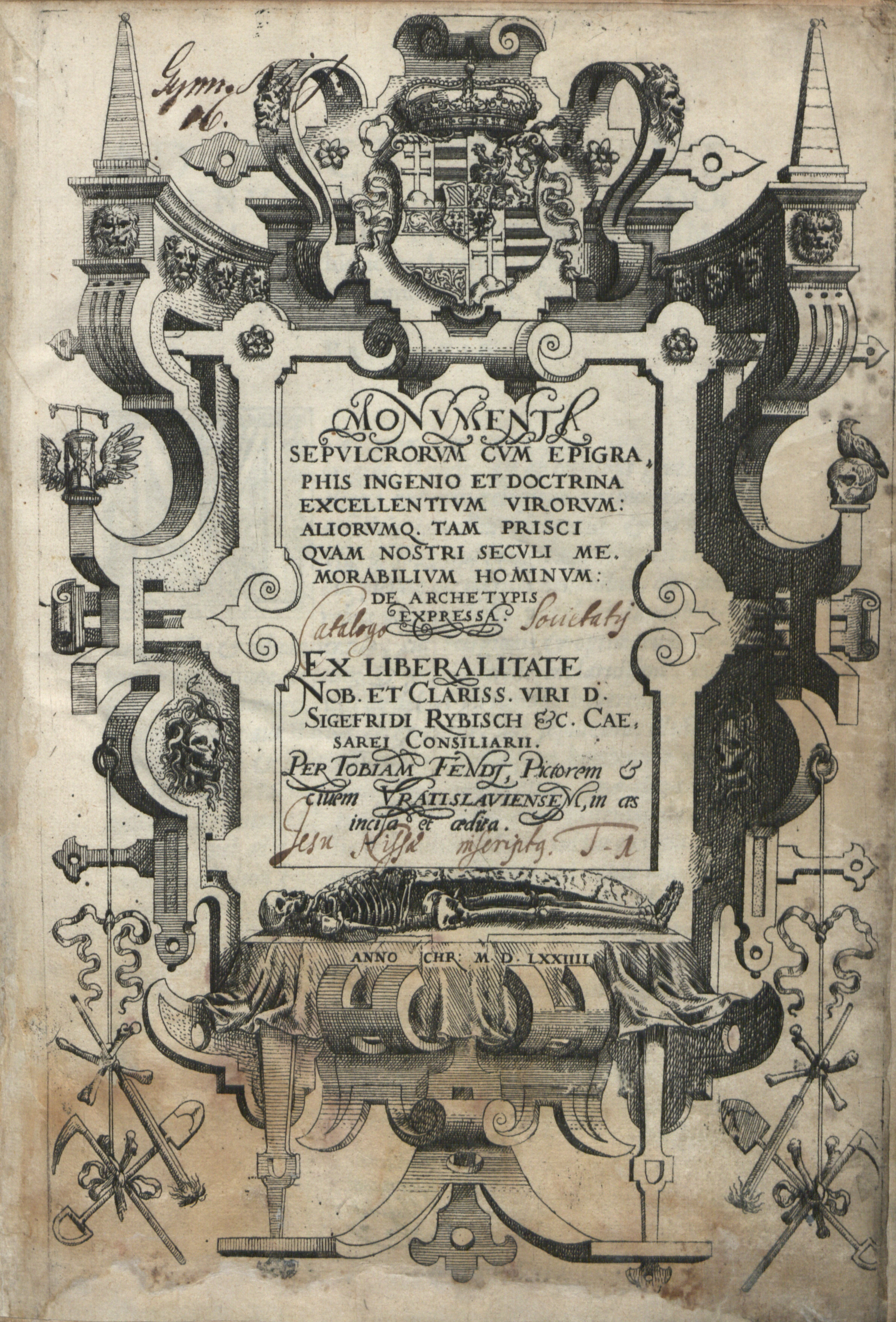
Frontispiece of Fendt's Monumenta (1574), giving credit to Rybisch

Seyfried Rybisch (13 September 1530 – 17 August 1584) was a Silesian nobleman and humanist from Breslau (Wrocław). He served as an Imperial counsellor in Silesia and Hungary from 1559 until his death, but he is best known for his description of two academic pilgrimages undertaken between 1548 and 1554.

== Life ==
=== Academic pilgrimages ===
Seyfried Rybisch (Note: Hiernard 2017, "Introduction", gives many variations on the first name (Siegfried, Siffrit, Seifried, Sigfridus) and last name (Ribisch, Ribsch, Ribsche, Rebsch, Reybisch, Riebisch).) was born in Breslau on 13 September 1530. Named for his paternal grandfather, he was the second son and fifth and last child of Heinrich Rybisch by his first wife, Anna von Rindfleisch. His family belonged to the local patrician class and the imperial nobility. No portrait of him is known, although there are several of his father. In 1542, his father sent him to study Latin and Greek from Johannes Troger, the city physician of Görlitz. In 1545, he enrolled in the Protestant gymnasium in Strasbourg to study under Johannes Sturm. There he lived with Martin Bucer. He returned to Breslau in 1548.

Only two weeks after his return, Rybisch set out on an "academic pilgrimage" (peregrinatio academica) to France. En route he witnessed the Diet of Augsburg and the aftermath of the 1546 magazine explosion in Mechelen. His travels in France took him to Paris, Orléans, Angers and Poitiers. In December 1548, he attended the wedding of Francis, Duke of Aumale, and Anna d'Este in Paris. In 1549, he attended the coronation of Catherine de' Medici in Paris (10 June) and witnessed the entry of King Henry II. He was hosted on one occasion by Charles de Cossé, Count of Brissac, who spoke German. He spent much of his time in actual studies, including in both laws, but there is no evidence he ever received a degree. He was registered with the "German" nation at the University of Orléans in 1550–1551. In Poitiers, he signed the album amicorum of Christoph van Teuffenbach. He also asked the locals about the battle of Poitiers in 732. At the University of Bourges, he studied under Eguinaire Baron and François Douaren. In Geneva, he heard the preaching of John Calvin, although without meeting him. As he prepared to return home, he saw in Nuremberg the effects of the Margrave's War of 1552.

Rybisch returned to Breslau in January 1553, travelling from Nuremberg in the company of the Bohemian nobleman Florian Griespek von Griespach. During their leisurely passage through Bohemia, he and Griespek stayed in the castles of the upper nobility, including Roudnice nad Labem, and passed time hunting. In April, Rybisch set out from Breslau on a second pilgrimage to Italy, which included stays in Padua, Bologna, Rome and Naples. He was registered with the German nation at the University of Padua in 1553 and Bologna in 1554. In 1553 in Venice, he attended the funeral of Doge Francesco Donà and the coronation of the new doge, Marcantonio Trevisan, on 4 June 1553. In Genoa in 1553, he met Andrea Doria. He saw the large fleet being assembled for the reconquest of French-occupied Corsica. During his time in Naples, he saw Monte Nuovo, formed by an eruption in 1538. In late 1554, he saw the French banners captured in the battle of Marciano hanging in the church of San Lorenzo, Florence. He returned to Breslau in December 1554 or January 1555.

=== Later life ===
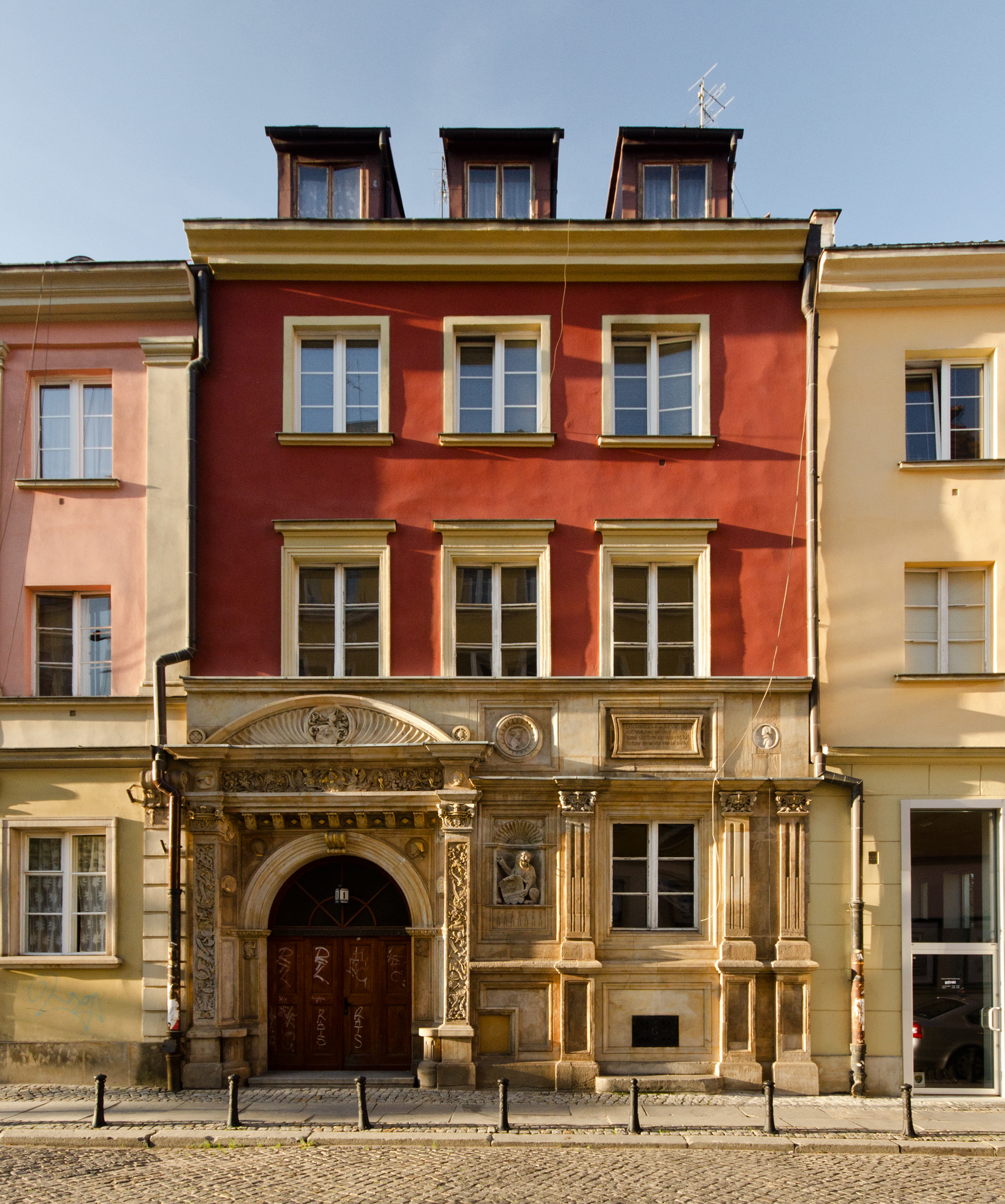
The mansion that Heinrich Rybisch built between 1526 and 1531

After Rybisch's return to Silesia, the Emperor-elect Ferdinand I granted him a prebend in the church of the Holy Cross, despite the fact that he was a Lutheran. In June 1560, on the eve of his first marriage, he was replaced as prebendary by Bishop Balthasar von Promnitz. From 1559 to 1568, Rybisch served as an imperial counsellor on the court chamber for Silesia. Upon his request, Maximilian II transferred him to the court chamber of the Kingdom of Hungary, where he served from 1568 to 1571, living in Pressburg (Bratislava). (Note: These offices are explained in Fazekas 2019, p. 185. Sparrow 1969, p. 28, translates Rybisch's position as "chancellor of the exchequer".) In 1571, he returned to Silesia and rejoined the chamber there. In 1573, his older brother Heinrich ceded to him their father's mansion, while Maximilian II rewarded him for his services with a second house on the same street. From his various letters, it is apparent that Rybisch was criticized as a poor politician. In a letter to Johannes Crato von Krafftheim, he suggests that his critics lacked a full understanding of matters.

Rybisch died on 17 August 1584. His place of burial is unknown, but was probably Saint Elizabeth's Church alongside his first wife. In 1593, Salomon Frenzel von Friedenthal dedicated an epigram to him praising his learning and his library.

== Marriages and children ==
In August 1560, Rybisch married Katharina, daughter of Kaspar von Czeschau of the County of Kladsko. They had a son, Ehrenfried, and a daughter, Mariana, who died at Pressburg during an outbreak of plague in 1570. Another daughter, Katharina, died in 1571, while another, Maria, married Ludwig Pfinzing in 1576. They had two sons, Seyfried, who died young, and Gottfried, who grew up to hold several lordships in Silesia. Rybisch's first wife died on 15 septembre 1572. Sometime after October 1575, he married Maria von Redern of the Altmark. Georg Tilenus, the father of Daniel Tilenus, composed an epithalamium in Latin for his second marriage. Maria died in 1597. There is uncertainty concerning whether he had any children with his second wife, with some sources listing two sons, Liebfried and Ehrenfried.

== Works ==
Rybisch never published any writings in his lifetime.

Rybisch's main work, the Itinerarium, is an account in Latin of his two academic pilgrimages, covering the period from 1540 until the end of his second pilgrimage. It was based on notes taken at the time, but was not written until the 1570s and completed only after 1574. Although he writes dispassionately, he occasionally betrays his Protestantism, as when labels the Marian veneration at Notre-Dame de Cléry a "superstition" and the relics kept in the Lateran "infantile". There are two manuscript copies of this work at the University of Wrocław, one complete and one partial. A third partial copy is lost. It is uncertain if the work was ever intended to be printed, but it certainly circulated in manuscript. It was known, for instance, by Nathan Chytraeus, who copied from it the epitaph of Bishop Jean Olivier, which was of special interest to Protestants.

The Itinerarium is not a particularly unique work. It may be compared to the travel accounts of Johann Fichard (1536) or Germain Audebert (1585). Like them, Rybisch mingled the use of written sources with his own firsthand observations. His value as a source comes from his occasional observation or notation of details others missed or passed over. For example, he is the last person to record having seen Lorenzo Valla's tomb, locating it underneath the monumental bronze Lex de imperio Vespasiani behind the altar of Saint John Lateran. Since Aernout van Buchel was told in 1588 that it had been removed because of Valla's exposure of the Donation of Constantine as a forgery, Rybisch's testimony allows its removal and destruction to be connected with Pope Gregory XIII's removal of the Lex de imperio to the Palazzo dei Conservatori in 1576.

Rybisch helped produce two published works of which he was not the author. He conducted extensive research for a general history of Silesia, but entrusted the writing of it to Joachim Cureus, who also consulted the Origines Wratislavienses of Franz Köckritz. The resulting work, Gentis Silesiae Annales, was published at Wittenberg in 1571. In 1574, Rybisch funded the Monumenta sepulcrorum cum epigraphis ingenio et doctrina excellentium virorum, a deluxe printing by Krispin Scharffenberg of 129 copper engravings (including 150 inscriptions) by Tobias Fendt. The engravings show the funeral monuments of illustrious men, some made after the descriptions and sketches of Rybisch, whose name appears on the frontispiece. This was a popular work, the sixth edition of which was printed at Utrecht in 1671.
