= Pablo de Coronel =

Spanish Hebraist and professor of Hebrew (1480–1534)

Pablo de Coronel or Paul Nuñez Coronel (Segovia c.1480 – Salamanca, 30 September 1534) was a Spanish Hebraist, and professor of Hebrew at the University of Salamanca. He trained to be a rabbi, but converted to Christianity prior to the expulsion of the Jews from Spain in 1492. Cardinal Ximenez de Cisneros commissioned him, together with Alfonso de Alcalá, of Alcalá la Real, to provide a new translation of the Hebrew Bible into Latin for the Complutensian Polyglot (1514–17). He worked alongside another converso Hebraist, Alfonso de Zamora. He was one of three scholars to take over Zamora's chair in Hebrew at the University of Salamanca.

He also wrote a commentary on the work of Nicolas de Lyre (c 1330), "Additiones ad Librum Nicolai Lirani de Differentiis Translationum (Verborum)," which survives only in manuscript.
