= Alfonso de Zamora =

Jewish-Spanish scholar

Alfonso de Zamora (1474 – c. 1545-6) was a Jewish-Spanish scholar and a major contributor to the Complutensian Polyglot Bible. Like many Spanish Jews during the persecutions of the 15th century, Alfonso converted to Catholicism while privately remaining a Jew.

== Biography ==
Born in Zamora, Spain in 1474, Alfonso was the son of Juan de Zamora, a learned Jew. He attended a Yeshiva, probably the famous Campanton Yeshiva until the age of 18, when he and his family left for Portugal in 1492, before returning in about 1497, already baptized. Sources disagree on the exact date of his baptism, with some suggesting 1492 or 1506. Historian Ahuva Ho argues that Alfonso likely continued to secretly practice Judaism for the rest of his life.

Alfonso was a professor of the Hebrew and Aramaic languages at the University of Salamanca until 1512, when he was moved to the University of Alcalá. Both Francisco Jiménez de Cisneros and Alfonso de Fonseca were patrons of his work.

In 1544, Alfonso wrote or translated letters to Pope Paul III and Cardinal Pierpaolo Parisio, appealing for protection against Grand Inquisitor Juan Pardo de Tavera's persecution of the university's Hebrew teachers. In these letters, Alfonso describes himself as the last to remain among those exiled by the Alhambra Decree, and says that he has had not one day of happiness in his (almost) seventy years of life.

== Works ==
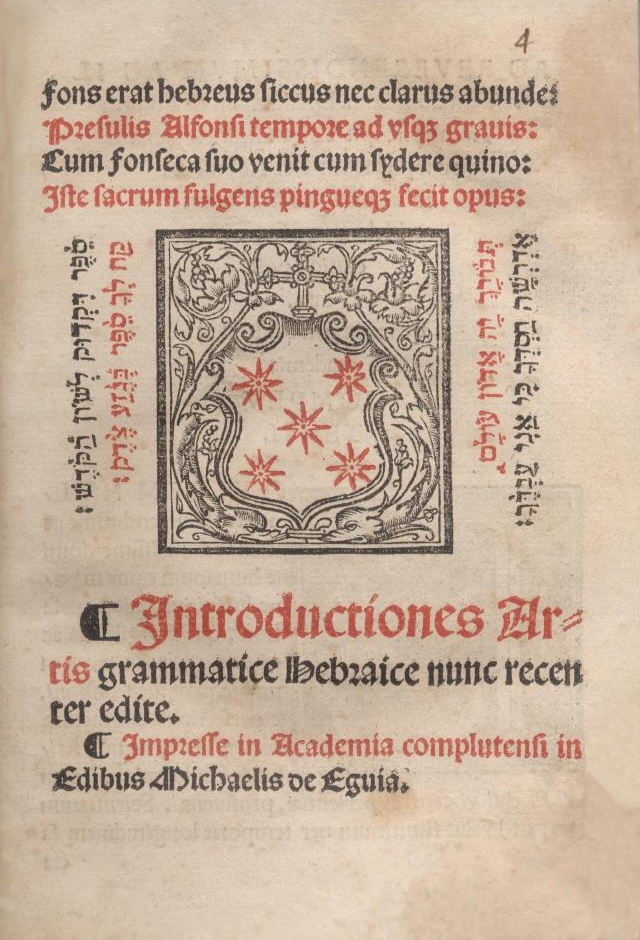
Introductionis artis Grammaticae hebraica (Alcalá de Henares, 1526).

=== Major works ===
Alfonso was a major contributor to the Complutensian Polyglot Bible, a project spearheaded by Cisneros. Alongside Alfonso de Alcalá and Pablo de Coronel, he revised the Hebrew text; he also translated the Targum Onkelos into Latin for the project, as well as prepared the dictionaries and study aids which form the sixth volume of the set. He wrote many essays among them "How to Overcome the Plague;" "Loor de Virtudes," on Jewish and Spanish Proverbs; how to respond to the Inquisition tribunals; forced polemics against Jews and Judaism (as pretense to safeguard his secret life); and poems mostly bemoaning his and the Jews' suffering.

In 1526, Alfonso published Introductiones Artis Grammaticæ Hebraicae, a second edition of a Hebrew grammar which he had originally contributed to the Polyglot Bible. Produced with editing help from Pedro Ciruelo, this work was published in Alcalá de Henares, and included an Epistle to the Hebrews (Latin: Introductiones Hebraicæ) urging the Jews of Rome and Spain to convert to Christianity. This seven-chapter letter offers arguments for Christianity, Jesus, and the Trinity based on the Old Testament. Adolf Neubauer, a Hebrew scholar, describes the arguments as standard for their day, Ho calls their interpretations of scripture "distorted" and "out of context", and historian Paul Rieger questions whether the Jews of Rome actually received the letter at all.

In his many prayers to the God of Israel, he affirmed his faith. He concluded many of his essays on faith with the statement that the only way to survive was to practice the Torah's commandments. In his essays, translations, and annotations, he cited primarily the Jewish commentators Rashi, Radaq, Ibn Ezra, Rambam, Ramban, Ralbag, HaMeiri, and Ba'al HaTurim (A. Ho, "Alfonso de Zamora, the Crypto-Jew," Iberia Judaica XIII (2021): 15-45).

=== Other translations and copies ===
Alfonso produced Aramaic, Latin and Spanish translations and annotated copies of at least 66 Hebrew works. These include:

- the Targum on Prophets, for Cisneros (1500) (Note: Anonymous, but likely by Alfonso.)
- Solomon ibn Gabirol's "On Poetry" (1516)
- "The Accents according to the Italian and Sephardic rites" (1516)
- the Masoret Seyag La-Torah (1516)
- David Kimhi's dictionary (1516)
- the Targum on the Hagiographa, for Cisneros (1517)
- Joseph Ibn Kaspi's grammar and dictionary (1519)
- Moses Kimhi's Mahalakh shevile ha-da'at (1519)
- the Masora parva and Megillat Antiochus (1520)
- the Book of Genesis, for Ciruelo (1520)
- David Kimhi's dictionary without niqqud (1526)
- the Book of Genesis (1527)
- David Kimhi's grammar, for Eduardo Leo, English ambassador to Emperor Charles V, at the suggestion of Pablo de Coronel (1527)
- the Books of Isaiah, Daniel, and Lamentations (1530)
- introduction to the Targum on Isaiah (1532)
- David Kimhi's commentary on Isaiah (1534) (Note: Begun by Ḥayyim ben Samuel ben David of Tudela, finished by Alfonso.)
- David Kimhi's dictionary (1534)
- the Targum Onkelos and Targum Pseudo-Jonathan (1534)
- the Pentateuch (1536)
- the Book of Exodus (1558)
- David Kimhi's Mikhlol (undated)
- David Kimhi's dictionary (undated)
- Compendium Alphonsi Zamorse Universorum Legis veteris praseeptorum (undated)

Many of these works include Hebrew colophons that asseverate his wide range of sponsors among high-ranking clergy, ambassadors (to Queen Joanna and Henry VIII), and University officials (Ho, 2021).
