= Lorenzo Valla =

Italian Renaissance humanist (c. 1407 – 1457)

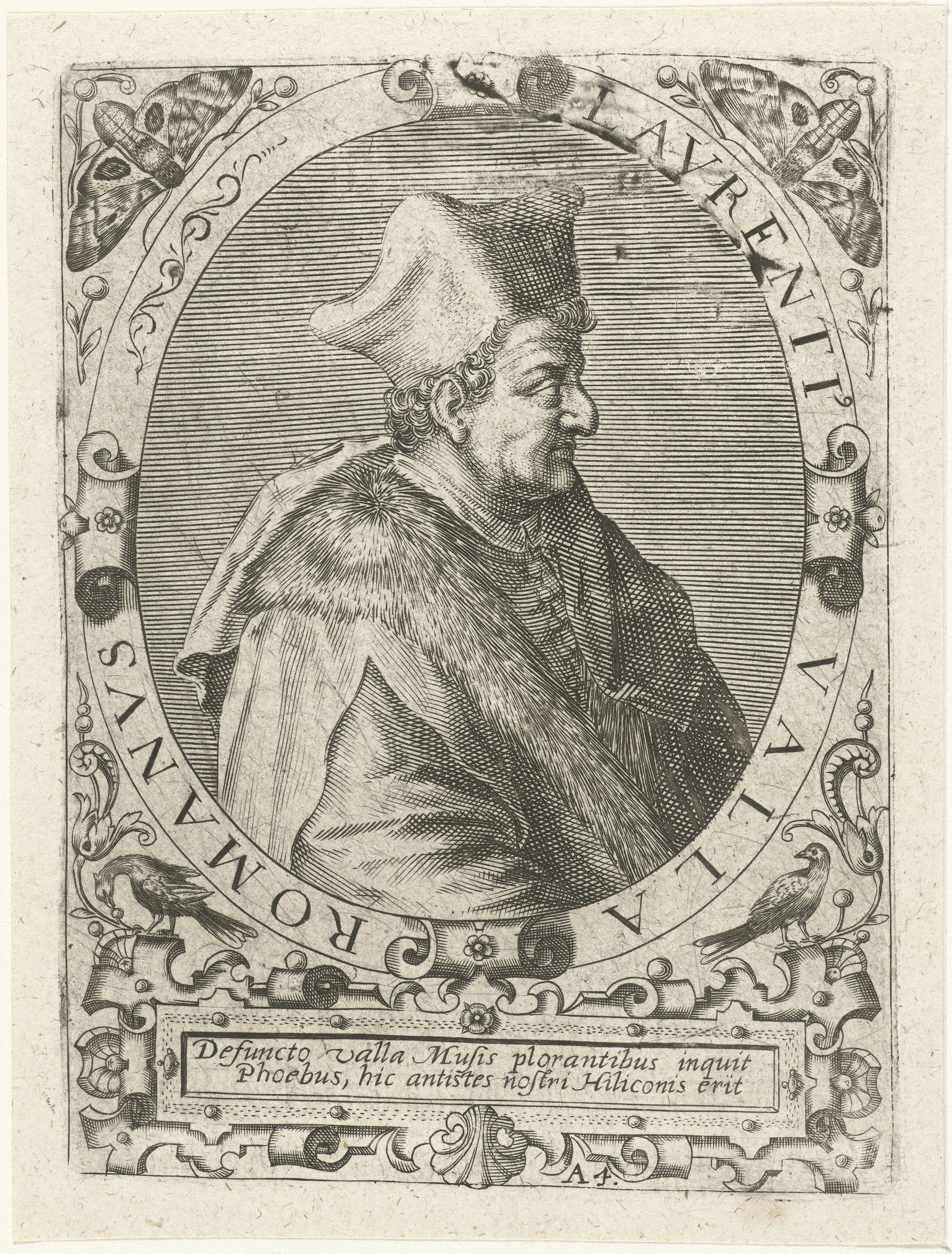
- Posthumous portrait by Theodor de Bry, c. 1597
- Born: c. 1407; Rome, Papal States
- Died: 1 August 1457 (aged 49–50); Rome, Papal States
- Other name: Laurentius Valla

Academic work
- Era: Renaissance philosophy
- School or tradition: Renaissance humanism
- Main interests: Philology; historical criticism; rhetoric; moral philosophy; free will; term logic

Lorenzo Valla (Italian: [loˈrɛntso ˈvalla]; also latinized as Laurentius; c. 1407 – 1 August 1457) was an Italian Renaissance humanist scholar, rhetorician, educator, and Catholic priest. He is best known for his historical-critical textual analysis that proved that the Donation of Constantine was a forgery, therefore impugning and undermining the presumption of temporal power claimed by the papacy. Lorenzo is sometimes seen as a precursor of the Reformation.

== Life ==
Valla was born in Rome, with a family background of Piacenza; his father, Luciave della Valla, was a lawyer who worked in the Papal Curia. He was educated in Rome, attending the classes of teachers including Leonardo Bruni and Giovanni Aurispa, from whom he learned Latin and Greek. He is thought otherwise to have been largely self-taught.

Bruni was a papal secretary; Melchior Scrivani, Valla's uncle, was another. But Valla had caused offence, to Antonio Loschi, by championing the rhetorician Quintilian in an early work. In 1431, Valla was ordained as a priest; the same year he tried in vain to secure a position as apostolic secretary to China. He was unsuccessful, despite his network of contacts.

Valla went to Piacenza, and then to Pavia, where he obtained a professorship of eloquence. His tenure at Pavia was made uncomfortable by his attack on the Latin style of the jurist Bartolus de Saxoferrato. He became itinerant, moving from one university to another, accepting short engagements and lecturing in many cities.

Invited to Rome by Pope Nicholas V in 1447, Valla worked there on his Repastinatio. He became a papal scribe and, in 1455, a papal secretary.

Valla died in Rome on 1 August 1457. He was originally buried beneath the monumental bronze Lex de imperio Vespasiani behind the altar of Saint John Lateran. His tomb and epitaph were last seen by Seyfried Rybisch in 1570. In 1576, Pope Gregory XIII, a staunch believer in the Donation of Constantine, had them destroyed when he removed the bronze to the Palazzo dei Conservatori. Today, there is a memorial to Valla in the Lateran.

== Reputation ==
Older biographies of Valla give details of many literary and theological disputes, the most prominent one with Gianfrancesco Poggio Bracciolini, which took place after his settlement in Rome. Extreme language was employed. He appears as quarrelsome, combining humanistic elegance with critical wit and venom, and an opponent of the temporal power of the Catholic Church.

Martin Luther had a high opinion of Valla and of his writings, and Robert Bellarmine called him "Luther's precursor". Erasmus stated in his De ratione studii that for Latin grammar, there was "no better guide than Lorenzo Valla".

The Danish rhetorician da:Christian Kock makes a case for the contemporary relevance of Valla's rhetorical theory. Kock highlights Valla's book, De voluptate for its Epicurean take on persuasion: not the stringent logic of the Medieval scholastics, but rather taking pleasure at the thought of the course which, according to the rhetor in question, should be taken, is what distinguishes rhetorical persuasion. In addition, Kock notes a similarity between Valla's thoughts on the common sense and practical rhetorical language with 20th century ordinary language philosophy.

== Works ==
=== On the Donation of Constantine ===
Between 1439 and 1440, Valla wrote the essay, De falso credita et ementita Constantini Donatione declamatio, which analyzed the document usually known as the Donation of Constantine. The Donation suggests that Constantine I gave the whole of the Western Roman Empire to the Roman Catholic Church. This was supposedly an act of gratitude for having been miraculously cured of leprosy by Pope Sylvester I.

From 1435 to 1445, Valla was employed in the court of Alfonso V of Aragon, who became involved in a territorial conflict with the Papal States, then under Pope Eugene IV. This relationship possibly motivated his work; in any case, he was put on trial before the Catholic Inquisition in 1444, but was protected from imprisonment by the intervention of Alfonso V.

Valla demonstrated that the internal evidence in the Donation told against a 4th-century origin: its vernacular style could be dated to the 8th century. Valla argued this thesis in three ways:

1. By stating that the Emperor Constantine could not have legally given Pope Sylvester the powers that the Donation claimed.
2. From the absence of contemporary evidence, Valla reasoned that it was implausible that a major change in the administration of the Western Roman Empire had taken place.
3. Valla doubted that Emperor Constantine had given Pope Sylvester anything at all, suggesting a mistake involving an earlier Pope.

Supplementing these points, Valla argued from anachronism: the document contained the word satrap, which he believed Romans such as Constantine I would not have used. In addition, Valla believed that the quality of Latin for such a supposedly important text was undeniably poor, evidencing this by the fact that the text constantly switched tenses from "we have proclaimed" to "we decree", for instance.

=== Textual criticism ===
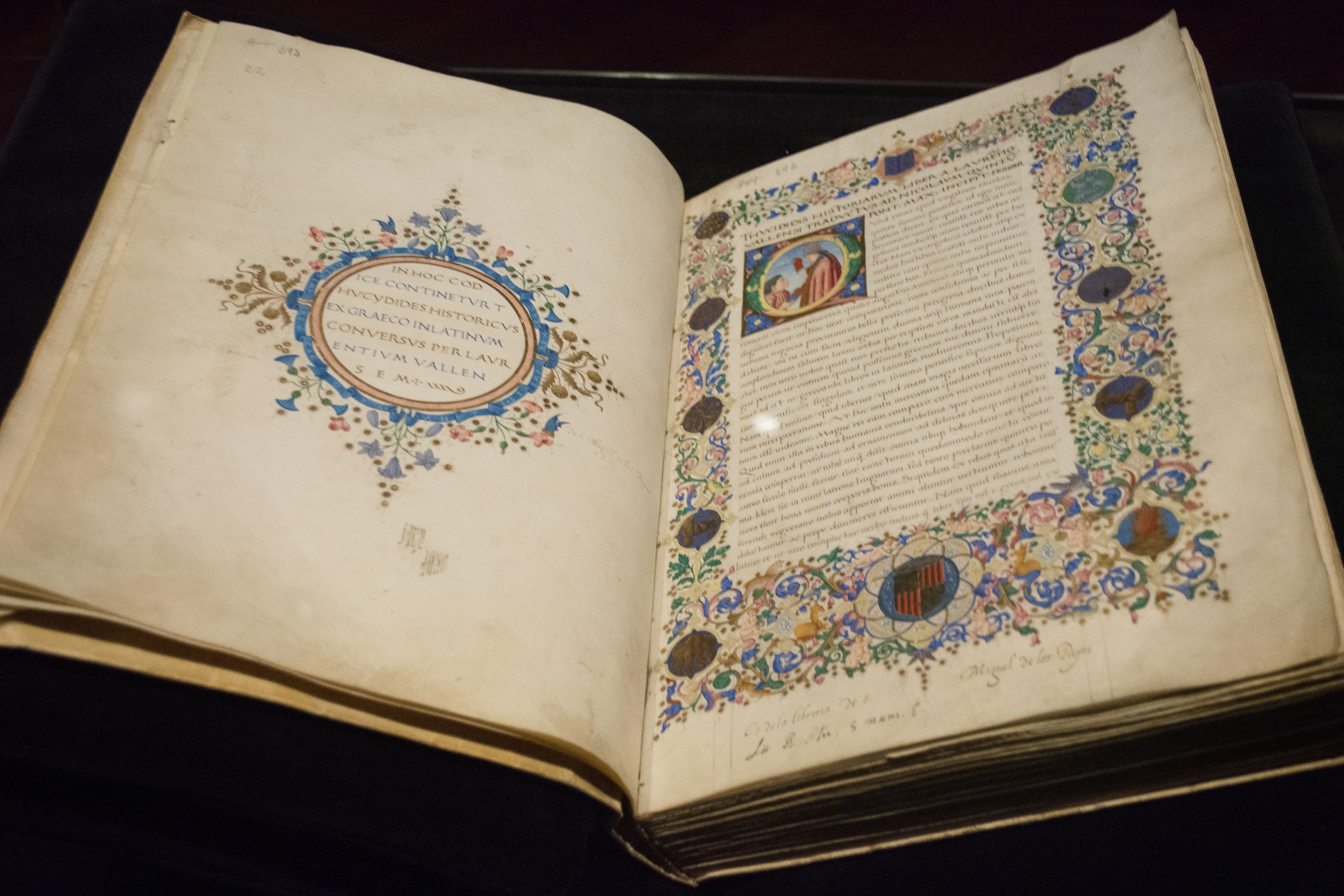
Valla's Latin edition of Thucydides

A specialist in Latin translation, Valla made numerous suggestions for improving on Petrarch's study of Livy. The emendation of Livy was also a topic discussed in book IV of his Antidotum in Facium, an invective against Bartolomeo Facio. In this part of the treatise, which also circulated independently under the title Emendationes in T. Livium, Valla elucidates numerous corrupt passages and criticises the attempts at emendation made by Panormita and Facio, his rivals at the court of Alfonso V.

In his critical study of the official Bible used by the Roman Catholic Church, Jerome's Latin Vulgate, Valla called into question the church's system of penance and indulgences. He argued that the practice of penance rested on Jerome's use of the Latin word paenitentia (penance) for the Greek metanoia, which he believed would have been more accurately translated as "repentance". Valla's work was praised by later critics of the Church's penance and indulgence system, including Erasmus.

=== Manuscript works ===
Valla made a contemporary reputation with two works: his dialogue De Voluptate and his treatise De Elegantiis Latinae Linguae. Richard Claverhouse Jebb said that his De Elegantiis "marked the highest level that had yet been reached in the critical study of Latin".

Initial date	Initial title	Scope	Versions, comments
1431	De Voluptate	"On Pleasure". In this work he contrasted the principles of the Stoics unfavourably with the tenets of Epicurus, showing sympathy for the natural appetites.	Version of 1433 as De vero bono (On the true good).
c. 1439	Repastinatio dialectice et philosophie	A logic text	A traditional title was Dialectica, or Dialecticae disputationes. Second version Reconcinnatio totius dialecticae et fundamentorum universalis philosophiae 1439 to 1448, printed in the Omnia Opera of 1540, third version Retractatio totius dialectice cum fundamentii universe philosophie, to 1457. He also concluded that Valla had reintroduced to the Latin West a type of argument that had fallen into disuse.
1440	De falso credita et ementita Constantini Donatione declamatio	On the Donation of Constantine.	In the Opera Omnia (Basle) as Contra Donationis, quae Constantini dicitur, privilegia, ut falso creditum declamatio. It was completely rejected by the Church. It was not formally published until 1517, became popular among Protestants, and an English translation was published for Thomas Cromwell in 1534.
c.1440	De libero arbitrio.	On Free Will	Contains an attack on book V of The Consolation of Philosophy.
1449	De Elegantiis	Valla subjected the forms of Latin grammar and the rules of Latin style and rhetoric to a critical examination.	It was controversial when it appeared, but its arguments carried the day, and humanistic Latin sought to purge itself of the post-Classical.
1452	Antidotum in Pogium	Controversy with Poggio Bracciolini	Bracciolini attacked Valla in Oratio in L. Vallam at the beginning of 1452.
An early work	Adnotationes in Novum Testamentum	Notes on the New Testament	Found by Erasmus in 1504, in Leuven, who published it in 1505. Collatio Novi Testamenti (1447). Revised in the 1450s.

=== Printed editions ===
Collected editions of Valla's works, not quite complete, were published at Basel in 1540 and at Venice in 1592, and Elegantiae linguae Latinae was reprinted nearly sixty times between 1471 and 1536.

- Opera omnia, Basel 1540; reprinted with a second volume (Turin: Bottega d'Erasmo, 1962).
- Repastinatio dialectice et philosophie, ed. G. Zippel, 2 vols. (First critical edition of the three versions: Padua: Antenore, 1982).
- Elegantiae linguae Latinae, Venice 1471, edited by S. López Moreda (Cáceres: Universidad de Extremadura, 1999).
- De vero falsoque bono, edited by M. de Panizza Lorch, Bari, 1970.
- Collatio Novi Testamenti, edited by A. Perosa (Florence: Sansoni, 1970).
- De falso credita et ementita Constantini donatione, ed. W. Setz (Weimar: Hermann Böhlaus Nachfolger, 1976; reprinted Leipzig: Teubner, 1994).
- Ars Grammatica, ed. P. Casciano with Italian translation (Milan: Mondadori, Fondazione Lorenzo Valla, 1990).
- On the Donation of Constantine. The I Tatti Renaissance Library (Cambridge, Massachusetts: Harvard University Press, 2007).
- Dialectical Disputations. The I Tatti Renaissance Library (Cambridge: Harvard University Press, London, 2012).
- Correspondence, ed. Cook, Brendan. The I Tatti Renaissance Library (Cambridge, Massachusetts: Harvard University Press, 2013).

=== English translations ===
- On the donation of Constantine translated by G. W. Bowersock, Cambridge, Massachusetts: Harvard University Press, 2008.
- Dialogue on Free Will, translated by C. Trinkaus. In: 'The Renaissance Philosophy of Man', edited by Ernst Cassirer et al., Chicago: University of Chicago Press, 1948.
- The profession of the religious and selections from The falsely-believed and forged donation of Constantine translated, and with an introduction and notes, by Olga Zorzi Pugliese, Toronto: Centre for Reformation and Renaissance Studies, 1998.
- De vero falsoque bono translated by A. K. Hieatt and M. Lorch, New York: Abaris Books 1977.
- In Praise of Saint Thomas Aquinas, translated by M. E. Hanley. In Renaissance Philosophy, ed. L. A. Kennedy, Mouton: The Hague, 1973.
- Dialectical Disputations, Latin text and English translation of the Repastinatio by B. P. Copenhaver and L. Nauta, Harvard University Press, 2012 (I Tatti Renaissance Library, two volumes).
