= On the Bondage of the Will =

Book by Martin Luther

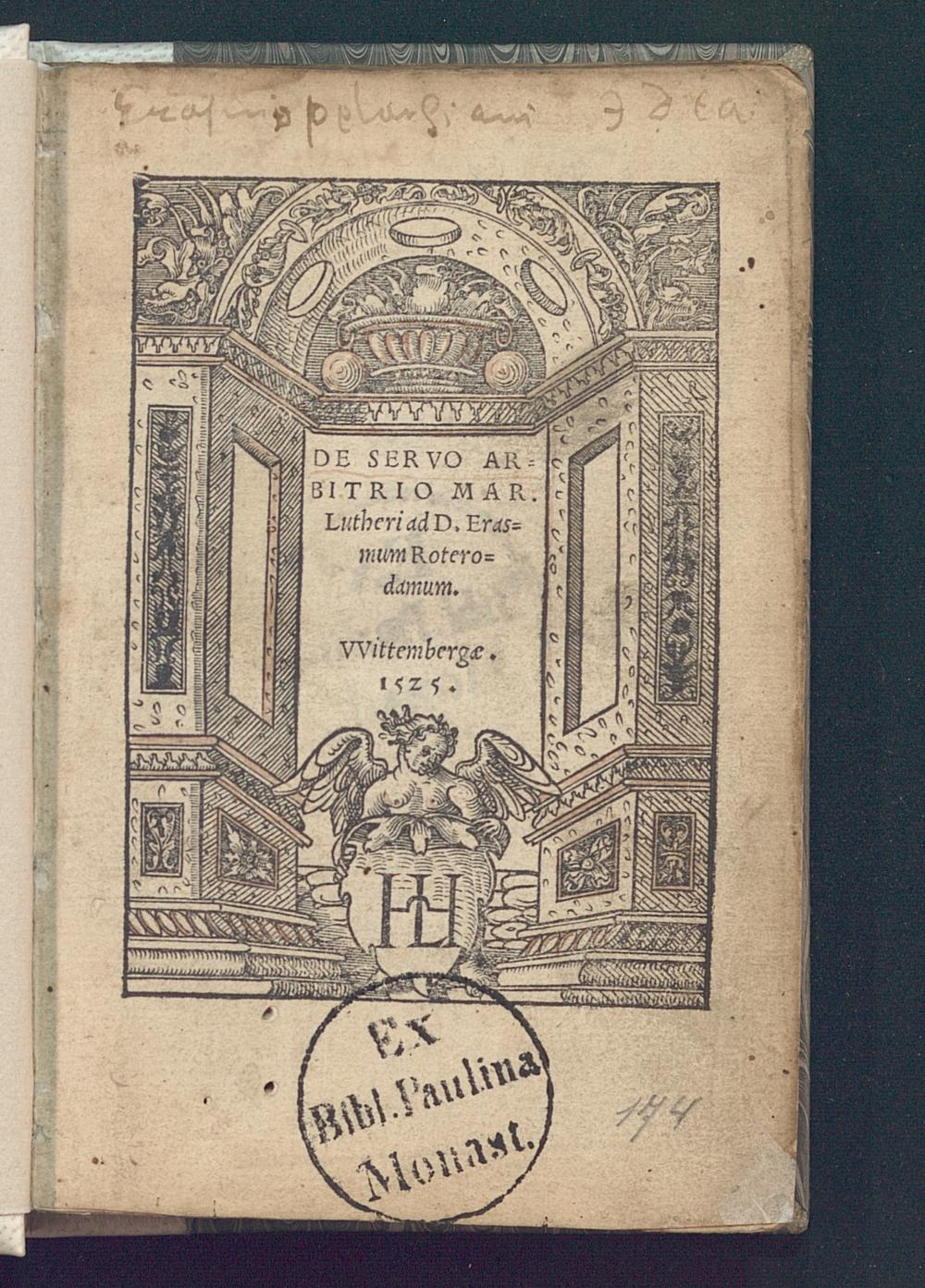
- Author: Martin Luther
- Original title: De Servo Arbitrio
- Translator: Henry Cole; first translation
- Language: Latin
- Genre: Philosophy, Theology
- Publication date: December 1525
- English publication date: 1823; first translation
- Preceded by: De Libero Arbitrio
- Followed by: Hyperaspistes

On the Bondage of the Will (Latin: De Servo Arbitrio, literally, "On Un-free Will", or "Concerning Bound Choice", or "The Enslaved Will") by Martin Luther argued that people can achieve salvation or redemption only through God, and could not choose between good and evil through their own willpower. It was published in December 1525. It was his reply to Desiderius Erasmus' De libero arbitrio diatribe sive collatio or On Free Will, which had appeared in September 1524 as Erasmus' first public attack on some of Luther's ideas.

The debate between Erasmus and Luther is one of the earliest of the Reformation over the issue of free will and predestination, between synergism and monergism, as well as on scriptural authority and human assertion.

== Erasmus' arguments ==
Despite his own criticisms of contemporary Roman Catholicism, Erasmus argued that it needed reformation from within and that Luther had gone too far. He held that all humans possessed free will and that the doctrine of predestination conflicted with the teachings and thrust of the Bible, which continually calls wayward humans to repent.

Erasmus argued against the belief that God's foreknowledge of events caused those events, and he held that the doctrines of repentance, baptism, and conversion depended on the existence of free will. He likewise contended that divine grace first called, led, and assisted humans in coming to the knowledge of God, and then supported them as they then used their free will to make choices between good and evil, and enabled them to act on their choices for repentance and good, which in turn could lead to salvation through the atonement of Jesus Christ (synergism).

His book also denied the authority Luther asserted for Luther's own opinions on matters where Scripture was, in Erasmus' view, unclear: in such situations we should, in public for unity, assent to any teaching of the church, or be non-dogmatic and tolerant otherwise. For Erasmus, one of Luther's flaws as a theologian was his exaggeration: he imposed meaning on passages that did not support it. (Note: "Furthermore, Luther’s exegetical method of taking a word from the Holy Scriptures and making it general in every aspect is disagreeable for Erasmus. For instance, Erasmus notes how Luther quotes from Isaias 40:68, 'All flesh is grass...' indicating that all human beings are incapable and fallen, which devalues the works of those who served God and his glory. Erasmus answers: 'If someone wants to contend that even the most distinguished human quality is nothing but flesh, i.e. a godless disposition, it would be easy to agree, except that he first proves this assertion from Scripture.'")

== Luther's response ==
A reading of the introduction to De Servo Arbitrio or On the Bondage of the Will in the original Latin, with English subtitles.

Luther's response was to claim that original sin incapacitates human beings from working out their own salvation, and that they are completely incapable of bringing themselves to God. As such, there is no free will for humanity, as far as salvation is concerned, because any will they might have is overwhelmed by the influence of sin.

If Satan rides, it [the will] goes where Satan wills. If God rides, it goes where God wills. In either case there is no 'free choice'.

— Martin Luther, On the Bondage of the Will

Luther concluded that unredeemed human beings are dominated by obstructions; Satan, as the prince of the mortal world, never lets go of what he considers his own unless he is overpowered by a stronger power, i.e. God. When God redeems a person, he redeems the entire person, including the will, which then is liberated to serve God.

No-one can achieve salvation or redemption through their own willpower—people do not choose between good or evil, because they are naturally dominated by evil, and salvation is simply the product of God unilaterally changing a person's heart and turning them to good ends. Were it not so, Luther contended, God would not be omnipotent and omniscient and would lack total sovereignty over creation.

He also held that arguing otherwise was insulting to the glory of God. As such, Luther concluded that Erasmus was not actually a Christian.

On the Bondage of the Will has been called "a brutally hostile book [...] accusing him [Erasmus] of being a hypocrite and an atheist." Several writers express concern that Luther went too far, in expression at least. For Protestant historian Philip Schaff "It is one of his most vigorous and profound books, full of grand ideas and shocking exaggerations, that border on Manichaeism and fatalism." "From beginning to end his work, for all its positive features, is a torrent of invective." Some historians have said that "the spread of Lutheranism was checked by Luther’s antagonizing (of) Erasmus and the humanists".

Judgements on whether Erasmus or Luther made the better case are usually divided on sectarian lines, and rarely examine Erasmus' follow-up Hyperaspistes. Philosopher John Smith claims "Despite the force of Luther's arguments, in many ways Erasmus carried the day by laying the foundation for historico-philological biblical criticism—and so Luther's warnings, as some religious figures and communities stress to this day, were all too accurate, since Erasmus's Humanism did set the ball rolling down a problematic slippery slope toward nonbelief."

== Erasmus' rebuttal ==
In early 1526, Erasmus replied to this work with the first part of his two-volume Hyperaspistes ("defender" or "shieldbearer"), followed 18 months later by the 570-page volume II: a very detailed work with a repetitive paragraph-by-paragraph rebuttal of On the Bondage of the Will. Luther did not answer Hyperaspistes, and it never gained widespread scholarly engagement or popular recognition, not even being translated into English for almost 500 years.

Erasmus satirized what he saw as Luther's method of repetitively asserting that tenuous scriptural phrases prove his position, by illustrating how he thought Luther would explain the Lord's Prayer; for example:

'Our Father.' Do you hear? Sons are under the authority of their fathers and not vice versa. There is thus no freedom of the will.
'Which art in heaven.' Listen: heaven works on what is below it, not vice versa. Thus our will does not act but is purely passive.
'Hallowed be thy name.' What can be clearer? If the will were free, the honor would belong to man and not to God.

— Erasmus, Hyperaspistes II

== Luther's later views on his writings ==
Luther was proud of his On the Bondage of the Will, so much so that in a letter to Wolfgang Capito written on 9 July 1537, he said:

Regarding [the plan] to collect my writings in volumes, I am quite cool and not at all eager about it because, roused by a Saturnian hunger, I would rather see them all devoured. For I acknowledge none of them to be really a book of mine, except perhaps the one On the Bound Will and the Catechism.

== English translations ==
- Luther, Martin; Cole, Henry (1823). Martin Luther on the Bondage of the Will: Written in Answer to the Diatribe of Erasmus on Free-will. London: Printed by T. Bensley for W. Simpkin and R . Marshall.
- Luther, Martin. The Bondage of the Will: A New Translation of De Servo Arbitrio (1525), Martin Luther's Reply to Erasmus of Rotterdam. J.I. Packer and O. R. Johnston, trans. Old Tappan, New Jersey: Fleming H. Revell Co., 1957.
- Erasmus, Desiderius and Martin Luther. Luther and Erasmus: Free Will and Salvation. The Library of Christian Classics: Ichthus Edition. Rupp, E. Gordon; Marlow, A.N.; Watson, Philip S.; and Drewery, B. trans. and eds. Philadelphia: Westminster Press, 1969. (This volume provides an English translation of both Erasmus' De Libero Arbitrio and Luther's De Servo Arbitrio.)
- Career of the Reformer III. Luther's Works, Vol. 33 of 55. Watson, Philip S. and Benjamin Drewery, trans. Philadelphia: Fortress Press, 1972.
