= Volker Leppin =

German church historian (born 1966)

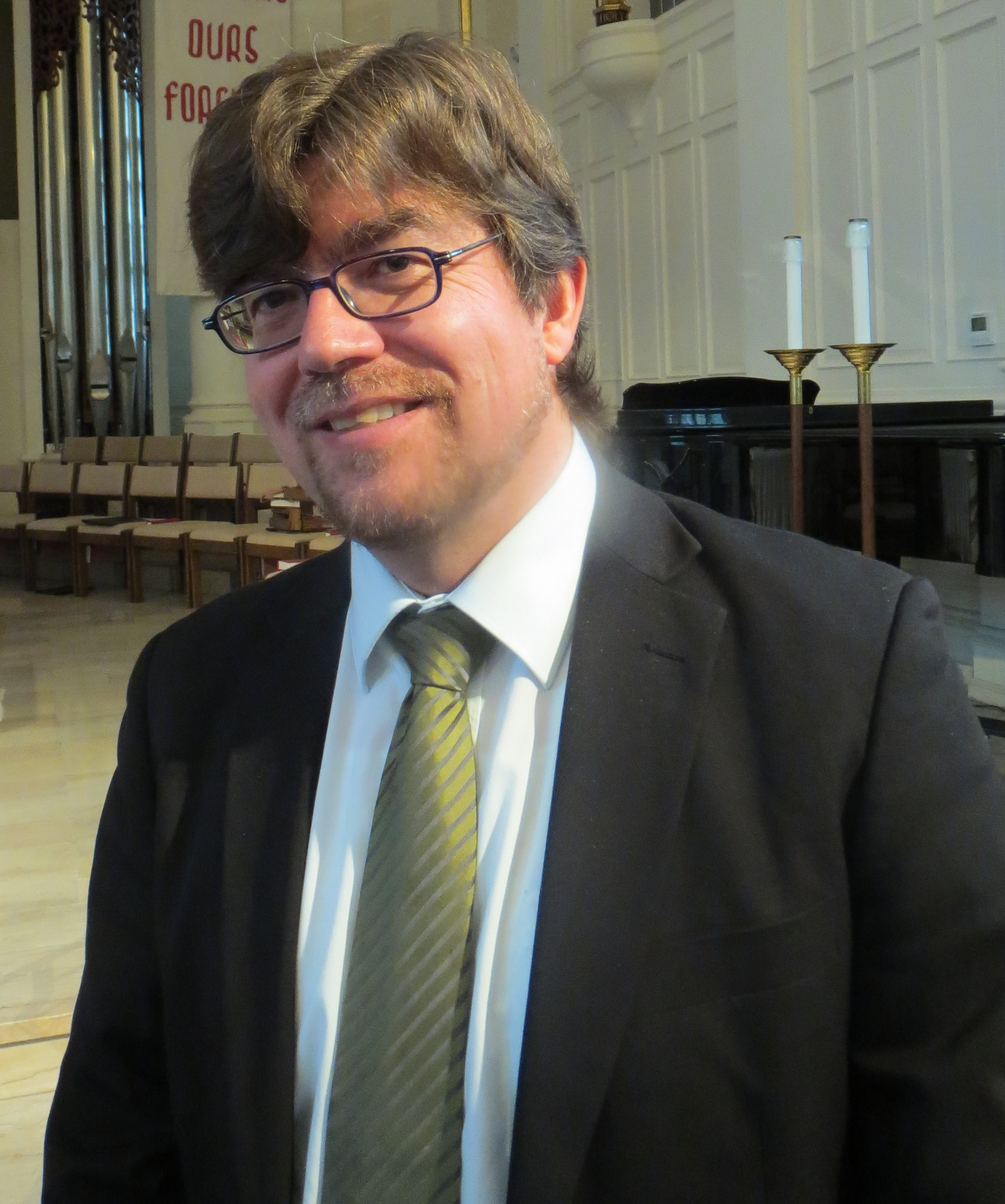
Leppin in 2013

Volker Leppin (born 1966) is a German church historian. He is the Horace Tracy Pitkin Professor of Historical Theology at Yale University.

Leppin grew up as the son of a pastor at St. Elizabeth's Church in Marburg, Germany. He studied theology at the University of Marburg, the Dormition Abbey in Jerusalem and Heidelberg University. In 1994, he completed his PhD at the University of Heidelberg with a doctoral thesis on William of Ockham. In 1997, he earned his habilitation with a study on Lutheran apocalypticism. Later, he taught at the University of Jena and the University of Tübingen.

He is well known for his interpretation of the Reformation as a transformation of the medieval world. His works cover a broad range of topics from Francis of Assisi to Martin Luther.

As a member of the Ökumenischer Arbeitskreis (Ecumenical Study Group of Protestant and Catholic Theologians), Leppin has written in favor of Eucharistic meal fellowship between Catholics and Protestants. He received an honorary doctorate from the University of Fribourg, Switzerland, in 2020 and a second honorary doctorate from the United Lutheran Seminary in 2026.
