= De libero arbitrio (Lorenzo Valla) =

C.1440 theological text

De libero arbitrio (sometimes translated "Dialogue on Free Will") is one in a series of dialogues written by Lorenzo Valla. The work discusses his views on the concept of free will as it pertains the Catholic Church's opinion on predestination at the time. The concept of predestination, in the opinion of the Catholic Church, deals with the fact that God knows how we will act and has predetermined our eternal destination. Many philosophers of the time argued that if humans' lives are in fact predetermined by God, than in reality the concept of free will is simply an illusion. Essentially the argument is that if God has created us already knowing the decisions we will make, than those decisions are not actually ours. Valla, through a fictional dialogue amongst the work's characters, defends the idea that the concepts of predetermination and free will can coexist. In the work, Valla states that he is attempting to directly refute the works of the 6th century philosopher Boethius.

== Background ==
Lorenzo Valla was an Italian humanist who lived during the 15th century. Valla was born in Rome in 1406. Valla's family had close ties to the papal curia, putting him in close contact with many established Church figures at an early age. Many of these figures were also thinkers who abided by humanist ideologies. One such humanist was Melchior Scrivani, who served as a papal secretary. Scrivani was also Valla's uncle. Lorenzo Valla hoped to one day succeed his uncle, and from early on in his career, he had a desire to leave his impact on the papacy and the Catholic Church. Valla faced criticisms from his peers within Rome which eventually forced him to leave for Pavia in 1431. Valla taught for three years in Pavia, eventually leaving to serve as a member of Alfonso of Aragon's court. Disputes between the Aragones and the papacy, in which Valla played a central role, left Valla with a renewed desire to leave his mark in Rome, even after the Aragonese settled their differences with the papacy.

== Valla as a humanist ==
As a humanist, Valla spent much of his early career writing on the importance of the Latin language to scholarly society. Renaissance humanism concentrates itself around the importance of Latin as the international language of scholars. Most Renaissance humanists, and Valla in particular, recognized and stressed the importance of rhetoric and language. Valla was known for his critiques of classical scholastic thought, and his ideas on the reformation of Aristotelian logic.

== Valla's dialogue on free will ==
As mentioned, Valla wrote his dialogue on free will (de libero arbitrio) with the intent of proving that the ideas of predetermination and free will could co-exist within the Catholic Church. Lorenzo Valla argued, not only in his dialogue on free will, that free will was essential to the make up of human morality. This belief is central to his theologies, and is one of the main reasons for his strong attempts to defend the concept.

Valla chronicles a fictional dialogue between two protagonists and through their conversation, expresses his own ideas on the issue. The first of the two main characters is Antonio Glarea, an educated man who Valla identifies as being from San Lorenzo. The second is a man named Lorenzo, and it is safe to assume that Lorenzo's comments throughout the dialogue are meant to represent those of Lorenzo Valla. The two engage in an intensely theoretical debate. Eventually, Valla's conclusions become evident to the reader. Many critics argue that although Valla argues his points passionately, many of his conclusions are inconclusive.

After a brief introduction by Valla, in which he outlines his reasons for writing the piece, he begins the dialogue with a statement by Antonio. The general point of Antonio's first statement is to express his utter confusion in regards to grasping the concept of free will. Antonio's initial comments are not as forceful as they become later in the dialogue. At this point in the work Antonio is simply expressing his frustrations with his inability to understand free will as the Church defines it.

Valla's character Lorenzo addresses Antonio's questions about free will by explaining that the free will of humans' lies in their decision to live good or bad lives morally. He argues that God has given each person certain characteristics, and that we are free to decide how we use those attributes. Lorenzo speaks about how the differences amongst our characteristics are things that God knows, and that we can not know about all of the things we don't have, and that we are best to just do all that we can to make the best of what we know we do have. The heart of Lorenzo's initial argument is that although God does know who we are and what we are going to do, we still have the ability to decide to live within God's grace and make the most of what we have.

Antonio and Lorenzo go on to agree on the terms of the concepts of free will and predestination. Both Antonio and Lorenzo consider themselves to be devout Roman Catholics. The two agree that in terms of the Catholic Church's view of predestination, that God does indeed know how we will act. The two also agree that the term free will can be defined as the ability for humans to make decisions about their actions. Antonio's main argument is that if God knows what we are going to do and he has created us, that God can not hold us accountable for our sins.

Lorenzo attempts to counter Antonio through numerous historical examples where he argues that God's foreknowledge of our action does not affect the morality of the decision at hand. He uses the example of the betrayal of Jesus by Judas. Initially Antonio claims that Lorenzo is simply bringing him back to his initial confusion on the issue of free will. After further discussion however Antonio admits that Lorenzo's arguments have persuaded him to recognize the compatibility of predestination and free will.

== Criticisms ==
Many critics of Valla argue that although he makes strong arguments, he bases many of them on the inability of humans to grasp God's ability to know everything. Many of Valla's arguments demand the human concession that many aspects of God and faith are never going to be able to be understood. Oftentimes Valla resorts to making the claim that many of the counterarguments he is presented with are in fact heretical.
