= Erasmus Bible =

Erasmus Bible may refer to:

- Novum Instrumentum omne, an edition of the New Testament by Erasmus
  - Textus Receptus, all editions of the Novum Instrumentum omne
