= Listed buildings in Hackforth =

Hackforth is a civil parish in the county of North Yorkshire, England. It contains four listed buildings that are recorded in the National Heritage List for England. All the listed buildings are designated at Grade II, the lowest of the three grades, which is applied to "buildings of national importance and special interest". The parish contains the village of Hackforth and the surrounding countryside, and the listed buildings consist of three farmhouses and a public house.

== Buildings ==
Name and location	Photograph	Date	Notes
Gyll Hall; 54.34853°N 1.62827°W	—	Early 17th century	A farmhouse in rendered stone, with stone dressings, quoins, a moulded string course, and a pantile roof with stone coping. There are two storeys and attics, and four bays, the outer bays projecting and gabled, and the rear is a gabled stair tower. The windows are chamfered and mullioned, most with hood moulds.
Manor House Farmhouse; 54.33549°N 1.62343°W	—	Early 17th century	The farmhouse is in stone with quoins and a pantile roof. There are two storeys and five bays. On the front is a gabled porch, and a doorway with a chamfered surround and a hood mould. The windows are sashes in chamfered surrounds with hood moulds, most horizontally-sliding.
Round Hill Farmhouse; 54.33301°N 1.63695°W	—	1767	The farmhouse is in rendered stone, with stone dressings, a floor band, an eaves band, and a hipped Welsh slate roof. There are two storeys and three bays, the middle bay projecting under a moulded pediment. In the right return of this bay is a doorway with an architrave, a fanlight and a cornice, and on the front is a full-height round-headed recess containing a tripartite sash window. To the left is a sash window, and to the right is a French window in a moulded architrave. The upper floor contains sash windows, the middle one with a segmental head, and to the left is a horizontally-sliding sash.
The Greyhound Inn; 54.33341°N 1.62828°W		Early 19th century	The public house is rendered, with stone dressings and a hipped pantile roof with two courses of stone slates. There are two storeys, a front of two bays, three bays on the returns, and a lower recessed wing on the left. The doorway is recessed, and has a moulded architrave, a fanlight and a cornice, and the windows are sashes.
