= James Stonnes =

James Stonnes (b. 1513; d. after 1585) was an English Catholic priest, active in northern England.

== Life ==
He was ordained at Durham by Bishop Tunstall in 1539. After Elizabeth I's accession he never entered a church, but wandered about Durham and Yorkshire, with occasional visits to Lancashire. He was known as Uncle James, saying Mass as often as the opportunity of time, place, and company gave leave.

He was eventually arrested by the Earl of Derby about midnight 19 November 1585, at the house of a very poor man, eight miles from the earl's seat, Newpark, in the Parish of Ormskirk, Lancashire. As he would not commit himself to the royal supremacy, though he acknowledged the queen as temporal sovereign, and as he confessed that he regarded her ecclesiastical policy as contrary to God's law and refused to give up saying Mass, he was committed to the New Fleet, Manchester. There, as he was then aged 72, it is probable he died.
