= De arte supputandi =

Book by Cuthbert Tunstall published in 1522

De arte supputandi libri quattuor
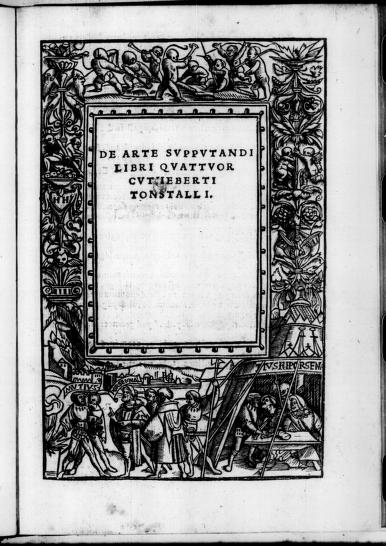
- Title page of the 1522 edition
- Author: Cuthbert Tunstall
- Language: Latin
- Subject: Mathematics
- Published: 1522
- Publication place: England

De arte supputandi libri quattuor was the first printed work on arithmetic published in England. Published in 1522, it was written by Cuthbert Tunstall, Bishop of London, and based on Luca Pacioli's Summa de arithmetica, geometria, proportioni et proportionalità. It is dedicated to Sir Thomas More.
