= Cuthbert Tunstall =

English bishop and diplomat (1474–1559)

The Right Reverend Cuthbert Tunstall Confessor-Bishop
- Bishop of Durham
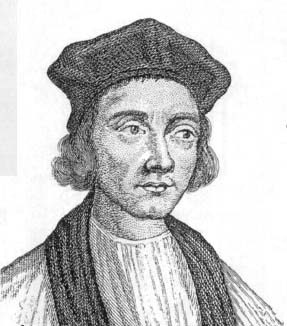
- Church: Roman Catholic
- Diocese: Diocese of Durham
- Elected: 1530; 1556
- Term ended: 1552; 1559 (twice deprived)
- Predecessor: Cardinal Thomas Wolsey
- Successor: James Pilkington
- Other posts: Bishop of London; 1522–1530

Orders
- Consecration: 19 October 1522 by William Warham

Personal details
- Born: 1474 Hackforth, Yorkshire, England
- Died: 18 November 1559
- Parents: Thomas Tunstall
- Education: University of Oxford

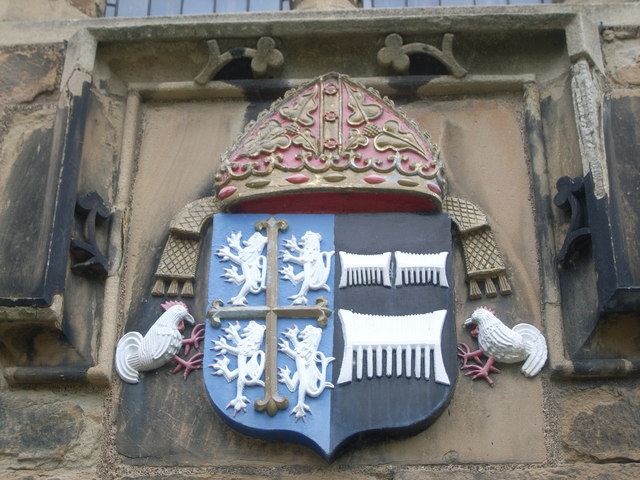
Arms of Bishop Cuthbert Tunstall, Durham Castle. See of Durham impaling Tunstall (Sable, three combs argent), "which arose from the first of the name and family in England, being barber to William the Conqueror"

Cuthbert Tunstall (otherwise spelt Tunstal or Tonstall; 1474 – 18 November 1559) was an English humanist, bishop, diplomat, administrator and royal adviser. He served as Bishop of Durham during the reigns of Henry VIII, Edward VI, Mary I, and Elizabeth I. He has been described as having "invincible" or "burning moderation" on Erasmian Catholic lines.

== Childhood and early career ==
Cuthbert Tunstall was born in Hackforth near Bedale in North Yorkshire in 1474, illegitimate son of Sir Thomas Tunstall of Thurland Castle in Lancashire, who was later an esquire of the body of Richard III. His half-brother, Sir Brian Tunstall, the so-called "stainless knight," was killed at the Battle of Flodden in 1513. Sir Walter Scott mentions "stainless Tunstall's banner white" in Canto Six, line 790 of Marmion.

Little is known of Tunstall's early life, except that he spent two years as a kitchen boy in the household of Sir Thomas Holland, perhaps at Lynn, Norfolk. He was admitted to Balliol College, Oxford around 1491, where he studied mathematics, theology, and law. Around 1496, he became a scholar of the King's Hall, Cambridge. He did not receive a degree from either Oxford or Cambridge; he graduated from the University of Padua in 1505 as a Doctor of Civil Law and a Doctor of Canon Law. At Padua, he studied under some of the leading humanists and became proficient in Greek and Hebrew.

William Warham, Archbishop of Canterbury, made Tunstall his chancellor on 25 August 1511, and shortly afterward he appointed him rector of Harrow on the Hill. He became a canon of Lincoln in 1514, and archdeacon of Chester in 1515. Soon thereafter, he was employed on diplomatic business by King Henry VIII and Cardinal Wolsey. In 1515, Tunstall was sent to Flanders with Sir Thomas More, a friend since his school days, which More mentions in a glowing tribute in the opening paragraph of Utopia. At Brussels, he met Erasmus as well, becoming the intimate friend of both scholars and Peter Gilles, becoming the godfather to Gilles' daughter. He helped Erasmus make corrections to the second edition of his New Testament. In 1519, he was sent to Cologne; a visit to Worms (1520–21) gave him a sense of the threatening significance held by the Lutheran movement. (Note: In Worms he was an early reader of Luther's On the Babylonian Captivity of the Church, writing: "They say there is much more strange opinions in it near to the opinions of Bohemia (Hussites). I pray God keep that book out of England." 1. ‘Quae pestis unquam tam perniciosa invasit gregem christi?’: The Role of the Book in the Reception of Lutheranism in England)

Tunstall was made Master of the Rolls in 1516 and Dean of Salisbury in 1521. He remotely assisted his friend Erasmus in the preparation of his second edition of the New Testament. In 1522, he published the first book of mathematics printed in England, based on the Italian Luca Pacioli. In 1522, he became Bishop of London by papal provision, and on 25 May 1523, he was made Lord Keeper of the Privy Seal. In 1525, he negotiated with the Holy Roman Emperor Charles V after the Battle of Pavia, and he helped to arrange the Peace of Cambrai in 1529.

== Protestantism ==
Tunstall met William Tyndale in 1523 seeking patronage to translate the Bible (into contemporaneous Early Modern English) which Tunstall declined, saying he already funded several scholars. Tunstall, who preferred burning heretical books to heretics, later presided over the buying up and burning of almost all copies of the first edition of Tyndale's New Testament at Paul's Cross in October 1526. According to some scholars this helped fund Tyndale's subsequent improved edition, as his friend Thomas More had warned. He granted More a license to read, and respond to, heretical books.

== Bishop of Durham under Henry VIII and Edward VI ==
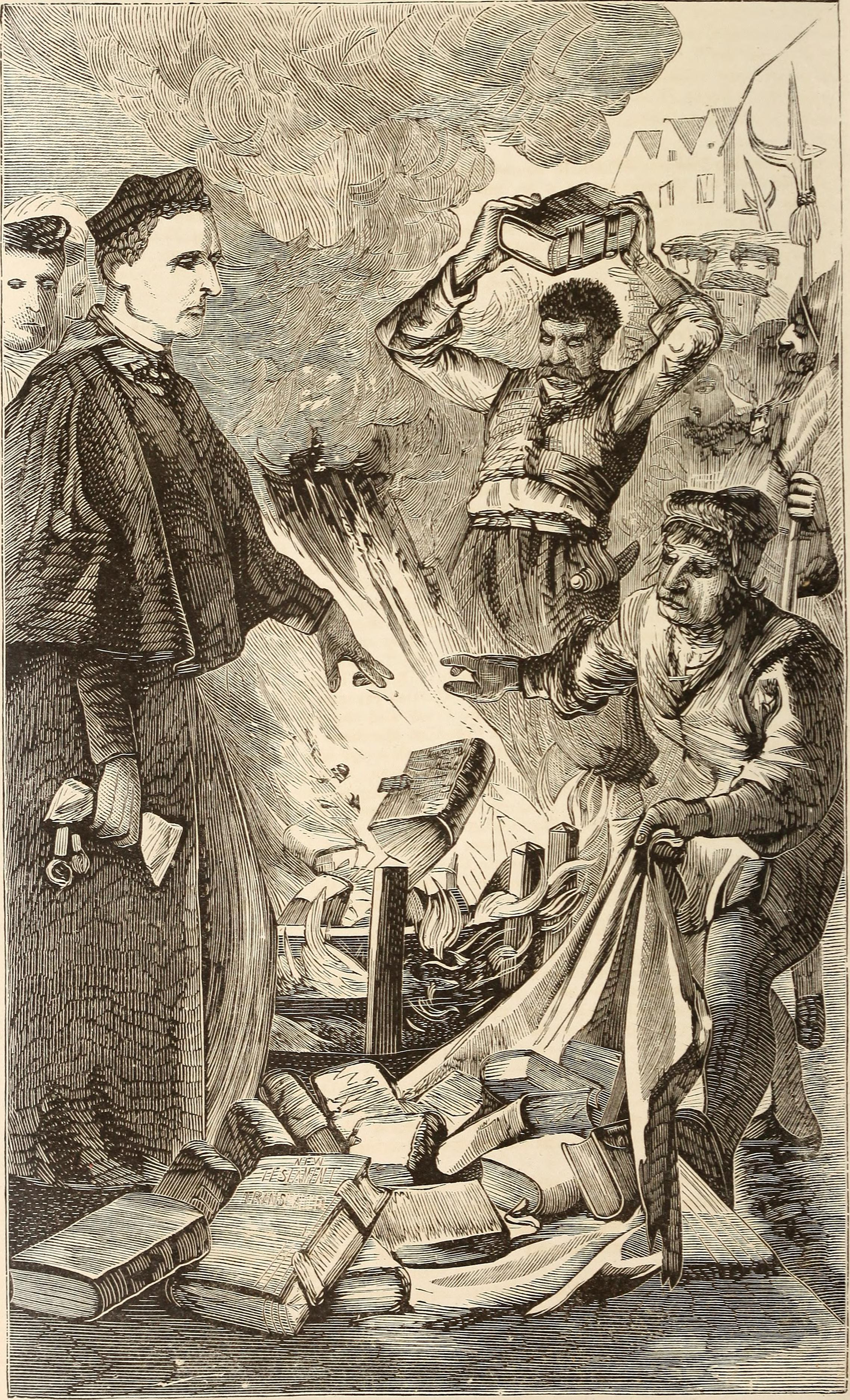
Bishop Tunstall burning a translation of the Bible in London, 1870 illustration

On 22 February 1530, again by papal provision, Tunstall succeeded Cardinal Wolsey as Bishop of Durham. This role involved the assumption of quasi-regal power and authority within the territory of the diocese, the County Palatine of Durham. In 1537, he was made President of the new Council of the North. Although he was often engaged in time-consuming negotiations with the Scots, he took part in other public business and attended parliament where, in 1539, he participated in the discussion on the Bill of Six Articles.

In the question of King Henry's divorce, Tunstall acted as one of Queen Catherine's counselors. Unlike Bishop John Fisher and Sir Thomas More, Tunstall adopted a policy of passive obedience and acquiescence regarding many matters for which he likely held little support during the troubled years following the English Reformation. While Tunstall adhered firmly to Roman Catholic doctrine and practices, after some hesitation he accepted Henry as head of the Church of England, and he publicly defended this position, accepting a schism with Rome.

Tunstall disliked the religious policy pursued by the advisers of King Edward VI and voted against the first Act of Uniformity in 1549. However, he continued to discharge his public duties without interruption and hoped in vain that the Earl of Warwick might be convinced to reverse the anti-Catholic policy of the Duke of Somerset. After Somerset's fall, Tunstall was summoned to London in May 1551 and confined to his house there. During this captivity, he composed a treatise on the Eucharist, which was published in Paris in 1554. At the end of 1551 he was imprisoned in the Tower of London, and a bill for his deprivation was introduced into the House of Commons. When this failed, he was tried by a commission on 4–5 October 1552 and deprived of his bishopric.

== Bishop of Durham under Mary I and Elizabeth I ==
On the accession of the Catholic Queen Mary I to the throne in 1553, Tunstall was granted liberty. His bishopric, which had been dissolved by Act of Parliament in March 1553, was re-established by a further Act in April 1554. Tunstall assumed his office as Bishop of Durham once more. He maintained his earlier conciliatory approach, indulging in no systematic persecution of Protestants. Through Mary's reign he ruled his diocese in peace.

When the Protestant Elizabeth I ascended to the throne, Tunstall refused to take the Oath of Supremacy and would not participate in the consecration of the Anglican Matthew Parker as Archbishop of Canterbury. He was arrested, deprived again of his diocese in September 1559, and confined in comfort at Lambeth Palace, where he died within a few weeks, aged 85. He was one of eleven Roman Catholic bishops to die in custody during Elizabeth's reign.

He was buried in the parish church of St Mary-at-Lambeth, now a deconsecrated building.

The Anglican historian Albert F. Pollard wrote:

Tunstall's long career of eighty-five years, for thirty-seven of which he was a bishop, is one of the most consistent and honourable in the sixteenth century. The extent of the religious revolution under Edward VI caused him to reverse his views on the royal supremacy and he refused to change them again under Elizabeth.

== Works ==
- De arte supputandi libri quattuor (1522)

Based on the Summa of Luca Pacioli, this was the first printed work published in England that was devoted exclusively to mathematics.

- Confutatio cavillationum quibus SS. Eucharistiae Sacramentum ab impiis Caphernaitis impeti solet (Paris, 1552)
- De veritate corporis et sanguinis domini nostri Jesu Christi in eucharistia (Paris, 1554)
- Compendium in decem libros ethicorum Aristotelis (Paris, 1554)
- Certaine godly and devout prayers made in Latin by C. Tunstall and translated into Englishe by Thomas Paynelle, Clerke (London, 1558).
- Tunstall's correspondence as president of the Council of the North is in the British Library.

== See also ==
- James Stonnes (b. 1513; d. after 1585) Catholic priest, ordained by Tunstall in 1539

== Notes ==
Catholic Church titles
Preceded by Richard Fitz-James	Bishop of London; 1522–1530	Succeeded by John Stokesley
Church of England titles
Preceded by Cardinal Thomas Wolsey	Bishop of Durham; 1530–1552; 1553–1558	Succeeded by James Pilkington
Political offices
Preceded by The Lord Marney	Lord Privy Seal; 1523–1530	Succeeded by The Earl of Wiltshire
