= Hackforth =

Village and civil parish in North Yorkshire, England

Coordinates: 54.33644°N 1.62666°W

- Location within North Yorkshire
- Population: 169 (2011 census)
- OS grid reference: SE243934
- Unitary authority: North Yorkshire
- Ceremonial county: North Yorkshire
- Region: Yorkshire and the Humber
- Country: England
- Sovereign state: United Kingdom
- Post town: Bedale
- Postcode district: DL8
- Police: North Yorkshire
- Fire: North Yorkshire
- Ambulance: Yorkshire
- UK Parliament: Thirsk and Malton

Hackforth is a small village and civil parish in the county of North Yorkshire, England, about 4 miles (6 km) north of Bedale. Nearby settlements include Langthorne and Crakehall.

== History ==
Hackforth was mentioned in Domesday Book in 1086 as being in the hundred of "Land of Count Alan" and the county of Yorkshire and the population was estimated at 6 households.

In 1870-72 John Marius Wilson's Imperial Gazetteer of England and Wales described Tunstall as:

"a township in Hornby parish, N. R. Yorkshire; 4¼ miles NNW of Bedale. Acres, 1, 264. Real property, £1, 957. Pop., 1 67. Houses, 28. The property belongs to the Duke of Leeds. Bishop Tunstall was a native."

As mentioned in the gazetteer, Hackforth was the birthplace of Cuthbert Tunstall, who served as the Prince-Bishop of Durham on two occasions between 1530 and 1559, during the reigns of Henry VIII, Edward VI, Mary I, and Elizabeth I.

== Governance ==
Until 2023, Hackforth was part of the Richmond (Yorks) parliamentary constituency. It was removed and added to the expanded Thirsk and Malton Constituency, in part due to areas from that constituency being created into a new seat of Wetherby and Easingwold. From 1974 to 2023 it was part of the Hambleton District, it is now administered by the unitary North Yorkshire Council.

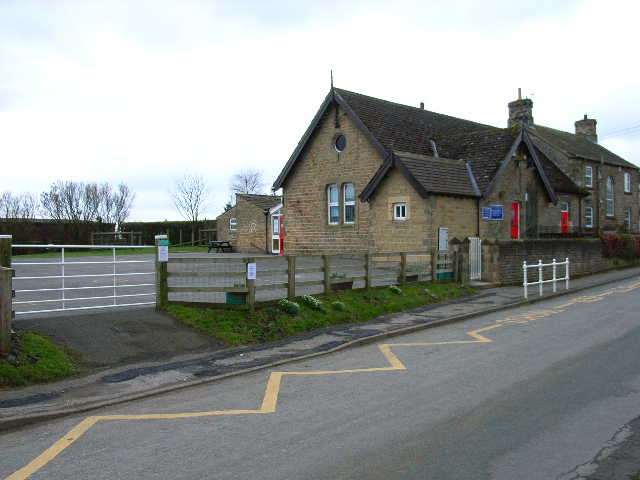
Hackforth and Hornby Church of England Primary School

== Community and culture ==
The village is served by a primary school, Hackforth and Hornby CofE, with a capacity for 42 pupils. Hackforth has a public house, The Greyhound, and a village hall built in 1936 which has also been used as a live music venue since 2013, hosting acts such as The Dunwells.

== See also ==
- Listed buildings in Hackforth
