= Paulus Bombasius =

Vatican prefect

Letter by Bombasius to Erasmus (1511)

Paulus Bombasius, or Paolo Bombace (1476–1527) was a prefect of the Vatican Library.

He was born in Bologne in a noble family. In 1502 he delivered an oration to Louis XII in the name of the Senate of Bologna. From 1505 to 1512 he was public reader in Rhetoric and Poetry. In 1513 Bombasius went to Naples, and then to Rome. In Rome he became secretary to Cardinal Antonio Pucci. In 1518 he was made Chevalier of St. Peter.

Bombasius was in regular correspondence with Desiderius Erasmus. After Erasmus published his Novum Instrumentum omne (1516), Bombasius criticised it because the Greek text departed from the common readings of the Vulgate. He informed Erasmus that the Vatican Library held an ancient copy of the Scriptures (i.e. Codex Vaticanus). He sent two extracts from this manuscript containing 1 John 4:1-3 and 1 John 5:7-11 (it did not include Comma Johanneum).

Unpublished letters of Bombasius are in the Vatican Library.

== See also ==
- Juan Ginés de Sepúlveda
