= Novum Instrumentum omne =

First published New Testament in Greek

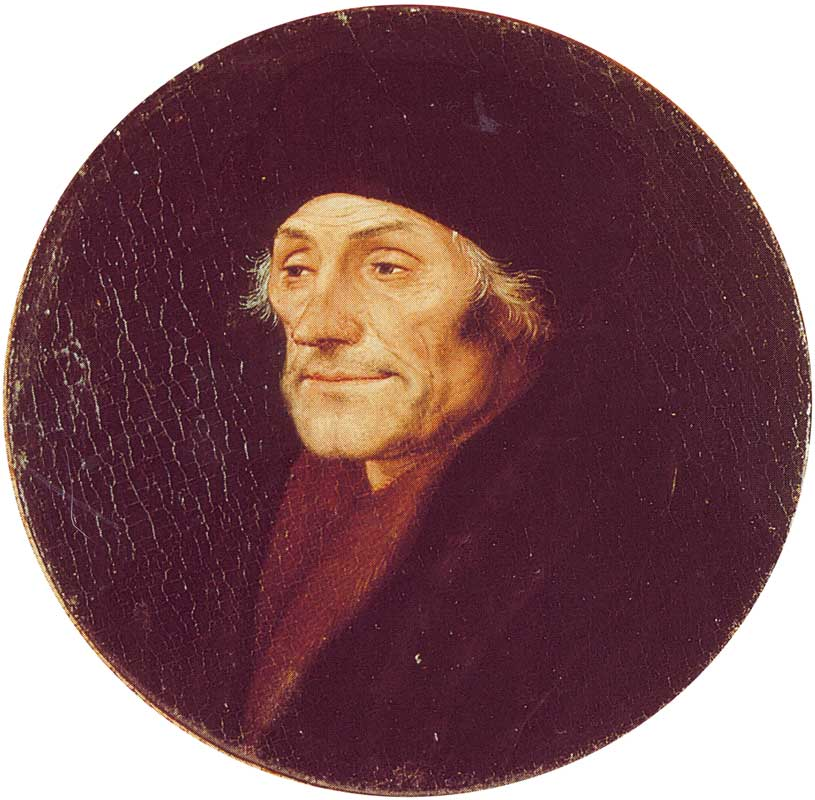
Erasmus

Novum Instrumentum Omne, later titled Novum Testamentum Omne, was a series of bilingual Latin-Greek New Testaments with substantial scholarly annotations, and the first printed New Testament of the Greek to be published. They were prepared by Desiderius Erasmus (1466–1536) in consultation with leading scholars, and printed by Johann Froben (1460–1527) of Basel. All five editions included Erasmus' collated and corrected Vulgate Latin version side-by-side with the Greek version, and the fourth edition also included his de novo rendition of the Greek into more refined Latin to bring out the similarities and difference from the Vulgate, for scholars not expert in Greek.

An estimate of up to 300,000 copies were printed in Erasmus' lifetime. After Erasmus' death, his New Testament work was republished and revised notably by Robert Stephanus: the corrected Latin Vulgate, shorn of mentions of Erasmus, soon became a reference text for the Leuven Vulgate which was ultimately the basis of the official Catholic Sixto-Clementine Vulgate Bible and subsequent Catholic vernacular translations; the Greek text was the basis for the majority of Protestant Textus Receptus translations of the New Testament in the 16th–19th centuries, including those of Martin Luther, William Tyndale and the King James Version.

== Contemporary efforts ==
By the early 16th century, the advent of the printing press and the new mass market for printed books had fundamentally changed the practicalities and usefulness of scholarly publishing, new editions and new translations.

Giannozzo Manetti translated the New Testament from the Greek, and the Psalms from the Hebrew, at the court of Pope Nicholas V, around 1455. The manuscripts still exist, but Manetti's version was not printed until 2014. Greek fragments began to be printed as Greek fonts were cut: the Aldine Press published the first six chapters of John's Gospel in 1505.

The early 1500s saw several authorized efforts to create and print scholarly polyglot and Greek editions of Bible texts:

- In 1512, French priest Jacques Lefèvre d'Étaples published his revised version of the Vulgate's epistles of St Paul, corrected against Greek texts, as well as a four-translation edition of the Psalms, sponsored by Cardinal Briçonnet.

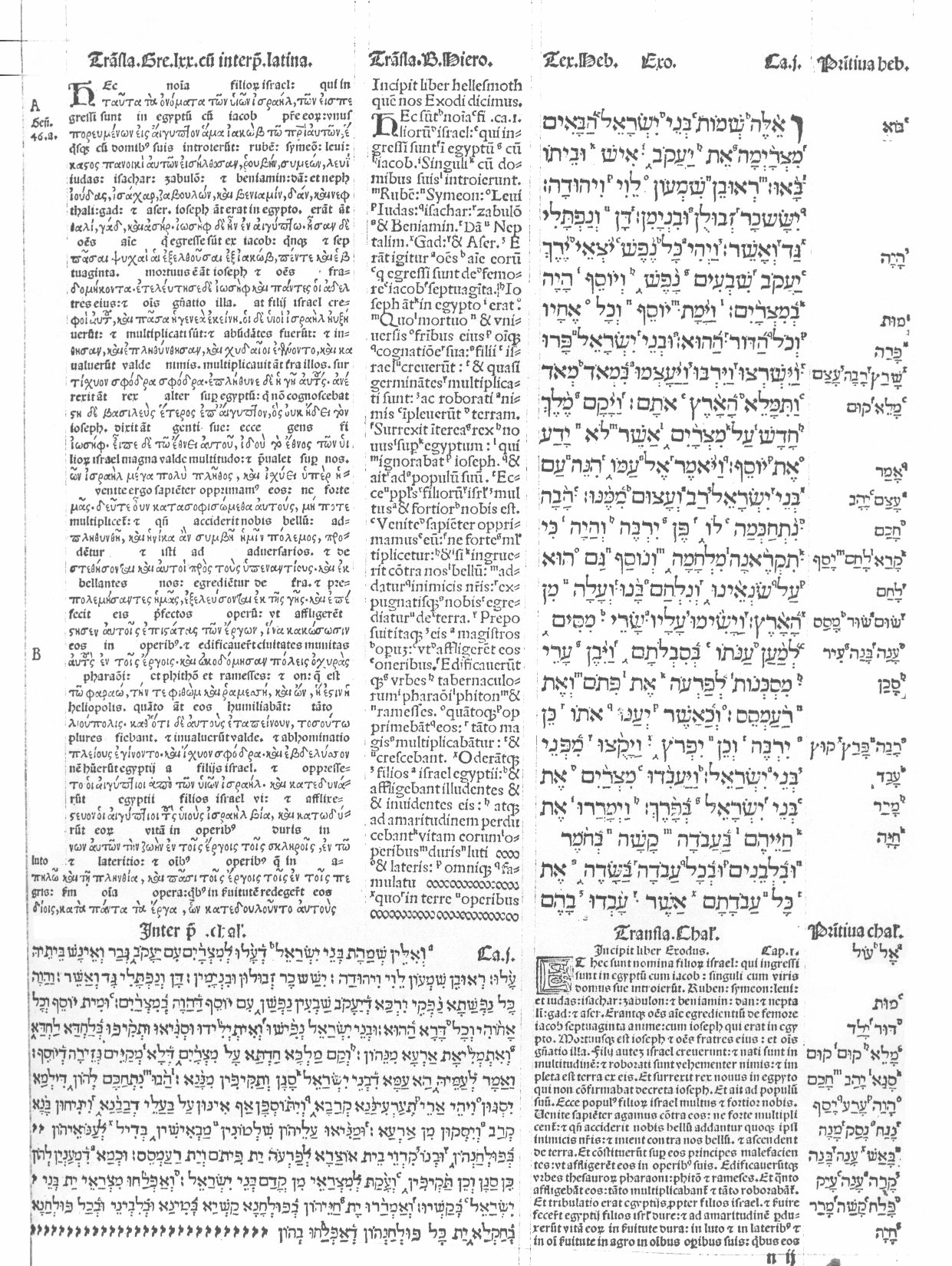
Leaf of Complutensian Polyglot Bible showing the start of Exodus, recto page. Upper part: Greek LXX with Latin interlinear; Latin Vulgate; Hebrew; Hebrew roots in margin. Lower part: Aramaic; Latin translation of Aramaic; Aramaic roots in margin.

- In 1502 in Spain, Cardinal Francisco Jiménez de Cisneros put together a team of Spanish translators to create a compilation of the Bible in four languages: Greek, Hebrew, Aramaic, and Latin. Translators from Greek were commissioned from Greece itself and worked closely with Latinists. Cardinal Cisneros's team completed and printed the full New Testament, including the Greek version, in 1514. To do so they developed specific types to print Greek. Cisneros informed Erasmus of the work going on in Spain and may have sent a printed version of the New Testament to him; he invited Erasmus to participate. Although the first printed Greek New Testament was the Complutensian Polyglot (1514), Erasmus' was published first (1516). The Complutensian Polyglot edition was approved for publication by the Pope in 1520; however, it was not released until 1522 due to the team's insistence on reviewing and editing.
- In 1516, Dominican monk and friend of Erasmus and More, Agostino Giustiniani released his polyglot psalter Psalterium Hebraeum, Graecum, Arabicum, et Chaldaicum, which included new Latin translations of the Septuagint and of the Aramaic. This was intended to be part of a larger polyglot bible, but did not find a market.
- In 1516 the Novum Instrumentum omne was dedicated to Pope Leo X. Erasmus obtained four-year "Publication Privileges" (a regional copyright) for the New Testament to attempt to ensure that his work would not be copied by other printers. He obtained also obtained one from Emperor Maximilian I. The edition was rushed to printing and with proofreading left to others, perhaps in commercial fear of the Complutensian being publishing first. (Note: "Epistle 694" in Collected Works of Erasmus Volume 5, 167. Erasmus said it was precipitated rather than edited: the Latin is prœcipitatum fuit verius quam editum.) The result was a large number of translation mistakes, transcription errors, and typos, that required further editions to be printed (see "Second Edition"). Erasmus made use of the Complutensian Polyglot in subsequent editions.
- In 1518, Erasmus' Italian publisher the Aldine Press published the first complete printed Greek bible, the Aldine Bible, pairing the Complutensian Septuagint Old Testament with Erasmus' initial New Testament.
- In 1522, Andreas Osiander published his own corrected Vulgate, and in 1527 a Gospel harmony.
- In 1527, Italian converso friar Santes Pagnino published new Latin translations of both the Old and New Testaments, from the Greek and Hebrew, also sponsored by Pope Leo X.

== Approach ==
Historian Erika Rummel identifies four tasks for the publication:

- "clarification of the New Testament's teachings on the basis of the Greek text;
- improvement of the Latin translation from a stylistic point of view;
- elimination of grammatical peculiarities and solecisms from the Latin New Testament; and
- the effort to provide the most accurate possible edition of the Greek New Testament."

However, Erasmus did not believe that a single translation could ever be a definitive rendition of a different language. Having multiple translations of the Latin plus the Greek, and especially his Annotations, allowed fuller coverage of the verses' meaning:

"In a translation, you can only express one meaning, but with the help of annotations it is possible to suggest various shades of meaning, leaving the reader free to choose. In my commentary I thus present what in my opinion lies closest to the original text, to the apostolic intention."

— Erasmus, Letter to Étienne Gaigny, May 1533

Because of this, Erasmus claimed his translation was not intended to supplant the Vulgate for public use, though both the Vulgate and the Greek needed to be purged of copyist errors. Indeed, demonstrating a nascent intuition of different text traditions, one of the aims was to allow comparison of the Latin quotes of the Western Church Fathers and the Greek quotes of the Eastern Church Fathers. However Erasmus even noted that sometimes even the original Greek itself may not fully convey the original meaning:

"And if there should be sermons of Christ in the Hebrew or Syrian-that is to say in the same languages as those in which he first spoke them -who would not cherish above all things the opportunity to philosophize in those languages and to master not only the eloquence and that which is specific to their vocabulary, but also to coax out their unique and sublime truth?"

— Erasmus, Preface, Novum Instumentum omne (1516)

The Greek and Latin New Testament with annotations was the scholarly part of his wider biblical program that included his Paraphrases (from his conviction that the humble and faithful unlearned could be true "theologians") and Patristic editions (from his conviction that even an optimal translation should not be read divorced from the understanding of the immediately succeeding generations of Christian teachers). Some historians have claimed that, for Erasmus' Philosophia christi, the popular Paraphrases were actually more important than the Novum Testamentum omne (in which, in turn, his Annotations were perhaps more important to him than his Latin and Greek recensions).

=== On scribal errors, mistranslations and corrections ===
According to historian Lucy Wooding, "Three points stand out: Erasmus did not expect to find a single definitive text; (Note: "Erasmian hermeneutics are notoriously difficult to describe clearly because Erasmus is always looking in two directions at once - both toward the ideal, perfectly expressive Word and toward the multitude of imperfect, human words caught in the tumult of history and transmission.") he was happy (like St Augustine) to see several possible interpretations of any given biblical verse; (Note: "Thus the multiple levels of meaning present in Scripture should be understood as a function of its immeasurable fecundity rather than a token of any ambiguity.…Erasmus treats the semiotic vagueness of a discourse caught up in history and contingency as a kind of linguistic felix culpa at the generative heart of communication …making more versions (and more mediations) possible.") and he expected ultimately to rely on Church tradition."

Erasmus himself later summarized his approach as philological, forensic and pre-theological, and that the formal aim was not to produce a definitive Greek recension or Latin translation: he included Patristic quotations as evidence about the existence of different traditions. Notably he did not warrant that his Greek manuscripts were necessarily more correct in every passage than the Latin sources:

"Accordingly, I do not publish this edition as if I intended it to be completely free of errors. For I translated whatever I found most frequently and most uniformly in the Greek, pointing out where our (Vulgate) version agrees or disagrees with it and indicating what seems to me to be the most correct.
I know that sacred matters are to be treated with religious reverence; therefore, even though I was engaged in a minor task, I was as circumspect as I could be. I collated the most ancient and reliable manuscripts in both languages, and indeed no small number of them. I investigated the commentaries of ancients and moderns, both Greek and Latin. I noticed the various readings they furnished. I weighed the meaning of the passage and only then did I pronounce what I thought. No, I did not even pronounce; rather I informed the reader, leaving everyone free to make up his own mind."

— Erasmus, The Chief Points in the Arguments Answering Some Crabby and Ignorant Critics

However: "I freely admit that there are a great many things that I could have treated in a more scholarly fashion. I do not deny that in some places I fell asleep out of weariness."

Erasmus' philological efforts helped launch what has been described as a "golden century of Catholic biblical scholarship" in the hundred years following his death.

=== Latin ===
Erasmus polished the Latin, declaring, "It is only fair that Paul should address the Romans in somewhat better Latin."

Initial editions had light revisions of the Vulgate. By the last editions, Erasmus' Latin version differs from the Vulgate for about 40% to 60% of the text. Erasmus frequently borrowed from Lefèvre d'Étaples's and Valla's translations. In the Fourth Edition, Erasmus included his own independent translation in addition to the revised Vulgate.

In the negative judgement of one modern scholar "Erasmus' (Latin) translation is a monstrous mix of Vulgate (Western) and Byzantine elements…Only linguistically, by the standards of humanistic Latin, is it an improvement...Erasmus changed the Vulgate text (of Heb. 9, in 5th ed.) wherever this seemed to him to be necessary or desirable, but otherwise he left it as it stood."

==== Examples ====
Erasmus' Latin contained several controversial renderings—different to or augmenting the Vulgate—(with philological or historical justifications in the Annotations) of words which became significant in the Reformation.

The Greek: metanoein was a notable problem: each of his editions of the New Testament adopted a different rendering from the Vulgate's Latin: poenitentiam agite (do penance): variously Latin: poeniteat vos (may you repent), Latin: poenitemini (repentance) and Latin: poenitentiam agite vitae prioris (repent of the former life). However the 1519—the edition used by Martin Luther's German translation—notably adopted Papal secretary Lorenzo Valla's suggestion of Latin: resipiscere (to repent, to become wise again, to recover from insanity or senility, or to regain consciousness) with historical justification from Lactantius, and with an intellective rather than affective connotation. (Note: Cook suggests that Latin: resipiscere was a particularly inflammatory choice as it suggested self-correction not only "with the sins, but with the errors, the madness, and the moral confusion of his own age." Latin: resipiscite is the ultimate word in The Complaint of Peace. Cook, Brendan (2007). "The Uses of Resipiscere in the Latin of Erasmus: In the Gospels and Beyond". Canadian Journal of History. 42 (3): 397–410. doi:10.3138/cjh.42.3.397.) In the 1522 Annotations Erasmus insisted that a true change of mind would include sorrow, confession, and satisfaction, the traditional three components of penance, yet noting that these components were not actually explicit in the traditional proof-text, 2 Cor 7:10.

Another important translation choice was Greek logos to Latin sermo (speech, conversation) rather than verbum (word), after the first edition. "Christ is for this reason called logos, because whatsoever the Father speaks, he speaks through the Son." This emphasized the Son as the self-disclosure of God, and dynamic or energetic rather than static. Critics worried this turned Christ into the Voice of God rather than the Mind of God.

For Romans 12:2, the Greek has συσχηματίζεσθε (syschēmatizesthe) and μεταμορφοῦσθε (metamorphousthe).

- The Vulgate Latin has conformani and reformamini.
- Erasmus rendered them configuremi and transformemeni.
- English Catholic bibles (Wycliffean, Douay-Rheims, etc) have "be conformed" and "be reformed". (Knox has "fall in" and "must be an inward change".)
- Tyndale-based bibles used "fashion" and "be changed".
- From the King James Version onwards, Protestant bibles used "be conformed" and "be transformed."

=== Greek ===
According to scholars such as Henk Jan de Jonge, "In judging the Greek text in Erasmus' editions of the New Testament, one should realize from the start that it was not intended as a textual edition in its own right, but served to give the reader of the Latin version, which was the main point, the opportunity to find out whether the translation was supported by the Greek." (Note: "The quality of the Greek edition made little difference, as long as it could justify the choice of wording and phraseology of the Latin translation." … "Ultimately, compared to the literary and linguistic quality of the Latin translation, the textual accuracy of the Greek edition was a matter of little moment to him. … Real influence could only be exercised by a Latin text.") The continuous Greek text only needed to be good enough for this ancillary purpose:

69. Even if the Greek manuscripts are as corrupt as the Latin ones, yet by collating several manuscripts one can normally find the right reading of any given passage.

— Erasmus, Contra morosos, Novum Testamentum omne, 1519

To some extent, Erasmus "synchronized" or "unified" the Greek (Byzantine) and the Latin textual traditions of the New Testament by producing an updated translation of both simultaneously. Both being part of canonical tradition, he clearly found it necessary to ensure that both were actually present in the same content. In modern terminology, he made the two traditions "compatible". This is clearly evidenced by the fact that his Greek text informs his Latin translation, but also the other way round: there are numerous instances of retroversion where he edits the Greek text to reflect his Latin version (and, perhaps, some lost Greek or patristic source from his prior research or annotation). Andrew J. Brown notes that "the adoption of a number of readings from Codex GA 1 and the Latin Vulgate meant that his Greek text to some extent reflected an eclectic mixture of “Alexandrian” and Byzantine elements."

In at least one case Erasmus resorted to back-translation: the manuscript page containing the last six verses of Revelation had been lost (from Minuscule 1^{rK}, as used for the first edition), so Erasmus translated the Vulgate's text back into Greek, noting what he had done. Erasmus also re-translated the Latin text into Greek wherever he found that the Greek text and the accompanying commentaries were mixed up, where his Greek manuscripts lacked words found in the Vulgate, or where he simply preferred the Vulgate's reading to the Greek text (e.g., at Acts 9:6). In Acts 9:6 the question that Paul asks at the time of his conversion on the Damascus road, Τρέμων τε καὶ θαμβὣν εἲπεν κύριε τί μέ θέλεις ποιῆσαι ("And he trembling and astonished said, Lord, what will you have me to do?") was incorporated from the Vulgate.

Erasmus was not aware that the Greek text of the New Testament text had multifurcated early (into different text types) and presumed that some Greek manuscripts had been "Latinized" from the Vulgate. By the same token, some of the errors he saw in the Vulgate actually reflect Greek transmissions he was not aware of.

In the negative judgement of a modern Dominican scholar "As an edition of the (Greek) New Testament, his work has no critical value, even by Renaissance standards. But it was the text that first revealed the fact that the Vulgate, the Holy Book of the Latin Church, was not only a second-hand document but, in places, quite erroneous."

In contrast, Andrew J. Brown judges "there is little justification for condemning Erasmus for his use of Byzantine manuscripts. Although the “standard” modern editions of the Greek New Testament provide many valid corrections of Erasmus’ text, some of the textual theories and assumptions underlying those editions have not been conclusively established. It remains possible that the text which Erasmus produced 500 years ago is, at numerous passages, better than some of the more recent editions which have attempted to replace it."

A notable result from Erasmus' choice of Greek manuscripts was the translation in Acts 17:26 of "God hath made of one blood all nations" (e.g. Tyndale) instead of the Vulgate's "of one" (e.g. Wycliff): both have old attestation. The use of "one blood" became a prooftext against slavery and racial discrimination.

=== Annotations and scholia ===
The New Testaments included scholia and various manifestos: various prefaces on methodology, a list of problems in the Vulgate translation, and substantial annotations justifying the word choices.

==== Methodus ====
One notable preface, Methodus, was expanded in the second edition, then spun out as an independent work: the "System (or Method) of True Theology" (Latin: ratio seu compendium verae theologiae, RVT): it promoted affective devotional reading where one inserts oneself into the Gospel situation as an observer of Christ's human actions and interactions, akin to the monastic Lectio Divina. Erasmus wrote that the “signs of profit from study” of the New Testament (RVT 1) using this method are, summarized:

First, not an increased facility in argumentation but an interior change, and a willingness to engage not in “conflictatio” with others but in “collatio”– a mutual interchange; secondly, a willingness to interrupt study with prayer, both petition for insight and thanksgiving for benefits, “sicubi te senseris profecisse” (“however you feel moved”)

— Thomas Merton

==== Paraclesis ====
His preface Paraclesis promoted scriptural knowledge for devotional use by even uneducated laymen, including the vernacular. (See Plowboy trope.)

if we had Christ's footprints or tunic they would be venerated, yet would merely tell us about his bodily form: the New Testament gives us a portrait of his mind. We can see him speaking, curing the sick, dying and rising again, almost more vividly that if we had seen him with our own eyes."

— Erasmus, Paraclesis, paraphrase by M.A. Screech.

Erasmus removed the Paraclesis from the fourth and fifth editions, instead having a Letter to the Pious Reader that pushed back against accusations of Lutheranism: "Above all we attest and desire that it be everywhere attested that we have never wished to detach ourselves by a finger or by a fingernail from the judgement of the Catholic Church. If by any chance anything implying the opposite should be found [in my writings], it was not said on purpose but involuntarily – for we are only human; and we wish that it should be considered as retracted."

==== Annotations ====
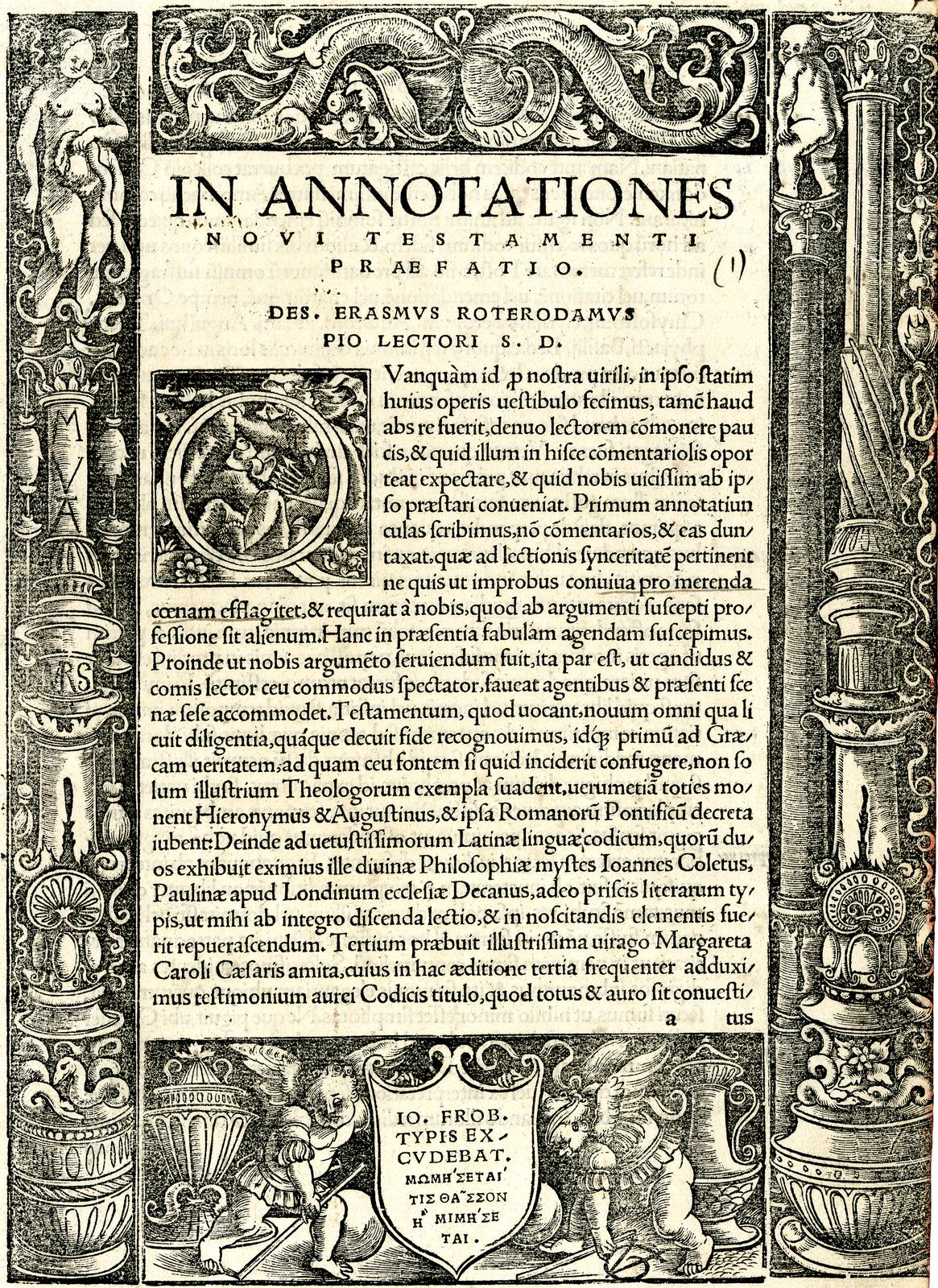
First page of Preface, Annotations of the New Testament (1521), with characteristic Froben decoration

The Annotations, from 1519 published as a supplementary volume, were a major and integral part the effort, and were thoroughly re-worked in each edition, almost tripling from 295 pages in 1516 to 783 pages in 1535.

The annotations were primarily philological, but later included more theological justifications in response to subsequent academic controversies. The annotations sometimes gave readings that were not adopted in his Latin, or were not derived from his Basel manuscripts. The initial notes were largely written in England and Brabant before the decision to create the Greek recension (and perhaps, the Latin recension too).

Much use was made of Latin and Greek church fathers (with the exception of the Cappadocian Fathers: Basil, Gregory of Nyssa, and Gregory of Nazianzen)' the book's title named Origen, Chrysostom, Cyril, Vulgarius, Jerome, Cyprian, Ambrose, Hilary, and Augustine, in particular. "In general he was appreciative of the early church Fathers and contemptuous of medieval commentators."

The Annotations sometimes provided and preferred Greek readings that differed from Erasmus' continuous Greek text: largely a result of his prior research in England, etc. Erasmus made use of Lorenzo Valla's Collatio Novi Testementi, which had been based on seven Greek and four Latin manuscripts in Italy, as well as noting variations by Church Fathers, as the title states. In England before coming to Basel in 1515, Erasmus had consulted with four Greek manuscripts; while the identity of these four manuscripts are not definitively known, scholar Andrew J. Brown has suggested that Codex GA69 (Codex Leicestrensis; Family 13, a Caesarean text type) and Codex GA56 (Gospels, Family 47, a Byzantine text type) or similar, would provide most readings in the Annotations not otherwise traceable.

The annotations gave extra material that helped subsequent vernacular translators, such as Johannes Lang and Martin Luther.

==== Apologia ====
The Apologia addressed concerns that textual variation, or any errors, undermines the authority of Scriptures:

If textual variation in the manuscripts completely deprives the Scriptures of their reliability, then, remember, there is manuscript variation in the Hebrew, in the Greek, and in the Latin.... To me the weight of argument makes it overwhelmingly probable that the whole of the New Testament was written in Greek, not Latin.
...I wholeheartedly support those who preach the inviolable authority of the divine Scriptures. ... But the sovereignty of Scripture lies in the originals themselves. ... Our concern is with the translators, with the scribes, with the corruptors. But if all authority collapses because of a certain number of corrupt passages, the Holy Spirit ought to have attended the copyists as he did the prophets and evangelists. The Holy Spirit is present everywhere but exerts his force in such a way as to leave some of the work for us to do. That inviolable authority of Scripture stopped with the prophets and apostles or evangelists. But it is the great glory of Scripture that, although re-expressed so often in so many languages, so often mutilated or corrupted by heretics, contaminated in so many ways by the carelessness of scribes, it nevertheless retains the vigour of eternal truth. So the church, constantly shaken by all the storm winds of adversity, stands firm.
... I do not refute the claim of some who say that mysteries are concealed in letters and dots, provided they acknowledge the hyperbole.

— Erasmus, The Apologia of Desiderius Erasmus of Rotterdam

== Preparation ==
Erasmus had been inspired back in 1504 by his discovery of Lorenzo Valla's Adnotationis Novum Testamentum, a work comparing the Latin Vulgate against Greek manuscripts. Erasmus republished Valla's work in 1505 and wrote in his preface about the need to recover the true text of the Bible. From 1499, encouraged by John Colet of Oxford, Erasmus began an intensive study of the Greek language.

He began studying, collecting and comparing Latin and Greek manuscripts far and wide in order to provide the world with a fresh Latin translation from the Greek. By 1505 he had completed the letters of Paul, and by 1509 the Gospels, with a large collection of notes.

Erasmus also "recognized the importance of biblical citations in the commentaries of the Fathers as valuable evidence for the original biblical text."

=== Latin skills preparation ===
Erasmus learned Latin at an early age, read voraciously, and for much of his life refused to write letters or speak in any language other than Latin, favouring classical syntax but embracing the expanded post-antiquity vocabulary. Over more than a decade, he assembled a large number of variants in Vulgate and patristic manuscripts, enabling him to choose those Latin readings which approached closest to the Greek texts in his judgement.

A key resource used for his initial Latin rendition (1516) was his long-prepared complete works of Jerome (1516), an author Erasmus had intensively studied and the editor of the Vulgate Latin version New Testament, which was in turn largely based on older Vetus Latina translations. In the later versions of the New Testament and Annotations, Erasmus made use material from his Froben editions of the Western and African patristic and classical authors, notably Ambrose and Augustine.

=== Greek skills preparation ===
Erasmus had, unusually, been taught basic classical Greek at school, but did not actively learn it until his mid 30s under the influence and assistance of his English circle, notable Greek experts Thomas Linacre and William Grocyn, and the writings of Lorenzo Valla, a Renaissance biblical scholar of the previous generation.

In 1506/1507 he lived and worked at the Aldine Press which supported a community of over 30 Greek scholars, many refugees, such as Janus Lascaris and his protégé Marco Musuro, and which conducted most of its business in Greek. In 1508 he studied in Padua with Giulio Camillo.

He honed his Greek-to-Latin translation skills by translating secular Greek authors, such as Lucian (with Thomas More), Euripides and classical Adages and Apophthegms. In the later versions of the New Testament and Annotations, Erasmus made use material from his Froben editions of the Eastern and African patristic and classical authors, notably Cyprian, Origen and John Chrysostom.

Erasmus was assisted by numerous scholars, both in Basel (such as Oecolampadius, for the first edition) and through his first-class network of correspondents (for example, he made enquiries of Papal Librarian Paulus Bombasius about Codex Vaticanus).

== First edition ==
In his dedication to Pope Leo X, whom he knew personally from his visits to Rome, Erasmus positioned the 1516 work within the humanist ad fontes (back to the source of the stream) program:

I perceived that that teaching which is our salvation was to be had in a much purer and more lively form if sought at the fountain-head and drawn from the actual sources than from pools and runnels. And so I have revised the whole New Testament (as they call it) against the standard of the Greek original... I have added annotations of my own, in order in the first place to show the reader what changes I have made, and why; second, to disentangle and explain anything that may be complicated, ambiguous, or obscure.

It was a bilingual edition; the Greek text was in a left column, the Latin in a right. The substantial annotations came from Erasmus' previous decade of manuscript and philological research throughout Western Europe.

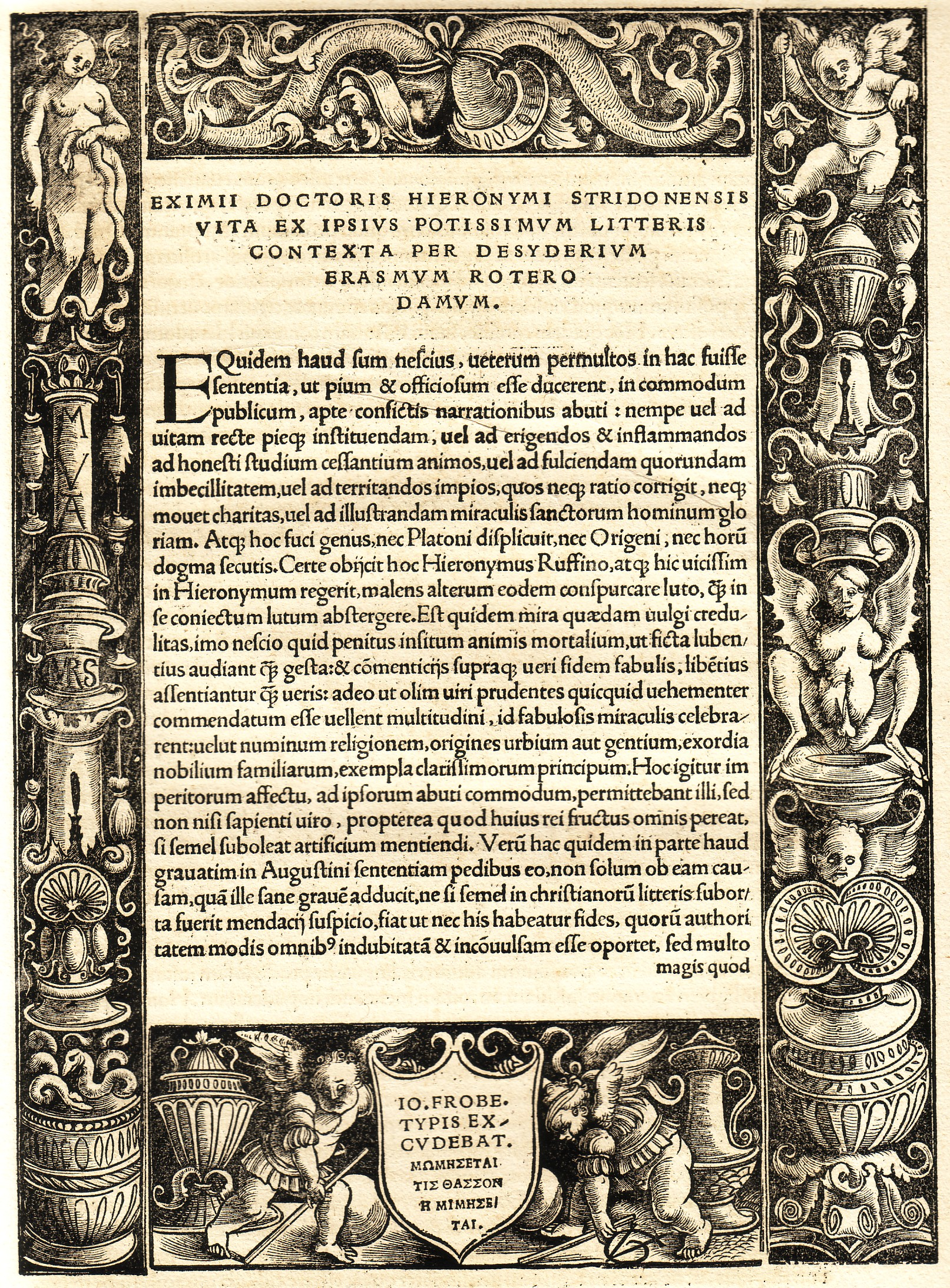
Acknowledgement page engraved and published by Johannes Froben, 1516

The initial Latin versions only lightly touched the Vulgate. (Note: "The revisions to the Vulgate in the first edition of 1516 were limited and conservative.") Some later editions gave Erasmus' own Latin translation, which was still based on the Vulgate but slightly more revised especially with more polished Latin. The Annotations had been researched during the previous decade with recourse to many Latin and Greek sources.

=== Froben Press ===
On a visit to Basel in August 1514, he contacted Swiss-German printer Johann Froben of Basel It seems that it was decided first to make his word notes into annotations on the Greek and Vulgate Latin, and then, at a late stage, to use a new Latin translation.

In their own advocacy of the competing Alexandrian text-type and Critical Text against Erasmus' work, Victorian scholar S. P. Tregelles and modern critical scholar Bruce Metzger speculated that Froben might have heard about "the forthcoming Spanish Polyglot Bible," and tried to overtake the project of Cardinal Francisco Jiménez de Cisneros for commercial reasons. However, not only had the Complutensian Polyglot New Testament already been printed back in January 1514, months before Erasmus met with Froben in August, but the historical record shows the Pope had issue with some translations in the Polyglot. Translator Antonio de Nebrija quit the Polyglot project when Cardinal Cisneros refused to allow him to alter the translations according to the Pope's satisfaction.

In July 1515, Erasmus travelled from his Brabant base to Basel. Student Johannes Oecolampadius served as his editorial assistant and Hebrew consultant.

The printing began on 2 October 1515, and in very short time was finished (1 March 1516). It was produced quickly – Erasmus declared later that the first edition was "precipitated rather than published" (praecipitatum verius quam editum) – with hundreds of spelling and typographical errors Against his usual practice, Erasmus was absent for some of the printing leaving the correction to his assistants, who introduced their own errors as well.

=== Title ===
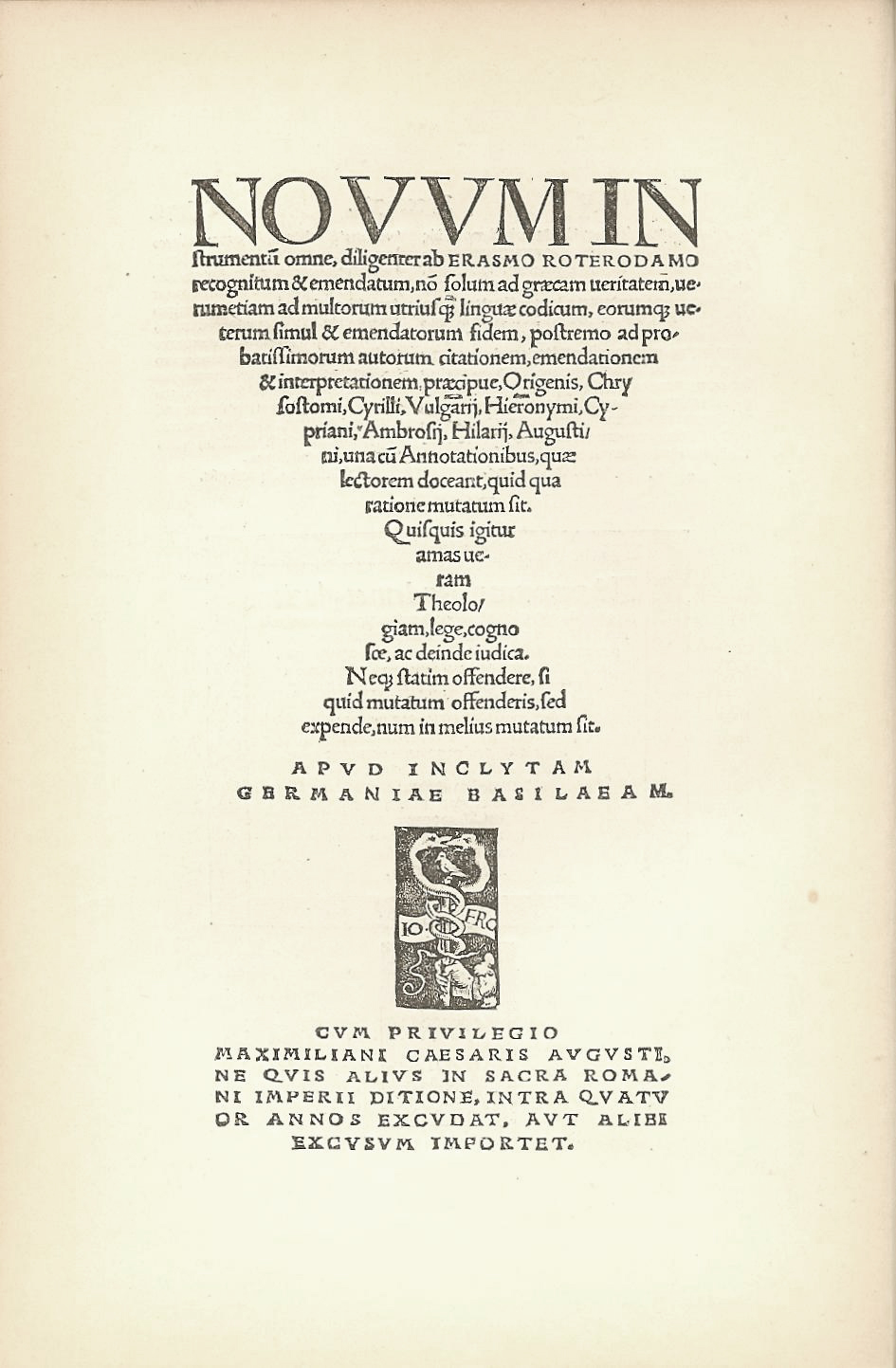
The title page of Erasmus' 1516 New Testament from Froben

The title translated to English is:

All New Instrument, diligently reexamined and improved by Erasmus of Rotterdam: not only from the original Greek, but also from many others, from codices in each language, of the ancient faith with corrections, finally from the citation, emendation and interpretation of the most approved authors, especially Origen, Chrysostom, Cyril, Vulgarius, Jerome, Cyprian, Ambrose, Hilary, Augustine. Together with annotations, which teach the reader what has been changed for what reason.

In other words, an improved Latin text, derived from a variety of manuscripts including Greek, informed by the usages of Church Fathers, plus justifications in annotations.

In Latin:

Novum Instrumentum omne, diligenter ab Erasmo Rot. Recognitum et Emendatum, non solum ad Graecam veritatem verum etiam ad multorum utriusq; linguae codicum eorumq; veterum simul et emendatorum fidem, postremo ad probatissimorum autorum citationem, emendationem et interpretationem, praecipue, Origenis, Chrysostomi, Cyrilli, Vulgarij, Hieronymi, Cypriani, Ambrosij, Hilarij, Augustini, una cum Annotationibus, quae lectorem doceant, quid qua ratione mutatum sit.

An instrumentum is a decision put down in writing.

=== Greek sources ===
Erasmus mentions in his Apologio that his preparation of the continuous Latin text proceeded in several editorial stages: for the first edition, the first stage (in England, 1512-1514) used four Greek manuscripts; the second (in Basel, 1514-1515) used five manuscripts, and the variations were put into a "general pool" from which was drawn the Annotations and various Latin revisions. However, some scholars debate the sources, timings or process.

To prepare a continuous Greek text for the First Edition, Erasmus and team used several manuscripts available locally in Basel,. (Note: For a detailed description of the manuscripts, which also mentions the use of a commentary on Paul's epistles by Theophylact, see Andrist, Patrick (2016). "Structure and History of the Biblical Manuscripts used by Erasmus for his 1516 Edition". In Wallraff, Martin; Menchi, Silvana Seidel; von Greyerz, Kaspar (eds.). Reconsidering the Relationship, Basel 1516: Erasmus' Edition of the New Testament. Tubingen: Mohr Siebeck. pp. 81–124. ISBN 978-3-16-154522-1.) Scholars have identified eight Greek manuscripts as the sources of the continuous Greek text of the first edition: in Basel, Erasmus had three Greek manuscripts with the Gospels and Acts, five manuscripts with the Pauline epistles, three manuscripts with the Catholic epistles, but only one manuscript with the Book of Revelation. It seems that Erasmus did not intend to make a critical edition of the Greek, as such. He selected Minuscules 2^{e} (GA 2) and 2^{ap} (GA 2815) and sent them to the printers "somewhat corrected" against the other manuscripts.

Manuscript	GA	Content	Date
Minuscule 2^{e}	2	Gospels (main)	12th century
Minuscule 2^{ap}	2815	Acts and Epistles (main)	12th century
Minuscule1^{rK}	2814	Book of Revelation, in commentary by Andreas c. 600	12th century
Minuscule 4^{ap}	2816	Acts and Epistles	15th century
Minuscule 7^{p}	2817	Pauline epistles	12th century
Minuscule 817	817	Gospels, in commentary by Theophylact c.1100	15th century
Minuscule 1^{eap}	1	the entire NT except Revelation	12th century
	2105	Pauline Epistles in commentary by Theophylact (1 use: Gal 3:8)	14th century

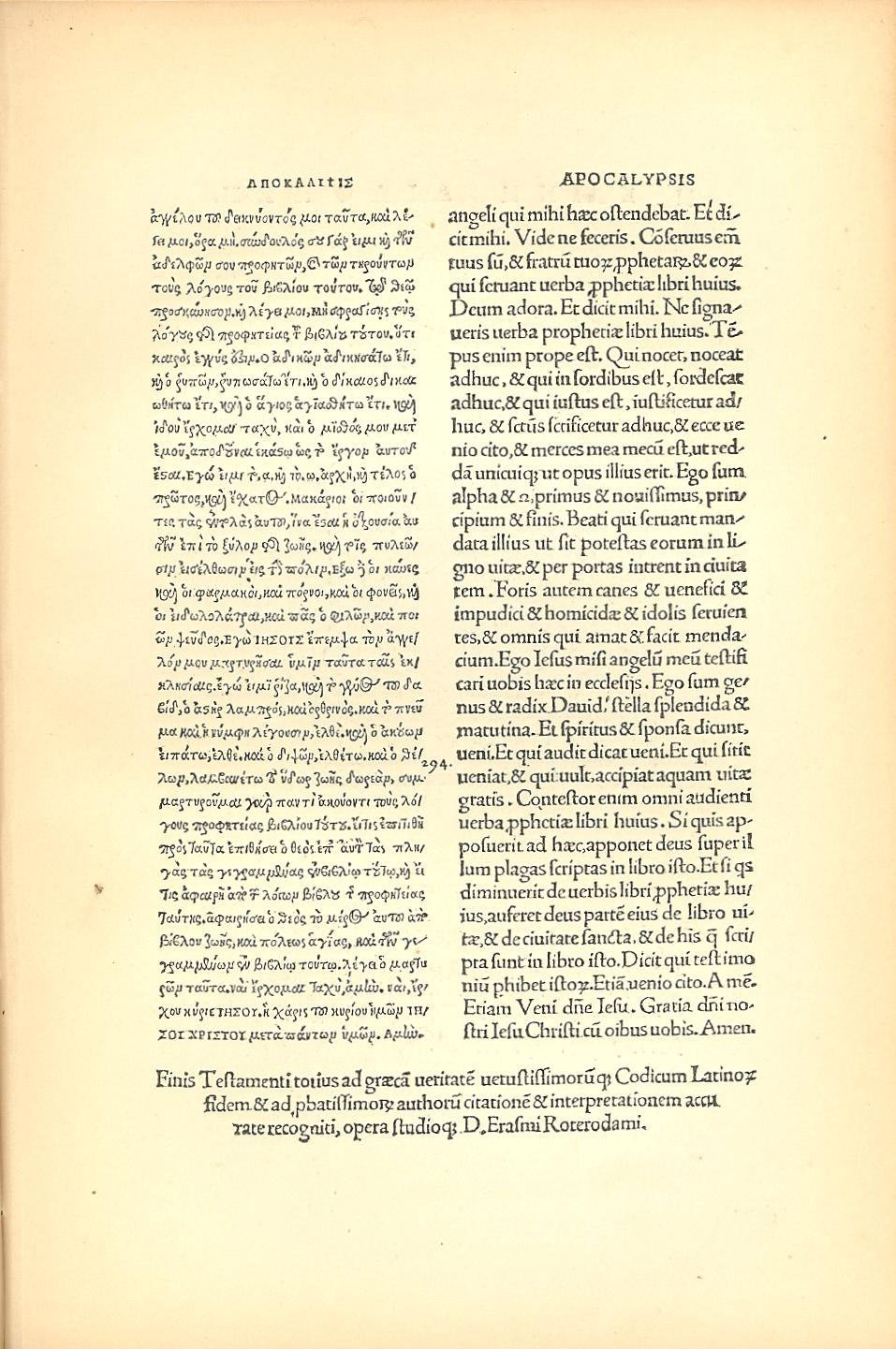
The last page of the Erasmian New Testament (Rev 22:8-21)

He borrowed most manuscripts from the local Dominicans convent's library. (Note: Most of these Greek manuscripts came from the collection that had been bequeathed in 1443 to the Dominican monastery at Basel by John of Ragusa, who had brought them in 1437 from Constantinople for the Council of Basel which in small part resolved the Eastern schism; see Bo Reicke, Erasmus und die neutestamentliche Textgeschichte, Theologische Zeitschrift, XXII (1966), pp. 254-265.) Manuscripts 1^{eap} and 1^{rK} Erasmus borrowed from Johannes Reuchlin.

The Greek text of the accompanying Annotations and the updated Latin were based on his lengthy manuscript research throughout Western Europe, in particular the four unidentified manuscripts available at Cambridge.

==== Revelation ====
===== Sources =====
Erasmus had a problem with the Book of Revelation, in that he could find no old Greek manuscript which contained it. The book was not used in the liturgical readings of the Greek or Latin churches (and still now rarely), was not in e.g. Codex Vaticanus, it was only established as part of the canon of Scripture late, and in Erasmus' view was of dubious apostolicity. Furthermore, apocalypticism was diametrically opposed to the spirituality and mentality of Erasmus' Renaissance humanism; Erasmus' relative disinterest may be gauged from that he did not write a paraphrase of Revelation and provided only brief notes in the Annotations: only five pages in the first edition.

Rather than omit the book, he adopted a different strategy to the rest of the New Testament: he obtained from Johannes Reuchlin Minuscule 2814, a Greek interlinear commentary on Revelation by Andreas of Caesarea, and had an assistant extract the embedded scriptural text which Erasmus then used for correction. He was not in Basel to correct these printer's proofs.

===== Missing Text =====
However, the Reuchlin manuscript was not complete, the leaf that contained the last six verses of Revelation 22 (the final chapter) having been torn off. Erasmus decided to back-translate the missing verses Rev. 16:16-21 from the Latin Vulgate into Greek, in his Annotations alerting readers that he had provided some words from the Latin, and thereby provoking enduring controversy. (Note: Historians have disputed that Erasmus intended to provide any kind of critical edition of the Greek. One of Erasmus' points to Luther in their debate on free choice was that Luther (paradoxically on the basis of Erasmus' annotations and translation) was insisting on a singularity and clarity of meaning of some verses that was not supportable.)

Erasmus explained his thinking in a response to strong criticism from Edward Lee:

There was no doubt that the words had been omitted, and they were only a few. To avoid leaving a lacuna in my text, I supplied the Greek out of our Latin version. I did not want to conceal this from the reader, however, and admitted in the annotations what I had done. My thought was that the reader, if he had access to a manuscript, could correct anything in our words that differed from those put by the author of this work. ... And yet I would not have dared to do in the Gospels or even in the apostolic Epistles what I have done here. The language of this book is very simple, and the content has mostly a historical sense, not to mention that the authorship was once uncertain. Finally, this passage is merely the conclusion of the work.

— Erasmus, Letter to Lee

According to scholar Jan Krans, in the second sentence Erasmus was justifying (to Lee) his approach as in fact heeding the content of the missing text, which includes the famous curse on omission or addition of verses: it would be bold or rash to not correct the missing text that itself specified that there should be no omissions.

For the second edition, Erasmus instructed that the text of the more recent Aldine edition (a corrected edition of Erasmus' first edition) be used, unaware that it did not have significant revisions for Revelation. For the fourth edition, Erasmus had access to the Complutensian Polyglot edition, but did not know the nature or provenance of the Complutensian's manuscript sources, which is still a subject of research.

===== Tree of Life =====
Erasmus took from the Vulgate the textual variant libro vitae (book of life) instead of ligno vitae (tree of life) in Revelation 22:19. (Note: However, textual scholar Hoskier claimed that Erasmus did not use the Vulgate, instead suggesting that Erasmus used other Greek manuscripts such as Minuscule 2049. See: Hoskier, Herman C. (1929). Concerning the Text of the Apocalypse. Vol. 2. London: Bernard Quaritch. p. 644.)

===== Other Latin-based Readings =====
Even in other parts of Revelation and other books of the New Testament, Erasmus occasionally introduced self-created Greek text material taken from the Vulgate. F. H. A. Scrivener remarked that in Rev. 17:4, instead of using τὰ ἀκάθαρτα (the impure), Erasmus created a new Greek word: ἀκαθάρτητος. In Rev. 17:8 he used καιπερ εστιν (and yet is) instead of και παρεσται (and shall come). (Note: Textus Receptus advocate Hills concluded that Erasmus was "guided providentially by the common faith to include" Latin Vulgate readings into his Greek text. See: F. Hills, Edward (1984). The King James Version Defended! (PDF) (4th ed.). Ankeny: Christian Research Press. pp. 147, 156–157.)

Several philologist have noted that some of Erasmus' Greek innovations in his printed New Testaments subsequently found their way into some later-produced Greek manuscripts, confusing the historicity of the phrases.

== Second edition ==
The reception of the first edition by some theologians was mixed, but the English bishops who had been Erasmus' primary sponsors and mentors on the project were enthusiastic at the result, and within three years a second was made. Erasmus' network of friends and correspondents, notably (Master of the Rolls and future bishop) Cuthbert Tunstall, supplied many improvements for the Latin text, and Erasmus reported that on his travels in Brabant and England he had re-examined the whole New Testament in two languages against many unidentified codexes. Pope Leo X contributed a letter of recommendation, featured as one of the prefaces.f

Erasmus described it as "a new work": it used the more familiar term Testamentum instead of Instrumentum. (A testamentum is an agreement without a written record.)

For this edition, Erasmus re-worked his initial revision of Vulgate recension of earlier Latin translations into a new, more elegant translation. The Latin text frequently provided alternative phrasing to the Vulgate's. About 40% of the Latin words were changed in some way, frequently for better grammar. This new Latin translation had a good reception, and "minor editions" of the 1519 version were printed in Basel by other publishers with just the Latin without the Greek or Annotations in 1520 and subsequent years: Erasmus wrote new simpler evangelical prefaces for these "low profile" editions.

In the second edition Erasmus also used Minuscule 3 (Codex Corsendoucensis, or Vindobonensis Suppl. Gr. 52, entire NT except Revelation; 12th century) and an unidentified Gospel codex. The Greek text was changed in about 400 places, with most—though not all—of the typographical errors corrected. Some new erroneous readings were added to the text.

The Aldine press had in 1518 produced its own version of the first edition, with its own corrections from unknown Greek manuscripts in Venice. These changes were also considered by Erasmus.

The second edition became the basis for Luther's German translation.

After this edition, Erasmus was involved in many polemics and controversies. Particularly objectionable were the objections from the universities of Cambridge and Oxford, such as over the Comma Johanneum.

== Third edition ==
The Greek of the third edition (1522) differed in 118 places from the second. It addressed many issues raised by opponents such as Lee and Stunica; though Erasmus tended to call corrections printer's errors.

In this edition Erasmus, after using Codex Montfortianus, misprinted εμαις for εν αις in Apocalypse 2:13.

Recent research suggests Erasmus likely included more than 30 new readings from Volume V of the Complutensian Polyglot, without attributing them.

Oecolampadius and Gerbelius, who had assisted Erasmus, insisted that he introduce more readings from the minuscule 1^{eap} in the third edition. But according to Erasmus the text of this codex was altered from the Latin manuscripts, and had only secondary value.

He also found several important new Latin sources with alternative Latin renderings he used, such as a commentary of the Venerable Bede.

This edition was used by William Tyndale for the first English New Testament (1526), by Robert Estienne as a base for his editions of the Greek New Testament from 1546 and 1549, and by the translators of the Geneva Bible and King James Version. Publishers outside Basel frequently re-printed or cannibalized Erasmus' work without license: Erasmus' Latin Matthew, and his preface, were bundled with Johannes Lang's German translation in 1522.

=== Comma Johanneum ===
López de Zúñiga, known as Stunica, one of the editors of Ximenes' Complutensian Polyglot, reproached Erasmus that his text lacked part of the 1 John 5:7-8 (Comma Johanneum). Erasmus replied that he had not found it in any Greek manuscript. Stunica answered that Latin manuscripts are more reliable than Greek. In 1520 Edward Lee accused Erasmus of tendencies toward Arianism and Pelagianism, and of unorthodox sacramentology. Erasmus replied that he had not found any Greek manuscript that contained these words, he answered that this was a case not of omission or removal, but simply of non-addition. He showed that even some Latin manuscripts did not contain these words.

Erasmus asked his friend, the Prefect of the Vatican Library, Paulus Bombasius, to check the Codex Vaticanus. Bombasius sent two extracts from this manuscript containing the beginnings of 1 John 4 and 5, which has three dots in the margin but not the text of the Comma.

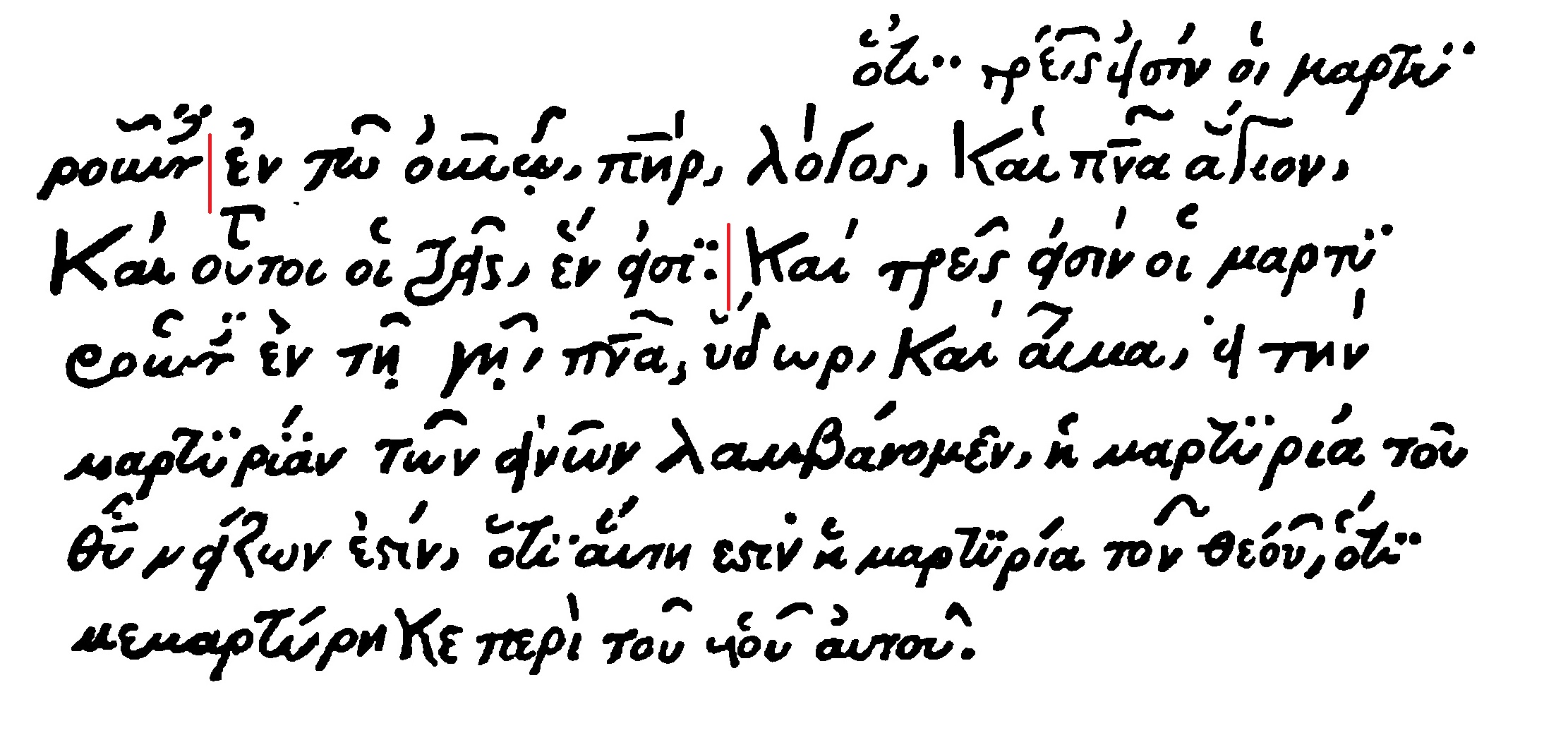
Comma Johanneum in Codex Montfortianus

However, from the third edition the Comma Johanneum was included. A single 16th-century Greek manuscript subsequently had been found that contained it. (Codex Montfortianus)

- Erasmus included it, though he expressed doubt as to the authenticity of the passage in his Annotations.
- This manuscript had allegedly been produced to order in 1520, back-translated from the Vulgate, by Francis Frowick, an English Observant Franciscan and a friend of Erasmus, however Frowick retired or died in 1518.
- An often repeated story is that Erasmus included it, because he felt bound by a promise to include it if a manuscript was found that contained it. Henk Jan de Jonge, a specialist in Erasmian studies, stated that there is no explicit evidence that supports this frequently-made assertion concerning a specific promise made by Erasmus: so the real reason to include the Comma by Erasmus, has been speculated as care for his good name and for the success of his Novum Testamentum or as a general editorial policy that disfavoured omissions (i.e. as with the end of Revelation.)

== Fourth edition ==
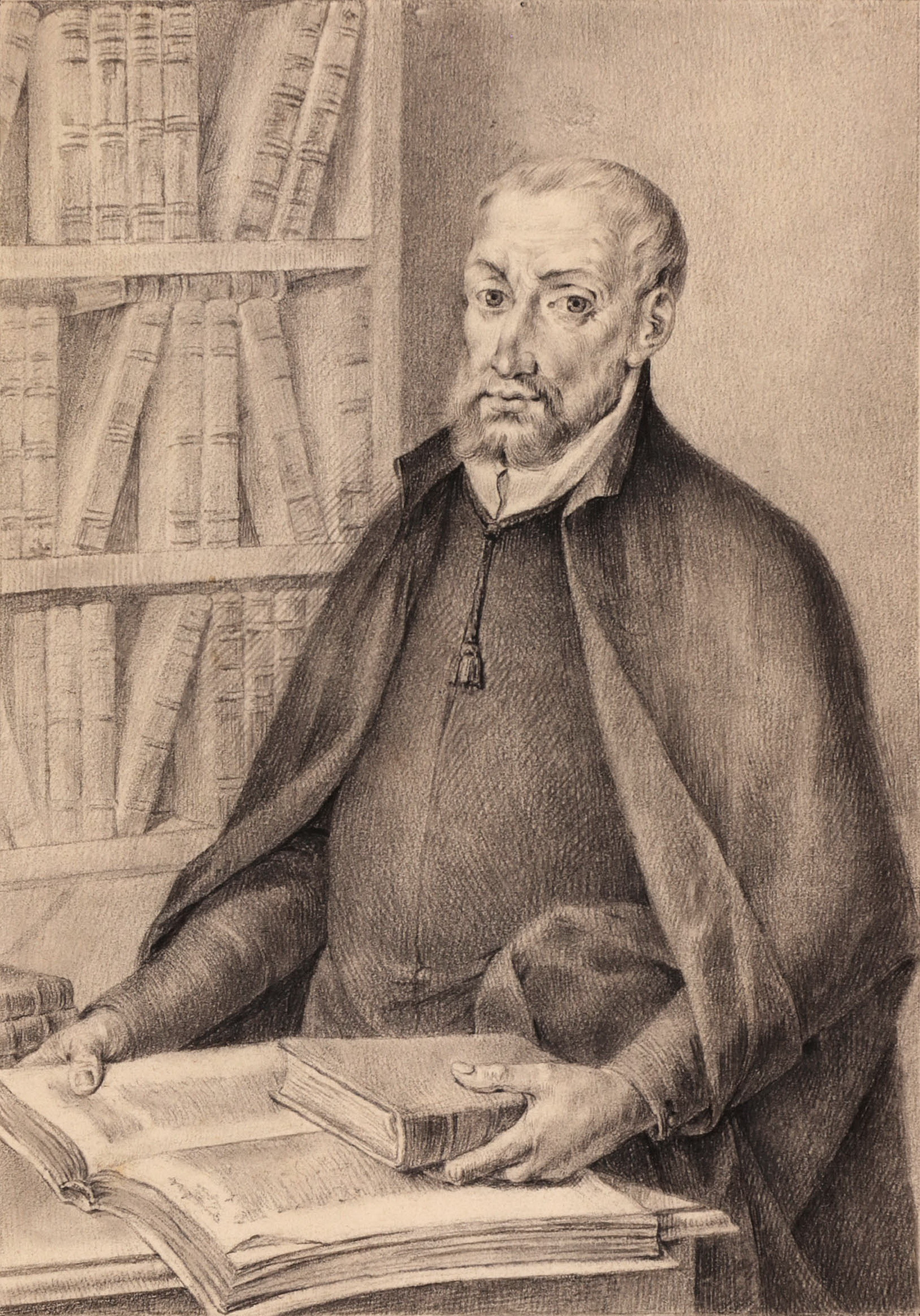
Sepúlveda

The fourth edition (1527) was printed in a new format of three parallel columns, they contain the updated Greek, Erasmus' own Latin version, and a standard Vulgate. Except in Revelation, the Greek of the fourth edition differed only in about 20 places from the third (though according to Mill it is only about 10 places).

Shortly after the publication of his third edition, Erasmus had seen the Complutensian Polyglot, and used its Greek text for improvement of his own text. In the Book of Revelation he altered his fourth edition in about 90 passages on the basis of the Complutensian text. Unfortunately Erasmus may have forgotten what places of the Apocalypse he translated from Latin and he did not correct all of them.

In November 1533, before the appearance of the fifth edition, Sepúlveda sent Erasmus a description of an ancient Vatican manuscript, informing him that it differed from the fourth edition text in favour of the Vulgate in 365 places. Nothing is known about these 365 readings except for one. Erasmus in Adnotationes to Acts 27:16 wrote that according to the Codex from the Library Pontifici (i.e. Codex Vaticanus) name of the island is καυδα (Cauda), not κλαυδα (Clauda) as in his Novum Testamentum (Tamet si quidam admonent in codice Graeco pontificiae bibliothecae scriptum haberi, καυδα, id est, cauda). (Note: Andrew Birch was the first, who identified this note with 365 readings of Sepulveda.) In another letter sent to Erasmus in 1534 Sepúlveda informed him, that Greek manuscripts had been influenced by the Vulgate.

== Final edition ==
The fifth edition of Erasmus, published in 1535, the year before his death, discarded the Vulgate again and omitted the well-known Paraclesis and the list of solecisms of the Vulgate. Otherwise it was a minor revision: according to Mill the continuous Greek of the fifth edition differed only in four places from the fourth.

The fifth edition was the basis of Robert Estienne's 1550 New Testament, which was the first variorum critical edition of the Greek, showing variants from the Complutensian Polyglot. Estienne's edition was used as the basis of Theodore Beza's versions, the Elzevier's 1633 Textus Receptus editions, and the base text of John Mill's 1707 critical edition.

Popular demand for Greek New Testaments led to a flurry of further authorized and unauthorized editions in the early sixteenth century; almost all of which were based on Erasmus's work and incorporated his particular readings, although typically also making a number of minor changes of their own. Tregelles gives Acts 13:33 as an example of the places in which commonly received text did not follow Erasmian text (εν τω ψαλμω τω πρωτω → εν τω ψαλμω τω δευτερω).

== Subsequent developments ==
=== Protestant ===
The first generation of Protestant vernacular bible translations into Germanic languages were based on Luther's German and Erasmus' Latin, with the unfamiliar Greek being used as supporting evidence. However, for Protestants, interest in Erasmus' Latin version was superseded by vernacular translations and increasing focus on the supposed Greek and Hebrew original texts.

After his death, several decades of revision of Erasmus' Greek text became known as the Textus Receptus ("received text") Greek family; this was the basis for most Western non-Catholic vernacular translations for the subsequent 350 years, until the new recensions of Westcott and Hort (1881 and after) and Eberhard Nestle (1898 and after.) His annotations continued to be respected and used.

=== Catholic ===
For Catholics, Erasmus' main thrust (that the Vulgate's Latin text had suffered a millennium of scribal variations and should be revised in light of old texts in the original languages and patristic usage) was accepted at and following the Council of Trent, even if his own Latin recension was not favoured: Trent called for a new standardized "Vulgate" edition corrected with contemporary scholarship: "The council decrees and determines that hereafter the sacred scriptures, particularly in this ancient Vulgate edition, shall be printed after a thorough revision."

After Erasmus' death, his work was republished and revised notably by Robert Stephanus: the corrected Latin Vulgate and the Greek text became a reference text for the Catholic Leuven Vulgate (ostensibly translated from Latin sources only, and the basis of contemporary Catholic vernacular translations such as the Douay-Rheims Bible English, Dutch, French, Polish, etc.) and ultimately the official Sixto-Clementine Vulgate; Erasmus' Latin translation choices and annotations were considered during the preparation of the Sixto-Clementine Vulgate (1592), and the Vulgate itself was replaced for official use by the Nova Vulgata (1979), a version that gave greater weight to the Greek and Hebrew.

However, Erasmus' Latin recension was side-lined from liturgical use and scholastic disputation following the Council of Trent, which decreed that "the old and Vulgate edition...(should) be, in public lectures, disputations, sermons and expositions, held as authentic; no one is to date or presume to reject it under any pretext whatever."

Protestant polemicists asserted very strong interpretations of this decree: for example Jean Calvin claimed the Trent decrees are "condemning all translations except the Vulgate" including the Greek and Hebrew.

In practice, this decree established that the Vulgate (largely based by e.g. Jerome on the Western text-type Vetus Latina, with the Deuterocanonical books derived from the Septuagint and adjusted in phraseology to be more like the Alexandrian and Byzantine text-types) was a distinct and authentic text tradition (similar to the Greek traditions, the Syriac, etc.) that must not be rejected as inauthentic, not having less or greater status than other traditions. And that this version, with corrections, was uniquely approved for public use, as distinct from e.g., written scholarly or private devotional or musical use.

== See also ==
- Complutensian Polyglot Bible
- Editio Regia
- Textus Receptus
