= Erasmus =

Dutch philosopher and theologian (c. 1466–1536)

Doctor Desiderius Erasmus
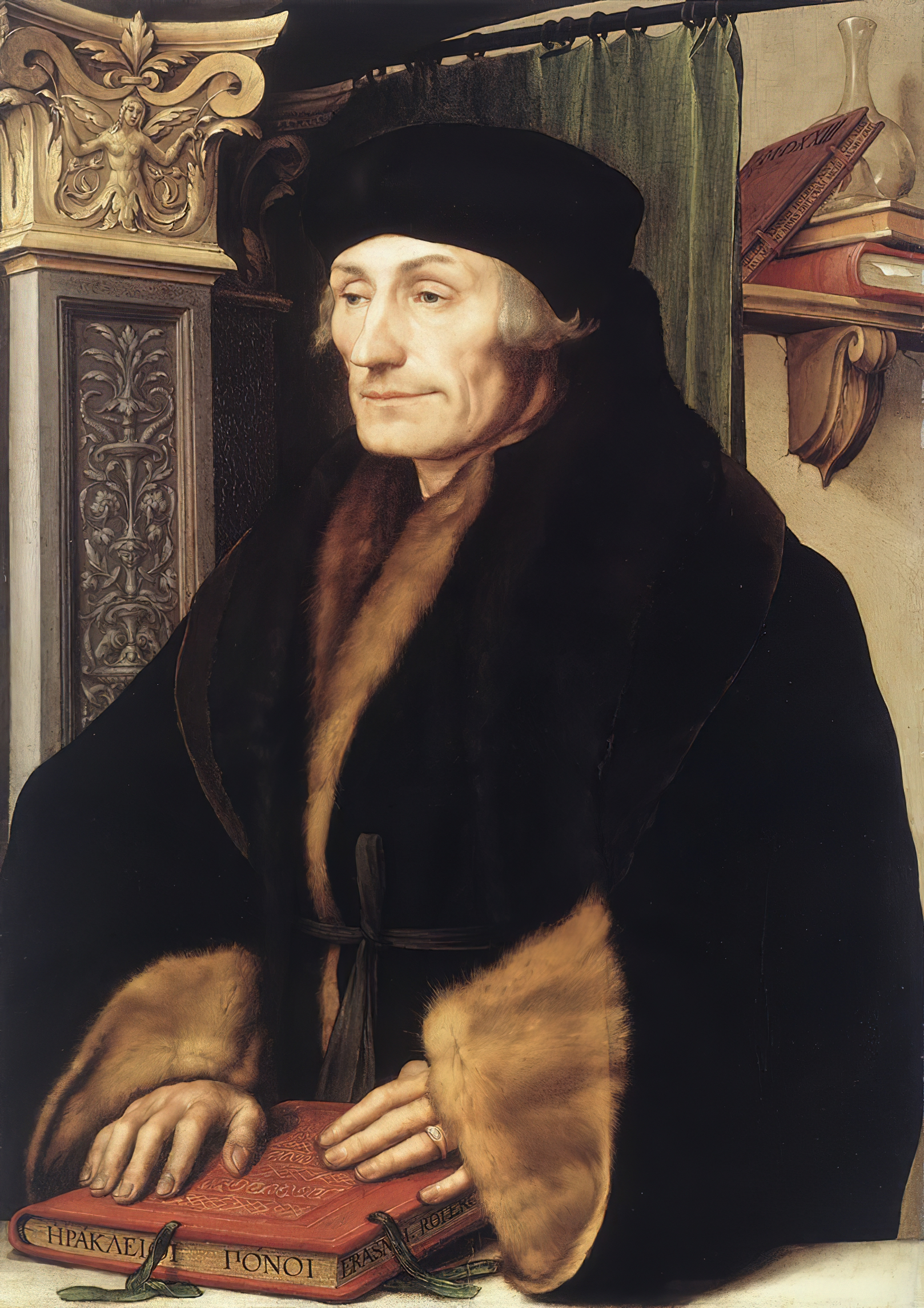
- Erasmus, in a 1523 portrait by Hans Holbein the Younger
- Born: c. 28 October 1466; Rotterdam or Gouda, Burgundian Netherlands, Holy Roman Empire
- Died: 12 July 1536 (aged 69); Basel, Old Swiss Confederacy
- Other name: Desiderius Erasmus Roterodamus
- Known for: New Testament translations and exegesis, satire, pacificism, letters, author and editor
- Awards: Counsellor to Charles V (hon.)

Academic background
- Education: University of Paris; Queens' College, Cambridge; University of Turin (STD, 1506)
- Academic advisor: Alexander Hegius
- Influences: Gospels; Jerome; Origen; Lorenzo Valla; John Colet; Jean Vitrier; John Fisher; Aldus Manutius; Cicero; Socrates; Augustine of Hippo; Thomas Aquinas

Academic work
- Era: Northern Renaissance
- School or tradition: Renaissance humanism
- Institutions: University of Cambridge; University of Oxford; University of Leuven
- Notable students: William Blount; Juan Luis Vives
- Main interests: Bonae litterae; Philology; Pastoral theology; Patristics; Catholic theology; Political philosophy; Philosophy of education; Criticism of Protestantism
- Notable works: The Praise of Folly; Handbook of a Christian Knight; On Civility in Children; Julius Excluded; The Education of a Christian Prince; Novum Instrumentum omne; On Free Will
- Notable ideas: Philosophia Christi; Biblical ad fontes; Erasmian pronunciation; Critique of just war theory; accommodation; Lectio difficilior potior
- Influenced: Thomas More; Martin Luther; Philip Melanchthon; Huldrych Zwingli; Johannes Oecolampadius; William Tyndale; John Calvin; Wolfgang Capito; Damião de Góis; François Rabelais; Miguel de Cervantes; William Shakespeare; Ignatius of Loyola; Francis De Sales; John Henry Newman; Henri de Lubac

Ecclesiastical career
- Religion: Christianity
- Church: Catholic Church
- Ordained: 25 April 1492

Desiderius Erasmus Roterodamus (/ˌdɛzɪˈdɪəriəs ɪˈræzməs/ DEZ-i-DEER-ee-əs irr-AZ-məs; Dutch: [ˌdeːziˈdeːrijʏs eːˈrɑsmʏs]; 28 October c. 1466 – 12 July 1536), commonly known in English as Erasmus of Rotterdam or simply Erasmus, was a Dutch humanist, theologian, and philosopher. He was, through his writings and translations, one of the most influential scholars of the Northern Renaissance and a major figure of Western culture.

Erasmus was an important figure in Renaissance classical scholarship who wrote in a spontaneous, copious and correct but natural Latin style. (Note: "Erasmus charged the reading world with a style which, though far from correct [Ciceronian] Latin, is the most delightful which the Renaissance has left us. [...] Erasmus's Latin was a living and spoken tongue." Encyclopedia Britannica) As a Catholic priest developing humanist techniques for working on texts, he prepared pioneering new Latin and Greek scholarly editions of the New Testament and of the Church Fathers, with annotations and commentary that were immediately and vitally influential in both the Protestant Reformation and the Catholic Reformation. He also wrote On Free Will, The Praise of Folly, The Complaint of Peace, Handbook of a Christian Knight, On Civility in Children, Copia: Foundations of the Abundant Style and many other academic, popular and pedagogical works.

Erasmus lived against the backdrop of the growing European religious reformations and relocated regularly. He influenced a large circle of friends, scholars and correspondents (Note: "Yvonne Charlier remarked that Erasmus attracted friends as light attracts insects.") including kings and popes. He developed a biblical humanistic theology in which he advocated the religious and civil necessity both of peaceable concord and of pastoral tolerance on matters of indifference. He remained a member of the Catholic Church all his life, remaining committed to reforming the church from within, but faced dangerous pushback from some university theologians. He promoted what he understood as the traditional doctrine of synergism, which some prominent reformers such as Martin Luther and John Calvin rejected in favour of the doctrine of monergism. His influential middle-road approach disappointed, and even angered, partisans in both camps. (Note: Erasmus was criticised for initially being unwilling to take sides publicly, or to see some aspects of truth or pride in both sides, on many issues. He preferred to participate in controversies he generated himself, rather than the controversies of others. He invoked a story from Cassiodorus, where the monk Saint Telemachus entered the arena of the Roman stadium to separate fighting gladiators, but was stoned by the crowd.)

== Biography ==
Erasmus's 69 years may be divided into quarters. (Note: Vollerthun and Richardson suggest three phases, grouping the first two-quarters for their purposes.)

- First was his medieval Dutch childhood, ending with him being orphaned and impoverished;
- Second, his struggling years as a canon (a kind of semi-monk), a clerk, a priest, a failing and sickly university student, a would-be poet, and a tutor;
- Third, his flourishing but peripatetic High Renaissance years of increasing focus and literary productivity following his 1499 contact with a reformist English circle notably John Colet and Thomas More, then with radical French Franciscan Jean Vitrier (or Voirier), (Note: Colet and Vitrier were "two of the deepest influences on his life.") and later with the Greek-speaking Aldine New Academy in Venice; engaging with leading intellectuals and reform-minded churchmen of the West; and
- Fourth, his financially more secure Reformation years first in Basel and then as a Catholic religious refugee in Freiburg: as a prime influencer of European thought through his New Testament projects and increasing public opposition to aspects of Lutheranism, in direct correspondence with kings and popes.

=== Early life ===
Desiderius Erasmus is reported to have been born in Rotterdam on 27 or 28 October ("the vigil of Simon and Jude") in the late 1460s. He was named (Note: Erasmus was his baptismal name, given after Erasmus of Formiae. Desiderius was an adopted additional name, which he used from 1496. The Roterodamus was a scholarly name meaning "from Rotterdam", though the Latin toponymic adjective would be Roterdamensis.) after Erasmus of Formiae, whom Erasmus's father Gerard (Gerardus Helye) personally favored. Although associated closely with Rotterdam, he lived there for only four years, never to return afterwards.

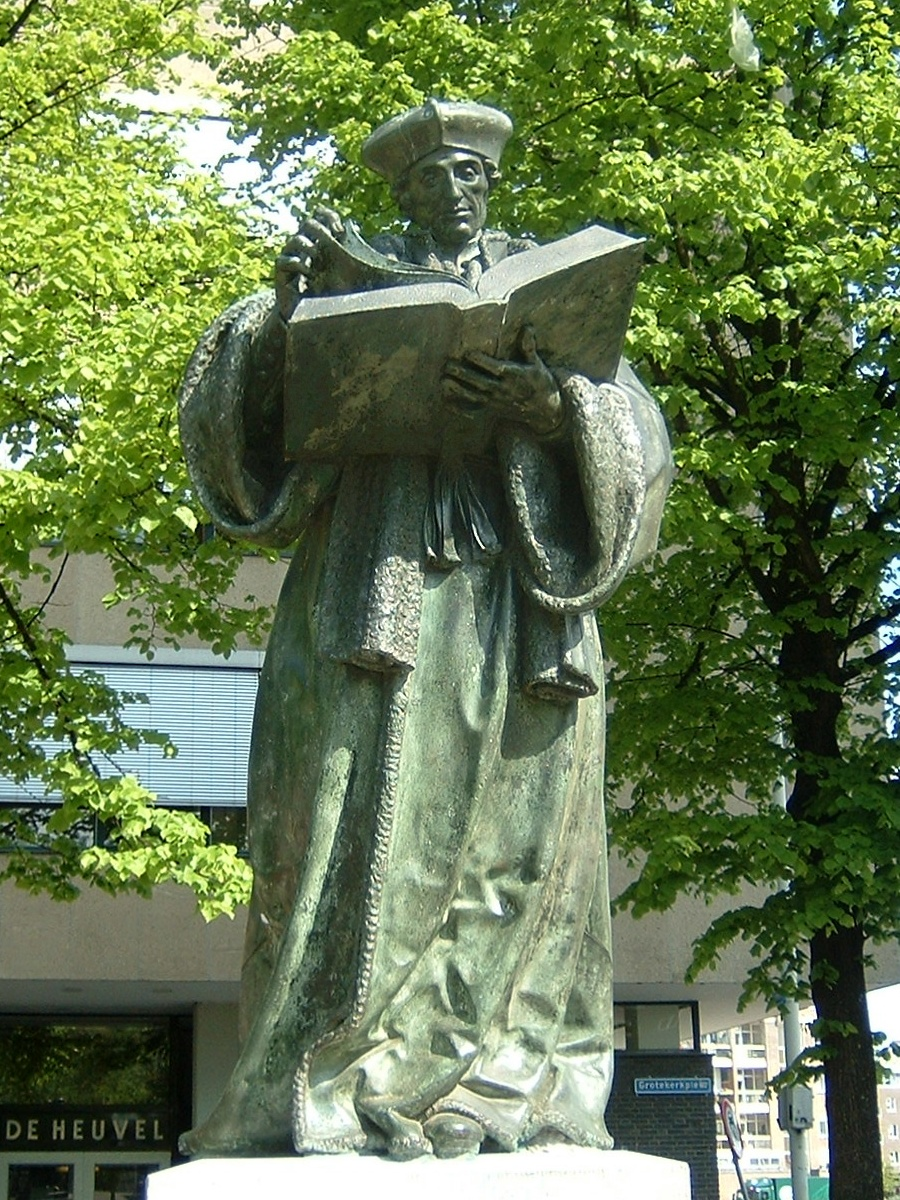
Statue of Erasmus in Rotterdam. Gilded bronze statue by Hendrick de Keyser (1622), replacing a stone (1557), and a wooden (1549).

The year of Erasmus's birth is unclear: in later life he calculated his age as if born in 1466, but frequently his remembered age at major events actually implies 1469. (This article currently gives 1466 as the birth year. To handle this disagreement, ages are given first based on 1469, then in parentheses based on 1466: e.g., "20 (or 23)".) Furthermore, many details of his early life must be gleaned from a fictionalized third-person account he wrote in 1516 (published in 1529) in a letter to a fictitious Papal secretary, Lambertus Grunnius ("Mr. Grunt").

His parents could not be legally married: his father, Gerard, was a Catholic priest who may have spent up to six years in the 1450s or 60s in Italy as a scribe and scholar. His mother was Margaretha Rogerius (Latinized form of Dutch surname Rutgers), the daughter of a doctor from Zevenbergen. She may have been Gerard's housekeeper. Although he was born out of wedlock, Erasmus was cared for by his parents, with a loving household and the best education, until their early deaths from the bubonic plague in 1483. His only sibling Peter might have been born in 1463, and some writers suggest Margaret was a widow and Peter was the half-brother of Erasmus; Erasmus on the other hand called him his brother.

Erasmus's own story, in the possibly forged 1524 Compendium vitae Erasmi was along the lines that his parents were engaged, with the formal marriage blocked by his relatives (presumably a young widow or unmarried mother with a child was not an advantageous match); his father went to Italy to study Latin and Greek, and the relatives misled Gerard that Margaretha had died, on which news grieving Gerard romantically took Holy Orders, only to find on his return that Margaretha was alive; many scholars dispute this account.

In 1471 his father became the vice-curate of the small town of Woerden (where young Erasmus may have attended the local vernacular school to learn to read and write) and in 1476 was promoted to vice-curate of Gouda.

Erasmus was given the highest education available to a young commoner of his day, in a series of private, monastic or semi-monastic schools. In 1476, at the age of 6 (or 9), his family moved to Gouda and he started at the school of Pieter Winckel, who later became his guardian (and, perhaps, squandered Erasmus and Peter's inheritance.) Historians who date his birth in 1466 have Erasmus in Utrecht at the choir school at this period.

In 1478, at the age of 9 (or 12), he and his older brother Peter were sent to one of the best Latin schools in the Netherlands, located at Deventer and owned by the chapter clergy of the Lebuïnuskerk (St. Lebuin's Church). (Note: This school was not run by the Brethren of the Common Life, but one of the teachers was a brother.) A notable previous student was Thomas à Kempis. Towards the end of his stay there the curriculum was renewed by the new principal of the school, Alexander Hegius, a correspondent of pioneering rhetorician Rudolphus Agricola. For the first time in Europe north of the Alps, Greek was taught at a lower level than a university and this is where he began learning it. His education there ended when plague struck the city about 1483, and his mother, who had moved to provide a home for her sons, died from the infection; then his father. Following the death of his parents, as well as 20 fellow students at his school, he moved back to his patria (Rotterdam?) where he was supported by Berthe de Heyden, a compassionate widow.

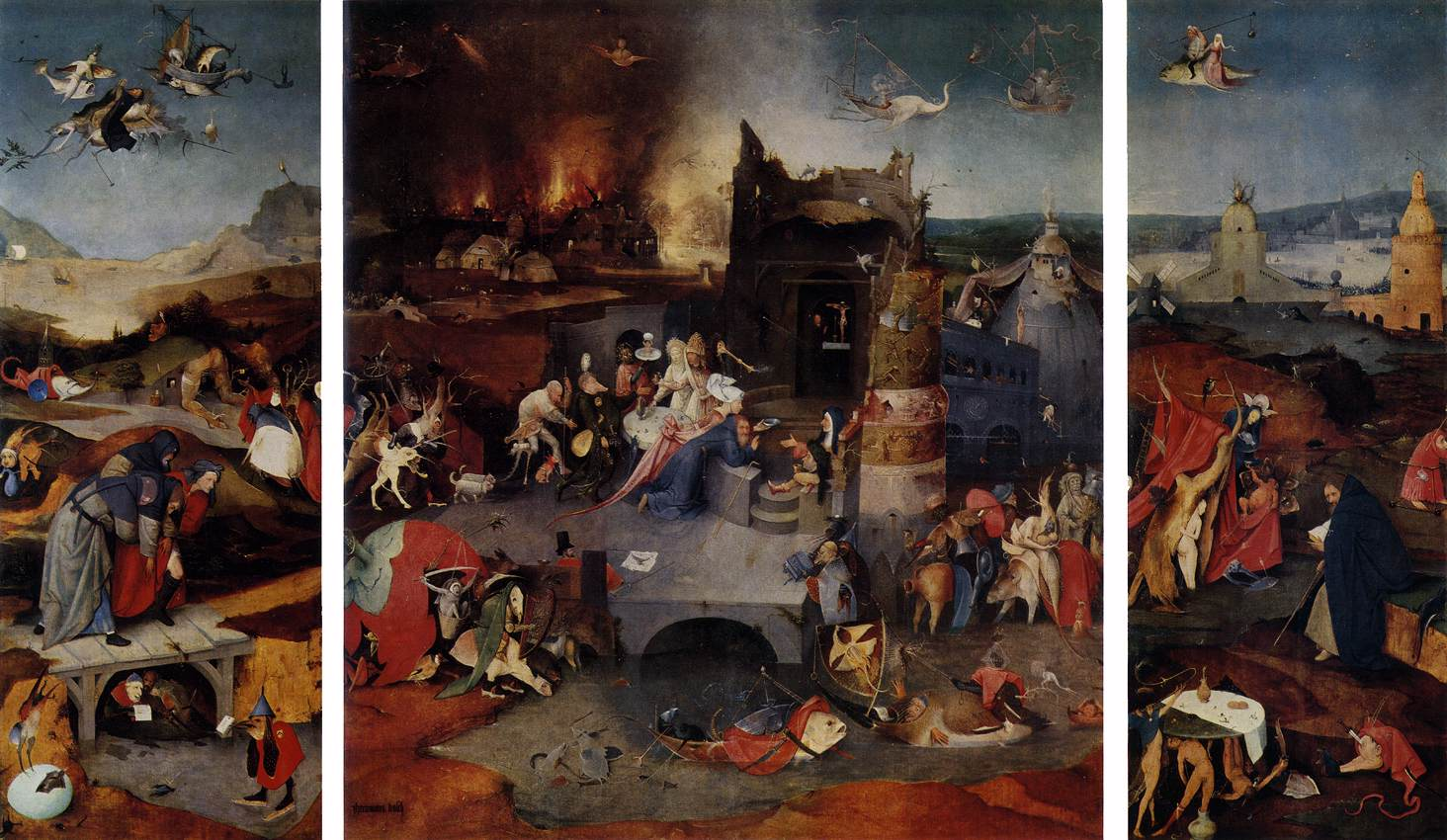
Hieronymous Bosch, Temptation of St Anthony, triptych (c. 1501), painted in 's-Hertogenbosch, later owned by his friend Damião de Gois

In 1484, around the age 14 (or 17), he and his brother went to a cheaper grammar school or seminary at 's-Hertogenbosch run by the Brethren of the Common Life: (Note: Painter Hieronymous Bosch lived nearby, on the marketplace, at this time.) Erasmus's Epistle to Grunnius (see above) satirises them as the "Collationary Brethren" who select and sort boys for monkhood. He was exposed there to the Devotio moderna movement and the Brethren's famous book The Imitation of Christ but resented the harsh rules and strict methods of the religious brothers and educators. The two brothers made an agreement that they would resist the clergy but attend the university; Erasmus longed to study in Italy, the birthplace of Latin, and have a degree from an Italian university. Instead, Peter left for the Augustinian canonry in Stein, which left Erasmus feeling betrayed. Around this time he wrote forlornly to his friend Elizabeth de Heyden "Shipwrecked am I, and lost, 'mid waters chill'." He suffered quartan fever for over a year. Eventually Erasmus moved to the same abbey as a postulant in or before 1487, around the age of 16 (or 19.)

=== Vows, ordination and canonry experience ===
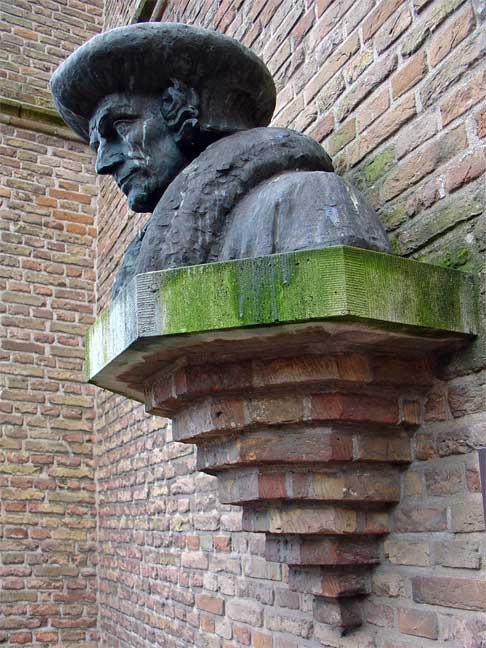
Bust by Hildo Krop (1950) in Gouda, where Erasmus spent his youth

Poverty had forced the sickly, bookish, teenaged orphan Erasmus into the consecrated life, entering the novitiate in 1487 at the canonry at rural Stein, very near Gouda, South Holland: the Chapter of Sion community (Note: Canons regular of St Augustine, Chapter of Sion (or Syon), Emmaus house, Stein (or Steyn).) largely borrowed its rule from the larger monkish Congregation of Windesheim who had historical associations with the Brethren of the Common Life, but also with the notable pastoral, mystical and anti-speculative post-scholastic theologians Jean Gerson and Gabriel Biel: positions associated also with Erasmus. In 1488–1490, the surrounding region was plundered badly by armies fighting the Squire Francis War of succession and then suffered a famine. Erasmus professed his vows as a Canon regular of St. Augustine (Note: This is a non-mendicant order of clerics which followed the looser Rule of St Augustine, who do not withdraw from the world, and who take a vow of Stability binding them to a House in addition to the usual Poverty (common life, simplicity), Chastity and Obedience. Erasmus described the Canons Regular as "an order midway between monks and (secular priests) [...] amphibians, like the beaver [...] and the crocodile". Also "for the so-called Canons formerly were not monks, and now they are an intermediate class: monks where it is an advantage to be so; not monks where it is not". The kind of world-involved, devout, scholarly, loyal, humanistic, non-monkish, non-mendicant, non-ceremonial, voluntaristic religious order without notions of spiritual perfection that may have suited Erasmus better arose soon after his death, perhaps in response to the ethos Erasmus shared: notably the Jesuits, Oratorians and subsequent congregations such as the Redemptorists. For the Ursalines, Barnabites, etc. "these associations were not conceived by their founders as 'religious orders', but as spiritual companies mostly composed of both lay and religious folk ... Similarly to the teachings of humanists like Erasmus and of the devotio moderna, these ... associations did not emphasise the institutional aspect of religious life.") there in late 1488 at age 19 (or 22).

Historian Fr. Aiden Gasquet later wrote: "One thing, however, would seem to be quite clear; he could never have had any vocation for the religious life. His whole subsequent history shows this unmistakably." But according to one Catholic biographer, Erasmus had a spiritual awakening at the monastery.

Certain abuses in religious orders were among the chief objects of his later calls to reform the Western Church from within, particularly coerced or tricked recruitment of immature boys (the fictionalised account in the Letter to Grunnius calls them "victims of Dominic and Francis and Benedict"): Erasmus felt he had belonged to this class, joining "voluntarily but not freely" and so considered himself, if not morally bound by his vows, certainly legally, socially and honour-bound to keep them, yet to look for his true vocation.

While at Stein, 18-(or 21-)year-old Erasmus formed what he called a "passionate attachment" (Latin: fervidos amores), with a fellow canon, Servatius Rogerus, (Note: Diarmaid MacCulloch has a footnote "There has been much modern embarrassment and obfuscation on Erasmus and Rogerus, but see the sensible comment in J. Huizinga, Erasmus of Rotterdam (London, 1952), pp. 11–12, and from Geoffrey Nutuall, Journal of Ecclesiastical History 26 (1975), 403" In Huizinga's view: "Out of the letters to Servatius there rises the picture of an Erasmus whom we shall never find again—a young man of more than feminine sensitiveness; of a languishing need for sentimental friendship. [...]This exuberant friendship accords quite well with the times and the person. [...] Sentimental friendships were as much in vogue in secular circles during the fifteenth century as towards the end of the eighteenth century. Each court had its pairs of friends, who dressed alike, and shared room, bed, and heart. Nor was this cult of fervent friendship restricted to the sphere of aristocratic life. It was among the specific characteristics of the devotio moderna.") and wrote a series of love letters (Note: However, note that such crushes or bromances may not have been scandalous at the time: the Cistercian Aelred of Rievaulx's influential book On Spiritual Friendship put intense adolescent and early-adult friendships between monks as natural and useful steps towards "spiritual friendships", following Augustine. The correct direction of passionate love was also a feature of the spirituality of the Victorine canons regular, notably in Richard of St Victor's On the Four Degrees of Violent Love Huizinga (p.12) notes "To observe one another with sympathy, to watch and note each other's inner life, was a customary and approved occupation among the Brethren of the Common Life and the Windesheim monks.") in which he called Rogerus "half my soul", (Note: Erasmus used similar expressions in letters to other friends at the time. D. F. S. Thomson found two other similar contemporary examples of humanist monks using similar florid idiom in their letters. Historian Julian Haseldine has noted that medieval monks used charged expressions of friendship with the same emotional content regardless of how well-known the person was to them: so this language was sometimes "instrumental" rather than "affective." However, in this case we have Erasmus's own attestation of the genuine rather than formal fondness.) writing that "it was not for the sake of reward or out of a desire for any favour that I have wooed you both unhappily and relentlessly. What is it then? Why, that you love him who loves you." (Note: Erasmus editor Harry Vredeveld argues that the letters are "surely expressions of true friendship", citing what Erasmus wrote in his Letter to Grunnius about an earlier teenage infatuation with a "Cantellius": "It is not uncommon at [that] age to conceive passionate attachments [fervidos amores] for some of your companions". However, he allows "That these same letters, which run the gamut of love's emotions, are undoubtedly also literary exercises—rhetorical progymnasmata—is by no means a contradiction of this.") This correspondence contrasts with the generally detached and much more restrained attitude he usually showed in his later life, though he had a capacity to form and maintain deep male friendships, (Note: But also a capacity to feel betrayal sharply, as with his brother Peter, "Cantellius", Aleander, and Dorp.) such as with More, Colet, and Ammonio. (Note: The biographer J.J. Mangan commented of his time living with Andrea Ammonio in England "to some extent Erasmus thereby realized the dream of his youth, which was to live together with some choice literary spirit with whom he might share his thoughts and aspiration".) No mentions or sexual accusations were ever made of Erasmus during his lifetime. His works notably praise moderate sexual desire in marriage between men and women.

He was ordained to the Catholic priesthood either on 25 April 1492, or 25 April 1495, at age 25 (or 28). (Note: 25 was the minimum age under canon law to be ordained a priest. However, Gouda church records do not support the 1492 year given by his first biographer, and 1495 has been suggested as more plausible. A man whose biological parents had never married could only become a priest by first joining a religious order or by receiving a papal dispensation, and could not hold a benefice without a dispensation.) Either way, he did not actively work as a choir priest for very long, though his many works on confession and penance suggests experience of dispensing them.

=== Disengagement ===
In 1493, his prior arranged for him to leave the Stein house and move to Brabant, (Note: Also in Cambrai diocese at the time may have been Europe's foremost composer, the priest Josquin des Prez. Erasmus wrote little about music, however he did in 1497 write a notable elergy for the composer Johannes Ockeghem Ergone conticuit, In Johannem Okegi, Musicorum principem, Naenia, who had been born and ordained in the Cambrai diocese, which was later set to music by Cambrai composer Johannes Lupi.) to take up the post of Latin Secretary to the ambitious Bishop of Cambrai, Henry of Bergen, on account of his great skill in Latin and his reputation as a man of letters. (Note: This was his entry to the European network of Latin secretaries, who were usually humanists, and so to their career path: a promising secretary could be appointed tutor to some aristocratic boy, when that boy reached power they were frequent kept on as a trusted counselor, and finally moved over to some dignified administrative role.) Following this, he went to Paris to study theology. His status as priest, Latinist and student, and his habit of being far away, afforded a measure of disengagement from the Stein canonry.

From 1500, he avoided returning to the canonry at Stein even insisting the diet and hours would kill him, (Note: Erasmus suffered severe food intolerances, including to fish, beer and many wines, which formed much of the diet of Northern European monks, and caused his antipathy to fasts. "My heart is Catholic, but my stomach is Lutheran." (Epistles)) though he did stay with other Augustinian communities and at monasteries of other orders in his travels. Rogerus, who became prior at Stein in 1504, and Erasmus corresponded over the years, with Rogerus demanding Erasmus return after his studies were complete. Nevertheless, the library of the canonry (Note: The canonry burnt down in 1549 and the canons moved to Gouda.) ended up with by far the largest collection of Erasmus's publications in the Gouda region.

In 1505, Pope Julius II granted a dispensation from the vow of poverty to the extent of allowing Erasmus to hold certain benefices, and from the control and habit of his order, though he remained a priest and, formally, an Augustinian canon regular (Note: Dispensed from his obligations "by the constitutions and ordinances, also by statutes and customs of the monastery of Stein in Holland", Erasmus continued to report occasionally to the prior, who disputed the validity of the 1505 dispensation.) the rest his life. In 1517, Pope Leo X granted legal dispensations for Erasmus's defects of natality (Note: Undispensed illegitimacy had various effects under canon law: if a man's biological parents had never married, he could not be ordained a secular priest, unless he became a canon or regular monk, or to hold benefices; but any or all of these disabilities could be removed by a papal dispensation. This canon law, in effect since the Council of Poitiers (1078), was intended to prevent kings appointing their illegitimate children as abbots and bishops. In practice, dispensations were frequently given: Erasmus's student, the teenage Alexander Stewart was the illegitimate child of the Scottish king and, by papal dispensation, Archbishop of St Andrews.) and confirmed the previous dispensation, allowing the 48-(or 51-)year-old his independence but still, as a canon, capable of holding office as a prior or abbot. Indeed, in 1535, incoming Pope Paul III provided a letter, never used, appointing him Provost of the "Canons of Deventer" (i.e., the semi-monastic Brethren of the Common Life chapter, which had long resisted titles such as Provost, and/or perhaps the canons of the Grote or Lebuïnuskerk): this may also have been related to his intended return to the Low Countries. In 1525, Pope Clement VII granted, for health reasons, a dispensation to eat meat and dairy in Lent and on fast days.

In 1530, Ferdinand I, then Archduke of Austria and King of the Romans, wrote to the Freiburg town council to remove obstacles to Erasmus drawing up a will, and Charles V issued letters patent granting him authority to dispose of his goods by testament.

Netherlands
France
Italy
England
Brabant
Basel
Freiburg
Brabant
Brabant
England
Brabant
England
France
Basel
Basel
England
Basel
England
Basel
│
1465
│
1475
│
1485
│
1495
│
1505
│
1515
│
1525
│
1535
Life timeline

=== Travels ===
Erasmus travelled widely and regularly, for reasons of poverty, "escape" from his Stein canonry (to Cambrai), education (to Paris, Turin), escape from the sweating sickness plague (to Orléans), employment (to England), searching libraries for manuscripts, writing (Brabant), royal counsel (Cologne), patronage, tutoring and chaperoning (North Italy), networking (Rome), seeing books through printing in person (Paris, Venice, Louvain, Basel), and avoiding the persecution of religious fanatics (to Freiburg). He enjoyed horseback riding.

==== Paris ====
In 1495 with Bishop Henry's consent and a stipend, Erasmus went on to study at the University of Paris in the Collège de Montaigu, a centre of reforming zeal, (Note: Subsequent students included Ignatius of Loyola, Noël Béda, Jean Calvin, and John Knox.) under the direction of the ascetic Jan Standonck, of whose rigors he complained. The university was then the chief seat of Scholastic learning but already coming under the influence of Renaissance humanism. For instance, Erasmus became an intimate friend of an Italian humanist Publio Fausto Andrelini, poet and "professor of humanity" in Paris, and part of the "rhetorical-grammatical-poetical nexus" flourishing there.

His health failed in the first year. After returning to Bergen and Stein to recuperate, Erasmus returned to Paris, and rented a room at the English boarding house (whose propriétaire tolerated his tardy or partial payments) where he tutored wealthy boarders, notably Thomas Grey (future Marquess of Dorset, and grandfather of Lady Jane Grey.)

During this time, Erasmus developed a deep aversion to exclusive or excessive Aristotelianism and Scholasticism and started finding work as a tutor/chaperone to visiting English and Scottish aristocrats, most importantly in his life William Blount, 4th Baron Mountjoy. There is no record of him graduating.

==== First visit to England (1499–1500) ====
Erasmus stayed in England at least three times. (Note: Some of these visits were interrupted by trips back to Europe.) In between he had periods studying in Paris, Orléans, Leuven and other cities.

In 1499 he was invited to England by Blount, who offered to accompany him on his trip to England. His six months in England was fruitful in the making of lifelong friendships with the leaders of English thought in the days of King Henry VIII. He reported gaining new skills important in his future: becoming "a better horse-man, and a tolerable courtier."

During his first visit to England in 1499, he stayed for two months at the University of Oxford, at St Mary's College, the college for Augustinian canons, where he befriended the leading Greek scholars Thomas Linacre, William Grocyn and William Lily.

Erasmus was particularly impressed by the Bible teaching of the humanist John Colet, who pursued a preaching style more akin to the church fathers than the Scholastics. Through the influence of Colet, his interests turned abruptly towards the evangelical and patristic theology and biblical philology that occupied the second half of his life. Other distinctive features of Colet's thought that may have influenced Erasmus are his pacifism, reform-mindedness, anti-Scholasticism and pastoral esteem for the sacrament of Confession. This prompted Erasmus, upon his return from England to Paris, to intensively study the Greek language, which would enable him to study patristic exegesis and the New Testament texts on a more profound level.

Erasmus also became fast friends with Thomas More, a young law student considering becoming a monk, whose thought (e.g., on conscience and equity) had been influenced by 14th century French theologian Jean Gerson, and whose intellect had been developed by his powerful patron Cardinal John Morton (d. 1500) who had famously attempted reforms of English monasteries.

Erasmus left London with a full purse from his generous friends, to allow him to complete his studies. However, he had been provided with bad legal advice by his friends: the English customs officials confiscated all the gold and silver, leaving him with nothing except a night fever that lasted several months.

==== France and Brabant ====
Following his first trip to England, Erasmus returned first to poverty in Paris, where he started to compile the Adagia for his students, then to Orléans to escape the plague, and then to semi-monastic life, scholarly studies and writing in France, notably at the Benedictine Abbey of Saint Bertin at St Omer (1501,1502) where he wrote the initial version of the Enchiridion (Handbook of the Christian Knight). A particular influence was his encounter in 1501 with Jean (Jehan) Vitrier, a radical Franciscan who consolidated Erasmus's thoughts against excessive valorisation of monasticism, ceremonialism (Note: According to theologian Thomas Scheck, "In the fuller context of the Ratio the 'ceremonies' Erasmus criticizes are not the liturgical rites of the Church, but the special devotions and prescriptions added to them, particularly those related to food and clothing, which became binding in particular religious orders and more generally, under threat of excommunication and even eternal punishment.") and fasting (Note: "We ﬁnd in the New Testament that fasting was observed by Christians and praised by the apostles, but I do not remember reading that it was prescribed with certain rites. These things are not mentioned so that any ceremonies that the church has instituted concerning clothing, fasting or similar matters should be despised, but to show that Christ and his apostles were more concerned with things pertaining to salvation.") in a kind of conversion experience, and introduced him to Origen.

In 1502, Erasmus went to Brabant, ultimately to the university at Louvain. In 1504 he was hired by the leaders of the Brabantian "Provincial States" to deliver one of his few public speeches, a very long formal panegyric for Philip "the Fair", Duke of Burgundy and later King of Castille: the first half being the conventional extravagant praise, but the second half being a strong treatment of the miseries of war, the need for neutrality and conciliation (with the neighbours France and England), and the excellence of peaceful rulers: that real courage in a leader was not to wage war but to put a bridle on greed, etc. This was later published as Panegyricus. Erasmus then returned to Paris in 1504.

==== Second visit to England (1505–1506) ====
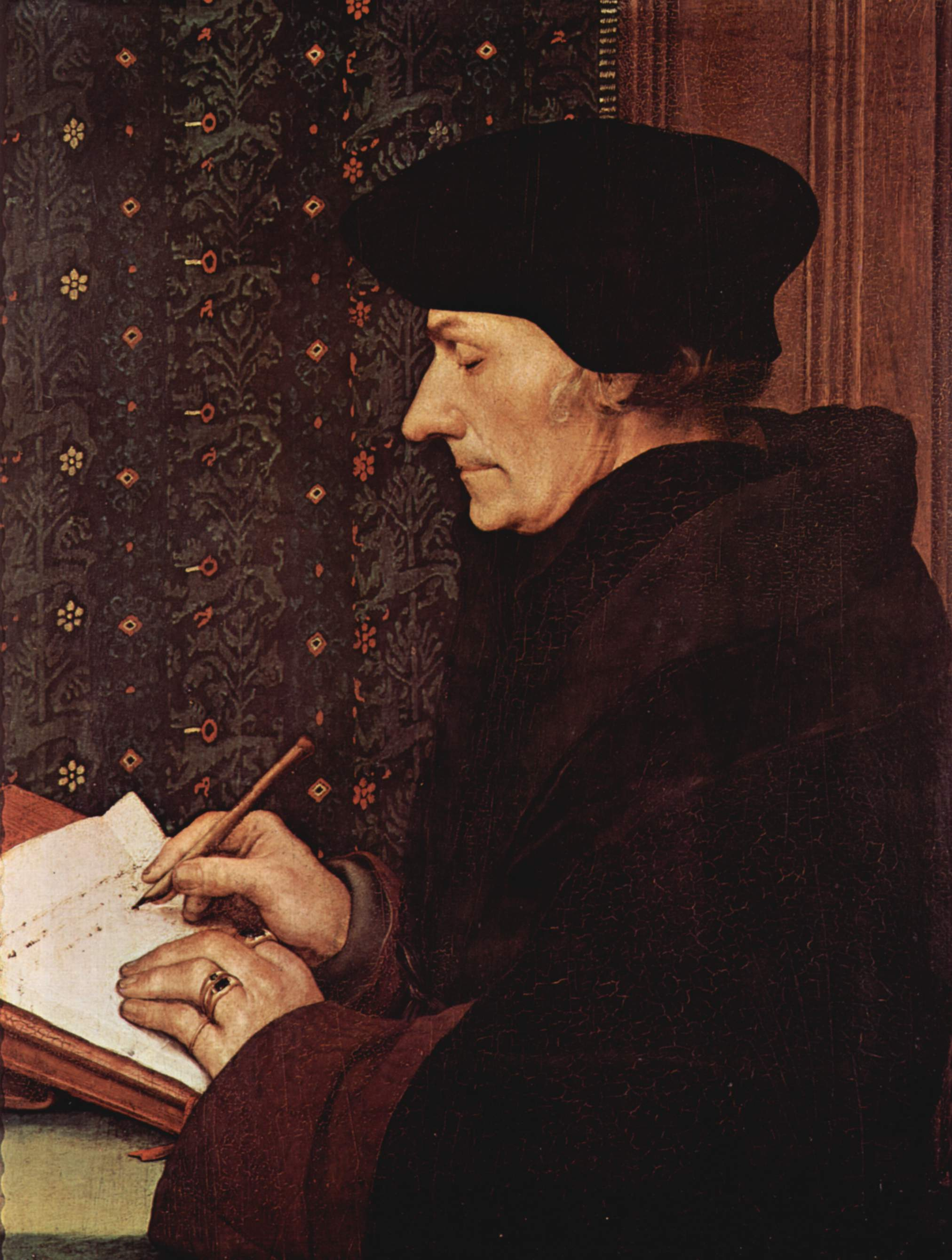
Erasmus by Hans Holbein the Younger. Louvre, Paris

For Erasmus's second visit, he spent over a year staying at recently married Thomas More's house, now a lawyer and Member of Parliament, honing his translation skills.

Erasmus preferred to live the life of an independent scholar and made a conscious effort to avoid any actions or formal ties that might inhibit his individual freedom. In England Erasmus was approached with prominent offices but he declined them all, until King Henry VII himself offered his support. He was inclined, but eventually did not accept and longed for a stay in Italy.

==== Italy ====
In 1506 he was able to accompany and tutor the sons of the personal physician of the English King through Italy to Bologna.

His discovery en route at Park Abbey of Lorenzo Valla's New Testament Notes was a major event in his career and prompted Erasmus to study the New Testament using philology.

In 1506 they passed through Turin and he arranged to be awarded the degree of Doctor of Sacred Theology (Sacra Theologia, the highest theological degree, conferring the ius docendi right to teach theology anywhere), from the University of Turin per saltum at age 37 (or 40). Erasmus stayed tutoring in Bologna for a year; (Note: He made friends with aristocrat Mark Laurin, future Dean of Bruges.) in the winter, Erasmus was present when Pope Julius II entered victorious into the conquered Bologna which he had besieged before.

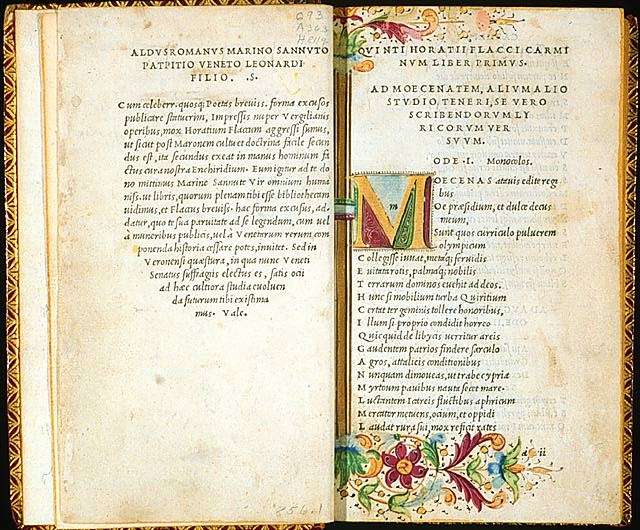
Book printed and illuminated at the Aldine Press, Venice (1501): Horace, Works

Erasmus travelled on to Venice, working on an expanded version of his Adagia at the Aldine Press of the famous printer Aldus Manutius, advised him which manuscripts to publish, and was an honorary member of the graecophone Aldine "New Academy" (Greek: Neakadêmia (Νεακαδημία)). From Aldus he learned the in-person workflow that made him productive at Froben: making last-minute changes, and immediately checking and correcting printed page proofs as soon as the ink had dried. Aldus wrote that Erasmus could do twice as much work in a given time as any other man he had ever met.

In 1507, according to his letters, he studied advanced Greek in Padua with the Venetian natural philosopher, Giulio Camillo. He found employment tutoring and escorting Scottish nobleman Alexander Stewart, the 24-year-old Archbishop of St Andrews, through Padua, Florence, and Siena, (Note: He movingly remembers later how Alexander would play the monochord, recorder or lute in the afternoon after studies.) Erasmus made it to Rome in 1509, visiting three times and seeking the acquaintance of some notable librarians and cardinals, but having a less active association with Italian scholars; one notable minor friendship was with Cardinal Giovanni di Lorenzo de' Medici who later became Pope Leo X and a leading supporter of Erasmus's Biblical program.

In 1509, William Warham, Archbishop of Canterbury, and Lord Mountjoy lured him back to England, now ruled by what was hoped would be a wise and benevolent king (Henry VIII) educated by humanists. Warham and Mountjoy sent Erasmus £10 to cover his expenses on the journey. On his trip over the Alps via Splügen Pass, and down the Rhine toward England, Erasmus began to compose The Praise of Folly.

==== Third visit to England (1510–1515) ====
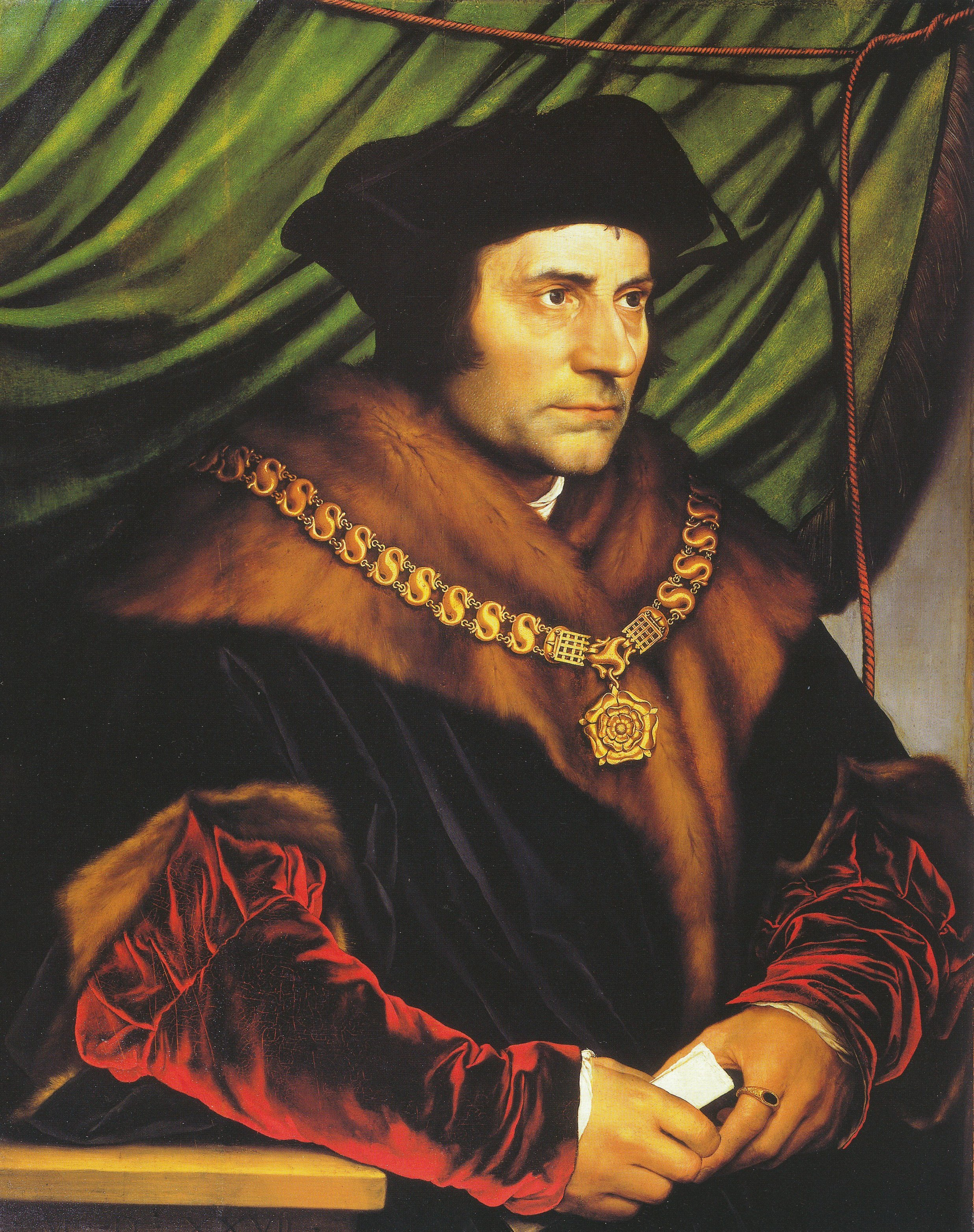
Sir Thomas More, by Hans Holbein the Younger. According to their friend Richard Whitford, Erasmus and More were "so alike in wit, manners, affections, and pursuits, that no pair of twins could be found more so."

In 1510, Erasmus arrived at More's bustling house, was confined to bed to recover from his recurrent illness, and wrote The Praise of Folly, which was to be a best-seller. More was at that time the undersheriff of the City of London. His wife Jane died, aged 21, in 1511, and More quickly remarrried.

After his glorious reception in Italy, Erasmus had returned broke and jobless, (Note: Even in good times, Erasmus had a "frequent inability to understand the details of his own finances" which caused him disappointment and suspicion. His finances as late as 1530 have been described as "bewilderingly complicated" with multiple small income sources being managed with varying degrees of promptness by different associates in different countries.) with strained relations with former friends and benefactors on the continent, and he regretted leaving Italy, despite being horrified by papal warfare. There is a gap in his usually voluminous correspondence: his so-called "two lost years", perhaps due to self-censorship of dangerous or disgruntled opinions; he shared lodgings with his friend Andrea Ammonio (Latin secretary to Mountjoy, and the next year, to Henry VIII, who had been lodging in Thomas More's large and welcoming household but did not get on with the new wife) provided at the London Austin Friars' compound, skipping out after a disagreement with the friars over rent that caused bad blood. (Note: Erasmus claimed the blind poet laureate friar Bernard André, the former tutor of Prince Arthur, had promised to cover the rent. It may also show the practical difficulty of being dispensed from wearing the habit of his order without being entirely dispensed from his vow of poverty: indeed, Erasmus had said his order of Augustinian Canons regular were priests when that suited and monks when that suited.)

He assisted his friend John Colet by authoring Greek textbooks and securing members of staff for the newly established St Paul's School and was in contact when Colet gave his notorious 1512 Convocation sermon which called for a reformation of ecclesiastical affairs. At Colet's instigation, Erasmus started work on De copia.

In 1511, the University of Cambridge's chancellor, John Fisher, arranged for Erasmus to be (or to study to prepare to be) the Lady Margaret's Professor of Divinity, though whether he actually was accepted for it or took it up is contested by historians. He studied and taught Greek and researched and lectured on Jerome. (Note: He wrote to Servatius Rogerus, the prior at Stein, to justify his jobs: "I do not aim at becoming rich, so long as I possess just enough means to provide for my health and free time for my studies and to ensure that I am a burden to none.")

Erasmus mainly stayed at Queens' College while lecturing at the university, between 1511 and 1515. (Note: It is reported that the commission of theologians Henry VIII assembled to identify the errors of Luther was made up of three of Erasmus's former students: Henry Bullock, Humphrey Walkden and John Watson.) Erasmus's rooms were located in the "I" staircase of Old Court. Despite a chronic shortage of money, he succeeded in mastering Greek by an intensive, day-and-night study of three years, taught by Thomas Linacre, continuously begging in letters that his friends send him books and money for teachers.

Erasmus suffered from poor health and was especially concerned with heating, clean air, ventilation, draughts, fresh food and unspoiled wine: he complained about the draughtiness of English buildings. He complained that Queens' College could not supply him with enough decent wine (wine was the Renaissance medicine for gallstones, from which Erasmus suffered). As Queens' was an unusually humanist-leaning institution in the 16th century, Queens' College Old Library still houses many first editions of Erasmus's publications, many of which were acquired during that period by bequest or purchase, including Erasmus's New Testament translation, which is signed by friend and Polish religious reformer Jan Łaski.

By this time More was a judge on the poorman's equity court (Master of Requests) and a Privy Counsellor.

Concerned by the outbreaks of plague at Cambridge, ill from gallstones, and worried about the advent of war and inflation, Erasmus left Cambridge and then England.

==== Flanders and Brabant ====
His residence at Leuven, where he lectured at the University, exposed Erasmus to much criticism from those ascetics, academics and clerics hostile to the principles of literary and religious reform to which he was devoting his life. In 1514, en route to Basel, he made the acquaintance of Hermannus Buschius, Ulrich von Hutten and Johann Reuchlin who introduced him to the Hebrew language in Mainz. In 1514, he suffered a fall from his horse and injured his back.

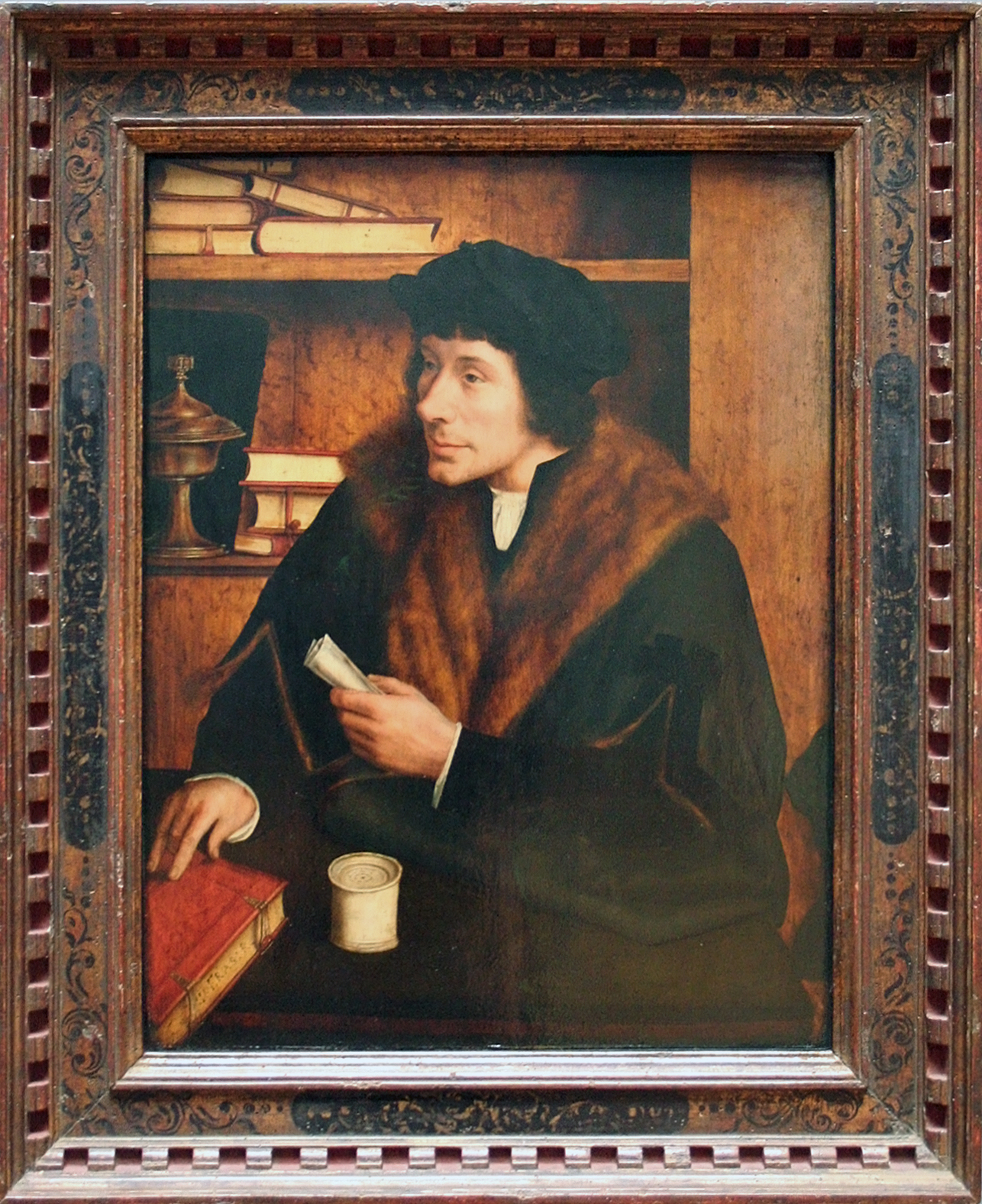
Quinten Matsys – Portrait of Peter Gillis or Gilles (1517), half of a diptych with a portrait of Erasmus below, painted as a gift from them for Thomas More.

Erasmus may have made several other short visits to England or English territory while living in Brabant. Happily for Erasmus, More and Tunstall were posted in Brussels or Antwerp on government missions around 1516, More for six months, Tunstall for longer. Their circle include Pieter Gillis of Antwerp, in whose house Thomas More's wrote Utopia (1516) with Erasmus's encouragement, (Note: Historians have speculated that Erasmus passed on to More an early version of Bartholome de las Casas' Memoria which More used for Utopia, due to 33 specific similarities of ideas, and that the fictional character Raphael Hythloday is de las Casas. Coincidentally, de las Casas' nemesis Sepúlveda, arguing for the natural slavery of American Indians, had previously been Erasmus's opponent as well, initially supporting the anti-decadence of Erasmus's Ciceronians but then finding heresy in his translations and works. Another theory is that Raphael Hythloday is Erasmus himself.) Erasmus editing and perhaps even contributing fragments. His old Cambridge friend Richard Sampson was vicar general running the nearby diocese of Tournai, recently under English control and governed by his former pupil William Blount.

In 1516, Erasmus accepted an honorary position as a Councillor to Charles V with an annuity of 200 guilders (over US$100,000), rarely paid, and tutored Charles' brother, the teenage future Holy Roman Emperor Ferdinand of Hapsburg.

In 1516, Erasmus published the first edition of his scholarly Latin-Greek New Testament with annotations, his complete works of Jerome, and The Education of a Christian Prince (Institutio principis Christiani) for Charles and Ferdinand.

In 1517, he supported the foundation at the university of the Collegium Trilingue for the study of Hebrew, Latin, and Greek—after the model of Cisneros' College of the Three Languages at the University of Alcalá—financed by his late friend Hieronymus van Busleyden's will. On being asked by Jean Le Sauvage, former Chancellor of Brabant and now Chancellor of Burgundy, Erasmus wrote The Complaint of Peace.

In 1517, his great friend Ammonio died in England of the Sweating Sickness. In 1518, Erasmus was diagnosed with the plague; despite the danger, he was taken in and cared for in the home of his Flemish friend and publisher Dirk Martens in Antwerp for a month and recovered.

By 1518, he reported to Paulus Bombasius that his income was over 300 ducats (Note: Italian gold florins and Venetian gold ducats, Dutch silver guilders had similar values. However, there is no single modern equivalent exchange rate.) per year (over US$150,000) without including patronage. By 1522 he reported his annual income as 400 gold florins (over US$200,000).

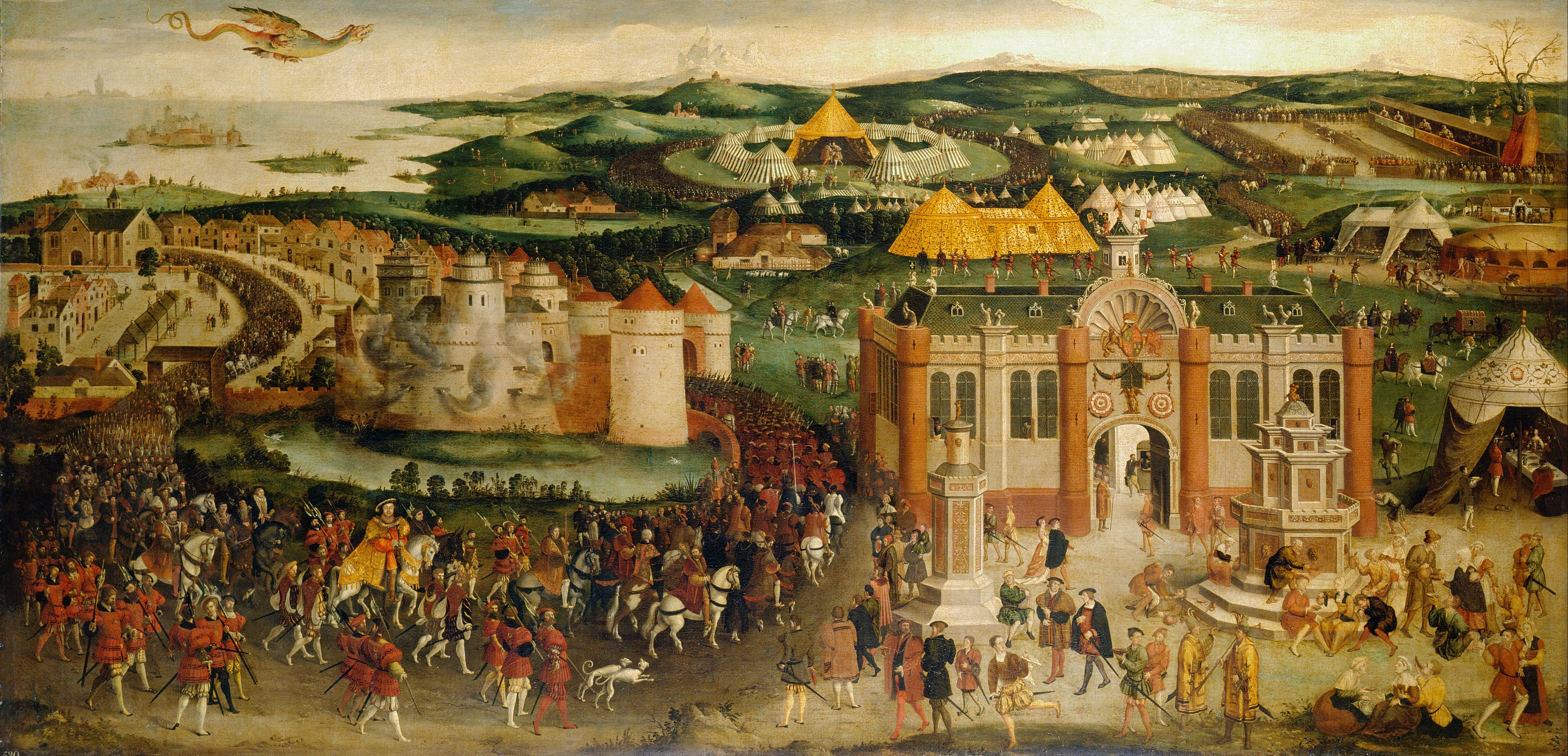
The Field of the Cloth of Gold, showing King Henry VIII arriving at left. The figure on horseback with raised sword ahead of Henry VIII is Thomas Grey, 2nd Marquess of Dorset, a former pupil of Erasmus.

In 1520 he was present at the Field of the Cloth of Gold with Guillaume Budé, probably his last meetings with Thomas More and William Warham. His friend Richard Pace gave the main sermon to the kings. His friends and former students and old correspondents were the incoming political elite, and he had risen with them. (Note: By 1524, his disciples included, in his words, "the (Holy Roman) Emperor, the Kings of England, France, and Denmark, Prince Ferdinand of Germany, the Cardinal of England, the Archbishop of Canterbury, and more princes, more bishops, more learned and honourable men than I can name, not only in England, Flanders, France, and Germany, but even in Poland and Hungary...")

Following the Edict of Worms, which Martin Luther refused to accept, Erasmus came under attack from the theological faculty because of his neutral stance in the conflict. He subsequently took up residence in the house known as De Swaene in Anderlecht, where he wrote his famous 21 letters and numerous biblical studies. On 28 October, he left Anderlecht in order to avoid the ongoing theological disputes.

==== Basel (1521–1529) ====
Desiderius Erasmus dictating to his ammenuensis Gilbert Cousin or Cognatus. From a book by Cousin, and itself claimed to be based on fresco in Cousin's house in Nozeroy, Burgundy. Engraving possibly by Claude Luc.

From 1514, Erasmus regularly travelled to Basel to coordinate the printing of his books with Froben. He developed a lasting association with the great Basel publisher Johann Froben and later his son Hieronymus Froben (Erasmus's godson) who together published over 200 works with Erasmus, working with expert scholar-correctors who went on to illustrious careers.

His initial interest in Froben's operation was aroused by his discovery of the printer's folio edition of the Adagiorum Chiliades tres (Adagia) (1513). Froben's work was notable for using the new Roman type (rather than blackletter) and Aldine-like Italic and Greek fonts, as well as elegant layouts using borders and fancy capitals; Hans Holbein the Younger cut several woodblock capitals for Erasmus's editions. The printing of many his books was supervised by his Alsatian friend, the Greek scholar Beatus Rhenanus. (Note: Rhenanus shared many humanist contacts from Paris and Strassburg: a former student of Andrelini, friend of the Amerbach family, colleague of Sebastian Brant etc. He had learned printing in Paris with Robert Estienne. He was a mentor of Martin Bucer, who further developed several of Erasmus's ideas.)

In 1521 he settled in Basel. He was weary of the controversies and hostility at Louvain, and feared being dragged further into the Lutheran controversy. He agreed to be the Froben press' literary superintendent writing dedications and prefaces for an annuity and profit share. Apart from Froben's production team, he had his own household (Note: Froben had bought Erasmus his own house "Zur alten Treu" in 1521 and fitted it with Erasmus's required fireplace.) with a formidable housekeeper, stable of horses, and up to eight boarders or paid servants who acted as assistants, correctors, amanuenses, dining companions, international couriers, and carers. It was his habit to sit at times by a ground-floor window, to make it easier to see and be seen by strolling humanists for chatting.

In collaboration with Froben and his team, the scope and ambition of Erasmus's Annotations, Erasmus's long-researched project of philological notes of the New Testament along the lines of Valla's Adnotations, had grown to also include a lightly revised Latin Vulgate, then the Greek text, then several edifying essays on methodology, then a highly revised Vulgate—all bundled as his Novum testamentum omne and pirated individually throughout Europe— then finally his amplified Paraphrases.

In 1522, Erasmus's compatriot, former teacher (c. 1502) and friend from the University of Louvain unexpectedly became Pope Adrian VI, (Note: Adrian's election was engineered by reformer Cardinal Thomas Cajetan, the leading Thomist of his age, who had become a friendly correspondent of Erasmus and had moved to bibliocentrism, progressively producing his own commentaries on the New Testament and most of the Old. Erasmus was initially sceptical of Cajetan, blaming him for taking a too-hard line against Luther; however, he was won over in 1521 after reading Cajetan's works on the Eucharist, Confession and invocation of the saints. In 1530, Cajetan proposed that concessions be made to Germany to allow communion under both kinds and married clergy, in full sympathy with Erasmus's spirit of mediation.) after having served as Regent (and/or Grand Inquisitor) of Spain for six years. Like Erasmus and Luther, he had been influenced by the Brethren of the Common Life. He tried to entice Erasmus to Rome. His reforms of the Roman Curia which he hoped would meet the objections of many Lutherans were stymied (partly because the Holy See was broke), though re-worked at the Council of Trent, and he died in 1523.

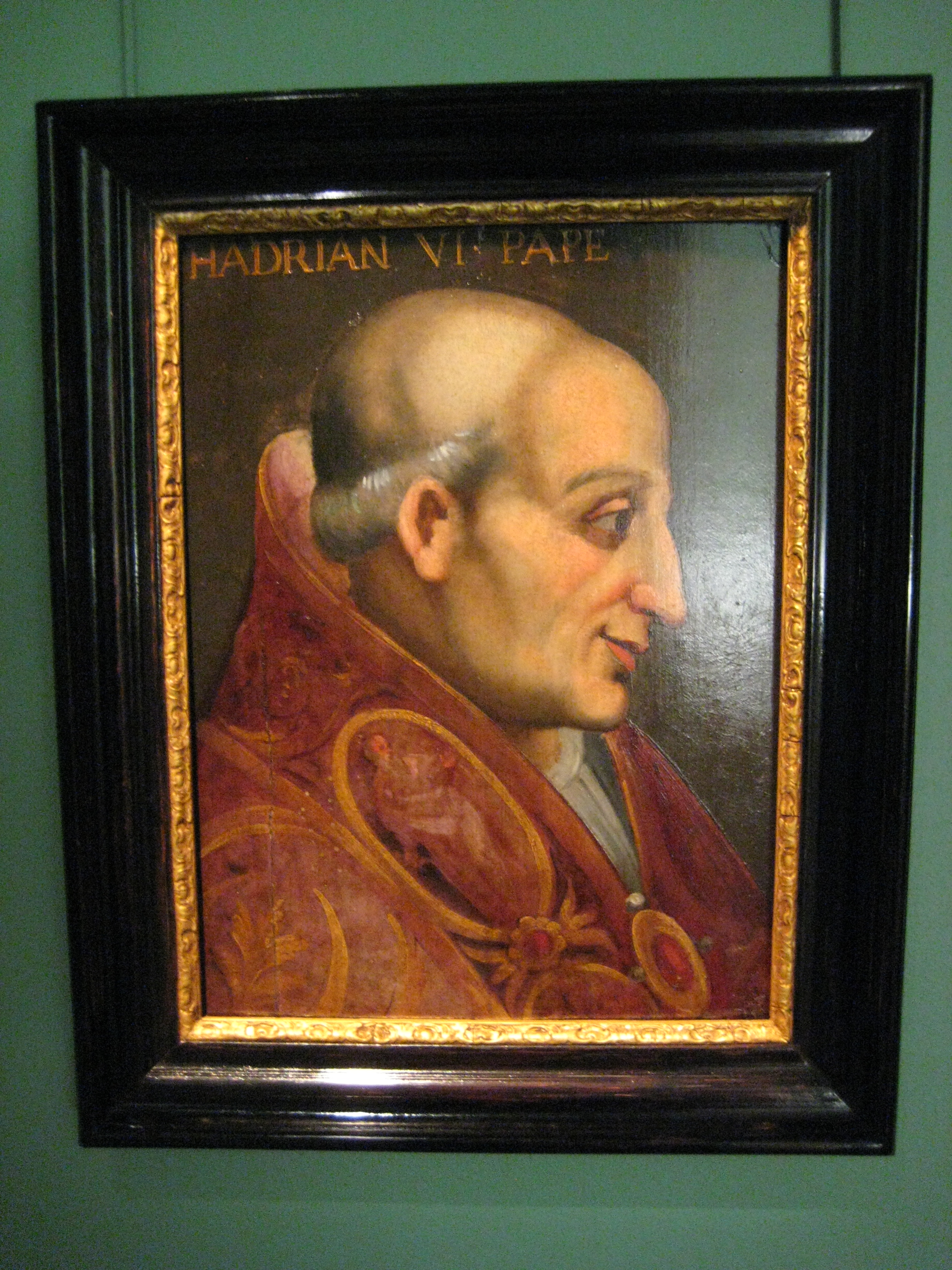
Pope Adrian VI

As the popular and nationalist responses to Luther gathered momentum, the social disorders, which Erasmus dreaded and Luther disassociated himself from, began to appear, including the German Peasants' War (1524–1525), the Anabaptist insurrections in Germany and in the Low Countries, iconoclasm, and the radicalisation of peasants across Europe. If these were the outcomes of reform, Erasmus was thankful that he had kept out of it. Yet he was ever more bitterly accused of having started the whole "tragedy" (as Erasmus dubbed the matter).

In 1523, he provided financial support to the impoverished and disgraced former Latin Secretary of Antwerp Cornelius Grapheus, on his release from the newly introduced Inquisition. In 1525, a former student of Erasmus who had served at Erasmus's father's former church at Woerden, Jan de Bakker (Pistorius) was the first priest to be executed as a heretic in the Netherlands. In 1529, his French translator and friend Louis de Berquin was burnt in Paris, following his condemnation as an anti-Rome heretic by the Sorbonne theologians.

==== Freiburg (1529–1535) ====
Following sudden, violent, iconoclastic rioting in early 1529 led by Œcolampadius his former assistant, in which elected Catholic councilmen were deposed, the city of Basel definitely adopted the Reformation—finally banning the Catholic Mass on 1 April 1529.

Erasmus, in company with other Basel Catholic priests including Bishop Augustin Mair, left Basel on 13 April 1529 (Note: Prominent reformers like Oecolampadius urged him to stay. However, Campion, Erasmus and Switzerland, op. cit., p. 26, says that Œcolampadius wanted to drive Erasmus from the city.) and departed by ship to the Catholic university town of Freiburg im Breisgau to be under the protection of his former student, Archduke Ferdinand of Austria. Erasmus wrote somewhat dramatically to Thomas More of his frail condition at the time: "I preferred to risk my life rather than appear to approve a programme like theirs. There was some hope of a return to moderation."

In Spring early 1530 Erasmus was bedridden for three months with an intensely painful infection, likely carbunculosis, that, unusually for him, left him too ill to work. He declined to attend the Diet of Augsburg to which both the Bishop of Augsburg and the Papal legate Campeggio had invited him, and he expressed doubt on non-theological grounds, to Campeggio and Melanchthon, that reconciliation was then possible: he wrote to Campeggio, "I can discern no way out of this enormous tragedy unless God suddenly appears like a deus ex machina and changes the hearts of men"; and later, "What upsets me is not so much their teaching, especially Luther's, as the fact that, under the pre-text of the gospel, I see a class of men emerging whom I find repugnant from every point of view."

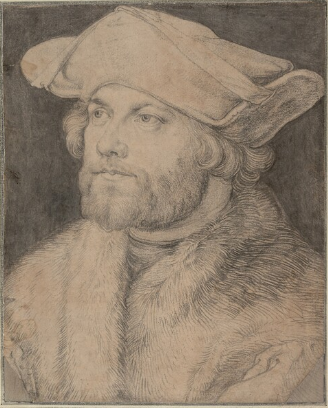
Damião de Góis

He stayed for two years on the top floor of the Whale House, then following another rent dispute (Note: He spent the first two years in Freiburg as a guest of the city in the unfinished mansion Haus zum Walfisch and was indignant when an attempt was made to charge back-rent: he paid this rent, and that of another refugee from Basel in his house, his fellow Augustinian Canon Bishop Augustin Mair, the humanist preacher who had led the efforts in Basel to resist Œcolampadius.) bought and refurbished a house of his own, where he took in scholar/assistants as table-boarders such as Cornelius Grapheus' friend Damião de Góis, some of them fleeing persecution.

Despite increasing frailty (Note: His arthritic gout kept him housebound and unable to write: "Even on Easter Day I said mass in my bedroom." Letter to Nicolaus Olahus (1534)) Erasmus continued to work productively, notably on a new magnum opus, his manual on preaching Ecclesiastes, and his small book on preparing for death. His boarder for five months, the Portuguese scholar/diplomat Damião de Góis, worked on his lobbying on the plight of the Sámi in Sweden and on the Ethiopian church, and stimulated Erasmus's increasing awareness of foreign missions. (Note: De Góis then proceeded to Padua, meeting with the humanist cardinals Bembo and Sadeleto, and with Ignatius of Loyola. He had previously dined with Luther and Melanchthon, and met Bucer.)

There are no extant letters between More and Erasmus from the start of More's period as Lord Chancellor until his resignation (1529–1532), almost to the day. Erasmus wrote several important non-political works under the surprising patronage of Thomas Bolyn: his Ennaratio triplex in Psalmum XXII or Triple Commentary on Psalm 23 (1529); his catechism to counter Luther Explanatio Symboli or A Playne and Godly Exposition or Declaration of the Commune Crede (1533) which sold out in three hours at the Frankfurt Book Fair; and Praeparatio ad mortem or Preparation for Death (1534), which would be one of Erasmus's most popular and most hijacked works. (Note: The last was released at the time of Henry VIII and Anne Bolyn's wedding; Erasmus appended a statement that indicated he opposed the marriage. Erasmus outlived Anne and her brother by two months.)

=== Fates of friends ===
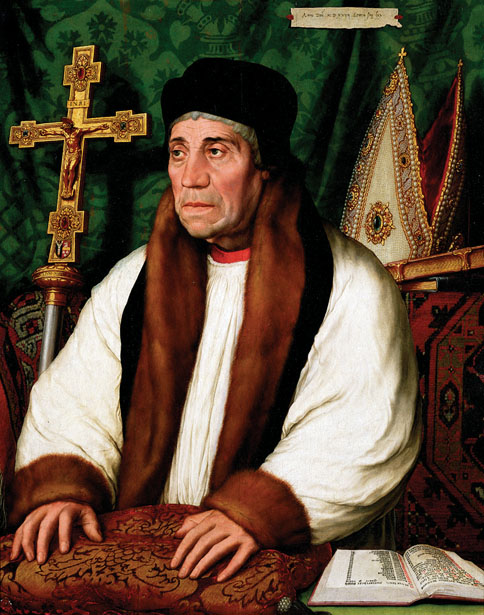
William Warham, Archbishop of Canterbury

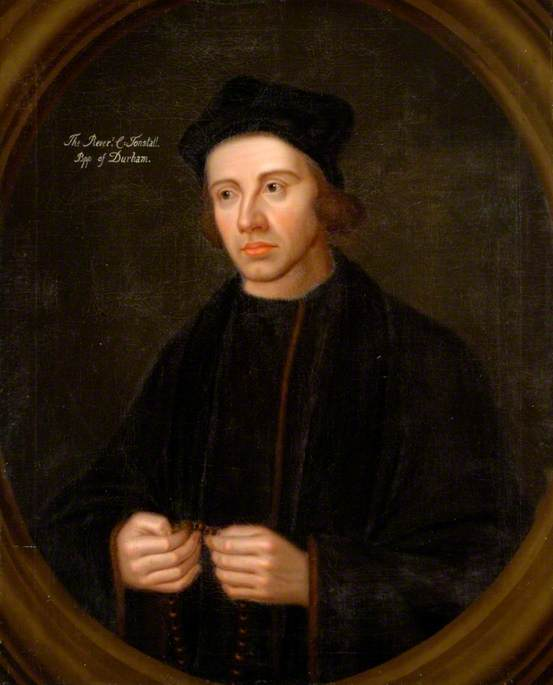
Cuthbert Tunstall, Bishop of Durham

In the 1530s, life became more dangerous for Spanish Erasmians when Erasmus's protector, the Inquisitor General Alonso Manrique de Lara fell out of favour with the royal court and lost power within his own organisation to friar-theologians. In 1532 Erasmus's friend, converso Juan de Vergara (Cisneros' Latin secretary who had worked on the Complutensian Polyglot and published Stunica's criticism of Erasmus) was arrested by the Spanish Inquisition and had to be ransomed from them by the humanist Archbishop of Toledo Alonso III Fonseca, also a correspondent of Erasmus', who had previously rescued Ignatius of Loyola from them.

There was a generational change in the Catholic hierarchy. In 1530, the reforming French bishop Guillaume Briçonnet died. In 1532 his beloved long-time mentor English Primate Warham died of old age, (Note: Erasmus writing a moving letter to William Blount's teenaged son Charles about Warham: "I wrote this in sorrow and grief, my mind totally devastated… We had made a vow to die together; he had promised a common grave…I am held back here half-alive, still owing the debt from the vow I had made, which …I will soon pay. …Instead, even time, which is supposed to cure even the most grievous sorrows, merely makes this wound more and more painful. What more can I say? I feel that I am being called. I will be glad to die here together with that incomparable and irrevocable patron of mine, provided I am allowed, by the mercy of Christ, to live there together with him.") as did reforming cardinal Giles of Viterbo and Swiss bishop Hugo von Hohenlandenberg. In 1534 his distrusted protector Clement VII (the "inclement Clement") died, his recent Italian ally Cardinal Cajetan (widely tipped as the next pope) died, and his old ally Cardinal Campeggio retired.

As more friends died (in 1533, his friend Pieter Gillis; in 1534, William Blount; in early 1536, Catherine of Aragon and Richard Pace;) and as Luther and some Lutherans and some powerful Catholic theologians renewed their personal attacks on Erasmus, his letters are increasingly focused on concerns on the status of friendships and safety as he considered moving from bland Freiburg despite his health. (Note: "I am so weary of this region[...]I feel that there is a conspiracy to kill me[...]Many hope for war." Letter to Erasmus Schets (1534))

In 1535, Erasmus's friends Thomas More, Bishop John Fisher and the Brigittine monk Richard Reynolds (Note: In the Expositio Fidelis, Erasmus recounts "Included with the Carthusians was the Brigittine monk Reynolds, a man of angelic features and angelic character and possessed of sound judgment, as I discovered through the conversations I had with him when I was in England in the company of Cardinal Campeggi.") were executed as pro-Rome traitors by Henry VIII, who Erasmus (with More) had first met as a boy and had corresponded with each other numerous times over the years. Despite illness Erasmus wrote the first biography of More (and Fisher), the short, anonymous Expositio Fidelis, which Froben published, at the instigation of de Góis. He called them the 'new martyrs' of Christendom slain by 'another Herod.'

After Erasmus's time, numerous of Erasmus's translators later met similar fates at the hands of Anglican, Catholic and Reformed sectarians and autocrats: including Margaret Pole, William Tyndale, Michael Servetus. Others, such as Charles V's Latin secretary Juan de Valdés, fled to neutral grounds.

Erasmus's friend and collaborator Bishop Cuthbert Tunstall eventually died in prison under Elizabeth I for finally refusing the Oath of Supremacy. Erasmus's correspondent Bishop Stephen Gardiner, who he had known as a teenaged student in Paris and Cambridge, was later imprisoned in the Tower of London for five years under Edward VI for impeding Protestantism. (Note: During which he occupied himself copying out quotations from Erasmus's Adages etc and formally complaining about the protestantised English translation of Erasmus's Paraphrases of the New Testament.) Damião de Góis was tried before the Portuguese Inquisition at age 72, detained almost incommunicado, finally exiled to a monastery, and on release perhaps murdered. His amanuensis Gilbert Cousin died in prison at age 66, shortly after being arrested on the personal order of Pope Pius V.

=== Death in Basel ===
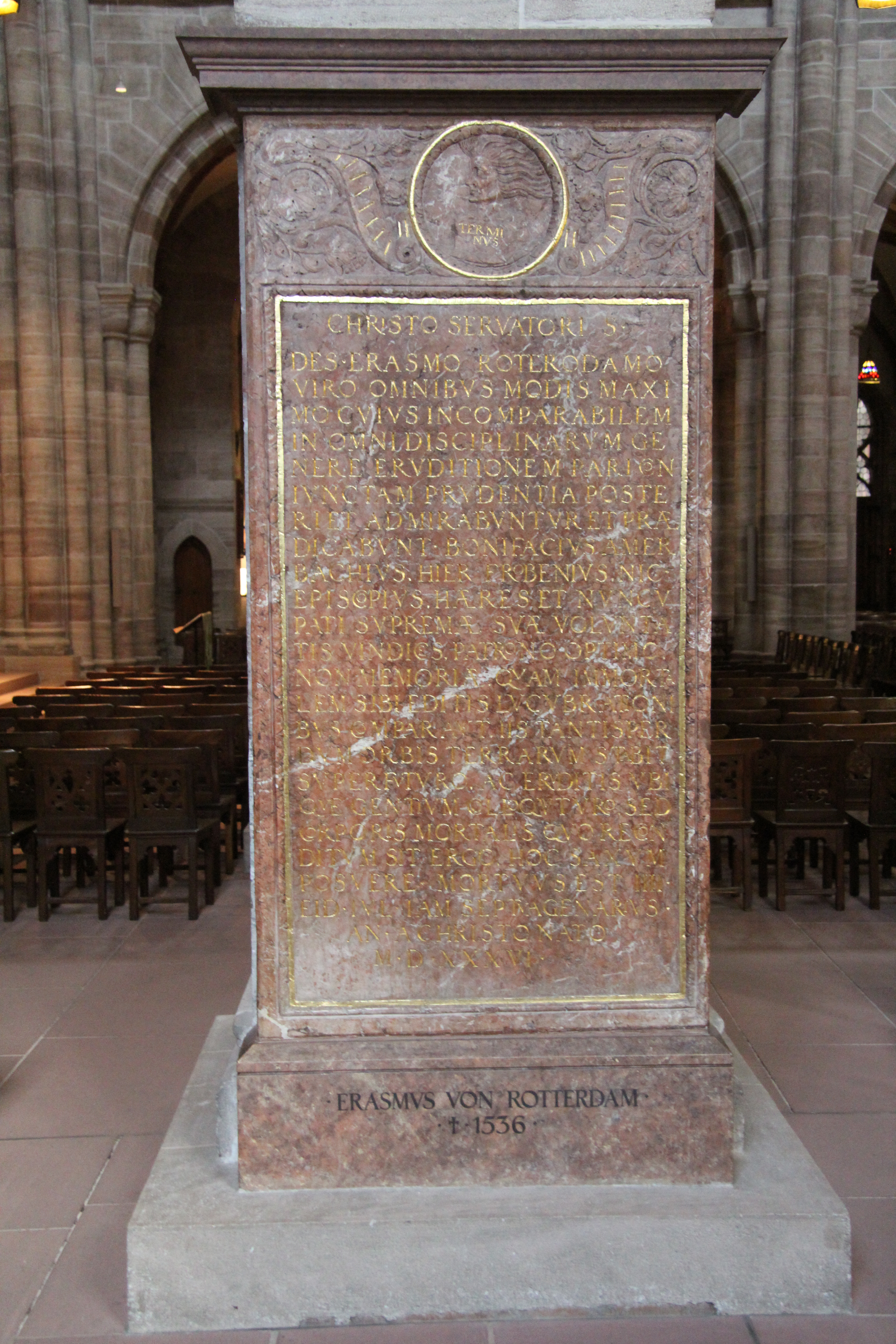
Epitaph for Erasmus in the Basel Minster. The stone is marked with historical graffiti, including that of Johannes Crucius.

When his strength began to fail, he finally decided to accept an invitation by Queen Mary of Hungary, Regent of the Netherlands (sister of his former student Archduke Ferdinand I and Emperor Charles V), to move from Freiburg to Catholic Brabant. In 1535, he moved back to the Froben compound in Protestant Basel in preparation (Œcolampadius having died, and private practice of Catholic religion now possible.) He saw his last major works, notably Ecclesiastes, through publication, though he grew more frail.

On 12 July 1536, he died from an attack of dysentery. "The most famous scholar of his day died in peaceful prosperity and in the company of celebrated and responsible friends" (including Bonifacius Amerbach, Hieronymus Froben, and Nicolaus Episcopius.) His last words, as recorded by his friend and biographer Beatus Rhenanus, were apparently "Lord, put an end to it" (Latin: domine fac finem, the same last words as Melanchthon) then "Dear God" (Dutch: Lieve God).

He had remained loyal to Roman Catholicism, but biographers have disagreed whether to treat him as an insider or an outsider. (Note: Contrast the "outsider" interpretation of Huizinga "He tried to remain in the fold of the old [Roman] Church, after having damaged it seriously, and renounced the [Protestant] Reformation, and to a certain extent even Humanism, after having furthered both with all his strength." with the "insider" interpretation of Francis Aidan Gasquet "He was a reformer in the best sense, as so many far-seeing and spiritual-minded churchmen of those days were. He desired to better and beautify and perfect the system he found in vogue, and he had the courage of his convictions to point out what he thought stood in need of change and improvement, but he was no iconoclast; he had no desire to pull down or root up or destroy under the plea of improvement. That he remained to the last the friend of Popes and bishops and other orthodox churchmen, is the best evidence, over and above his own words, that his real sentiments were not misunderstood by men who had the interests of the Church at heart, and who looked upon him as true and loyal, if perhaps a somewhat eccentric and caustic son of Holy Church. Even in his last sickness he received from the Pope proof of his esteem, for he was given a benefice of considerable value.") He may not have received or had the opportunity to receive the last rites of the Catholic Church; (Note: This assertion is contradicted by Gonzalo Ponce de Leon speaking in 1595 at the Roman Congregation of the Index on the (mostly successful) de-prohibition of Erasmus's works said that he died "as a Catholic having received the sacraments.") the contemporary reports of his death do not mention whether he asked for a Catholic priest or not, (Note: According to historian Jan van Herwaarden, it is consistent with Erasmus's view that outward signs were not important; what mattered is the believer's direct relationship with God. However, van Herwaarden states that "he did not dismiss the rites and sacraments out of hand but asserted a dying person could achieve a state of salvation without the priestly rites, provided their faith and spirit were attuned to God" (i.e., maintaining being in a State of Grace) noting Erasmus's stipulation that this was "as the (Catholic) Church believes.") if any were secretly or privately in Basel.

He was buried with great ceremony in the Basel Minster (the former cathedral). The Protestant city authorities remarkably allowed his funeral to be an ecumenical Catholic requiem Mass.

Erasmus had received dispensations (from Ferdinand Archduke of Austria, and from Emperor Charles V in 1530) to make a will rather than have his wealth revert to his order (the Chapter of Sion), or to the state, and had long pre-sold most of his personal library of almost 500 books to Polish humanist Jan Łaski. As his heir or executor he instated Bonifacius Amerbach to give scholarships to local students and the needy. One of the eventual recipients was the impoverished Protestant humanist Sebastian Castellio, who had fled from Geneva to Basel, who subsequently translated the Bible into Latin and French, and who worked for the repair of the breach and divide of Western Christianity in its Catholic, Anabaptist, and Protestant branches. As well as those 5,000 florins, (Note: 'After the payment of all outstanding claims, the sum in the hands of Bonifacius and the two Basel executors amounted to 5,000 florins. This sum was invested in a loan to the duchy of Württemberg that yielded an annual income of 250 florins. The greater part of this sum became a fund to provide scholarships for students at the University of Basel (in theology, law, and medicine); the rest went into a fund devoted to the assistance of the poor." In modern terms, 5000 florins could be between US$500,000 and US$5,000,000; 250 florins could be between $25,000 and $250,000) up to 2,000 florins had long been held in Brabant by friends, and Goclenius was appointed to administer that charity. (Note: With the unusual condition that no funds be given to residents of Germany.)

== Theology ==
Three key distinctive features of the spirituality Erasmus proposed are accommodation, inverbation, and scopus christi. (Note: Accommodation and scopus christi were ideas significant later, in Calvin's theology.)

In the view of literary historian Chester Chapin, Erasmus's tendency of thought was "towards cautious dulcification of the traditional [Catholic] view". (Note: For example, "It is likely that Erasmus rejected the traditional view of Hell as a place of real, material fire. But although he probably conceived of it as a place of mental rather than physical torment, ... Erasmus does not appear to reject the eternality of Hell.")

=== Accommodation ===
Historian Manfred Hoffmann has described accommodation as "the single most important concept in Erasmus's hermeneutic". (Note: Furthermore, "the role allegory plays in Erasmus' exegesis is analogous to the crucial place accommodation obtains in his theology".))

For Erasmus, accommodation is a universal concept: (Note: "This sense of our restricted capacity to handle truth is a basic corollary of his humanism and it provides the grounds for his appeal for toleration. ... Erasmus is less concerned about errors in doctrine than about the mental intransigence with which they may be upheld or opposed. This is not to say that he is indifferent to error, but priority goes to the preservation of a community, the body of Christ".) humans must accommodate each other, must accommodate the church and vice versa, and must take as their model how Christ accommodated the disciples in his interactions with them, and accommodated humans in his incarnation; which in turn merely reflects the eternal mutual accommodation within the Trinity. And the primary mechanism of accommodation is language, which mediates between reality and abstraction, which allows disputes of all kinds to be resolved and the gospel to be transmitted: in his New Testament, Erasmus notably translated the Greek logos in John 1:1 "In the beginning was the Word" more like "In the beginning was Speech: using Latin sermo (discourse, conversation, language) not verbum (word) emphasizing the dynamic and interpersonal communication rather than static principle: (Note: "Just as the Word of God is the image of the Father, so too, human speech is a certain image of the human mind, which is the most wondrous and powerful thing man has.") "Christ incarnate as the eloquent oration of God": "He is called Speech [sermo], because through him God, who in his own nature cannot be comprehended by any reasoning, wished to become known to us."

The role models of accommodation (Note: "The saintly versatility with which Christ and Paul accommodate their message to their imperfect hearers is one of the highest expressions of their charity, which desires the salvation of all men.") were Paul, (Note: Erasmus quoted "I have become all things to all men, that I might by all means save some." (Cor. 9:22, RSV).) that "chameleon" (or "slippery squid") and Christ, who was "more mutable than Proteus himself".

Following Paul, Quintillian (apte diecere) and Gregory the Great's Pastoral Care, Erasmus wrote that the orator, preacher or teacher must "adapt their discourse to the characteristics of their audience"; this made pastoral care the "art of arts". Erasmus wrote that most of his original works, from satires to paraphrases, were essentially the same themes packaged for different audiences.

In this light, Erasmus's ability to have friendly correspondence with both Thomas More and Thomas Bolyn, and with both Philip Melanchthon and Pope Adrian VI, can be seen as outworkings of his theology, rather than slippery insincerity (Note: His mode of expression made him "slippery like a snake", according to Luther.) or flattery of potential patrons. Similarly, it shows the theological basis of his pacificism, and his view of ecclesiastical authorities—from priests like himself to Church Councils—as necessary mediating peace-brokers.

=== Inverbation ===
For Erasmus, further to accommodating humans in his Incarnation, Christ accommodated humans by a kind of inverbation through text: we now knowing the resurrection, Christ is revealed by the Gospels in a way that we can know him better by reading him (Note: Not a novel idea: see Duns Scotus' "For as there is no place in which it is more proper to seek Thee than in Thy words, so is there no place where Thou art more clearly discovered than in Thy words. For therein Thou abidest, and thither Thou leadest all who seek and love Thee.") than those who actually heard him speak; (Note: Mansfield summarises Robert Kleinhan that "In contrast to contemporary theologies which centred on grace (Luther) or church and sacraments (the Council of Trent), Erasmus' theology 'stressed the acquisition of peace through the virtue obtainable by union with Christ through meditation upon the documents of the early church's witness to him.'") this will or may transform us. (Note: For Erica Rummel "In content, Erasmian theology is characterized by a twin emphasis on inner piety and on the word as mediator between God and the believer.")

Since the Gospels become in effect like sacraments, (Note: Margaret O'Rourke Boyle sees it as "The text was real presence." However, this may go too far: "The Christian Faith does not recognize either inlibration or inverbation".) for Erasmus reading them becomes a form of prayer (Note: "It is because Christ is in the pages of the bible that we meet him as a living person. As we read these pages we absorb his presence, we become one with him." Robert Sider.) which is spoiled by taking single sentences in isolation and using them as syllogisms. (Note: "Erasmus insists in the Ratio that in the process of interpreting a passage from Scripture it is essential to consider not only what was said but also by whom and to whom it was said, with which words, at what time, on what occasion, and what preceded and followed it." In this regard, monk Thomas Merton commented that Erasmus saw the scriptures as books of prophecy not philosophy. Nevertheless, for preaching and exegesis "‘Reasoning [from syllogisms] clearly comes into play when there is no Scripture that clearly defines the matter in question, and the divine will is inferred instead by reasoning from the comparison of several scriptural passages.") Instead, learning to understand the context, genres and literary expression in the New Testament becomes a spiritual more than academic exercise. Erasmus's has been called rhetorical theology (theologia rhetorica). (Note: This was a fine-grained extension of the medieval theory of modus procedendi, associated with Alexander of Hales and Bonaventure, that each biblical book requires a different mode of proceeding as history, law, lyric, etc.)

=== Scopus christi ===
Scopus is the unifying reference point, the navigation goal, or the organising principle of topics. (Note: Scopus comes from Origen and was also picked up by Melanchthon.) According to his assistant-turned-foe, Œcolampadius, Erasmus's rule was "nihil in sacris literis praeter Christum quaerendum" ("nothing is to be sought in the sacred letters but Christ").

What Erasmus contributes [...] is a counsel of restraint in metaphysical speculation, an accent on the revelatory breadth of the eternal Word of God, and an invitation to think of Christ incarnate as the eloquent oration of God. But the central impulse [...] is the affirmation of the full incarnation of Christ in human existence [...] for the transformation of human life. With that, the ethical capstone of Erasmus' reflections on Christ centers on the responsibility to imitate Christ's love for others, and thus for advancing the cause of peace in personal and social life.

— Terrence J. Martin, The Christology of Erasmus

In Hoffmann's words, for Erasmus "Christ is the scopus of everything": "the focus in which both dimensions of reality, the human and the divine, intersect" and so He himself is the hermeneutical principle of scripture": "the middle is the medium, the medium is the mediator, the mediator is the reconciler". In Erasmus's early Enchiridion (Note: "Erasmus is so thoroughly, radically Christ-centered in his understanding of both Christian faith and practice that if we overlook or downplay this key aspect of his character and vision, we not only do him a grave disservice but we almost completely misunderstand him.") he had given this scopus in typical medieval terms of an ascent of being to God (vertical), but from the mid-1510s life he moved to an analogy of Copernican planetary circling around Christ the centre (horizontal) or Columbian navigation towards a destination.

One effect is that scriptural interpretation must be done starting with the teachings and interactions of Jesus in the Gospels, with the Sermon on the Mount serving as the starting point, (Note: According to philosopher John Smith "The core of his theological thought he traced back to Christ's Sermon on the Mount, rather than Paul.") and arguably with the Beatitudes and the Lord's Prayer at the head of the queue. This privileges peacemaking, mercy, meekness, (Note: Historical theologian Carl Meyer writes "Because the Scriptures are the genuine oracles of God, welling forth from the deepest recesses of the divine mind, Erasmus said they should be approached with reverence. Humility and veneration are needed to find the secret chambers of eternal wisdom. 'Stoop to enter', Erasmus warned, 'else you might bump your head and bounce back!'") purity of heart, hungering after righteousness, poverty of spirit, etc. as the unassailable core of Christianity and piety and true theology. (Note: According to historian Emily Alianello, "Throughout Ecclesiastes, Erasmus seeks to orient his theories of preaching around 'the simplicity of Christ's teaching and example'. Consequently, preaching is not for engaging in controversy, but for bringing salvation, moving the congregation to a moral life and building community through concord.")

The Sermon on the Mount provides the axioms on which every legitimate theology must be built, as well as the ethics governing theological discourse, and the rules for validating theological products; Erasmus's philosophia christi treats the primary and initial teaching of Jesus in the first Gospel as a theological methodology. (Note: I.e., Erasmus's method is that Jesus' primary teachings are not things you (whether lay person or theologian) interpret in the light of everything else (particularly some novel, post-patristic theological schema, even if ostensibly biblically coherent), but what you base your interpretation of everything else on.)

For example, "peacemaking" is a possible topic in any Christian theology; but for Erasmus, from the Beatitude, it must be a starting, reference and ending point when discussing all other theological notions, such as church authority, the Trinity, etc. Moreover, Christian theology must only be done in a peacemaking fashion for peacemaking purposes; and any theology that promotes division and warmongering is thereby anti-Christian. (Note: This is quite contrary to Luther's privileging of his scheme of justification, its associated verses of Romans and Galatians, and his prizing of vehement assertions and insults. Erica Rummel notes "The similarities between his and Luther's thought were of course superficial.")

=== Mystical theology ===
Another important concept to Erasmus was "the Folly of the Cross" (which The Praise of Folly explored): (Note: As with many of his individual works, reading The Praise of Folly in isolation from his other works may give an idea of Erasmus's priorities different to that given by broader reading, even though he sometimes claimed to be re-presenting essentially the same thoughts in different genres.) the view that Truth belongs to the exuberant, perhaps ecstatic, world of what is foolish, strange, unexpected and even superficially repellent to us, rather than to the frigid worlds which intricate scholastic dialectical and syllogistic philosophical argument all too often generated; (Note: This was a long-recognized tendency: indeed Aquinas wrote in the Preface to his Summa Theologiae that "students in this science have not seldom been hampered by what they have found written by other authors, partly on account of the multiplication of useless questions, articles, and arguments") this produced in Erasmus a profound disinterest in hyper-rationality, (Note: "Erasmus saw the scholastic exercise, in its high intellectualism, as fundamentally wrong-headed.") and an emphasis on verbal, rhetorical, mystical, pastoral and personal/political moral concerns instead.

=== Theological writings ===
Several scholars have suggested Erasmus wrote as an evangelist not an academic theologian. (Note: Historian William McCuaig wrote "I will however defend the view that for the historian evangelism is the category to which Erasmus should rightly be assigned." Historian Hilmar Pabel wrote "an essential aspect of Erasmus' life's work [was] ... his participation in the responsibility of the bishops and all pastors to win souls for Christ.") Even "theology was to be metamorphic speech, converting persons to Christ". Erasmus did not conceive of Christianity as fundamentally an intellectual system:

Yet these ancient fathers were they who confuted both the Jews and Heathens [...]; they confuted them (I say), yet by their lives and miracles, rather than by words and syllogisms; and the persons they thus proselyted were downright honest, well meaning people, such as understood plain sense better than any artificial pomp of reasoning [...]

— Erasmus, The Praise of Folly

Historian William McCuaig commented "I have never read a work by him on any subject that was not at bottom a piece of evangelical literature."

We may distinguish four different lines of work, parallel with each other, and complementary. First, the establishing and critical elucidation of the biblical texts; alongside it, the editions of the great patristic commentators; then, the exegetical works properly so called, in which these two fundamental researches yield their fruit; and finally, the methodological works, which in their first state constitute a sort of preface to the various other studies, but which—in return—were nourished and enlarged by them as they went along.

— Louis Bouyer

Apart from these programmatic works, Erasmus also produce a number of prayers, sermons, essays, masses and poems for specific benefactors and occasions, often on topics where Erasmus and his benefactor agreed. His thought was particularly influenced by Origen. (Note: "Without denying the presence of theological mistakes in Origen's corpus, Erasmus felt that an irenic attitude toward Origen was more helpful to the Church than one of censorious criticism. Erasmus believed that Origen had seen further into the mind of St Paul than Augustine had done.")

He often set himself the challenge of formulating positive, moderate, non-superstitious versions of contemporary Catholic practices that might be more acceptable both to scandalised Catholics and Protestants of good will: the better attitudes to the sacraments, saints, Mary, indulgences, statues, scriptural ignorance and fanciful Biblical interpretation, prayer, dietary fasts, external ceremonialism, authority, vows, docility, submission to Rome, etc. For example, in his Paean in Honour of the Virgin Mary (1503) Erasmus elaborated his theme that the Incarnation had been hinted far and wide, which could impact the theology of the fate of the remote unbaptised and grace, and the place of classical philosophy:

You are assuredly the Woman of renown: both heaven and earth and the succession of all the ages uniquely join to celebrate your praise in a musical concord. [...]

During the centuries of the previous age the oracles of the gentiles spoke of you in obscure riddles. Egyptian prophecies, Apollo's tripod, the Sibylline books, gave hints of you. The mouths of learned poets predicted your coming in oracles they did not understand. [...]

Both the Old and the New Testament, like two cherubim with wings joined and unanimous voices, repeatedly sing your praise. [...]

Thus indeed have writers religiously vied to proclaim you, on the one hand inspired prophets, on the other eloquent Doctors of the church, both filled with the same spirit, as the former foretold your coming in joyful oracles before your birth and the latter heaped prayerful praise on you when you appeared.

— Erasmus, Paean in Honour of the Virgin Mary (1503)

=== Religious reform ===
==== Personal Reform ====
===== Proper attitude to sacraments =====
Erasmus expressed much of his reform program in terms of the proper attitude towards the sacraments and their ramifications: notably for the underappreciated sacraments of Baptism and Marriage (see On the Institution of Christian Marriage) considered as vocations more than events; (Note: In marriage, Erasmus's two significant innovations, according to historian Nathan Ron, were that "matrimony can and should be a joyous bond, and that this goal can be achieved by a relationship between spouses based on mutuality, conversation, and persuasion.") and for the mysterious Eucharist, pragmatic Confession, the dangerous Last Rites (writing On the Preparation for Death), (Note: According to historian Thomas Tentler, few Christians from his century gave as much emphasis as Erasmus to a pious attitude to death: the terrors of death are "closely connected to guilt from sin and fear of punishment" the antidote to which is first "trust in Christ and His ability to forgive sins", avoiding (Lutheran) boastful pride, then a loving, undespairing life lived with appropriate penitence. The priests' focus in the Last Rites should be comfort and hope.) and the pastoral Holy Orders (see Ecclesiastes). Historians have noted that Erasmus's commendation of the benefits of immersive, docile scripture-reading is put in sacramental terms.

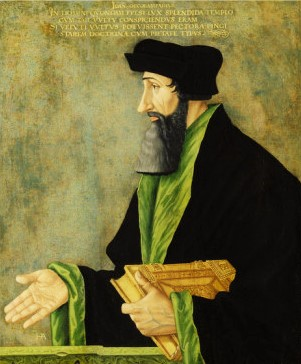
Johannes Œcolampadius by Asper (1550)

A test of the Reformation was the doctrine of the sacraments, and the crux of this question was the observance of the Eucharist. Erasmus was concerned that the sacramentarians, headed by Œcolampadius of Basel, were claiming Erasmus held views similar to their own to try to claim him for their schismatic and "erroneous" movement. When the Mass was finally banned in Basel in 1529, Erasmus immediately abandoned the city, as did the other expelled Catholic clergy.

In 1530, Erasmus published a new edition of the orthodox treatise of Algerus against the heretic Berengar of Tours in the eleventh century. He added a dedication, affirming his belief in the reality of the Body of Christ after consecration in the Eucharist, commonly referred to as transubstantiation. Erasmus seems to have suspected that the scholastic formulation of transubstantiation stretched language past its breaking point, however he noted that even if transubstantiation were not true, as some Protestants had started to claim, it should not be a cause of preventing people with traditional views from worshiping (latria) God in the Host, as the divinity of God is everywhere present.

By and large, the miraculous real change that interested Erasmus, the author, more than that of the bread is the transformation in the humble partaker. Erasmus wrote several notable pastoral books and pamphlets on sacraments, always looking through rather than at the rituals or forms: (Note: On confession "he differed from Luther and Wycliffe as much as he differed from mainstream conservative theology in deferring any question of how the sacrament worked in favour of its creating a moral development in the penitent.")

- on marriage and wise matches,
- preparation for confession and the need for pastoral encouragement by priests (whose primary duty was to shepherd, not just to consecrate/absolve),
- preparation for death and the need to assuage fear,
- training and helping the preaching duties of priests under bishops,
- baptism and the need for that faithful to own the baptismal vows made for them.

==== Catholic reform ====
===== Institutional reforms =====
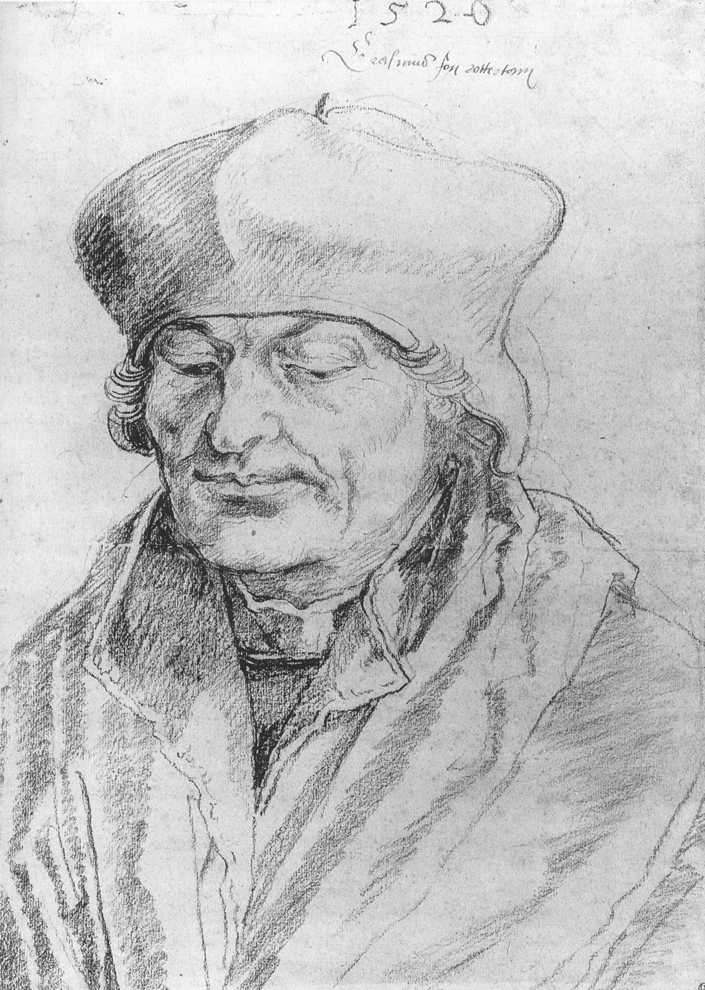
Albrecht Dürer, Portrait of Erasmus, sketch: black chalk on paper, 1520

The Protestant Reformation began in the year following the publication of his pathbreaking edition of the New Testament in Latin and Greek (1516). The issues between the reforming and reactionary tendencies of the church, from which Protestantism later emerged, had become so clear that many intellectuals and churchmen could not escape the summons to join the debate.

Historians have characterized the extent of Erasmus' criticisms differently. According to historian C. Scott Dixon, Erasmus not only criticized church failings but questioned many of his Church's basic teachings. (Note: Erasmus had been criticizing the Catholic church for years before the reformers emerged, and not just pointing up its failings but questioning many of its basic teachings. He was the author of a series of publications, including a Greek edition of the New Testament (1516), which laid the foundations for a model of Christianity that called for a pared-down, internalized style of religiosity focused on Scripture rather than the elaborate, and incessant, outward rituals of the medieval church. Erasmus was not a forerunner in the sense that he conceived or defended ideas that later made up the substance of the Reformation thought. [...] It is enough that some of his ideas merged with the later Reformation message.) However, according to biographer Erika Rummel, "Erasmus was aiming at the correction of abuses rather than at doctrinal innovation or institutional change. Unlike Luther, he accepted papal primacy and the teaching authority of the church and did not discount human tradition. " (Note: "The reforms proposed by Erasmus were in the social rather than the doctrinal realm. His principal aim was to foster piety and to deepen spirituality.") Historian Peter Kaufman is even milder: "Erasmus implied that some release from ecclesiastical regimentation was perfectly appropriate for some mature Christians (and that some forms of regimentation were inappropriate for all Christians), but neither Erasmus nor his humanist friends suggested that Christians were (or should be) ultimately independent."

In theologian Louis Bouyer's interpretation, Erasmus's agenda was "to reform the Church from within by a renewal of biblical theology, based on philological study of the New Testament text, and supported by a knowledge of patristics, itself renewed by the same methods. The final object of it all was to nourish [...] chiefly moral and spiritual reform". (Note: "Rigorously scientific biblical study must sustain an effort to renew the interior life, and the interior life must itself be at once the agent and the beneficiary of a renewal of the whole of Christian society." This went beyond the devotio moderna, which "was a spirituality of teachers"m)

At the height of his literary fame, Erasmus was called upon to take one side, but public partisanship was foreign to his beliefs, nature, and habits. Despite all his criticism of clerical corruption and abuses within the Western Church, (Note: Writer Gregory Wolfe notes however "For Erasmus, the narrative of decline is a form of despair, a failure to believe that the tradition can and will generate new life.") especially at first he sided unambiguously with neither Luther nor the anti-Lutherans publicly (though in private he lobbied assiduously against extremism from both parties), but eventually shunned the breakaway Protestant Reformation movements along with their most radical offshoots.

I have constantly declared, in countless letters, booklets, and personal statements, that I do not want to be involved with either party.

— Erasmus, Spongia (1523)

The world had laughed at his satire, The Praise of Folly, but few had interfered with his activities. He believed that his work had commended itself to the religious world's best minds and dominant powers. Erasmus chose to write in Latin (and Greek), the languages of scholars. He did not build a large body of supporters among the unlettered; his critiques reached only a small, elite audience.

Erasmus was also notable for exposing several important historical documents of theological and political importance as forgeries or misattributions: including pseudo-Dionysius the Areopagite, the Gravi de pugna attributed to St Augustine, the Ad Herennium attributed to Cicero, and (by reprinting Lorenzo Valla's work) the Donation of Constantine.

===== Anti-fraternalism =====
Reacting from his own experiences, Erasmus came to believe that monastic life and institutions no longer served the positive spiritual or social purpose they once may have: in the Enchiridion he controversially put it "Monkishness is not piety." (Note: monachatus non-est pietas, "Being a monk is not piety", but he adds "but a way of life that may be useful or not useful according to each man's physical make-up and disposition".) At this time, it was better to live as "a monk in the world" than in the monastery. (Note: DeMolen claims: "It is important to recall that Erasmus remained a member of the Austin Canons all his life. His lifestyle harmonized with the spirit of the Austin Canons even though he lived outside their monastic walls." Erasmus represents the anti-Observantist wing of the canons regular who believed that the charism of their orders required them to be more externally focussed (on pastoral, missionary, scholarly, charitable and sacramental works) and correspondingly de-focussed on monastic severity and ceremonialism.)

Many of his works contain diatribes against supposed monastic corruption and careerism, particularly against the mendicant friars (Franciscans and Dominicans). These orders also typically ran the university's Scholastic theology programs, from whose ranks came his most dangerous enemies. The more some attacked him, the more offensive he became about what he saw as their political influence and materialistic opportunism.

Alastor, an evil spirit: "They are a certain Sort of Animals in black and white Vestments, Ash-colour'd Coats, and various other Dresses, that are always hovering about the Courts of Princes, and [to each side] are continually instilling into their Ears the Love of War, and exhorting the Nobility and common People to it, haranguing them in their Sermons, that it is a just, holy and religious War. [...]"

Charon: "[...] What do they get out of it?"

Alastor: "Because they get more by those that die, than those that live. There are last Wills and Testaments, Funeral Obsequies, Bulls, and a great many other Articles of no despicable Profit. And in the last Place, they had rather live in a Camp, than in their Cells. War breeds a great many Bishops, who were not thought good for any Thing in a Time of Peace."

— Erasmus, "Charon", Colloquies

He was scandalised by superstitions (such as that if a person were buried in a Franciscan habit, they would go directly to heaven), (Note: See the colloquy Exequiae Seriphicae) crime, and child novices. He advocated various reforms, including a ban on taking orders until the 30th year; the closure of corrupt and smaller monasteries; respect for bishops; requiring work, not begging (reflecting the practice of his own order of Augustinian Canons); the downplaying of monastic hours, fasts and ceremonies; and a less mendacious approach to gullible pilgrims and tenants.

However, he was not in favour of speedy closures of monasteries, nor of closing larger reformed monasteries with important libraries: in his account of his pilgrimage to Walsingham, he noted that the funds extracted from pilgrims typically supported houses for the poor and elderly.

These ideas widely influenced his generation of humanists, both Catholic and Protestant, and the lurid hyperbolic attacks in his half-satire The Praise of Folly were later treated by Protestants as objective reports of near-universal corruption. Furthermore, "what is said over a glass of wine, ought not to be remembered and written down as a serious statement of belief", such as his proposal to marry all monks to all nuns or to send them all away to fight the Turks and colonise new islands.

He believed the only vow necessary for Christians should be the vow of baptism, and others such as the vows of the evangelical counsels, while admirable in intent and content, were now mainly counter-productive.

However, Erasmus frequently commended the evangelical counsels for all believers, and with more than lip service: for example, the first adage of his reputation-establishing Adagia was "Between friends all is common", where he tied common ownership (such as practised by his order's style of poverty) with the teachings of classical philosophers and Christ.

His main Catholic opposition was from scholars in the mendicant orders. He purported that "Saint Francis came lately to me in a dream and thanked me for chastising them." After his lifetime, scholars of mendicant orders have sometimes disputed Erasmus as hyperbolic and ill-informed. A 20th-century Benedictine scholar wrote of him as "all sail and no rudder".

Erasmus did also have significant support and contact with reform-minded friars, including Franciscans such as Jean Vitrier and Cardinal Cisneros, and Dominicans such as Cardinal Cajetan, the former master of the Order of Preachers.

==== Protestant reform ====
The early reformers built their theology on Erasmus's philological analyses of specific verses in the New Testament: repentance over penance (the basis of the first thesis of the Luther's 95 Theses), justification by imputation, grace as favour or clemency, faith as hoping trust, human transformation over reformation, congregation over church, mystery over sacrament, etc. In Erasmus's view, they went too far, downplayed Sacred Tradition such as Patristic interpretations, and irresponsibly fomented bloodshed.

Erasmus was one of many scandalised by the sale of indulgences to fund Pope Leo X's projects. His view, given in a 1518 letter to John Colet, was less theological than political: "The Roman curia has abandoned any sense of shame. What could be more shameless than these constant indulgences? And now they put up war against the Turks as a pretext, when their aim really is to drive the Spaniards from Naples."

===== Increasing disagreement with Luther =====
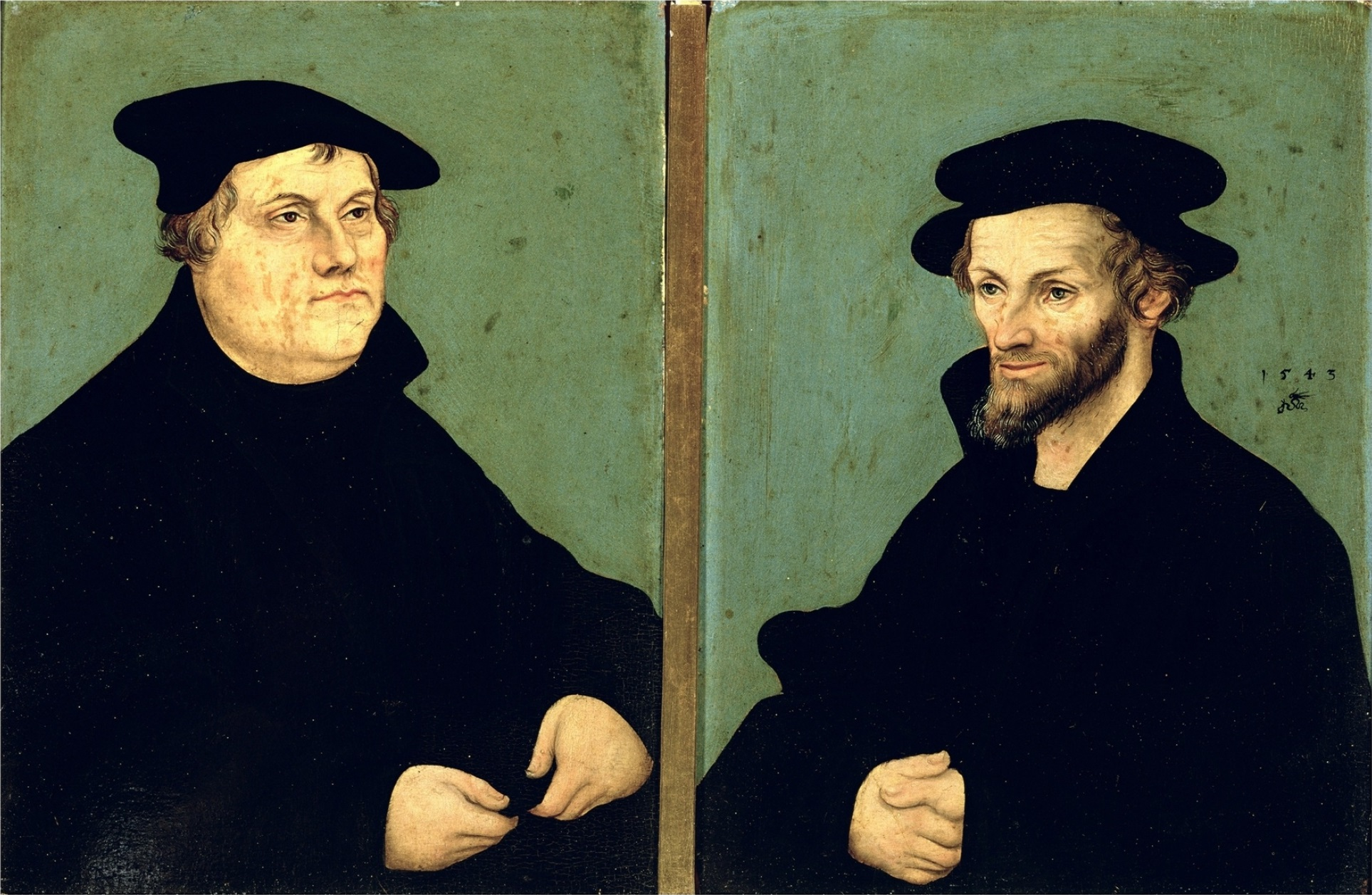
Portraits of Martin Luther (left) and Philip Melanchthon by Lucas Cranach the Elder

Erasmus and Luther impacted each other greatly. Each had misgivings about each other from the beginning (Erasmus on Luther's rash and antagonistic character, Luther on Erasmus's focus on morality rather than grace) but strategically agreed not to be negative about the other in public.

Noting Luther's criticisms of corruption in the Church, Erasmus described Luther to Pope Leo X as "a mighty trumpet of gospel truth" while agreeing, "It is clear that many of the reforms for which Luther calls" (e.g., on the sale of indulgences) "are urgently needed." However, behind the scenes Erasmus forbade his publisher Froben from handling the works of Luther and tried to keep the reform movement focused on institutional rather than theological issues, yet he also privately wrote to authorities to prevent Luther's persecution. In the words of one historian, "at this earlier period he was more concerned with the fate of Luther than his theology."

In 1520, Erasmus wrote that "Luther ought to be answered and not crushed." However, the publication of Luther's On the Babylonian Captivity of the Church (October 1520), which largely repudiated Church teaching on sacraments, and his subsequent bellicosity drained Erasmus's and many humanists' sympathy, even more as Christians became partisans and the partisans took to violence.

Luther hoped for his cooperation in a work which seemed only the natural outcome of Erasmus's own, (Note: "In the first years of the Reformation many thought that Luther was only carrying out the program of Erasmus, and this was the opinion of those strict Catholics who from the outset of the great conflict included Erasmus in their attacks on Luther." Catholic Encyclopedia) and spoke with admiration of Erasmus's superior learning. In their early correspondence, Luther expressed boundless admiration for all Erasmus had done in the cause of a sound and reasonable Christianity and urged him to join the Lutheran party. Erasmus declined to commit himself, arguing his usual "small target" excuse, that to do so would endanger the cause of bonae litterae (Note: An expression Erasmus coined. Bonae connotes more than just good, but also moral, honest and brave literature. Such sound learning encompassed both sacred literature (Latin: sacrae litterae), namely patristic writings and sacred scriptures (Latin: sacrae scripturae), and profane literature (Latin: prophanae litterae) by classical pagan authors.) which he regarded as one of his purposes in life. Only as an independent scholar could he hope to influence the reform of religion. When Erasmus declined to support him, the "straightforward" Luther became angered that Erasmus was avoiding the responsibility due either to cowardice or a lack of purpose.

However, any hesitancy on the part of Erasmus may have stemmed not from lack of courage or conviction, but rather from a concern over the mounting disorder and violence of the reform movement. To Philip Melanchthon in 1524 he wrote:

I know nothing of your church; at the very least it contains people who will, I fear, overturn the whole system and drive the princes into using force to restrain good men and bad alike. The gospel, the word of God, faith, Christ, and Holy Spirit – these words are always on their lips; look at their lives and they speak quite another language.

Erasmus attempted various distinctions to escape accusations of Lutheranism: for example for the claim that he emphasized faith to the exclusion of charity he wrote "[My paraphrases] do not offer even the tiniest support to the Lutheran heresy, since my propositions [faith alone suffices without merits] speak of those who are purified by baptism, whereas Luther speaks of the good works of adults after baptism."

Catholic theologian George Chantraine notes that, where Luther quotes Luke 11:21 "He that is not with me is against me", Erasmus takes Mark 9:40 "For he that is not against us, is on our part."

Though he sought to remain accommodative in doctrinal disputes, each side accused him of siding with the other, perhaps because of his perceived influence and what they regarded as his dissembling neutrality, (Note: Future cardinal Aleander, his former friend and roommate at the Aldine Press, wrote "The poison of Erasmus has a much more dangerous effect than that of Luther". Catholic Encyclopedia) which he regarded as peacemaking accommodation:

I detest dissension because it goes both against the teachings of Christ and against a secret inclination of nature. I doubt that either side in the dispute can be suppressed without grave loss.

— On Free Will

===== Dispute on free will =====
By 1523, and first suggested in a letter from Henry VIII, Erasmus had been convinced that Luther's ideas on necessity/free will were a subject of core disagreement deserving a public airing, and strategised with friends and correspondents on how to respond with proper moderation without making the situation worse for all, especially for the humanist reform agenda. He eventually chose a campaign that involved an irenical 'dialogue' The Inquisition of Faith, a positive, evangelical model sermon On the Measureless Mercy of God, and a gently critical 'diatribe' On Free Will.

The publication of his brief book On Free Will initiated what has been called "The greatest debate of that era", which still has ramifications today. They bypassed discussion on reforms which they both agreed on in general, and instead dealt with authority and biblical justifications of synergism versus monergism in relation to salvation.

Luther responded with On the Bondage of the Will (De servo arbitrio) (1525).

Erasmus replied to this in his lengthy two-volume Hyperaspistes and other works, which Luther ignored. Apart from the perceived moral failings among followers of the Reformers—an important sign for Erasmus—he also dreaded any change in doctrine, citing the long history of the Church as a bulwark against innovation. He put the matter bluntly to Luther:

We are dealing with this: Would a stable mind depart from the opinion handed down by so many men famous for holiness and miracles, depart from the decisions of the Church, and commit our souls to the faith of someone like you who has sprung up just now with a few followers, although the leading men of your flock do not agree either with you or among themselves – indeed though you do not even agree with yourself, since in this same Assertion you say one thing in the beginning and something else later on, recanting what you said before.

— Hyperaspistes I

Continuing his chastisement of Luther – and undoubtedly put off by the notion of there being "no pure interpretation of Scripture anywhere but in Wittenberg" – Erasmus touches upon another important point of the controversy:

You stipulate that we should not ask for or accept anything but Holy Scripture, but you do it in such a way as to require that we permit you to be its sole interpreter, renouncing all others. Thus the victory will be yours if we allow you to be not the steward but the lord of Holy Scripture.

— Hyperaspistes, Book I

===== "False evangelicals" =====
In 1529, Erasmus wrote "An epistle against those who falsely boast they are Evangelicals" to Gerardus Geldenhouwer (former Bishop of Utrecht, also schooled at Deventer).

You declaim bitterly against the luxury of priests, the ambition of bishops, the tyranny of the Roman Pontiff, and the babbling of the sophists; against our prayers, fasts, and Masses; and you are not content to retrench the abuses that may be in these things, but must needs abolish them entirely.

Here Erasmus complains of the doctrines and morals of the Reformers, applying the same critique he had made about public Scholastic disputations:

Look around on this 'Evangelical' generation, and observe whether among them less indulgence is given to luxury, lust, or avarice, than among those whom you so detest. Show me any one person who by that Gospel has been reclaimed from drunkenness to sobriety, from fury and passion to meekness, from avarice to liberality, from reviling to well-speaking, from wantonness to modesty. I will show you a great many who have become worse through following it. [...] The solemn prayers of the Church are abolished, but now there are very many who never pray at all. [...]

I have never entered their conventicles, but I have sometimes seen them returning from their sermons, the countenances of all of them displaying rage, and wonderful ferocity, as though they were animated by the evil spirit. [...]

Who ever beheld in their meetings any one of them shedding tears, smiting his breast, or grieving for his sins? [...] Confession to the priest is abolished, but very few now confess to God. [...] They have fled from Judaism that they may become Epicureans.

— Epistola contra quosdam qui se falso iactant evangelicos.

===== Other =====
According to historian Christopher Ocker, the early reformers "needed tools that let their theological distinctions pose as commonplaces in a textual theology; [...] Erasmus provided the tools", but this tendentious distinction-making, reminiscent of the recent excesses of Scholasticism to Erasmus's eyes, "was precisely what Erasmus disliked about Luther" and "Protestant polemicists".

Erasmus wrote books against aspects of the teaching, impacts or threats of several other Reformers:

- Ulrich von Hutten: Spongia adversus aspergines Hutteni (1523)
- Martin Bucer: Responsio ad fratres Inferioris Germaniae ad epistolam apologeticam incerto autoreproditam (1530)
- Heinrich Eppendorf: Admonitio adversus mendacium et obstrectationem (1530)

However, Erasmus maintained friendly relations with other Protestants, notably the irenic Melanchthon and Albrecht Dürer.

A common accusation, supposedly started by antagonistic monk-theologians, (Note: Namely Egmondanus, the Louvain Carmelite Nicolaas Baechem.) made Erasmus responsible for Martin Luther and the Reformation: "Erasmus laid the egg, and Luther hatched it." Erasmus wittily dismissed the charge, claiming that Luther had "hatched a different bird entirely". Erasmus-reader Peter Canisius commented: "Certainly there was no lack of eggs for Luther to hatch." (Note: Another commentator: "Erasmus laid the egg that Luther broke.")

== Philosophy ==
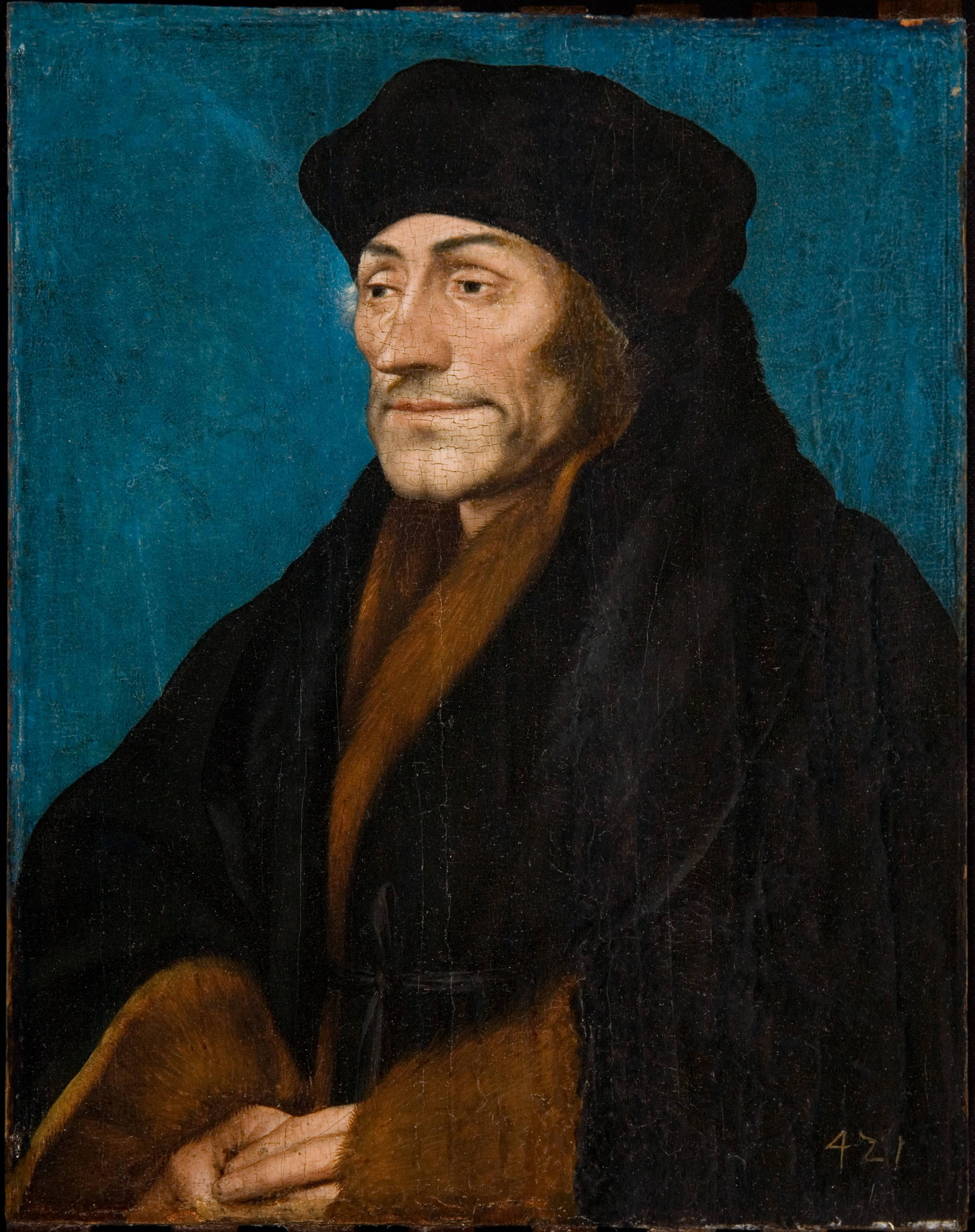
Portrait by Hans Holbein the Younger and workshop

Erasmus has a problematic standing in the history of philosophy: whether he should be called a philosopher at all, (Note: For Craig R. Thompson, Erasmus cannot be called philosopher in the technical sense, since he disdained formal logic and metaphysics and cared only for moral philosophy. Similarly, John Monfasani reminds us that Erasmus never claimed to be a philosopher, was not trained as a philosopher, and wrote no explicit works of philosophy, although he repeatedly engaged in controversies that crossed the boundary from philosophy to theology. His relation to philosophy bears further scrutiny.) (as, indeed, some question whether he should be considered a theologian either). Erasmus deemed himself to be a rhetorician (rhetoric being the art of argumentation to find what was most probably true on questions where logic could not provide certainty) or grammarian rather than a philosopher. He was particularly influenced by satirist and rhetorician Lucian. Erasmus's writings shifted "an intellectual culture from logical disputation about things to quarrels about texts, contexts, and words".

=== Classical ===
Erasmus syncretistically took phrases, ideas and motifs from many classical philosophers to furnish discussions of Christian themes: (Note: According to historian Jamie Gianoutsos, Erasmus was not cherry-picking, in the way of St Augustine's 'spoiling the Egyptians', i.e., acquiring what is valuable from the pagan heritage for the benefit of Christianity. "Erasmus, in contrast, had expressed reserve and even cautious criticism for Augustine's views while betraying great enthusiasm for St Jerome and his metaphor of the freeman who marries the captive slave to obtain her freedom. Christianity [...] had wed itself to the classical heritage to enhance and liberate it (i.e., that heritage) from its pagan ethos".) academics have identified aspects of his thought as variously Platonist (duality), Cynical (asceticism), Stoic (adiaphora), Epicurean (ataraxia, pleasure as virtue), realist/non-voluntarist, and Isocratic (rhetoric, political education, syncretism). However, his Christianized version of Epicureanism is regarded as his own.

Erasmus was sympathetic to a kind of epistemological (Ciceronian not Cartesian) Scepticism: (Note: Historian Fritz Caspari quipped that Machiavelli "appears as a sceptic whose premise is the badness of man", while Erasmus is a sceptic whose general premise is "man is or can be made good".)

A Sceptic is not someone who doesn't care to know what is true or false ... but rather someone who does not make a final decision easily or fight to the death for his own opinion, but rather accepts as probable what someone else accepts as certain ... I explicitly exclude from Scepticism whatever is set forth in Sacred Scripture or whatever has been handed down to us by the authority of the Church.

— Erasmus

Historian Kirk Essary has noted that from his earliest to last works Erasmus "regularly denounced the Stoics as specifically unchristian in their hardline position and advocacy of apatheia": warm affection and an appropriately fiery heart being inalienable parts of human sincerity; however, historian Ross Dealy sees Erasmus's decrial of other non-gentle "perverse affections" as having Stoical roots.

Following Rufinus' translation of Origen's commentary on Romans, Erasmus wrote in terms of a tri-partite nature of man, with the soul (animus) as the seat of free will: choosing the spirit (spiritus) over the warring flesh/carnality (carnis) creates right order.

The body is purely material; the spirit is purely divine; the soul ... is tossed back and forward between the two according to whether it resists or gives way to the temptations of the flesh. The spirit makes us gods; the body makes us beasts; the soul makes us men.

— Erasmus

Erasmus also put it that the mind (anima) should act a ruler over the body (corpus) and the spirit, which he used to provide political analogies: correct rule (by the prince=mind) produces peace in the body and the body politic.

According to theologian George van Kooten, Erasmus was the first modern scholar "to note the similarities between Plato's Symposium and John's Gospel", first in the Enchiridion then in the Adagia, pre-dating other scholarly interest by 400 years.

=== Anti-scholasticism ===
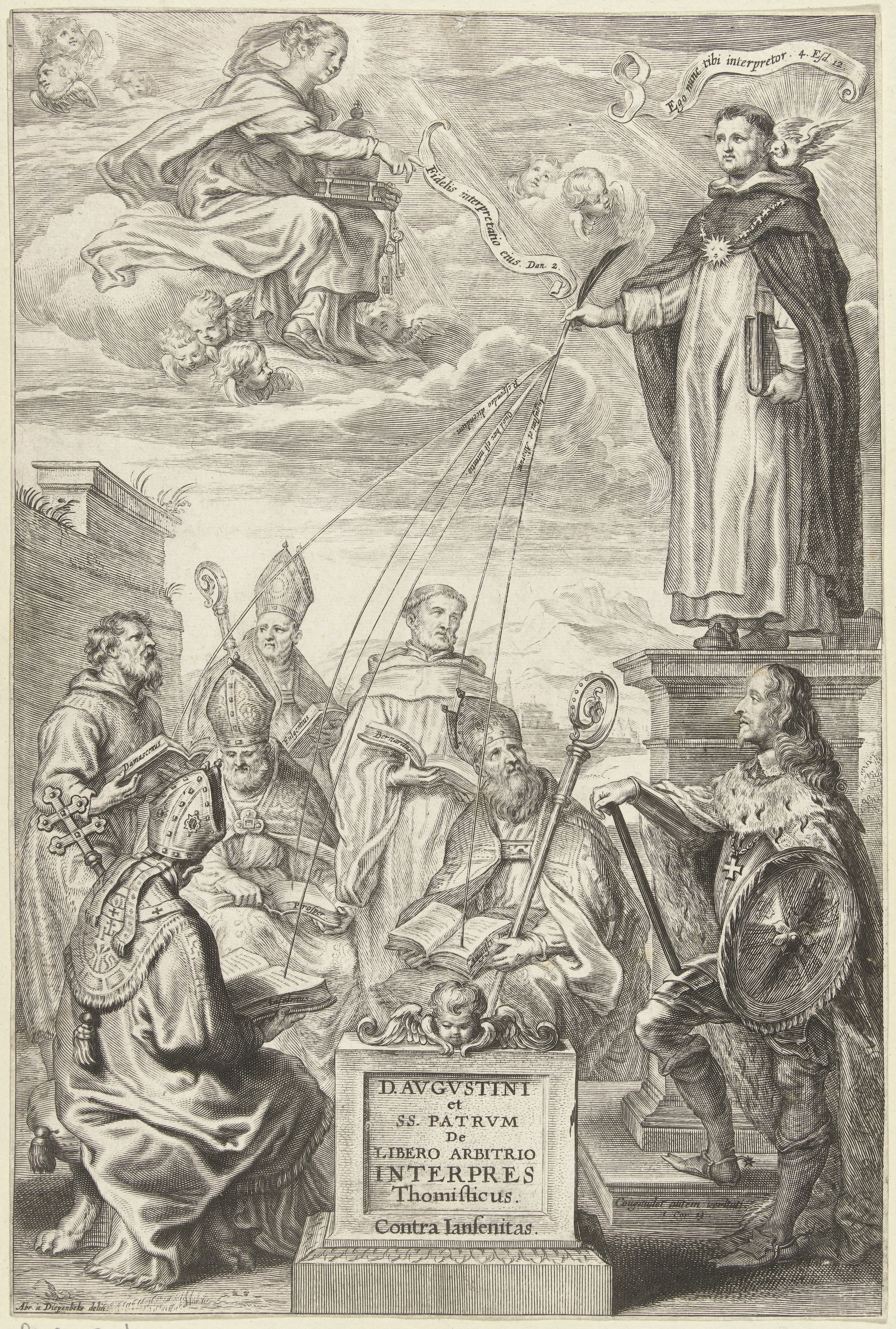
Thomas Aquinas inspiring himself on Free Will from the writings of previous theologians such as Augustine (1652)

Erasmus did not have a metaphysical bone in his frail body, and had no real feeling for the philosophical concerns of scholastic theology.

— Lewis W. Spitz

He usually eschewed metaphysical, epistemological and logical philosophy as found in Aristotle: (Note: In the Adagia, Erasmus quotes Aristotle 304 times, "making extensive use of the moral, philosophical, political, and rhetorical writings as well as those on natural philosophy, while completely shunning the logical works that formed the basis for scholastic philosophy".) in particular the curriculum and systematic methods of the post-Aquinas Schoolmen (Scholastics) (Note: "However learned the works of those men may be, however 'subtle' and, if it please them, however 'seraphic', it must still be admitted that the Gospels and Epistles are the supreme authority." Erasmus, Paraclesis, cited by Sider.) and what he regarded as their frigid, counter-productive Aristotelianism: (Note: Erasmus followed the tradition of proto-humanist Petrarch, summarised as: "Aristotle was spiritually deficient, because although he could define virtue, his words lacked the power to motivate men to lead virtuous lives. It was not possible to know God adequately in this life, but it was possible to love him, which made virtue far more important than knowledge.") "What has Aristotle to do with Christ?" (Note: A narrowing of Tertullian's "What has Athens to do with Jerusalem?")

They can deal with any text of scripture as with a nose of wax, and knead it into what shape best suits their interest.

— The Praise of Folly

Erasmus held that academics must avoid philosophical factionalism as an offence against Christian concord, to "make the whole world Christian". "Men are drawn to Godliness by a thousand means." Indeed, Erasmus warned that Scholastic philosophy actually could distract participants from their proper focus on immediate morality, (Note: "For I am ready to swear that Epimenides came to life again in Scotus." Erasmus to Thomas Grey Nichols, ep. 59; Allen, ep 64) unless used moderately, (Note: "Like Jean Gerson before him, he recommended that (scholastic method) be practised with greater moderation and that it be complemented by the new philological and patristic knowledge that was becoming available.") and by "excluding the Platonists from their commentaries, they strangle the beauty of revelation." (Note: "I find that in comparison with the Fathers of the Church our present-day theologians are a pathetic group. Most of them lack the elegance, the charm of language, and the style of the Fathers. Content with Aristotle, they treat the mysteries of revelation in the tangled fashion of the logician. Excluding the Platonists from their commentaries, they strangle the beauty of revelation." Enchiridion, Erasmus, cited by L. Markos) "They are windbags blown up with Aristotle, sausages stuffed with a mass of theoretical definitions, conclusions, and propositions." Duns Scotus, or his uninspiring proponents, generally came off even worse than Aquinas, nevertheless, despite his biting sharp comments, Erasmus paraded that he did not reject any medieval theologians totally, merely that he was championing the return to the fresh springs.

Nevertheless, Protestant church historian Ernst Kohls has commented on a certain closeness of Erasmus's thought to Thomas Aquinas', despite Erasmus's scepticism about runaway Aristotelianism and his methodological dislike of collections of disconnected sentences for quotation. Ultimately, Erasmus personally owned Aquinas' Summa theologiae, the Catena aurea and his commentary on Paul's epistles.

=== Philosophia Christi ===
Everything in the pagan world that was valiantly done, brilliantly said, ingeniously thought, diligently transmitted, had been prepared by Christ for his society.

— Erasmus, Antibarbari

(Not to be confused with his Italian contemporary Chrysostom Javelli's Philosophia Christiana.)

Erasmus approached classical philosophers theologically and rhetorically: their value was in how they pre-saged, explained or amplified the unique teachings of Christ (particularly the Sermon on the Mount): the philosophia Christi. (Note: A Lutheran view: "Philosophia christiana as taught by Erasmus has never been factual reality; wherever it was philosophia, it was not christiana; wherever it was christiana, it was not philosophia." Karl Barth)

A great part of the teaching of Christ is to be found in some of the philosophers, particularly Socrates, Diogenes and Epictetus. But Christ taught it much more fully, and exemplified it better ...

— Erasmus, Paraclesis

In fact, he said, Christ was "the very father of philosophy" (Anti-Barbieri). (Note: Similar to John Wycliffe's statement "the greatest philosopher is none other than Christ.") His characteristic combination of a Hellenic-informed Jesus whose teaching emphasis was on inter-personal relations more than abstract spiritual truths has been criticized e.g. by a view "however, Erasmus sought only what was human in the Sermon on the Mount, just as he found what was Christian in the moral philosophy of the Stoics."

In works such as his Enchiridion, The Education of a Christian Prince and the Colloquies, Erasmus developed his idea of the philosophia Christi, a life lived according to the teachings of Jesus taken as a spiritual-ethical-social-political-legal philosophy: (Note: Philosopher Étienne Gilson has noted "Confronted with the same failure of philosophy to rise above the order of formal logic, John of Salisbury between 1150 and 1180, Nicolas of Autrecourt and Petrach in 1360, Erasmus of Rotterdam around 1490, spontaneously conceived a similar method to save Christian faith", i.e. a sceptical-about-scholasticism ad-fontes religious moralism promoting peace and charity.)

Christ the heavenly teacher has founded a new people on earth, ... Having eyes without guile, these folk know no spite or envy; having freely castrated themselves, and aiming at a life of angels while in the flesh, they know no unchaste lust; they know not divorce, since there is no evil they will not endure or turn to the good; they have not the use of oaths, since they neither distrust nor deceive anyone; they know not the hunger for money, since their treasure is in heaven, nor do they itch for empty glory, since they refer all things to the glory of Christ.…these are the new teachings of our founder, such as no school of philosophy has ever brought forth.

— Erasmus, Method of True Theology

In philosopher Étienne Gilson's summary: "the quite precise goal he pursues is to reject Greek philosophy outside of Christianity, into which the Middle Ages introduced Greek philosophy with the risk of corrupting this Christian Wisdom."

Useful "philosophy" needed to be limited to (or re-defined as) the practical and moral:

You must realize that 'philosopher' does not mean someone who is clever at dialectics or science but someone who rejects illusory appearance and undauntedly seeks out and follows what is true and good. Being a philosopher is in practice the same as being a Christian; only the terminology is different.

— Erasmus, Anti-Barbieri

Biographers, such as Johan Huizinga, frequently draw connections between many of Erasmus's convictions and his early biography: esteem for the married state and appropriate marriages, support for priestly marriage, concern for improving marriage prospects for women, opposition to inconsiderate rules (notably, institutional dietary rules), a desire to make education engaging for the participants, interest in classical languages, horror of poverty and spiritual hopelessness, distaste for friars begging when they could study or work, unwillingness to be under the direct control of authorities, laicism, the need for those in authority to act in the best interest of their charges, a prizing of mercy and peace, an anger over unnecessary war, especially between avaricious princes, an awareness of mortality, the wisdom of avoiding danger, (Note: His earliest work, De contemptu mundi, recommended that a friend become a monk for reason of spiritual safety: he who loves danger will perish in it.) etc.

More than any other Renaissance ﬁgure, the humanist from the Low Countries was committed to the goal of building an alternative to medieval civilisation...As a rule, the ancient elements were essential to him, whereas he tended to discard most "recent" (that is, medieval) phenomena as superﬂuous or harmful.

— István Bejczy, Erasmus and the Middle Ages

"He was above all a popularizer, and he gloried in it. He was one of the main channels by which certain ideas entered the modern world, and his originality was in the blending of these ideas. His talent was for synthesis...it is not in any ordinary sense that he can be called an original thinker, but he was far too great to be a mere imitator or vulgarizer."

— Margaret Mann Phillips

=== Manner of thinking ===
Erasmus had a distinctive manner of thinking, a Catholic historian suggests: one that is capacious in its perception, agile in its judgements, and unsettling in its irony with "a deep and abiding commitment to human flourishing". "In all spheres, his outlook was essentially pastoral." He was an "incurable idealist". (Note: According to historian István Bejczy "Erasmus preferred, like many an incurable idealist, to project his optimistic expectations into the future: the eﬀects of Christian humanism in the ﬁeld of piety were only somewhat postponed through the opposition of monks and theologians on the one hand and Protestant troublemakers on the other, but history would deﬁnitely bring improvement on all fronts—partly as the outcome of a natural process but mainly because God would have it so and even used his detractors to this end. One day Christian civilisation would gather in all fruits of history.")

Erasmus has been called a seminal rather than a consistent or systematic thinker, notably averse to over-extending from the specific to the general, who nevertheless should be taken very seriously as a pastoral (Note: Historian Kirk Essary comments "Reading the work (Exomologesis), one is reminded that Erasmus remains underrated for his psychological insights in general and that he is perhaps overlooked as a pastoral theologian.") and rhetorical theologian, with a philological and historical approach—rather than a metaphysical approach—to interpreting Scripture (Note: For Erasmus, "dogmatics do not exist for themselves; they take on meaning only when they issue, on the one hand, in the exegesis of scripture and, on the other, in moral action" according to Manfred Hoffmann's Erkenntnis und Verwirklichung der wahren Theologie nach Erasmus von Rotterdam (1972).) and interested in the literal and tropological senses. French theologian Louis Bouyer commented, "Erasmus was to be one of those who can get no edification from exegesis where they suspect some misinterpretation."

A theologian has written of "Erasmus' preparedness completely to satisfy no-one but himself". He has been called moderate, judicious and constructive even when being critical or when mocking extremes; (Note: However, "his wit can be gentle; it can break out into bitterness. In controversy, resentments and anxieties can get loose, countermanding the Christian imperative of love to which he was devoted and which runs as a leitmotiv through all his writings." Mansfield) but thin-skinned against slanders of heterodoxy. (Note: "So thin- skinned that a fly would draw blood". Albert Pio, quoted in Encyclopedia Britannica.)

=== Manner of expression ===
==== Irony ====
Erasmus often wrote in a highly ironical idiom, especially in his letters, which makes them prone to different interpretations when taken literally rather than ironically.

- Ulrich von Hutten claimed that Erasmus was secretly a Lutheran; Erasmus chided him saying that von Hutten had not detected the irony in his public letters enough.
- Antagonistic scholar J. W. Williams denies that Erasmus's letter to Ammonius, "let your own interests be your standard in all things", was in apparent jest, as claimed by those more sympathetic to Erasmus.
- Erasmus's aphoristic quote on the persecution of Reuchlin, "If it is Christian to hate Jews, we are all abundantly Christians here", is taken literally by Theodor Dunkelgrün and Harry S. May as being approving of such hatred; the alternative view would be that it was sardonic and challenging.

He frequently wrote about controversial subjects using the dialogue to avoid direct statements clearly attributable to himself. (Note: "[...] of all Renaissance writers, Erasmus is the one who prefers the dialogue, with its avoidance of dogmatism, it balance and swing of debate, its insistence of friendship and communication.") For Martin Luther, he was an eel, slippery, evasive and impossible to capture.

==== Copiousness ====
Erasmus's literary theory of "copiousness" endorses a large stockpile of rich adages, analogies, tropes and symbolic figures, rather than using limited number of stock phrases. Copiousness allows the compressed communication of complex ideas (between those educated in the stockpile) but some of which, to modern sensibilities, may promote, rather than play off, stereotypes.

- Erasmus's lengthy collections of proverbs, the Adagia, established a vocabulary he and his contemporaries then used extensively and habitually: according to philosopher Heinz Kimmerle, it is necessary to know the explanations of various proverbs given by Erasmus's Adages to adequately understand many passages in Erasmus's and Luther's written debate on free will (see below).
- When Erasmus wrote of 'Judaism', he most frequently (though not always) was not referring to Jews: (Note: For Markish, Erasmus's "theological opposition to a form of religious thought which he identified with Judaism was not translated into crude prejudice against actual Jews", to the extent that Erasmus could be described as 'a-semitic' rather than 'anti-semitic'.) instead he referred to those Catholic Christians of his time, especially in the monastic lifestyle, who mistakenly promoted excessive external ritualism over interior piety, by analogy with Second Temple Judaism.
  - "Judaism I call not Jewish impiety, but prescriptions about external things, such as food, fasting, clothes, which to a certain degree resemble the rituals of the Jews."
  - Erasmus's counter-accusation to Spanish friars of "Judaizing" may have been particularly sharp and bold, given the prominent role that some friars with the Spanish Inquisition were playing in the lethal persecution of some conversos. (Note: Historian Kevin Ingram suggests "The conversos also clearly reveled in Erasmus's comparison, in the Enchiridion, of Old-Christians mired in ceremonial practice to Pharisees who had forgotten the true message of Judaism, a statement they used as a counter-punch against Old-Christian accusations of converso Judaizing. The conversos conveniently ignored the anti-semitic aspect of Erasmus's statement.")

Terence J. Martin identifies an "Erasmian pattern" that the supposed (by the reader) otherness (of Turks, Lapplanders, Indians, Amerindians, (Note: "Erasmus discussed Amerindians and their way of life only as a tool, an analogy or parable, for those issues that consistently preoccupied his mind, namely the mores of the Christian Church.") Jews, and even women and heretics) "provides a foil against which the failures of Christian culture can be exposed and criticized."

- In a 1518 letter to John Fisher, Erasmus wrote: "The cunning of princes and the effrontery of the Roman curia can go no further; and it looks as though the state of the common people would soon be such that the tyranny of the Grand Turk would be more bearable."
- In De bello Turcico, Erasmus personifies that we should "kill the Turk, not the man.[...] If we really want to heave the Turks from our necks, we must first expel from our hearts a more loathsome race of Turks: avarice, ambition, the craving for power, self-satisfaction, impiety, extravagance, the love of pleasure, deceitfulness, anger, hatred, envy." (Note: Erasmus, De bello Turcico, cited by Ron, Nathan, The Non-Cosmopolitan Erasmus: An Examination of his Turkophobic/Islamophobic Rhetoric, op. cit. p 99: Ron takes this as an affirmation by Erasmus of the low nature of Turks; the alternative view would take it as a negative foil (applying the model of the parable of The Mote and the Beam) where the prejudice is appropriated to subvert it.)

=== Pacifism ===
Peace, peaceableness, and peacemaking, in all spheres from the domestic to the religious to the political, were central distinctives (though with solid precedents) (Note: See for example Jean Gerson's sermon Apparuit gratia dei, delivered before the Pope, paraphrased as "Peace is the goal of the ecclesiastical institution. ... If a law is discovered to be in conflict with the establishment or maintenance of peace, it must be ... either interpreted in a way that it could promote peace or be simply abolished.") of Erasmus's writing on Christian living and his mystical theology: "the sum and summary of our religion is peace and unanimity". (Note: Summa nostrae religionis pax est et unanimitas. Erasmus continued: "This can hardly remain the case unless we define as few matters as possible and leave each individual's judgement free on many questions." Note that the use of summa is perhaps also a backhanded reference to the scholastic summa, which he upbraided for their moral and spiritual uselessness.) At the Nativity of Jesus "the angels sang not the glories of war, nor a song of triumph, but a hymn of peace":

He (Christ) conquered by gentleness; He conquered by kindness; he conquered by truth itself. [...] Long ago, he was called God of Powers, the 'Lord of Hosts/Armies'; for us he is called 'God of Peace'.

— Method of True Theology, 4 (Note: "Latin: Vicit mansuetudine, vicit beneficentia". R. Sider translates vicit as "he prevailed".)

Erasmus was not an absolute pacifist but promoted political pacificism and religious Irenicism. Notable writings on irenicism include De Concordia, On the War with the Turks, The Education of a Christian Prince, On Restoring the Concord of the Church, and The Complaint of Peace. Erasmus's ecclesiology of peacemaking held that the church authorities (Note: Bruce Mansfield summarises historian Georg Gebhart's view: "While recognizing the teaching authority, but not the primacy, of Councils, Erasmus adopted a moderaTe Papalism, papal authority itself being essentially pastoral.") had a divine mandate to settle religious disputes, (Note: This was not a naive or far-fetched role: historian Timothy Martin notes that in France around year 1000 "The influence of the Church, which was led by local bishops, who were often members of the region's nobility, became pivotal in restraining the rampant fighting between knights and the pillaging of Church lands and the peasantry. Several examples show that it was the bishop, backed by abbots and sacred relics, preaching a warning of eternal damnation for violators, that most often compelled the local warlords and knights into submission.") in an as non-excluding way as possible, including by the preferably-minimal development of doctrine. It was especially important that princes be educated to be wise, because of the ease with which new rulers slip into wars for adventure or on impulse: Erasmus is direct: "What is a mistake in other people is a crime in the prince."

In The Complaint of Peace, Lady Peace insists on peace as the crux of Christian life and for understanding Christ:

"I give you my peace, I leave you my peace" (John 14:27). You hear what he leaves his people? Not horses, bodyguards, empire or riches – none of these. What then? He gives peace, leaves peace – peace with friends, peace with enemies.

— The Complaint of Peace

A historian has called him "The 16th Century's Pioneer of Peace Education and a Culture of Peace". (Note: If any single individual in the modern world can be credited with "the invention of peace", the honour belongs to Erasmus rather than Kant whose essay on perpetual peace was published nearly three centuries later.)

Erasmus's emphasis on peacemaking reflects a typical pre-occupation of medieval lay spirituality as historian John Bossy (as summarised by Eamon Duffy) puts it: "medieval Christianity had been fundamentally concerned with the creation and maintenance of peace in a violent world. 'Christianity' in medieval Europe denoted neither an ideology nor an institution, but a community of believers whose religious ideal—constantly aspired to if seldom attained—was peace and mutual love."

==== War ====
Historians have written that "references to conflict run like a red thread through the writings of Erasmus". Erasmus had a simple view of the renaissance state, where ultimately warfare was determined by single individuals: sovereign rulers (i.e. pope, emperor, king, duke, etc.) with malformed ambitions; so directing sovereigns towards inter-Christendom pacifism was thus a key practical prescription for peace, which in turn required a new curriculum for educating princes that did not encourage vainglorious milititarism. (Note: One of the first princely curricula to be influenced was that of the teenage Prince Henry, later Henry VIII.)

Erasmus had experienced war as a child and was particularly concerned about wars between Christian kings, who should be brothers and not start wars; a theme in his book The Education of a Christian Prince. The longest entry in his Adages was #3,001 "War is sweet to those who have never tasted it" (Dulce bellum inexpertis from Pindar's Greek). (Note: "The argument of Bellum is governed by three favourite themes that recur in other works of Erasmus. First, war is naturally wrong [...] Second, Christianity forbids war [...] Third, 'just cause' in war will be claimed by both sides and will be next to impossible to determine fairly: hence, the traditional criteria of the just war are nonfunctional.")

He promoted and was present at the Field of Cloth of Gold, and his wide-ranging correspondence frequently related to issues of peacemaking. (Note: "Desiderius Erasmus, Thomas More and John Colet [...] between them in the first three decades of the sixteenth century, ushered in not only humanism – an ethically sanctioned guide for practical, humanitarian ways of living in society – but also the formation of a group that might be called a 'peace movement'.") He saw a key role of the Church in peacemaking by arbitration and mediation, and the office of the Pope was necessary to rein in tyrannical princes and bishops.

He questioned the practical usefulness and abuses (Note: "I do not deny that I wrote some harsh things in order to deter the Christians from the madness of war, because I saw that these wars, which we witnessed for too many years, are the source of the biggest part of evils which damage Christendom. Therefore, it was necessary to come forward not only against these deeds, which are clearly criminal, but also against other actions, which are almost impossible to do without committing many crimes." Apology against Albert Pío) of just war theory, further limiting it to feasible defensive actions with popular support and that "war should never be undertaken unless, as a last resort, it cannot be avoided". Appeasement should be considered. Defeat should be endured rather than fighting to the end. In his Adages he discusses (common translation) "A disadvantageous peace is better than a just war", which owes to Cicero and John Colet's "Better an unjust peace than the justest war." Expansionism could not be justified. (Note: "Erasmus and Vives ruled out conquests and annexation of territories.") Taxes to pay for war should cause the least possible hardship on the poor.

He hated sedition as, often, an excuse or cause of oppression.

Erasmus was highly critical of the warlike way of important European princes of his era, including some princes of the church. (Note: Erasmus was not out of step with opinion within the church: Archbishop Bernard II Zinni of Split speaking at the Fifth Council of the Lateran (1512) denounced princes as the most guilty of ambition, luxury and a desire for domination. Bernard proposed that reformation must primarily involve ending war and schism.) He described these princes as corrupt and greedy. Erasmus believed that these princes "collude in a game, of which the outcome is to exhaust and oppress the commonwealth". Further, "'When princes purpose to exhaust a commonwealth, they speak of a just war; when they unite for that object, they call it peace." He spoke more freely about this matter in letters sent to his friends like Thomas More, Beatus Rhenanus and Adrianus Barlandus: a particular target of his criticisms was the Emperor Maximilian I, whom Erasmus blamed for allegedly preventing the Netherlands from signing a peace treaty with Guelders and other schemes to cause wars to extract money from his subjects. (Note: James D. Tracy notes that mistrust of the Habsburg government in the general population (partially due to the fact Maximilian and his grandson Charles V were absentee rulers, the secret nature of diplomacy and other circumstances) was widespread, but it is notable that intellectuals like Erasmus and Barlandus also accepted the allegations.)

One of his approaches was to send and publish congratulatory and lionising letters to princes who, though in a position of strength, negotiated peace with neighbours, such as King Sigismund I the Old of Poland in 1527.

Erasmus "constantly and consistently" opposed the mooted idea of a Christian "universal monarch" with an over-extended empire who could supposedly defeat the Ottoman forces: such universalism did not "hold any promise of generating less conflict than the existing political plurality"; instead, advocating concord between princes, both temporal and spiritual. The spiritual princes, by their arbitration and mediation do not "threaten political plurality, but acts as its defender."

==== Intra-Christian religious toleration ====
He referred to his irenical disposition in the Preface to On Free Will as a "secret inclination of nature" that would make him even prefer the views of the Sceptics over intolerant assertions, though he sharply distinguished adiaphora from what was uncontentiously explicit in the New Testament or absolutely mandated by Church teaching. Concord demanded unity and assent: Erasmus was anti-sectarian (Note: "I have made my support of the church sufficiently clear [...] The only thing in which I take pride is that I have never committed myself to any sect." Erasmus, Letter to Georgius Agricola (1534)) as well as non-sectarian. To follow the law of love, our intellects must be humble and friendly when making any assertions: he called contention "earthly, beastly, demonic" and a good-enough reason to reject a teacher or their followers. In Melanchthon's view, Erasmus taught charity, not faith. The centrality of Christian concord to Erasmus's theology contrasted with the insistence of Martin Luther and, for example, later English Puritans, that (Protestant) truth naturally would create discord and opposition.

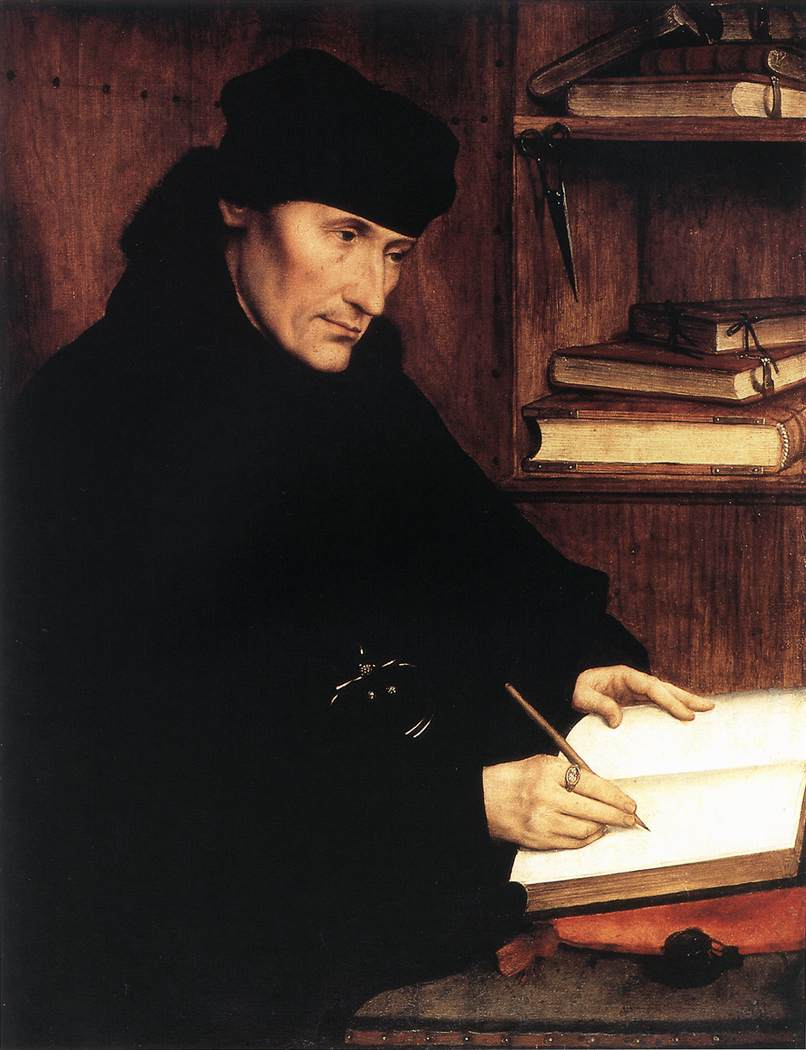
Portrait of Erasmus, after Quinten Massijs (1517)

Certain works of Erasmus laid a foundation for religious toleration of private opinions and ecumenism. For example, in De libero arbitrio, opposing particular views of Martin Luther, Erasmus noted that religious disputants should be temperate in their language "because in this way the truth, which is often lost amidst too much wrangling may be more surely perceived". Gary Remer writes, "Like Cicero, Erasmus concludes that truth is furthered by a more harmonious relationship between interlocutors."

In a letter to Cardinal Lorenzo Campeggio, Erasmus lobbied diplomatically for toleration: "If the sects could be tolerated under certain conditions (as the Bohemians pretend), it would, I admit, be a grievous misfortune, but one more endurable than war." But the same dedication to avoiding conflict and bloodshed should be shown by those tempted to join (anti-popist) sects:

Perhaps evil rulers should sometimes be tolerated. We owe some respect to the memory of those whose places we think of them as occupying. Their titles have some claim on us. We should not seek to put matters right if there is a real possibility that the cure may prove worse than the disease.

— Erasmus, The Sileni of Alcibiades (1517)

==== Heresy and sedition ====
Erasmus had been privately involved in early attempts to protect Luther and his sympathisers from charges of heresy. Erasmus wrote Inquisitio de fide to say that the Lutherans (of 1523) were not formally heretics: he pushed back against the willingness of some theologians to cry heresy fast in order to enforce their views in universities and at inquisitions.

For Erasmus, punishable heresy had to involve fractiously, dangerously, and publicly agitating against essential doctrines relating to Christ (i.e., blasphemy), with malice, depravity, obstinacy. (Note: Historian Johannes Trapman notes "But who are in fact heretics? According to Erasmus not somebody who doubts a minor doctrinal point or even errs in some article. [...] For the protection of the commonwealth [...] heretics who are not only blasphemous but also seditious deserve the death penalty." Erasmus commended that the punishment of the early church for heresy was excommunication.) As with St Theodore the Studite, Erasmus was against the death penalty merely for private or peaceable heresy or for dissent on non-essentials: "It is better to cure a sick man than to kill him." The Church, he said, has the duty to protect believers and convert or heal heretics; he invoked Jesus' parable of the wheat and tares.

Erasmus's pacificism included a particular dislike for sedition, which caused warfare:

It was the duty of the leaders of this [reforming] movement, if Christ was their goal, to refrain not only from vice, but even from every appearance of evil; and to offer not the slightest stumbling block to the Gospel, studiously avoiding even practices which, although allowed, are yet not expedient. Above all they should have guarded against all sedition.

— Letter to Martin Bucer

Erasmus allowed the death penalty against violent seditionists to prevent bloodshed and war: he allowed that the state has the right to execute those who are a necessary danger to public order—whether heretic or orthodox—but noted (e.g., to Natalis Beda) that Augustine had been against the execution of even violent Donatists: Johannes Trapman states that Erasmus's endorsement of suppression of the Anabaptists springs from their refusal to heed magistrates and the criminal violence of the Münster rebellion, not because of their heretical views on baptism. Despite these concessions to state power, Erasmus suggested that religious persecution could still be challenged as inexpedient (ineffective).

==== Outsiders ====
Most of his political writing focused on peace within Christendom with almost a sole focus on Europe. In 1516, Erasmus wrote, "It is the part of a Christian prince to regard no one as an outsider unless he is a nonbeliever, and even on them he should inflict no harm", which entails not attacking outsiders, not taking their riches, not subjecting them to political rule, no forced conversions, and keeping promises made to them.

In common with his times, Erasmus regarded the Jewish and Islamic religions as Christian heresies (and therefore competitors to orthodox Christianity) rather than separate religions, using the inclusive term half-Christian for the latter. (Note: "... in large part half-Christian and perhaps nearer to true Christianity than most of our own folk." Letter to Paul Volz)

However, there is a wide range of scholarly opinion on the extent and nature of antisemitic and anti-Muslim prejudice in his writings: historian Nathan Ron has found his writing to be harsh and racial in its implications, with contempt and hostility to Islam.

===== Turks =====
In his last decade, he involved himself in the public policy debate on war with the Ottoman Empire, which was then invading Western Europe, notably in his book On the war against the Turks (1530), as the "reckless and extravagant" Pope Leo X had in previous decades promoted going on the offensive with a new crusade. Erasmus reworked Luther's rhetoric that the invading Turks represent God's judgement of decadent Christendom, but without Luther's fatalism: Erasmus not only accused Western leaders of kingdom-threatening hypocrisy, he reworked a remedy already decreed by the Fifth Council of the Lateran: anti-expansionist moral reforms by Europe's disunited leaders as a necessary unitive political step before any aggressive warfare against the Ottoman threat, reforms which might themselves, if sincere, prevent both the internecine and foreign warfare. (Note: The idea that European peace and order was a precondition for successful crusades has a longer history: Pope Urban II at the Council of Clermont in 1095 called for the re-enacting of the Truce of God for domestic peace.)

===== Jews =====
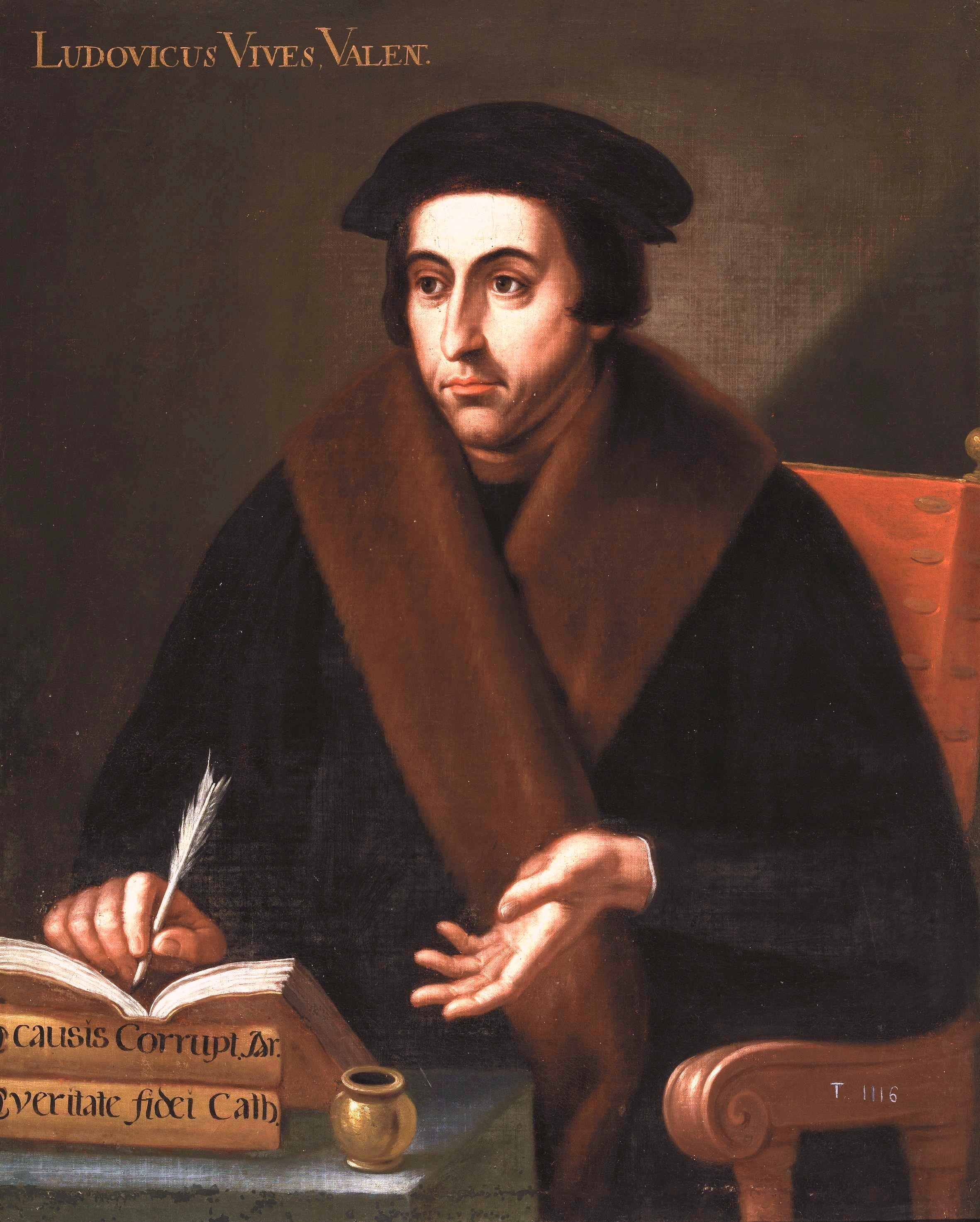
Juan Luis Vives

Erasmus perceived and championed strong Hellenistic rather than exclusively Hebraic influences on the intellectual milieux of Jesus, Paul, and the early church: "If only the Christian church did not attach so much importance to the Old Testament!" (Note: "If only the Christian church did not attach so much importance to the Old Testament! It is a thing of shadows, given us for a time." Ep 798 p. 305. For Erasmus, "the relative importance we should ascribe to the different books of the Bible" accorded to how much "they bring us more or less directly to knowledge of (Christ)", which gave priority to the New Testament and the Gospels in particular. "To Erasmus, Judaism was obsolete. To Reuchlin, something of Judaism remained of continuing value to Christianity.") Perhaps the only Jewish book he published was his loose translation of the first century Hellenistic-Judaic On the Sovereignty of Reason, better known as 4 Maccabees.

Erasmus's pervasive anti-ceremonialism treated the early Church debates on circumcision, food, and special days as manifestations of cultural chauvinism by the initial Jewish Christians in Antioch. (Note: "The Jews" (i.e. the earliest Jewish Christians in Antioch) "because of a certain human tendency, desire(d) to force their own rites upon everyone, clearly in order under this pretext to enhance their own importance. For each one wishes that the things which he himself has taught should appear as outstanding." Erasmus, Paraphrase of Romans and Galatians)

While many humanists, from Pico della Mirandola to Johannes Reuchlin, were intrigued by Jewish mysticism, Erasmus came to dislike it: "I see them as a nation full of most tedious fabrications, who spread a kind of fog over everything, Talmud, Cabbala, Tetragrammaton, Gates of Light, words, words, words. I would rather have Christ mixed up with Scotus than with that rubbish of theirs."

In his Paraphrase on Romans, Erasmus voiced, as Paul, the "secret" that in the end times, "all of the Israelites will be restored to salvation" and accept Christ as their Messiah, "although now part of them have fallen away from it".

Several scholars have identified cases where Erasmus's comments appear to go beyond theological anti-Judaism into slurs or approving certain anti-semitic policies, though there is some controversy.

===== Slaves =====
On the subject of slavery, Erasmus characteristically treated it in passing under the topic of tyranny: Christians were not allowed to be tyrants, which slave-owning required, but especially not to be the masters of other Christians. Erasmus had various other piecemeal arguments against slavery: for example, that it was not legitimate to enslave people taken in an unjust war; but it was not a subject that occupied him. However, his belief that "nature created all men free" (and slavery was imposed) was a rejection of Aristotle's category of natural slaves.

==== Politics ====
Erasmus promoted the idea that a prince rules with the consent of his people, notably in his book The Education of a Christian Prince (and, through More, in the book Utopia, which proposed a "republic completely lacking sovereignty"). He may have been influenced by the Brabantine custom of an incoming ruler being officially told of his duties and welcomed: the Joyous Entry was a kind of contract. A monarchy should not be absolute: it should be "checked and diluted with a mixture of aristocracy and democracy to prevent it ever breaking out into tyranny". The same considerations applied to church princes.

Erasmus contrasts the Christian Prince with the Tyrant, who has no love from the people, will be surrounded by flatterers, and can expect no loyalty or peace. Unspoken in Erasmus's views may have been the idea that the people can remove a tyrant; however, espousing this explicitly could expose people to capital charges of sedition or treason. Erasmus typically limited his political discussion to what could be couched as personal faith and morality by or between Christians, his business as a doctor of theology.

He produced a Latin edition of Plutarch's "How to tell a flatterer from a friend" (Πῶς ἄν τις διακρίνειε τὸν κόλακα τοῦ φίλου) with an introductory dedication to Henry VIII, humorously over-praising Henry while raising the serious concern.

== Legacy ==
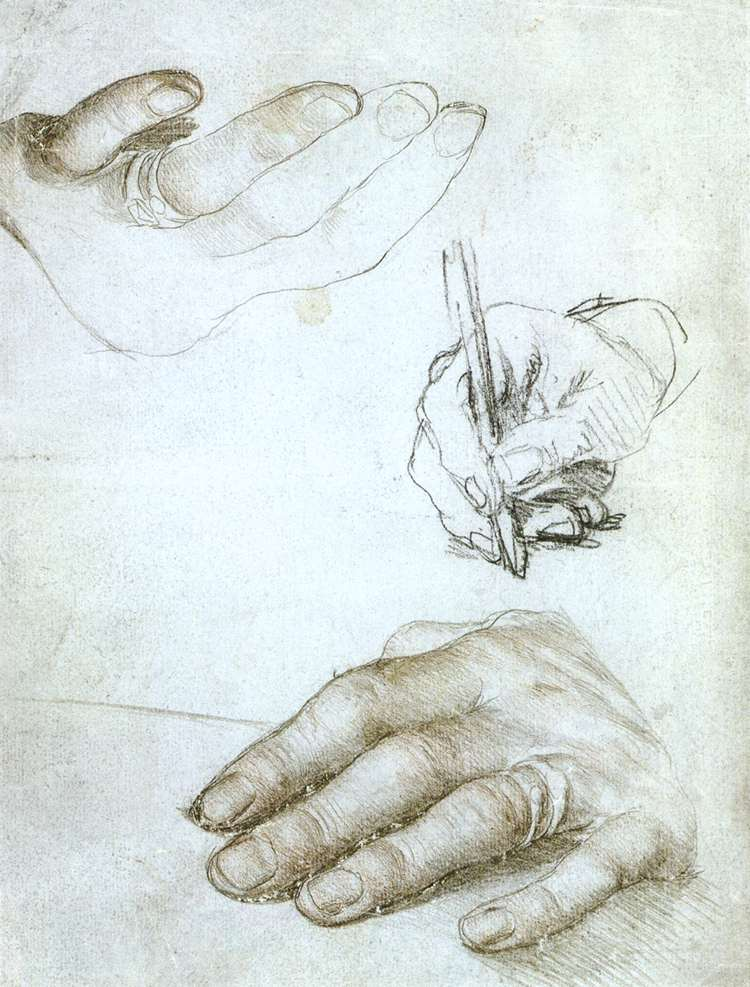
Holbein's studies of Erasmus's hands, in silverpoint and chalks, ca. 1523 (Louvre)

Since the origin of Christianity there have been perhaps only two other men—St Augustine and Voltaire—whose influence can be paralleled with Erasmus.

— W.S. Lily, Renaissance Types

Erasmus was much later given the sobriquet "Prince of the Humanists", and has been called "the crowning glory of the Christian humanists". He has also been called "the most illustrious rhetorician and educationalist of the Renaissance".

By the 1570s, "Everyone had assimilated Erasmus to one extent or another."

— Christophe Ocker

However, at times he has been viciously criticised, his works suppressed, his expertise corralled, his writings misinterpreted, his thought demonised, and his legacy marginalised. He was never judged and declared a heretic by the Catholic Church, during his lifetime or after: a semi-secret trial in Vallodolid Spain, in 1527 found him not to be a heretic, and he was sponsored and protected by Popes and Bishops. In 1531 the prestigious theology faculty of the University of Paris censured over 100 propositions they claimed were in his writings, however he denied the accuracy of the interpretations and the logic of the conclusions.

=== Exhumation ===
In 1928, the site of Erasmus's grave was dug up, and a body identified in the bones and examined. In 1974, remains were dug up in a slightly different location, accompanied by an Erasmus medal. Both remains have been claimed to be Erasmus'. However, it is possible neither is. The first bones were taller than expected and syphilitic; the second fitted the reported size and age but were accidentally smashed during photography.

== Personal ==
=== Name used ===
- The European Erasmus Programme of exchange students within the European Union is named after him.
  - The original Erasmus Programme scholarships enable European students to spend up to a year of their university courses in a university in another European country, commemorating Erasmus's impulse to travel.
  - The European Union cites the successor Erasmus+ programme as a "key achievement": "Almost 640,000 people studied, trained or volunteered abroad in 2020."
  - The parallel Erasmus Mundus project is aimed at attracting non-European students to study in Europe.
- The Erasmus Prize is one of Europe's foremost recognitions for culture, society or social science. It was won by Wikipedia in 2015.
- The Erasmus Lectures are an annual lecture on religious subjects, given by prominent Christian (mainly Catholic) and Jewish intellectuals, most notably by Joseph Ratzinger in 1988.
- A peer-reviewed annual scholarly journal Erasmus Studies has been produced since 1981.
- Rotterdam has the Erasmus University Rotterdam:
  - It has the Erasmus Institute for Philosophy and Economics (EIPE), which produces the Erasmus Journal of Philosophy and Economics
  - Erasmus University College is an "international, interdisciplinary Bachelor of Science programme in Liberal Arts and Sciences."
- From 1997 to 2008, the American University of Notre Dame had an Erasmus Institute.
- The Erasmus Building in Luxembourg was completed in 1988 as the first addition to the headquarters of the Court of Justice of the European Union (CJEU). The building houses the chambers of the judges of the CJEU's General Court and three courtrooms. It is next to the Thomas More Building.
- Rotterdam has an Erasmus Bridge.
- Queens' College, Cambridge, has an Erasmus Tower, Erasmus Building and an Erasmus Room. Until the early 20th century, Queens' College used to have a corkscrew that was purported to be "Erasmus's corkscrew", which was a third of a metre long; as of 1987, the college still had what it calls "Erasmus's chair".
- Several schools, faculties and universities in the Netherlands and Belgium are named after him, as is Erasmus Hall in Brooklyn, New York, US.

=== Health ===
Erasmus was a quite sickly man and frequently worked from his sickbed. As a teenager he contracted Quartan fever, a non-lethal type of malaria which recurred numerous times for the rest of his life: he attributed his survival to the intercession of St Genevieve. His digestion gave him trouble: he was intolerant of fish, beer and some wines, which were the standard diet for members of religious orders; he eventually died following an attack of dysentery.

In Cambridge he was ill, possibly with the English sweating sickness. He suffered kidney stones from his time in Venice and, in late life, with gout In 1514, he suffered a fall from his horse and injured his back.

In 1528 he suffered recurrent episodes of the stone, "from which he almost died." In 1529 his self-removal from Basel was delayed because of headcold and fever. In 1530 while travelling he suffered some near-fatal illness which several doctors diagnosed as the plague (which had killed his parents) but several others diagnosed as not the plague.

Various illnesses have been diagnosed of the skeletons claimed to be his, including pustulotic arthro-osteitis, syphilis or yaws. Other doctors have diagnosed from his written descriptions ailments such as rheumatoid arthritis, enteric rheumatism and spondylarthritis.

=== Clothing ===
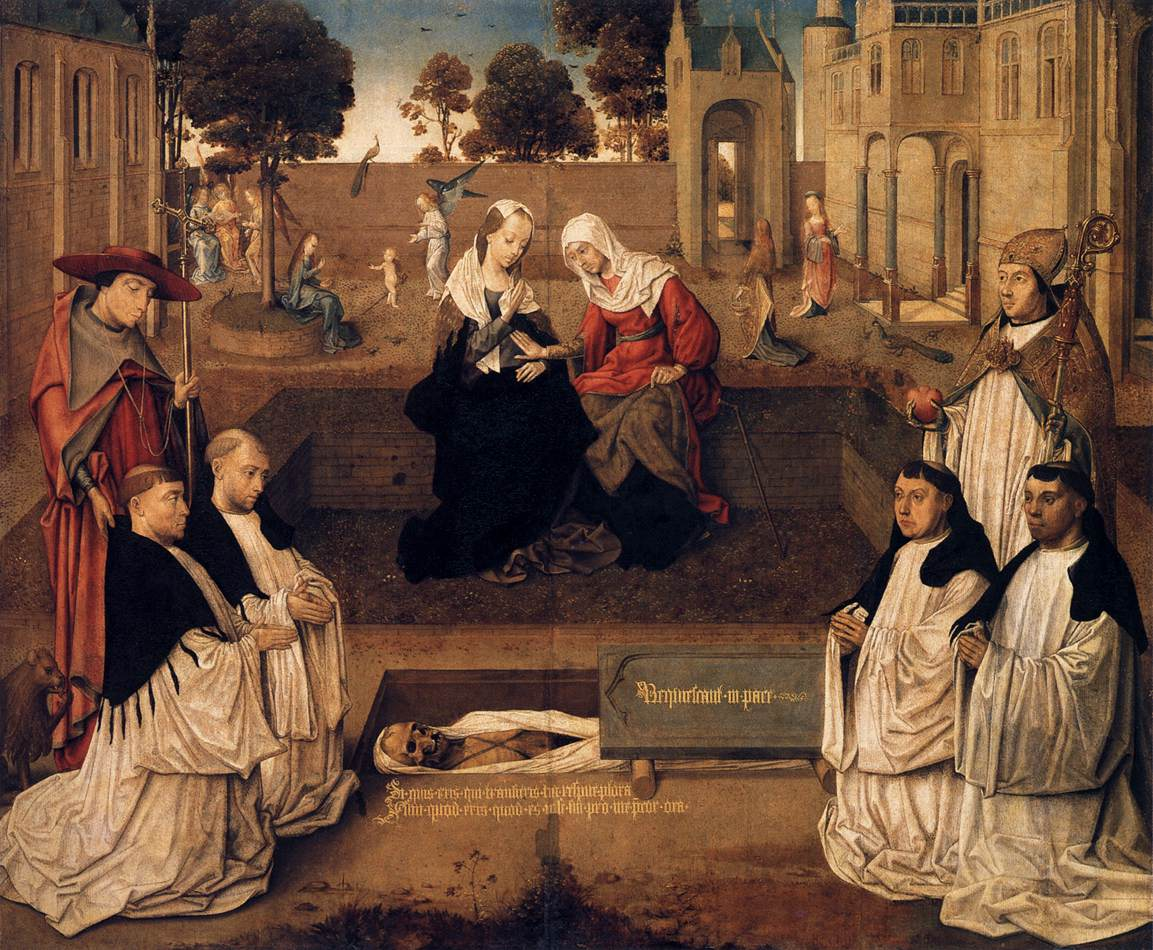
Visitation Momento mori, painter unknown, c.1500, juxtaposing pregnancy and death, with four Augustinan canons regular of the Chapter (Abbey) of Sion. Left, with a little lion behind him, is St Jerome; right, holding a heart, is St Augustine. Rijksmuseum, Amsterdam

Until Erasmus received his 1505 and 1517 Papal dispensations to wear clerical garb, he wore versions of the local habit of his order, the Canons regular of St Augustine, Chapter of Sion, which varied by region and house, unless travelling: in general, a white or perhaps black cassock with linen and lace choir rochet for liturgical contexts, or otherwise with white sarotium (scarf) (over left shoulder), or almuce (cape), perhaps with an asymmetrical black cope of cloth or sheepskin (Latin: cacullae) or long black cloak.

From 1505, and certainly after 1517, he dressed as a scholar-priest. He preferred warm and soft garments: according to one source, he arranged for his clothing to be stuffed with fur to protect him against the cold, and his habit counted with a collar of fur which usually covered his nape.

All Erasmus's portraits show him wearing a knitted scholar's bonnet.

=== Signet ring and personal motto ===
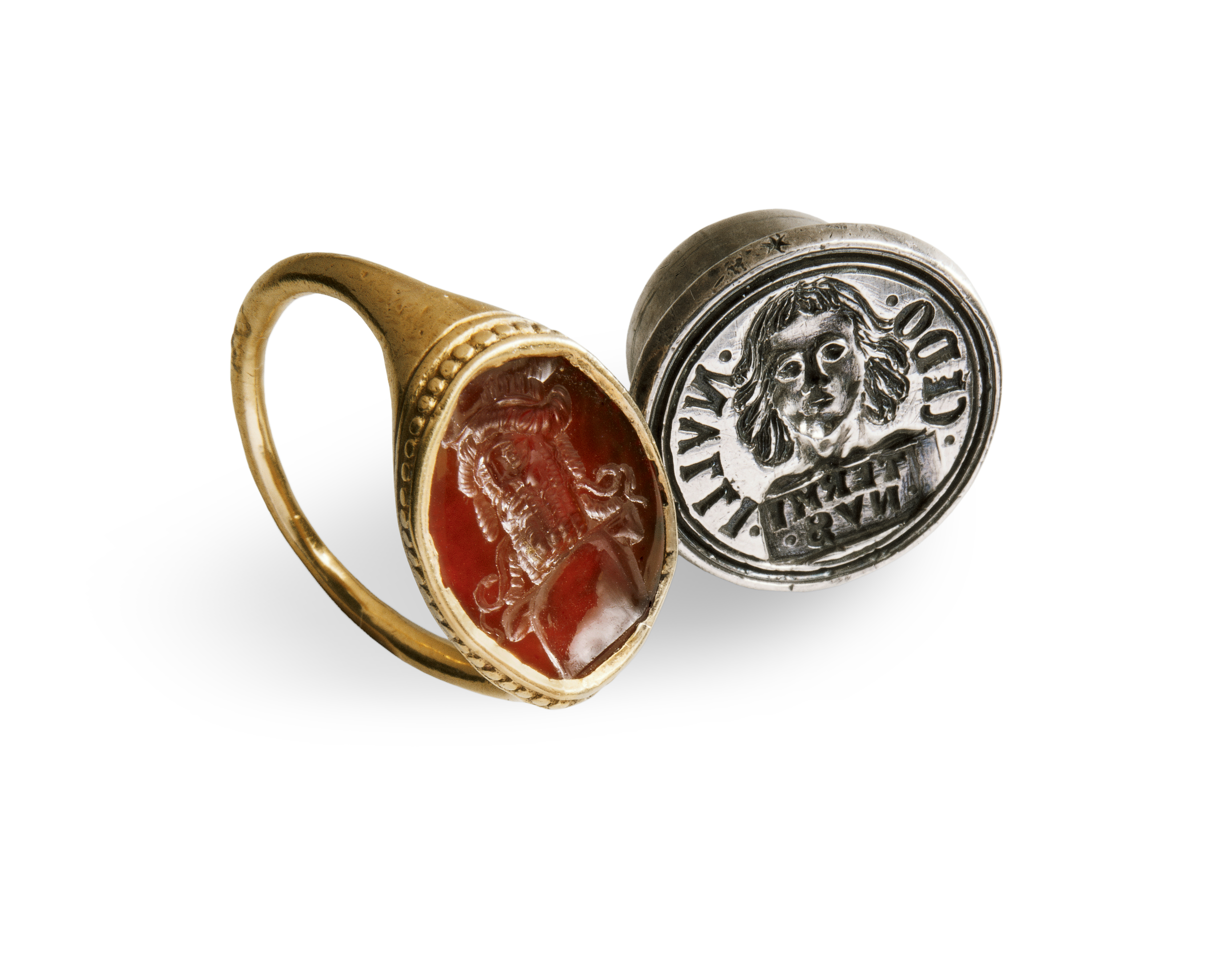
Signet rings of Erasmus of Rotterdam: Amerbach Kabinett

Erasmus chose the Roman god of borders and boundaries Terminus as a personal symbol and had a signet ring with a herm he thought depicted Terminus carved into a carnelian. The herm was presented to him in Rome by his student Alexander Stewart and in reality depicted the Greek god Dionysus. The ring was also depicted in a portrait of his by the Flemish painter Quentin Matsys.

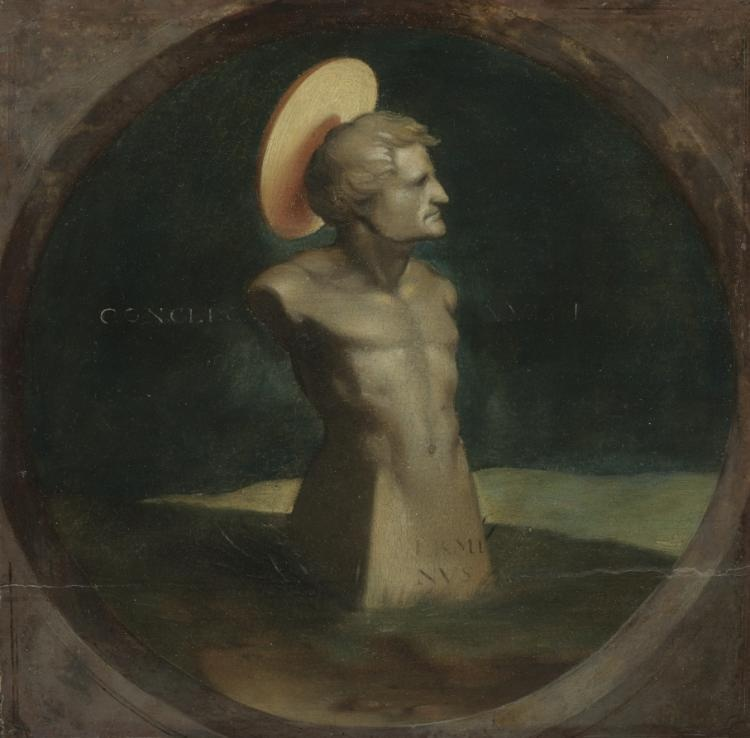
Painting of Erasmus as Terminus by Hans Holbein the Younger

The herm became part of the Erasmus branding at Froben, and is on his tombstone. In the early 1530s, Erasmus was portrayed as Terminus by Hans Holbein the Younger.

The diamond ring Erasmus wears in the famous Holbein portrait was a gift from his long-time friend and correspondent, Cardinal Lorenzo Campeggio, as a "memorial of our friendship" ("amicitiae nostrae noμνημόσυνον").

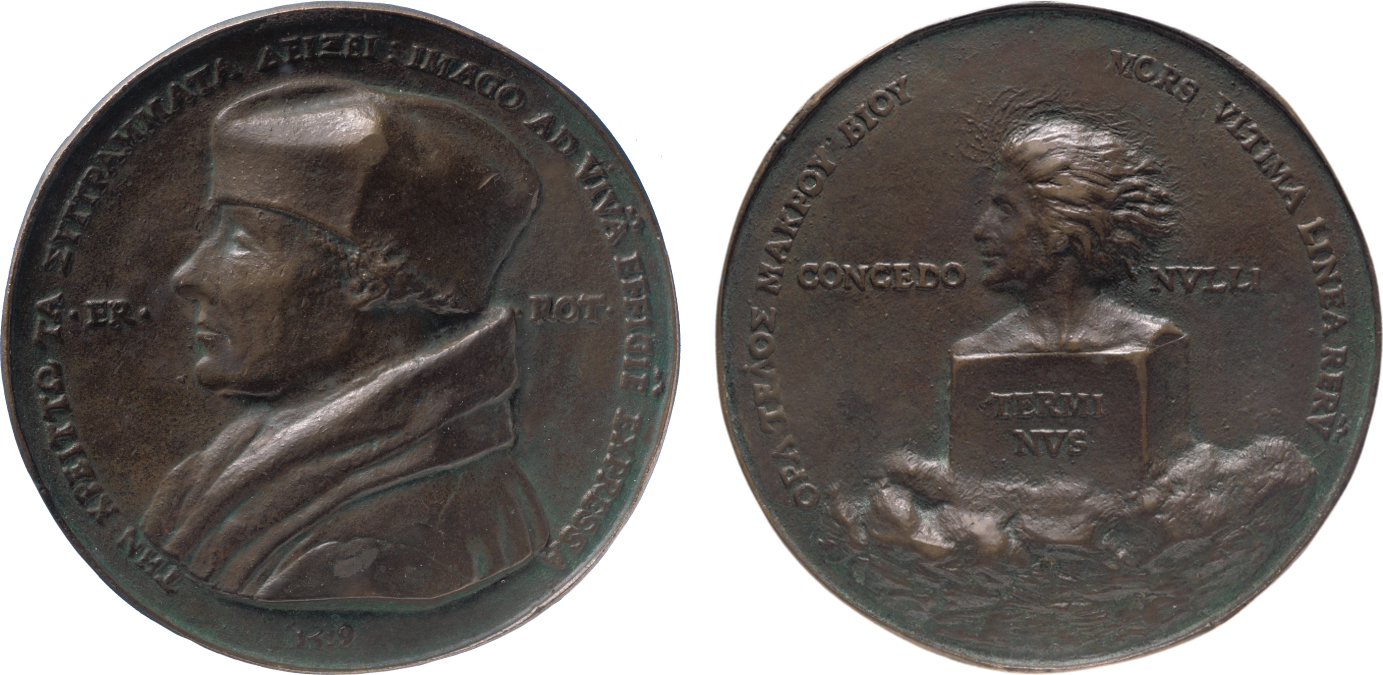
Quinten Metsys (Massijs), medal commissioned by Desiderius Erasmus. 1519, bronze, 105 mm

He chose Concedo Nulli ("I concede to no-one") as his personal motto. The obverse of the medal by Quintin Matsys featured the Terminus herm. Mottoes on medals, along the circumference, included "A better picture of Erasmus is shown in his writing", and "Contemplate the end of a long life" and Horace's "Death is the ultimate boundary of things," which re-casts the motto as a memento mori. There were anachronistic claims that his motto was a favourable nod to Luther's "Here I stand" which Erasmus denied.

== In popular culture ==
=== Visual representations ===
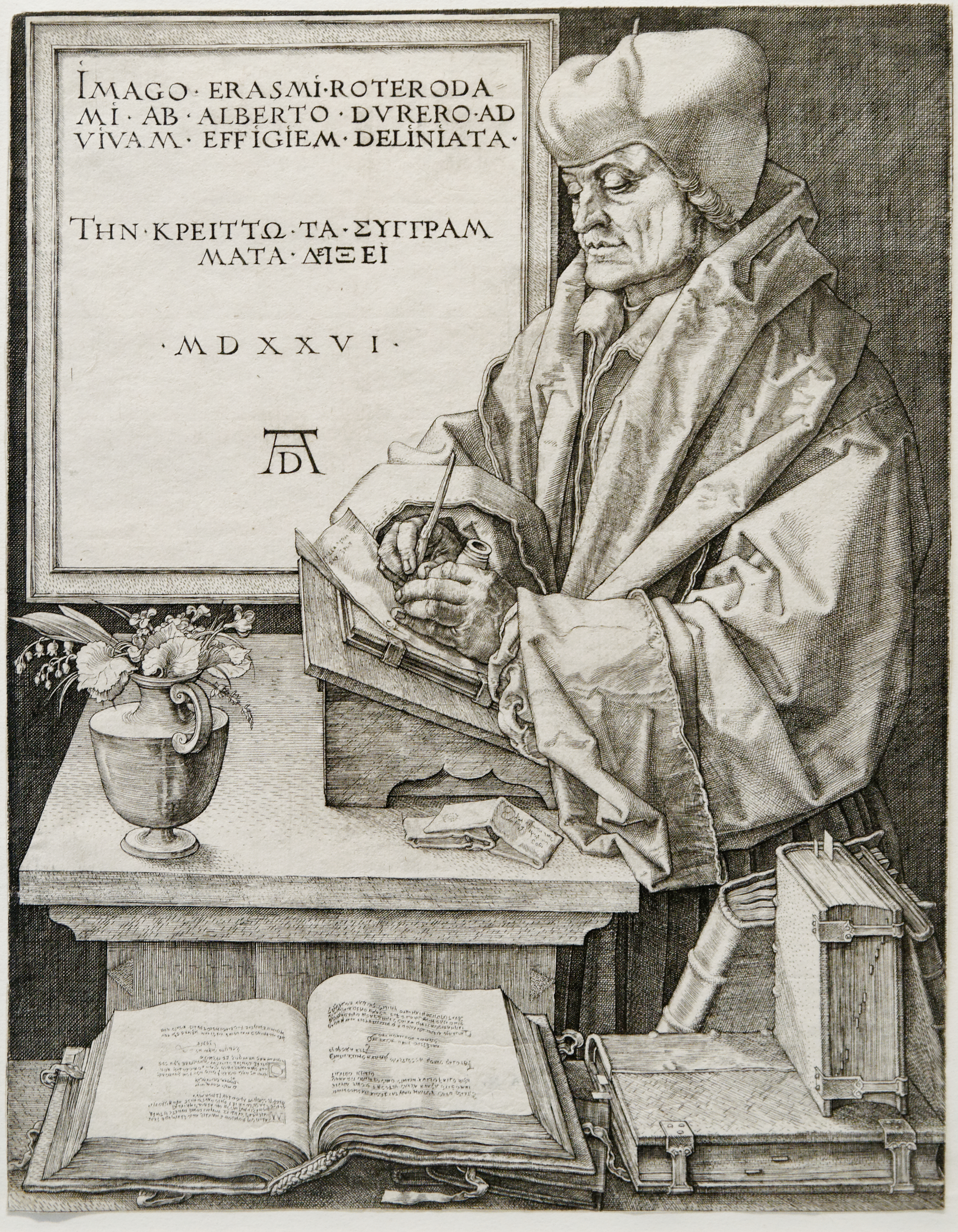
Portrait of Desiderius Erasmus by Albrecht Dürer, 1526, engraved in Nuremberg, Germany

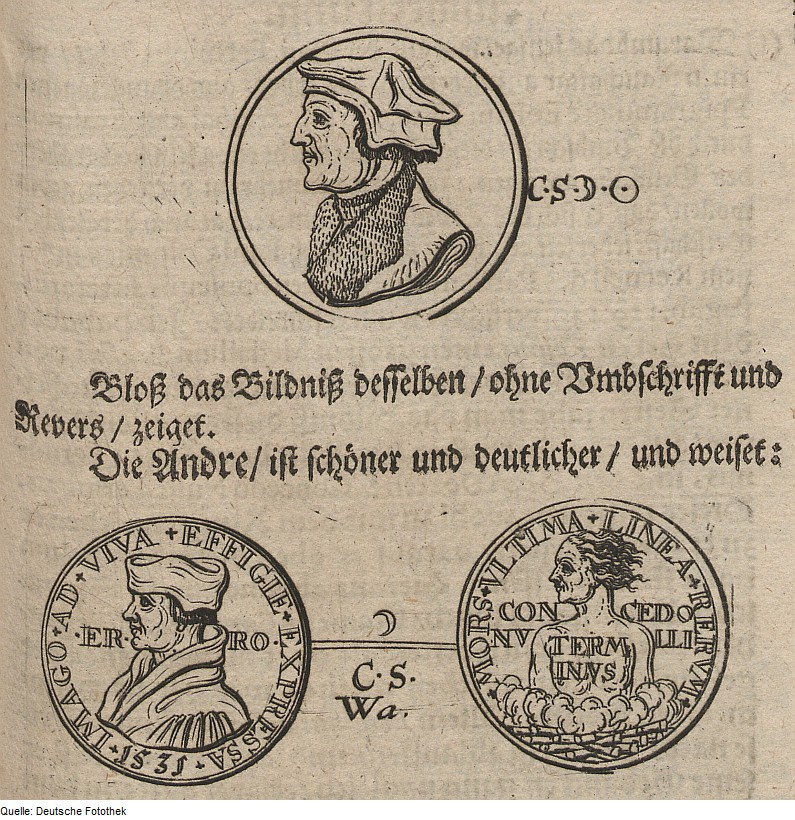
Commemorative coins or medals of Erasmus by Göbel, Georg Wilhelm (1790)

Erasmus frequently gifted portraits and medals with his image to friends and patrons.

- Hans Holbein painted him at least three times and perhaps as many as seven, some of the Holbein portraits of Erasmus surviving only in copies by other artists. Holbein's three profile portraits – two (nearly identical) profile portraits and one three-quarters-view portrait – were all painted in the same year, 1523. Erasmus used the Holbein portraits as gifts for his friends in England, such as William Warham, the Archbishop of Canterbury. (Writing in a letter to Warham regarding the gift portrait, Erasmus quipped that "he might have something of Erasmus should God call him from this place.") Erasmus spoke favourably of Holbein as an artist and person but was later critical, accusing him of sponging off various patrons whom Erasmus had recommended, for purposes more of monetary gain than artistic endeavour. There were scores of copies of these portraits made in Erasmus's time. Holbein's 1532 profile woodcut was particularly lauded by those who knew Erasmus.
- Albrecht Dürer also produced portraits of Erasmus, whom he met three times, in the form of an engraving of 1526 and a preliminary charcoal sketch. Concerning the former Erasmus was unimpressed, declaring it an unfavorable likeness of him, perhaps because around 1525 he was suffering severely from kidney stones. Nevertheless, Erasmus and Dürer maintained a close friendship, with Dürer going so far as to solicit Erasmus's support for the Lutheran cause, which Erasmus politely declined. Erasmus wrote a glowing encomium about the artist, likening him to famous Greek painter of antiquity Apelles. Erasmus was deeply affected by his death in 1528.
- Quentin Matsys produced the earliest known portraits of Erasmus, including an oil painting from life in 1517 (which had to be delayed as Erasmus's pain distorted his face) and a medal in 1519.
- In 1622, Hendrick de Keyser cast a statue of Erasmus in (gilt) bronze replacing an earlier stone version from 1557, itself replacing a wooden one of 1549, possibly a gift from the City of Basel. This was set up in the public square in Rotterdam, and today may be found outside the St. Lawrence Church. It is the oldest bronze statue in the Netherlands.
- In 1790, Georg Wilhelm Göbel struck commemorative medals.'
- Canterbury Cathedral, England has a statue of Erasmus on the North Face, placed in 1870.
- The Whitechapel Gallery in London has a weathervane depicting Erasmus riding back-to-front on a horse, by Rodney Graham in 2009.

Interest in developments of visual arts or artists is notably absent in Erasmus's writing, despite moving in circles where he shared friends and patron with famous artists: for example, in Venice Erasmus's friend Giulio Camillo worked with Titian. Erasmus was personal friends of Hans Holbein and Albrecht Dürer.

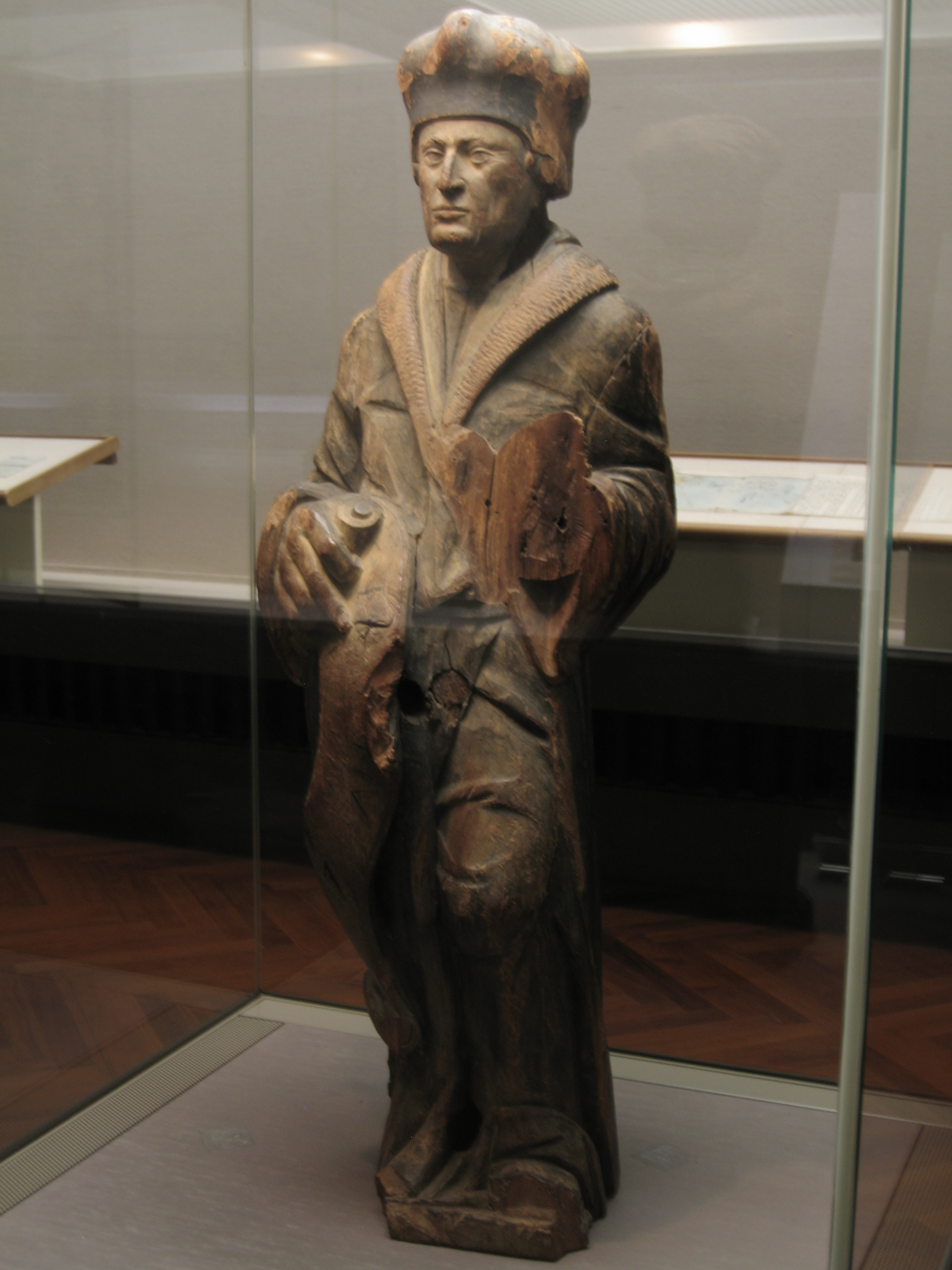
Wooden figure of Desiderius Erasmus which served as the stern ornament of the Dutch trading ship Liefde ("Love"), which arrived in Japan in 1600. Conversation with the surviving pilot William Adams convinced the Shogun to violently suppress Catholicism again.

=== In literature and media ===
- Renaissance composer Benedictus Appenzeller wrote a five-part motet Plangite Pierides (Lament on the Death of Erasmus) over a cantus firmus Cecidit corona capitis nostri (Lam. 5:16), score available Open Source. Appenzeller was part of the court of dowager Queen Mary of Hungary, whose invitation in 1535 of haven in Brabant Erasmus had contingently accepted the year before his death. It has been recorded several times: by Konrad Ruhland with Capella Antiqua München and by Jordi Savall with La Capella Reial De Catalunya
  - The Savall recording Erasmus – Praise of Folly is a program of 16th century music, notably la folia, and recitation of famous excerpts from Erasmus, Luther, etc. and released in multiple European languages.
- Erasmus is a character in the comic Act III, scene 1, of the Elizabethan play Sir Thomas More, though not in the passages attributed to Shakespeare. (Note: However, Shakespeare's soliloqy introduction to this scene against aggrandizement gives the comedy a serious intent.)
  - In the play, More is just about to be made Lord Chancellor; visiting famous poet Erasmus is meeting him for the first time; judge More plays a merry trick ("I'll see if great Erasmus can distinguish merit and outward ceremony") by disguising a rough servant as himself; he pretends to be the porter and speaks Latin to Erasmus outside; Erasmus launches into a Latin speech directed to the fake More, but repeatedly questions that this could, in fact, be More; More reveals himself; they bond over mirth and love of poetry:
    More: Thus you see,
    My loving learned friends, how far respect
    Waits often on the ceremonious train
    Of base illiterate wealth, whilst men of schools,
    Shrouded in poverty, are counted fools.
    Pardon, thou reverent German, I have mixed
    So slight a jest to the fair entertainment
    Of thy most worthy self;
    ...
    Erasmus: Study should be the saddest time of life.
    The rest a sport exempt from thought of strife.
- Actor Ken Bones portrays Erasmus in David Starkey's 2009 documentary series Henry VIII: The Mind of a Tyrant

== Works ==
Erasmus was the most popular, most printed and arguably most influential author of the early sixteenth century, read in all nations in the West and frequently translated. By the 1530s, his writings accounted for 10–20% of book sales in Europe. "Undoubtedly he was the most read author of his age." His vast number of Latin and Greek publications included translations, paraphrases, letters, textbooks, plays for schoolboys, commentary, poems, liturgies, satires, sermons, and prayers. A large number of his later works were defences of his earlier work from attacks by Catholic and Protestant theological and literary opponents.

The Catalogue of the Works of Erasmus (2023) runs to 444 entries (120 pages), almost all from the latter half of his life. He usually wrote books in particular classical literary genres with their different rhetorical conventions: complaint, diatribe, dialogue, encomium, epistle, commentary, liturgy, sermon, etc. His letter to Ulrich von Hutten on Thomas More's household has been called "the first real biography in the real modern sense."

From his youth, Erasmus had been a voracious writer. Erasmus wrote or answered up to 40 letters per day, usually waking early in the morning and writing them in his own hand. He did not work after dinner. His writing method (recommended in De copia and De ratione studii) was to make notes on whatever he was reading, categorised by theme: he carted these commonplaces in boxes that accompanied him. When assembling a new book, he would go through the topics and cross out commonplace notes as he used them. This catalogue of research notes allowed him to rapidly create books, though woven from the same topics. Towards the end of his life, as he lost dexterity, he employed secretaries or amanuenses who performed the assembly or transcription, re-wrote his writing, and in his last decade, recorded his dictation; letters were usually in his own hand, unless formal. For much of his career he wrote standing at a desk, as shown in Dürer's portrait.

=== New Testament editions ===
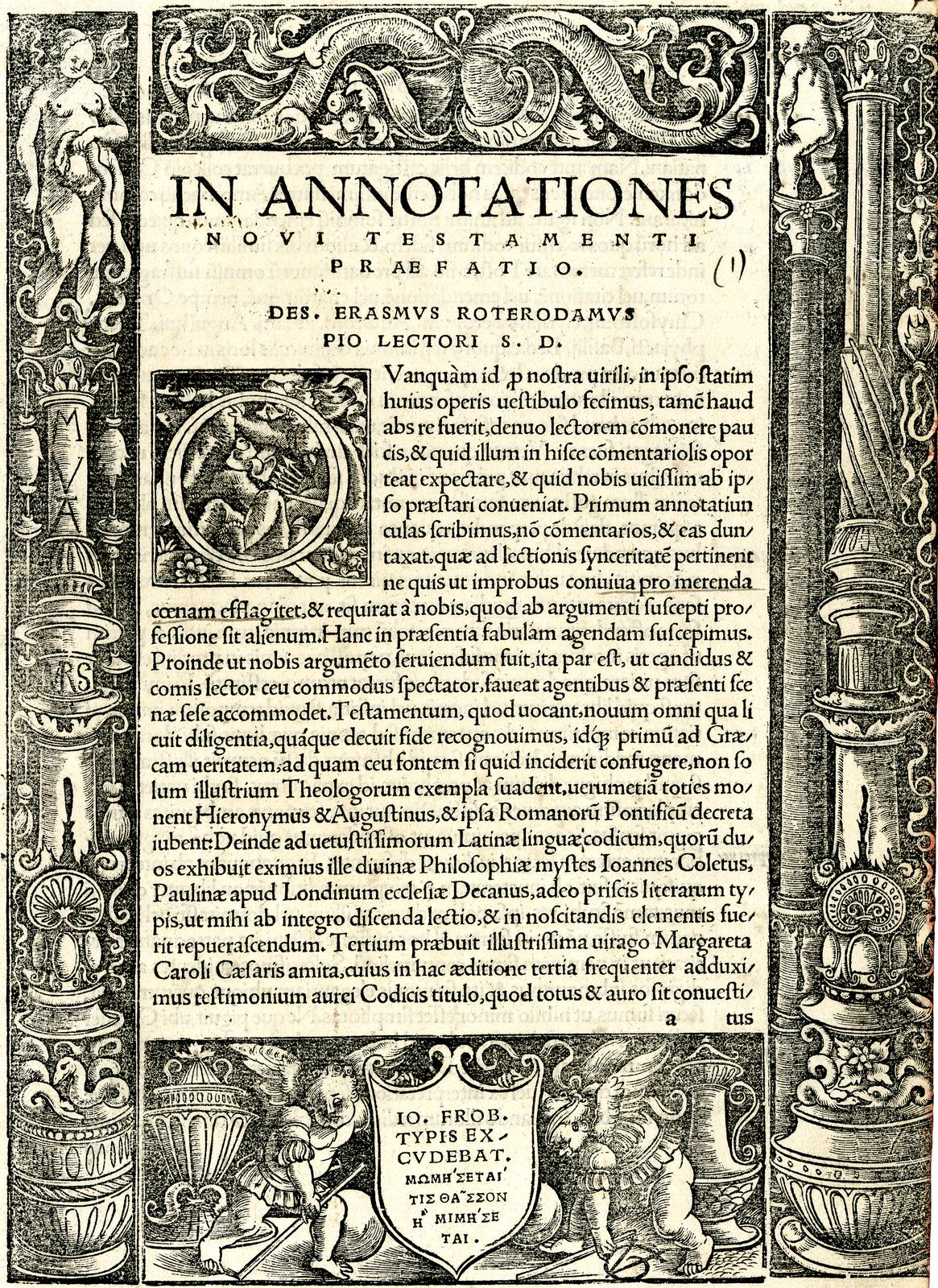
First page of Preface, Annotations of the New Testament (1521), with characteristic Froben decoration

In the second half of his life, Erasmus worked on New Testament studies in a project that eventually saw his intended detailed Annotations on the New Testament (modeled on a work by Lorenzo Valla) expand with a revised Vulgate recension, his own new Latin translation, an accompanying Greek text, essays justifying his approach, and lengthy Paraphrases of the entire New Testament except Revelation.

These went through multiple revisions and editions, and progressively involved many leading scholars and introduced several readings which were taken up by Protestant and Catholic reformers. Other publishers, such as Erasmus's earlier collaborator Aldine Press in Venice, immediately brought out their own editions, sometimes with their own corrections, and sometimes without the Annotations, or the Latin, or the Greek. Up to 300,000 copies of the various editions appear to have been printed in Erasmus's lifetime.

This body of work formed the basis for the majority of Textus Receptus Protestant translations of the New Testament in the 16th–19th centuries, including those of Martin Luther, William Tyndale and the King James Version.

Erasmus denied he was making a critical edition: "I certainly did not undertake this task [of revising the New Testament] to provide a standard from which it would not be possible to diverge, but to make a substantial contribution both to the correction and to the understanding of the sacred books." He also later wrote to several Protestant and Catholic friends and critics, notably to his friend Pope Adrian, that "(to be quite frank) had I known that a generation such as this would appear, I should either not have written at all some things that I have written or should have written them differently."

=== Notable writings ===
Erasmus mainly wrote for educated audiences. According to biographer Erika Rummel "Three areas preoccupied Erasmus as a writer: language arts, education, and biblical studies. [...]All of his works served as models of style. [...]He pioneered the principles of textual criticism."

As well as books of humanist interests, he wrote extensively on pastoral subjects: "to Christians in the various stages of lives:[...]for the young, for married couples, for widows," the dying, clergy, theologians, religious, princes, partakers of sacraments, etc.

He is noted for his extensive scholarly editions of the New Testament in Latin and Greek, and the complete works of numerous Church Fathers through the Basel publisher/printer Froben. His editions of Greek and Roman moralists and rhetoricians such as Plutarch, Ovid, Ptolemy, Lucian, Seneca and Cicero re-introduced their broader thought to the West. Notable among other books he edited or published himself were Lorenzo Valla's Adnotationes in Novum Testamentum and Thomas More's Epigrammata and Utopia, which he contributed a poem to. He wrote many books defending his ideas from the opposition of some Catholic theologians on one hand, and various Protestants on the other: he notably broke with Martin Luther when Luther developed his ideas beyond what Erasmus thought was safe and justifiable.

The only works with enduring popularity in modern time are his satires and semi-satires: The Praise of Folly, Julius Excluded from Heaven and The Complaint of Peace. However, his other works, such as his several thousand letters, continue to be a vital source of information to historians of numerous disciplines.
