= Paraphrase of Erasmus =

1548 book by Nicholas Udall

The first tome or volume of the Paraphrase of Erasmus upon the new testament
- Author: Nicholas Udall
- Language: English
- Publisher: Edward Whitchurch, Richard Grafton
- Publication date: 1548
- Publication place: England
- Media type: Print

The First tome or volume of the Paraphrase of Erasmus upon the new testament or the Paraphrase of Erasmus is the first volume of a book combining an English translation of the New Testament interleaved with an English translation of Desiderius Erasmus's Latin paraphrase of the New Testament. It was edited by Nicholas Udall and first published in January 1548 by Edward Whitchurch. The second volume was published in 1549. Translations were by Nicolas Udall, Catherine Parr, Miles Coverdale, Leonard Coxe, Queen Mary I, and others.

According to a royal Injunction of 1547, copies were to be kept in every parish church in England, emphasizing the influence of Erasmus on the English Reformation.

== Background ==
The Paraphrases of Erasmus, which were composed and published between 1517 and 1523, exerted great influence on English Christianity of the time. It was probably the idea of Catherine Parr, the last wife of King Henry VIII, to translate these paraphrases into English "to guide English Scripture readers into less contentious paths." She assembled a group of translators, and submitted their work and her patronage to Nicholas Udall, who oversaw the editing process and was probably responsible for the translation of the Gospel of Luke. The queen herself may have translated parts of the Gospel of Matthew and Acts of the Apostles, and Mary I, a princess at that time, translated the Gospel of John.

In his 1547 Injunctions, Edward VI ordered that a copy of this work should be placed in every church within a year of its completion in 1547. This raised the commentary by Erasmus on the New Testament to the status of being the authorized commentary by the Church of England under Edward VI; the book was "forced upon all parish churches in an effort to infuse the English Reformation with even more Erasmian thought."

== Printing history ==
Edward Whitchurch and Richard Grafton, also the printers of the Great Bible, were given the job of printing the translated Paraphrases. The first printing appeared on the last day of January 1548. While the imprint lists only Whitchurch, Grafton must have been involved as well, as suggested by the typography. Incidentally, Whitchurch and Grafton also published the Injunctions, though earlier they had fallen from royal grace: they had been friends of Thomas Cromwell, 1st Earl of Essex and their fortunes declined with Cromwell's downfall.

According to Herbert, William Aldis Wright has noted no less than six variants of the first edition because multiple presses were run to generate enough copies within the short period of a year.

== Contents ==
The book was dedicated to Catherine Parr. Volume 1 includes the Gospels through Acts; Volume 2 contains the balance of the New Testament with the exception of The Paraphrase on Revelation (omitted by Erasmus), which is by Leo Jud.

Herbert gives a table of contents for the copy that he has examined (most Bibles from this period include neither an index or a table of contents). Placement of the contents may vary among copies because different variants of the Bible were produced at the same time. William Aldis Wright found at least 6 variants of this volume were produced by different presses to satisfy the demand. Because they were set by different typesetters, there is no uniform placement of the contents for this Bible first volume of this Bible.

== Catalog entries ==
In A. S. Herbert's historical catalogue of English Bibles (1968) it is identified as "Herbert 72", printed in 2 volumes; according to Herbert, volumes are kept at Bible House England, British Museum, Bodleian Library Oxford, University Library Cambridge, Harvard Library, and New York Public Library.

A second edition appears as "Herbert 73", printed in 1551–52, but only Volume 1 appears to be known. Herbert reports that the existent copies have many mutilated pages, and their scarcity is due to the efforts of Mary I to restore the (Latin) Vulgate Bible, after she became queen in 1553. In her effort to promote Roman Catholicism she ordered all copies of this book to be destroyed—despite having translated Erasmus' commentary on St. John, for which she is praised in this very book. Volume 2 may never have been printed, given that the timing of its printing would have been at the approximate time of her ascension to the throne. If it does exist, the location of any copies is not documented.
