= Cranmer Hall =

Cranmer Hall may refer to:

- Cranmer Hall, Durham
- Cranmer Hall, Lincolnshire
- Cranmer Hall, Norfolk on List of country houses in the United Kingdom
