= James Peele =

English writer on bookkeeping

James Peele (died 1585) was an English schoolmaster, accountant, and clerk of Christ’s Hospital in London. He was one of the earliest English writers on double-entry bookkeeping and played a key role in introducing Italian accounting methods to an English-speaking audience. Peele authored two important treatises on commercial arithmetic and accounting, helping to lay the groundwork for formal business education in England.

== Life and career ==
Peele's early life remains obscure, but he is known to have been active in London in the mid-16th century. From 1562 he served as clerk to Christ’s Hospital, a charitable institution founded in 1552 under the patronage of King Edward VI. In this role, Peele was responsible for managing the hospital’s financial records and accounts.

Peele also worked as a teacher of writing, reading, and bookkeeping. His written works reflect the didactic inclinations of their author, in that they seek to make complex accounting principles accessible to merchants and tradespeople, and to facilitate their practical application.

== Works ==
Peele wrote two notable works on accounting. The first, titled The Maner and Fourme How to Kepe a Perfecte Reconyng, was published in London in 1553 by the King’s Printer, Richard Grafton. It is the earliest extant original work on bookkeeping in English (there are no known surviving copies of an earlier English work on the subject, Hugh Oldcastle’s A Profitable Treatyce). The book provides instruction in the maintenance of accurate financial records using systematic methods, and is considered an important and influential precursor to later, more detailed works on the subject.

Only one complete copy of The Maner and Fourme is known to survive, held in the Library of the Institute of Chartered Accountants in England and Wales; a digitised copy is available online.

In 1569 Peele's second treatise on accounting, titled The Pathe Waye to Perfectnes, in th'Accomptes of Debitour, and Creditour, was published in London. Taking the form of two Socratic dialogues, it presents the Italian method of double-entry bookkeeping in a form tailored to English merchants and scholars, using practical examples. The book describes procedures for keeping journals, ledgers, and other commercial records in considerably more detail than Peele’s first treatise.

== Legacy ==
Peele’s writings mark a significant milestone in the history of accounting in England. By presenting accounting methods in English and demonstrating their application to the practical needs of native merchants, they contributed to the diffusion of the double-entry bookkeeping system — originally developed in Renaissance Italy — into English commercial practice.

In addition, his works (particularly The Pathe Waye) are acknowledged to contain original contributions which improved upon some of the models and procedures previously put forward by writers on the Continent. For instance, Peele has been praised for setting forth novel procedures for closing a ledger.
