= Richard Turner (reformer) =

English Protestant reformer and Marian exile

Richard Turner (died 1565?) was an English Protestant reformer and Marian exile during the reign of Mary I.

== Life ==
Born in Staffordshire, he was educated at Magdalen College, Oxford, of which he became a Fellow. He graduated B.A. on 19 July 1524, M.A. on 12 July 1529, and B.D. on 27 January 1536, and supplicated for D.D. in 1552. On 25 January 1536 he was elected to a perpetual chantry in the king's college at Windsor. He was appointed by Ralph Morice, Thomas Cranmer's secretary, to be rector of Chartham, Kent, where he neglected Catholic rites.

He was a staunch supporter of royal supremacy, and was able to avoid the dangers besetting an ecclesiastic under Henry VIII. In 1543 a bill of accusation was presented against him and others of Cranmer's chaplains and preachers at the sessions for not complying with the statute of the Six Articles; this attack was aimed at Cranmer himself, who however possessed the favour of the king, and the indictments in consequence came to nothing. Turner was at that time living in the family of Ralph Morice. On 1 July 1545 Turner was instituted to the vicarage of St. Stephen's-by-Saltash in Cornwall; he has been doubtfully identified with the Richard Turner who was appointed rector of Chipping Ongar in Essex in 1544, and vicar of Hillingdon in Middlesex in 1545. In July 1549, during popular unrest in Kent against the reformers, Turner went to the rioters' camp and preached against them, narrowly escaping being hanged.

Turner suggested to John Marbeck, organist at Windsor, the compilation of his concordance of the English Bible which appeared in July 1550. He had been appointed one of the Six Preachers in Canterbury Cathedral in 1550. On 24 December 1551 he was appointed to a prebend at Windsor, and he also about this time obtained the vicarage of Dartford in Kent.

In the following year he was recommended by Cranmer for the archbishopric of Armagh, but declined, chiefly on the grounds of his ignorance of the Irish language.

On the accession of Mary I of England he went into exile. In 1555, while at Frankfurt, he joined with other English refugees in publicly repudiating John Knox's principles on civil government. They took exception to several passages in Knox's Faythfull Admonition unto the professours of Gods Truthe in England, assailing Queen Mary, Philip, and the Emperor Charles V. They drew the attention of the town authorities to Knox's views, and he was in consequence expelled. In Basel he delivered lectures on the epistles to the Hebrews and to the Ephesians, and on the general epistle of St. James, which were 'fit for the press,' according to Anthony Wood, in 1558, but were not published.

Turner returned to England on the accession of Elizabeth I, and in 1559 was restored to the vicarage of Dartford. In the following year he was selected by Matthew Parker as a visitor to reform abuses in the two Kentish dioceses. He probably died in 1565, when he was succeeded as vicar by John Appelbie.
