= Ralph Morice =

Ralph Morice was the secretary and biographer of Thomas Cranmer, Archbishop of Canterbury.

== Life ==
Born about 1500, he is presumed to be the younger son of James Morice, clerk of the kitchen and master of the works to Margaret, Countess of Richmond. His father, who was living in 1537, amassed a fortune and lived at Chipping Ongar, Essex. His principal duty consisted in supervising the buildings of the countess at Cambridge. The eldest son, William Morice (fl. 1547), was gentleman-usher, first to Richard Pace, and afterwards to Henry VIII, and towards the end of Henry's reign was in gaol and in peril of his life on a charge of heresy. William was father of the ecclesiastical lawyer James Morice.

Ralph Morice was educated at Cambridge; he graduated B.A. in 1523, and commenced M.A. in 1526. He became secretary to Cranmer in 1528 before his elevation to the archbishopric, and continued in the office until after Edward VI's death. In 1532 he went with Hugh Latimer, his brother, and others to see James Bainham in Newgate Prison before his execution. On 18 June 1537 he and his father received a grant of the office of bailiff for some crown lands, and in 1547 he was made registrar to the commissioners appointed to visit the dioceses of Rochester, Canterbury, Chichester, and Winchester.

His duties while secretary to the archbishop were heavy. In a memorial, printed in the Appendix to John Strype's Cranmer and addressed to Queen Elizabeth, he speaks of writing much in defence of the ecclesiastical changes; much of his work must have been anonymous. He had the farm of the parsonage of Chartham in Kent—that is to say he put in a curate, keeping the rest of the revenues. The curate, Richard Turner, got into trouble for Protestant preaching in 1544, but Morice managed to clear him. The Turner case was part of the serious plot against Cranmer at this time; Morice worked with Anthony Denny and William Butts at court, and played a significant part in the successful counter-attack that secured Cranmer's position with the king.

Under Queen Mary, Morice was in some danger. His house was twice searched, and he lost many of his papers and had to flee. He was imprisoned, but escaped. The end of his life he passed at Bekesbourne in Kent. There he fell into poverty, and stated in one of his petitions to Queen Elizabeth that he had four daughters whom he lacked the means to marry. Three of these, however, Margaret, Mary, and Anne, were married in January and February 1571. Alyce Morice, who was buried 25 February 1562, may have been his wife. He was buried at Christ Church Newgate, London 22 March 1573.

== Works ==
Morice, from his official position, was in possession of information, and helped John Foxe and others in their literary researches, mainly by supplying them with his Anecdotes of Cranmer. This compilation was used by Strype in his Memorials of Cranmer, and was reprinted from the manuscript at Corpus Christi College, Cambridge, in Narratives of the Reformation (Camden Society). Morice gave other assistance to Foxe, and wrote an account of Latimer's conversion, which is printed in Strype's Memorials and in Latimer's Works. Harleian MS. 6148 consists of copies of letters written by Morice on the archbishop's business. Transcripts by Strype of some of these form Lansdowne MS. 1045. They were published by Henry Jenkyns and John Edmund Cox in their editions of Cranmer's ‘Works.’
