= Knuckle mnemonic =

Mnemonic for the number of days in each month

The two-handed knuckle mnemonic

The knuckle mnemonic is a mnemonic device for remembering the number of days in the months of the Julian and Gregorian calendars.

== Methods ==
=== One-handed ===
One form of the mnemonic is done by counting on the knuckles of one's hand to remember the number of days in each month. Knuckles are counted as 31 days, depressions between knuckles as fewer, be that 30 or the 28/29 days of February. One starts with the little finger knuckle as January, and one finger or depression at a time is counted towards the index finger knuckle (July), saying the months while doing so. One then returns to the little finger knuckle (now August) and continues for the remaining months.

One variant of this approach differs after reaching the index finger knuckle (July): instead of wrapping around back to the little finger, some people reverse direction and continue from the index finger knuckle (counting it for both July and August) and ending on the ring finger knuckle.

=== Two-handed ===
Others use two hands: starting with the little finger knuckle of the left hand, proceeding to the left index finger knuckle, then (swapping hands) jump to the right fist's index finger knuckle for August, finishing on the knuckle of the right ring finger.

== See also ==
- Finger counting
- "Thirty Days Hath September..."
