= Andreas Osiander =

German Lutheran theologian and Protestant reformer

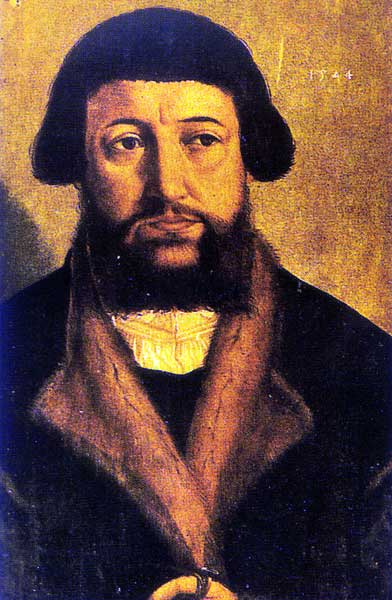
- Born: 19 December 1498; Gunzenhausen, Principality of Ansbach
- Died: 17 October 1552 (aged 53); Königsberg, Duchy of Prussia
- Education: University of Ingolstadt (no degree)
- Church: Lutheran
- Ordained: 1520

Andreas Osiander (German: [ˈoːziˌandɐ]; 19 December 1498 – 17 October 1552) was a German Lutheran theologian and Protestant reformer.

== Career ==
Born at Gunzenhausen, Ansbach, in the region of Franconia, Osiander studied at the University of Ingolstadt before being ordained as a Catholic priest in 1520 in Nuremberg. In the same year he began work at an Augustinian convent in Nuremberg as a Hebrew tutor. In 1522, he was appointed to the church of St. Lorenz in Nuremberg, and at the same time publicly declared himself to be a Lutheran. During the First Diet of Nuremberg (1522), he met Albert of Prussia, Grand Master of the Teutonic Knights, and played an important role in converting him to Lutheranism. He also played a prominent role in the debate which led to the city of Nuremberg's adoption of the Reformation in 1525, and in the same year Osiander married.

Osiander attended the Marburg Colloquy (1529), the Diet of Augsburg (1530) and the signing of the Schmalkalden articles (1531). The Augsburg Interim of 1548 made it necessary for him to leave Nuremberg, settling first at Breslau (Wrocław), then, in 1549, at Königsberg (Kaliningrad) as professor of the newly founded Königsberg University, appointed by Albert of Prussia. Osiander lived and worked in Königsberg until his death in 1552.

== Works ==
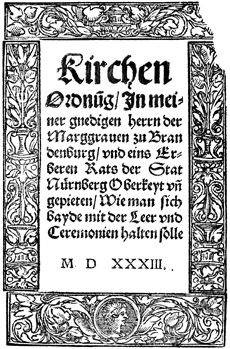
Title Page of Brandenburg-Nuernbergishe Kirchenordnung, 1533.

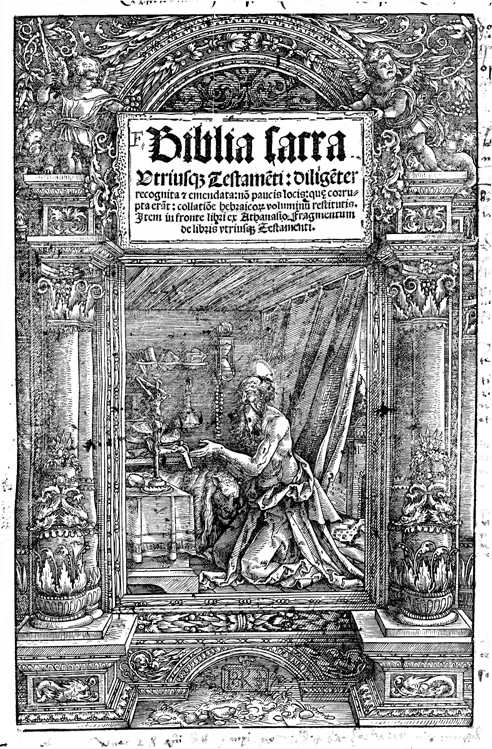
Title Page of an edition of the Vulgate from 1523.

Osiander published a corrected edition of the Vulgate Bible, with notes, in 1522. In 1533, Brandenburg-Nuernbergische Kirchenordnung vom Jahre 1533 was published, with Osiander assisting in both the source material and the final editing. This combined order of worship and catechism was the first work to include the Keys section of Luther's Small Catechism, of which Osiander is a suspected author. He wrote a gospel harmony published in Basel in 1537, the Harmoniae Evangelicae, which had his Greek harmony on one page and a Latin translation on the facing page. He also included annotations that explained how he had arrived at the order and how he had merged parallel accounts. Osiander's gospel harmony was popular and influential. One quirk of Osiander's approach was that due to his opinions on the inspiration of the Scriptures - that they were practically a transcript of precise wordings - his approach to handling nearly any difference between gospel accounts was to assert that similar events had happened multiple times. For example, his annotations argue there were four separate but similar healings of blind men at Jericho; Peter warmed himself at a fire four separate times; Jairus' daughter was raised from the dead on two separate occasions; Jesus was crowned with thorns two times at his trial; and so on. Luther and Calvin seem to have disagreed with Osiander's approach, with Luther seemingly making a veiled jab at Osiander's harmony in one of his writings, although not naming him directly.

In 1543, Osiander oversaw the publication of the book De revolutionibus orbium coelestium (On the revolutions of the celestial spheres) by Copernicus. He added a preface suggesting that the model described in the book was not necessarily true, or even probable, but was useful for computational purposes. This was certainly not the opinion of Copernicus, who was probably unaware of the addition. As a result, many readers, unaware that Osiander was the author of the preface, believed that Copernicus himself had not believed that his hypothesis was actually true. Osiander also did not sign the preface added to Copernicus' book, therefore many readers at the time assumed that this is what Copernicus had actually thought himself.

In 1550 Osiander published two controversial disputations, De Lege et Evangelio and De Justificatione. In these, he set out his view that justification by faith was instilled in (rather than ascribed to) humanity by Christ's divinity, a view contrary to those of Martin Luther and John Calvin although he agreed with Lutheranism's fundamental opposition to Roman Catholicism. These beliefs were maintained after his death by Johann Funck (his son-in-law) but disappeared after 1566. Osiander's view has been described as similar to Eastern Orthodox teachings on theosis.

Some historians, such as Tuomo Mannermaa, have argued that Luther's own views of justification, especially early in his life, were actually closer to the views of Osiander than to those of Flacius or what would later become confessional Lutheranism.

== Theology ==
Osiander was a Christian mystic and his theology incorporated the idea of mystical union with Christ and the Word of God. He believed that justification for a Christian believer resulted from Christ dwelling in a person. Contrary to Luther's belief that justification was imputed by God's grace, Osiander believed that the righteousness of a believer was accomplished by the indwelling of God; thus, God finds one righteous because Christ is in that person. Calvin rejected these views of Osiander, as did Melanchthon and Flacius. Flacius' opposing view was that God justifies us by Christ's work of obedience on the cross, not by his presence in us.

== Translated works ==
- "Andreas Osiander's Disputatio de iustificatione: An English Translation." In Challenging the Traditional Interpretations of Justification by Faith, Part 2, 315–322. Anaheim, CA: Living Stream, 2023.

== Family ==
He was the father of theologian Lucas Osiander the Elder. His grandsons Andreas (1562–1617) and Lukas (1571–1638) also worked as theologians. His niece Margarete married the future Archbishop of Canterbury, Thomas Cranmer.
