= Paraphrases of Erasmus =

Biblical paraphrases from the early 1500s

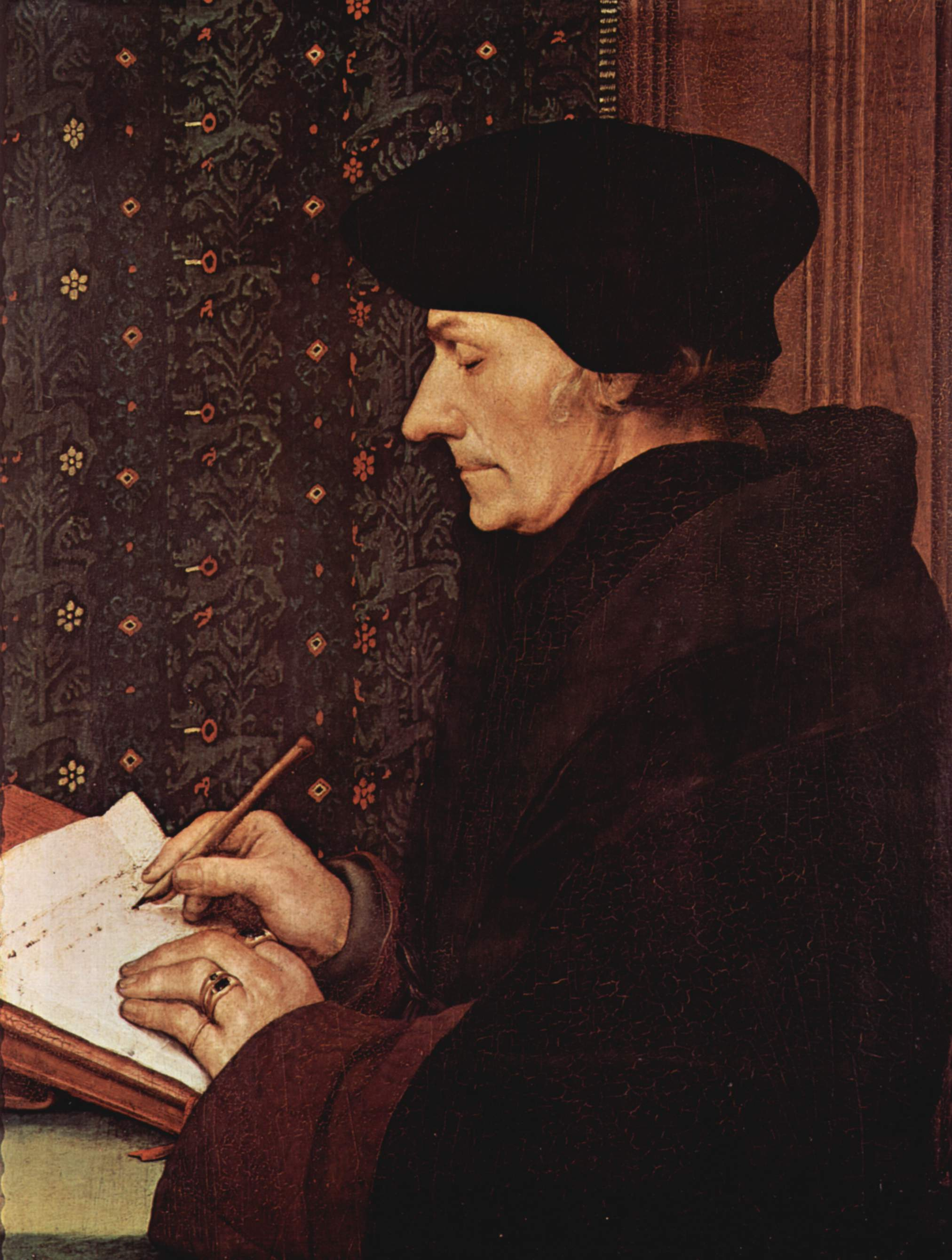
Portrait of Erasmus von Rotterdam by Hans Holbein the Younger (first quarter of 16th century, Louvre, Paris)

The Paraphrases were Latin Biblical paraphrases, rewritings of the Gospels by Desiderius Erasmus. Composed between 1517 and 1524, Erasmus occasionally revised them until his death in 1536.

In 1547, King Edward VI of England ordered an English-language version to be displayed in all parish churches. The translation was overseen by Nicholas Udall, with the future Queen Mary I, Edward's half-sister, contributing.

== Composition and publication history ==
Erasmus began publishing the Latin-language Paraphrases with the Pauline Epistles. The paraphrase of Romans was published in quarto by Flemish printer Dirk Martens in Leuven in November 1517 and reprinted by Erasmus's friend Johann Froben in January of the following year. It sold well and was soon reprinted in octavo.

Corinthians (both epistles) was published by Martens in February 1519 and reprinted in Basel by Froben in March. Galatians appeared later that year, with editions from both publishers. The remaining Epistles followed in 1520 and 1521, the last to appear being Hebrews.

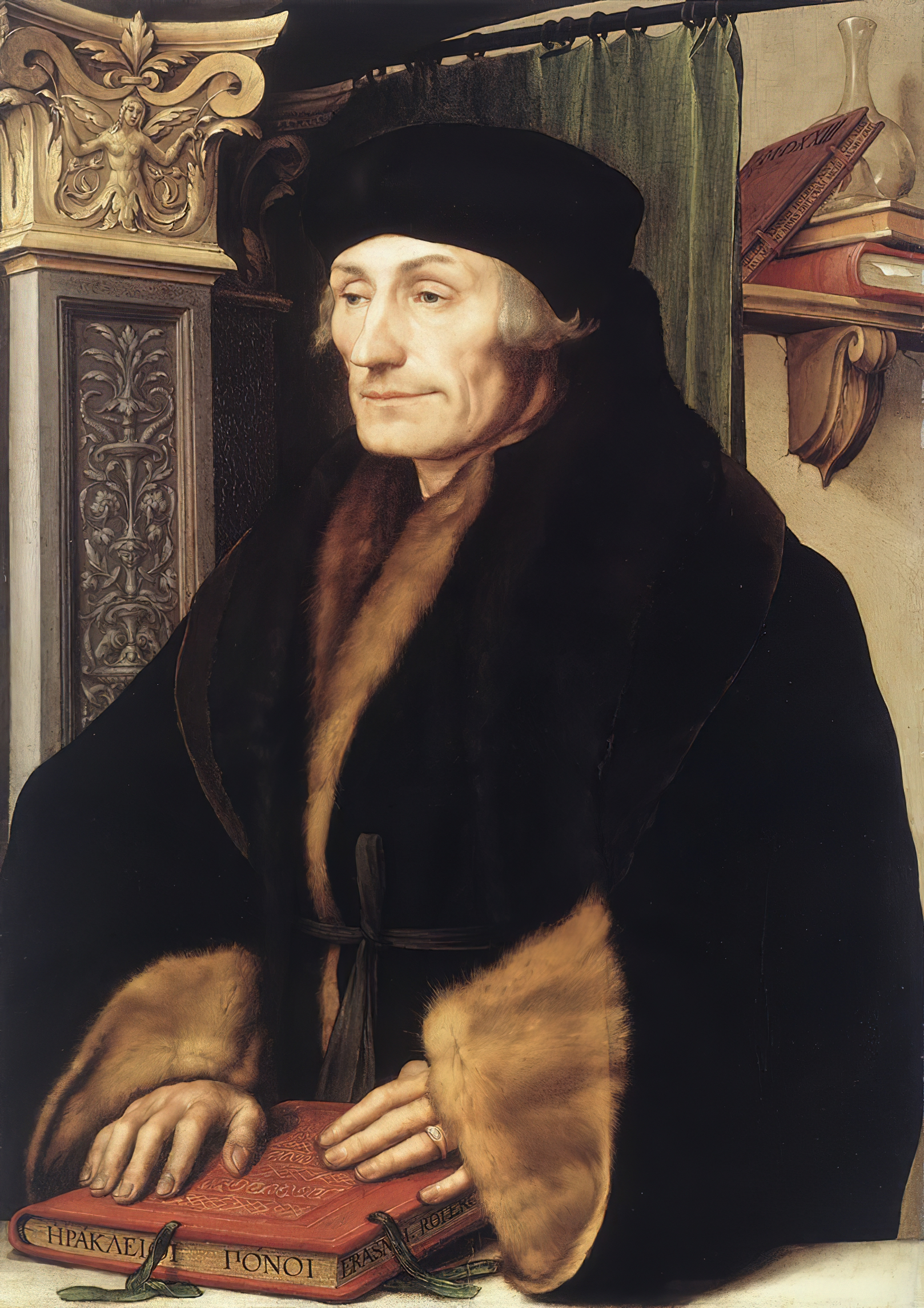
Portrait of Desiderius Erasmus of Rotterdam with Renaissance Pilaster by Hans Holbein the Younger (1523, National Gallery, London)

In the autumn of 1521, Erasmus moved from Louvain to Basel, and from that time Froben published the first editions of the remaining Paraphrases. Erasmus turned to the Gospels: Matthew appearing in March 1522 (in both folio and octavo - from now on there are no more quartos), John in February (folio) and March (octavo) 1523, Luke in August 1523, and Mark in early 1524 (with a title page dated 1523). Acts followed quickly, the dedication copy being dated February 13, 1524.

Froben published a complete edition in two volumes: the first, "a stout octavo volume of 400 leaves dated 1523 and called Tomus secundus", contained the Epistles, and the Tomus primus containing the Gospels and Acts appeared the following year. "This was a considerable investment, and the firm kept it in their list for ten years", resetting portions as needed without a change of date.

The Paraphrases were reissued in various formats and combinations during the following decades; Roger Mynors writes: "When one is faced with one of these editions in folio, one has to remember that a purchaser would see them as composed of separable parts, out of which sets could be made up in any way that supply might dictate."

== History of the English translation ==
Edward VI ordered the Paraphrases to be put up "in some convenient place" for reading in all parish churches. The command was in Edward's Injunctions of 1547.

A translation into English, overseen by Nicholas Udall, was made nearly immediately, with the future Queen Mary I, Edward's half-sister, performing the translation of the Gospel of John. Since Edward was only ten years old at the time (although already Protestant), it is likely that the elevation of Erasmus's text came about through the influence of one of his guardians or Thomas Cranmer.
