= Margarete Cranmer =

German woman (died c. 1571)

Margarete Cranmer (d. c. 1571) was the second wife of the reformation Archbishop of Canterbury, Thomas Cranmer. She was the niece of Katharina Preu, wife of Andreas Osiander, the principal reformer of Nuremberg and pastor of St. Lorenz, Nuremberg. Cranmer met her future husband during his six-month stay in Nuremberg in spring 1532 during his duties as an Ambassador of King Henry VIII to Emperor Charles V.

== Marriage to Cranmer ==
Little is known about Cranmer's parents: "we know that Katharina Preu was the daughter of the brewer Heinrich Preu and Margarete his wife, née Hetzel, but we cannot be sure whether [Thomas] Cranmer’s wife was the daughter of a sister or brother of Katharina, so the younger Margaret’s maiden name remains uncertain". In July 1532, Osiander officiated at the wedding of his wife’s niece to Cranmer, citing Processus contra Thomam Cranmer, in. In October 1532, Thomas Cranmer was recalled to London in order to succeed William Warham as Archbishop of Canterbury; he was consecrated on 30 March 1533. "[A] complete silence envelops Cranmer's wife during the 1530s; she probably came to England quite soon after he became Archbishop, but she kept so low a profile as to be invisible. … It is likely that Margaret remained most of the time down at Ford, the remotest of Cranmer's palaces.”

The Cranmers' first child, Margaret, was born possibly in Germany as early as 1532–33, and certainly before 1539. Cranmer sent his wife and children abroad in the summer of 1539..The couple's enforced eight-year separation ended with the accession of Edward VI in 1547 and Cranmer returned to England. By the 1550s, their son Thomas had been born and the Cranmers' marriage was widely acknowledged: the Zurich reformer Johann Stumpf (John Stumphius) informed Heinrich Bullinger on 1 June 1550 that Thomas Cranmer had 'lately taken a wife'. The editor interprets this as meaning that "In the time of King Edward, when the marriage of the clergy was allowed, he brought her forth, and lived openly with her." Two months after the accession of Mary Tudor in 1553, Thomas Cranmer was charged with treason and sent first to the Tower and then to Oxford's Bocardo Prison. "Mrs Cranmer had presumably been living at Lambeth or Croydon after her husband's arrest, as she had a perfect right to do in the state of English law then current; in the accounts, she was given some of the Archbishop's curtains, linen, a table and some bedding, together with other domestic odds and ends: certainly a comprehensive enough selection to keep her in modest comfort." Cranmer most likely once more sought exile in her native Germany, though it is possible that she and her two children remained in hiding in England until her husband’s execution in March 1556. The questions put to him at his trial about his marriages, and his answers to them, are contained in

== Story of the chest/trunk ==
Unlike Lutheran Nuremberg, England was Roman Catholic and therefore clerical celibacy was enforced. Sources differ as to whether Cranmer was able to live openly with her husband. Later recusant accounts suggest that Cranmer joined her husband clandestinely, having to hide in a ventilated chest during his travels through his province. (which contains a denial of the suggestion). Others suggest that, until June 1539 and the prorogation of the Six Articles (1539) with its strict re-enforcement of clerical celibacy, Cranmer lived 'more or less openly as his wife until the reign of Queen Mary, except whilst the Act of the Six Articles was in force, when she retired with her children into Germany'.

The story of the chest or trunk was related in the following sources, which are discussed in Ridley, Jasper (1962). Thomas Cranmer. Pan Macmillan. ISBN 9781447241287.: -

- Milnes, Richard Monckton, ed. (1885). Bishop Cranmer's Recantacyons;. London?: Privately printed. p. xii. (refers to page 8 - in Latin) (written about 1556)
- Harpsfield, Nicholas (1878). Pocock, Nicholas (ed.). A Treatise on the Pretended Divorce Between Henry VIII. and Catharine of Aragon. Camden Society. p. 275. (written late 1550's). Ridley states that "Harpsfield's story of the chest must be taken more seriously [than Parsons']" but that "the most likely explanation is that ... the chest contained depositions in judicial cases, rare books and manuscripts of Cranmer's writings which he was particularly eager to save from the fire." MacCulloch agrees, and calls the story of the chest a canard.
- Sanders, Nicholas (1877). Lewis, David (ed.). Rise and Growth of the Anglican Schism. London: Burns and Oates. p. 181. (written 1576) Ridley states that "Sanders confined himself to a general reference to the chest"
- Persons, Robert (1603). A treatise of three conversions of England. p. 371. Ridley states that the material in Nugae Antiquae "throws grave doubts on the truth of Parsons' story."

== Later life ==
After her husband's death, Cranmer married his friend and ally, Edward Whitchurch. Whitchurch had collaborated closely with Thomas Cranmer on the publication of the Great Bible in 1539. By the time of his marriage to Margarete Cranmer, he had been appointed ‘her Maiesties Printer for the Hebrew, Greke, & Latine tongs’. It was while she was married to Whitchurch that her daughter, Margaret, met and married the evangelical theologian, lawyer, author and translator Thomas Norton, who in 1561 lived with Edward Whitchurch and Margarete Cranmer. During his time in the Whitchurch household, Norton translated Calvin’s Institutes: ‘I performed my worke in the house of my sayd friende Edward Whitchurch, a man well known of vpright hart and dealing, an auncient zelous Gospeller, as plaine and true a friend as euer I knew living, and as desirous to do any thinge to common good, specially by the advancement of true religion’. Edward Whitchurch died in late November 1561, making provision in his will, dated 25 November 1561, for his widow, his children Edward, Helen and Elizbathe, and his stepson Thomas Cranmer and stepdaughter Margaret Cranmer.

She was not without means, and derived regular income from her interest in Kirkstall Abbey, Yorkshire, a personal grant of land made to her first husband Thomas Cranmer under the terms of the dissolution of monastic houses and conveyed to her.

Cranmer married for a third time in 1564. Her marriage to Bartholomew Scott of Camberwell, friend of her son-in-law Thomas Norton and Justice of the Peace for Surrey, was not a happy one: 'Scott had won Margaret, it was alleged, by flattery and expressions of deepest sympathy, but after marriage he dissembled no more. The marriage was without love, comfort, or mutuality'. Cranmer fled to her estate in Kirkstall and separated from her husband. She most likely died in 1571. Following his death in 1600 she was memorialised by Scott on his epitaph in St Giles' Church, Camberwell as 'Margaret, ye wido of ye right reverend Prel. and Martyr Tho. Cranmer, Archbish. of Canterburie'. A fire destroyed the church and the memorial, on 7 February 1841.
