= Thomas Norton =

English lawyer, politician, writer, and playwright (1532 – 1584)

Thomas Norton (1532 – 10 March 1584) was an English lawyer, politician, writer of verse, and playwright.

== Official career ==
Norton was born in London, the son of Thomas Norton and the former Elizabeth Merry. He was educated at Cambridge. He became a secretary to Edward Seymour, 1st Duke of Somerset. In 1555 he was admitted as a student at the Inner Temple. He married Margery Cranmer, the daughter of Archbishop Thomas Cranmer and his wife Margarete, with whom he had no children. Margery died before 1568. In 1568, Thomas married Alice Cranmer, the daughter of Archdeacon Edmund Cranmer, the brother of the Archbishop of Canterbury, with whom he did have issue.

Norton served in Parliament as the representative of Gatton. In 1562 he became M.P. for Berwick, and was active in politics. He became the unofficial leader of a group of about fifty members of the House of Commons, which G. R. Elton saw as the first semi-official opposition in Parliament. He was inspired by the religious views of his father-in-law, and was in possession of Cranmer's manuscript code of ecclesiastical law; this he permitted John Foxe to publish in 1571. He went to Rome on legal business, in 1579. From 1580 to 1583 he frequently visited the Channel Islands as a commissioner to inquire into the status of these possessions.

Norton was the first Remembrancer of the City of London, holding the office from 1570 until his death in 1584.

Norton's Calvinism grew, and towards the end of his career he became a fanatic. Norton held several interrogation sessions in the Tower of London using torture instruments such as the rack. His punishment of the Catholics, as their official censor from 1581 onwards, led to his being nicknamed "Rackmaster-General" and "Rackmaster Norton".

Norton's puritanism made him objectionable to the English bishops; he was deprived of his office and thrown into the Tower. Francis Walsingham released him, but Norton's health was undermined, and in March 1584 he died in his house at Sharpenhoe, Bedfordshire.

== Literature ==
From his eighteenth year Norton began to compose verse. With Jasper Heywood he was a writer of sonnets. He contributed to Tottel's Miscellany, and in 1560 he co-authored, along with Thomas Sackville, the earliest English tragedy, Gorboduc, which was performed before Elizabeth I in the Inner Temple on 18 January 1561.

Gorboduc was revised, as The Tragedy of Ferrex and Porrex in 1570. Norton's early lyrics have mostly disappeared. His numerous anti-Catholic pamphlets include those on the rebellion of Northumberland and on the projected marriage of Mary, Queen of Scots, to the Duke of Norfolk. Norton also translated Calvin's Institutes (1561) and Alexander Nowell's Catechism (1570).

Gorboduc was edited by William Durrant Cooper (Shakespeare Society, 1847), and Lucy Toulmin Smith in Karl Vollmöller's Englische Sprache-und Literatur-denkmale (1883).
