= Thirty Days Hath September =

Traditional mnemonic verse

"Thirty Days Hath September", or "Thirty days has September", is a traditional verse mnemonic used to remember the number of days in the months of the Julian and Gregorian calendars. It arose as an oral tradition and exists in many variants. It is currently earliest attested in English, but was and remains common throughout Europe as well. Full:

Thirty days has September,
April, June, and November,
All the rest have thirty-one,
Save February at twenty-eight,
But leap year, coming once in four,
February then has one day more.

An alternative version goes: April, June and November all the rest have 31 but February has 28 we done.

An alternative version goes:

Thirty days hath September,
April, June, and November.
All the rest have thirty-one,
Except February alone.
Which hath twenty-eight days clear,
And twenty-nine in each leap year.

== History ==
The irregularity of the lengths of the months descends from the Roman calendar, which came to be adopted throughout Europe and then worldwide. The months of Rome's original lunar calendar would have varied between 29 and 30 days, depending on observations of the phases of the moon. Reforms credited to Romulus and Numa established a set year of twelve fixed months. Possibly under the influence of the Pythagoreans in southern Italy, Rome considered odd numbers more lucky and set the lengths of the new months to 29 and 31 days, apart from the last month February and the intercalary month Mercedonius. Its imperfect system and political manipulation of intercalation caused it to slip greatly out of alignment with the solar year, which was known to consist of 1/4 of 1461 days (rather than 1460 days) by the time of Meton in the 5th century BC. Rather than adopt a new system like the Egyptian calendar, which had 12 months of 30 days each and a set, annual intercalary month of 5 days, Caesar aimed for his 46 BC reform to maintain as much continuity as possible with the old calendar. Ultimately, Mercedonius was removed, the four existing 31-day months were maintained, February was left unchanged apart from leap years, and the needed additional ten days of the year were added to the 29-day months to make them either 30 or 31 days long.

By the Renaissance, the irregularity of the resulting system had inspired Latin verses to remember the order of long and short months. The first known published form appeared in a 1488 edition of the Latin verses of Anianus:

Junius Aprilis September et ipse November
Dant triginta dies reliquis supadditur unus
De quorum numero Februarius excipiatur.

Translation:

June, April, September, and November itself
Give thirty days, the rest add one more,
From which number February is excepted.

In 2011, the Welsh author Roger Bryan discovered an older English form of the poem written at the bottom of a page of saints' days for February within a Latin manuscript in the British Library's Harleian manuscripts. He dated the entry to 1425 ±20 years.

Thirti dayes hath Novembir
April June and Septembir.
Of xxviij is but oon
And alle the remenaunt xxx and j

Translation:

Thirty days has November,
April, June, and September.
Of 28 is but one
And all the remnant 30 and 1.

The first published English version appeared in Richard Grafton's Abridgment of the Chronicles of England in 1562 as "A Rule to Know How Many Dayes Euery Moneth in the Yere Hath":

Thirty dayes hath Nouember,
Aprill, Iune and September.
February hath xxviij alone,
And all the rest have xxxi.

Translation:

Thirty days hath November,
April, June, and September.
February hath 28 alone,
And all the rest have 31.

"September" and "November" have identical rhythm and rhyme and are thus poetically interchangeable. The early versions tended to favour November and as late as 1891 it was being given as the more common form of the rhyme in some parts of the United States. It is less common now and September variants have a long history as well. A manuscript copy of the verse from c. 1555 runs:

Thirty days hath September,
April, June, and November;
All the rest have thirty-one,
Excepting February alone,
And that has twenty-eight days clear
And twenty-nine in each leap year.

An alternate version of this verse, published in 1827, runs:

Thirty days hath September,
April, June, and November;
All the rest have thirty-one,
Excepting February alone.
To which we twenty-eight assign,
Till leap year gives it twenty-nine.

Another version, published in 1844, runs:

Learned in Irish School & in the home.
Thirty days has September,
April, June, and November.
All the rest have thirty-one,
Except for February, once in 4,
Then February has one day more.

Oola N.S Co. Limerick, Ireland / O'Brien family

Thirty days has September,
April, June, and November;
All the rest have thirty-one,
Excepting Feb-ru-a-ry alone,
Which has twenty-eight, nay, more,
Has twenty-nine one year in four.

Another English version from before 1574 is found in a manuscript among the Mostyn Papers held at the National Library of Wales in Aberystwyth.

Variants appear throughout Europe. The typical Italian form is:

Trenta giorni ha novembre
con aprile, giugno e settembre.
Di ventotto ce n'è uno.
Tutti gli altri ne han trentuno.

Translation:

Thirty days have November,
April, June, and September.
With 28 there is but one.
All the rest have thirty-one.

== Legacy ==
The various forms of the poem are usually considered a doggerel nursery rhyme. In the c. 1601 academic drama Return from Parnassus, Sir Raderic's overenthusiastic appreciation of its poetry is of a piece with his own low level of culture and education.

It has, however, also earned praise. It has been called "one of the most popular and oft-repeated verses in the English language" and "probably the only sixteenth-century poem most ordinary citizens know by heart". Groucho Marx claimed "My favorite poem is the one that starts 'Thirty Days Hath September...', because it actually means something." On the other hand, the unhelpfulness of such an involved mnemonic has been mocked, as in the early-20th-century parody "Thirty days hath September / But all the rest I can't remember." It continues to be taught in schools as children learn the calendar, although others employ the knuckle mnemonic instead.

"Thirty Days Hath September" is also occasionally parodied or referenced in wider culture, such as the 1960 Burma-Shave jingle "Thirty days / Hath September / April / June and the / Speed offender".

== See also ==
- Roman, Julian, and Gregorian calendars
- Day and month
- Knuckle mnemonic
