= Edward Whitchurch =

English publisher

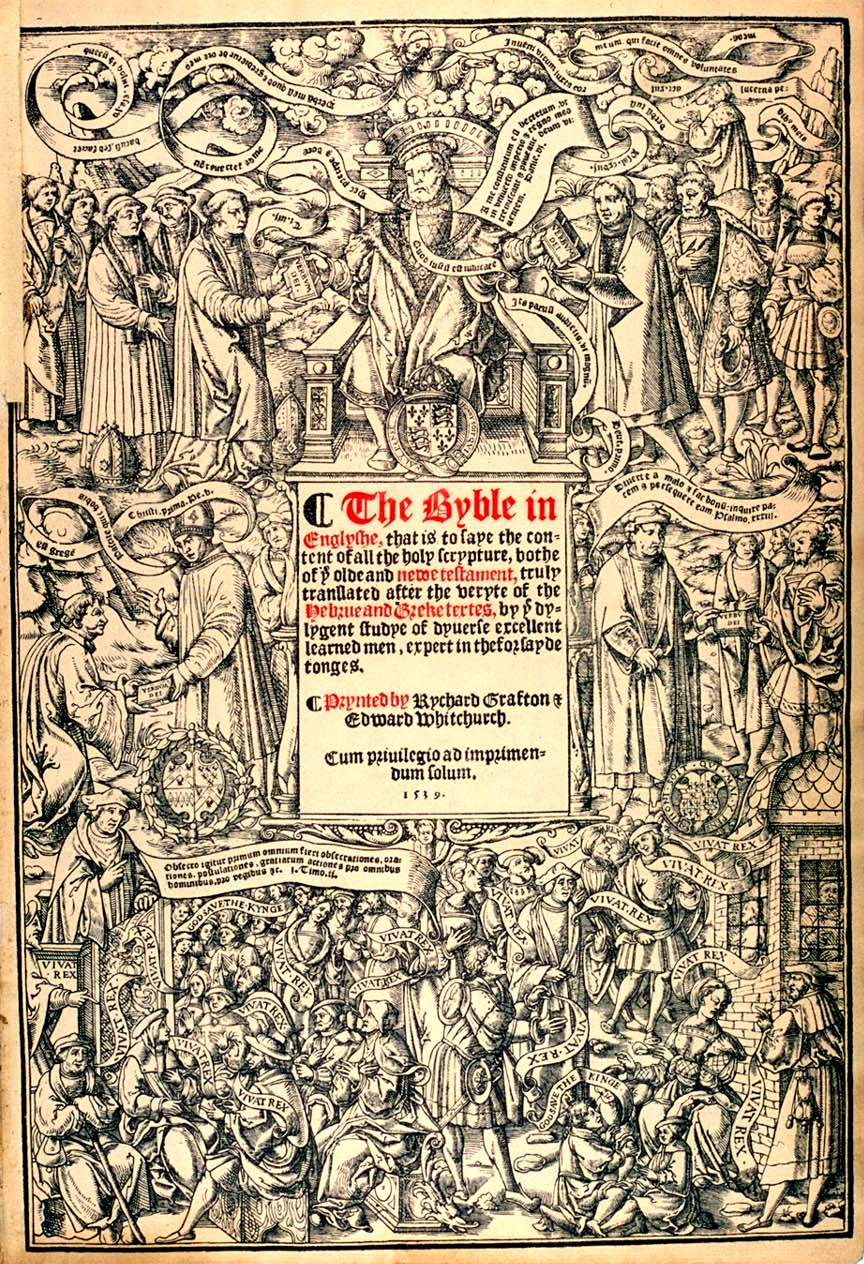
The title-page of the Great Bible; "Prynted by Rychard Grafton & Edward Whitchurch"

Edward Whitchurch (Pseudonym: Robert Stoughton; died 1561) was a London printer and publisher of Protestant works.

Whitchurch and Richard Grafton jointly published the first complete version of the Bible in English in 1539. Other published works included the 1547 A Treatise of Morall Phylosophie, contayning the Sayinges of the Wyse, by William Baldwin, and the Paraphrases of Erasmus in 1548.

After Thomas Cromwell's fall and execution, Whitchurch and Grafton were sent to prison on 8 April 1543, but they were released on 3 May. On 28 January 1543-4, together Grafton and Whitchurch received an exclusive patent for printing church service books and on 28 May 1546 they were also granted an exclusive right to print primers in Latin and English.

In 1549, he employed five assistants.

Merton Abbey was closed by Henry VIII as part of the Dissolution of the Monasteries and the estate sold. Edward Whitchurch and Lionel Dutchet purchased it, but left for Europe when Queen Mary came to the throne. The site then came into the ownership of the Garth family.

After the accession of Mary, he left England, possibly to Germany, and later married Margaret, widow of Archbishop Cranmer in 1556.

== See also ==
- Yny lhyvyr hwnn
