= Thomas Cranmer =

Archbishop of Canterbury from 1533 to 1555

- Archbishop of Canterbury
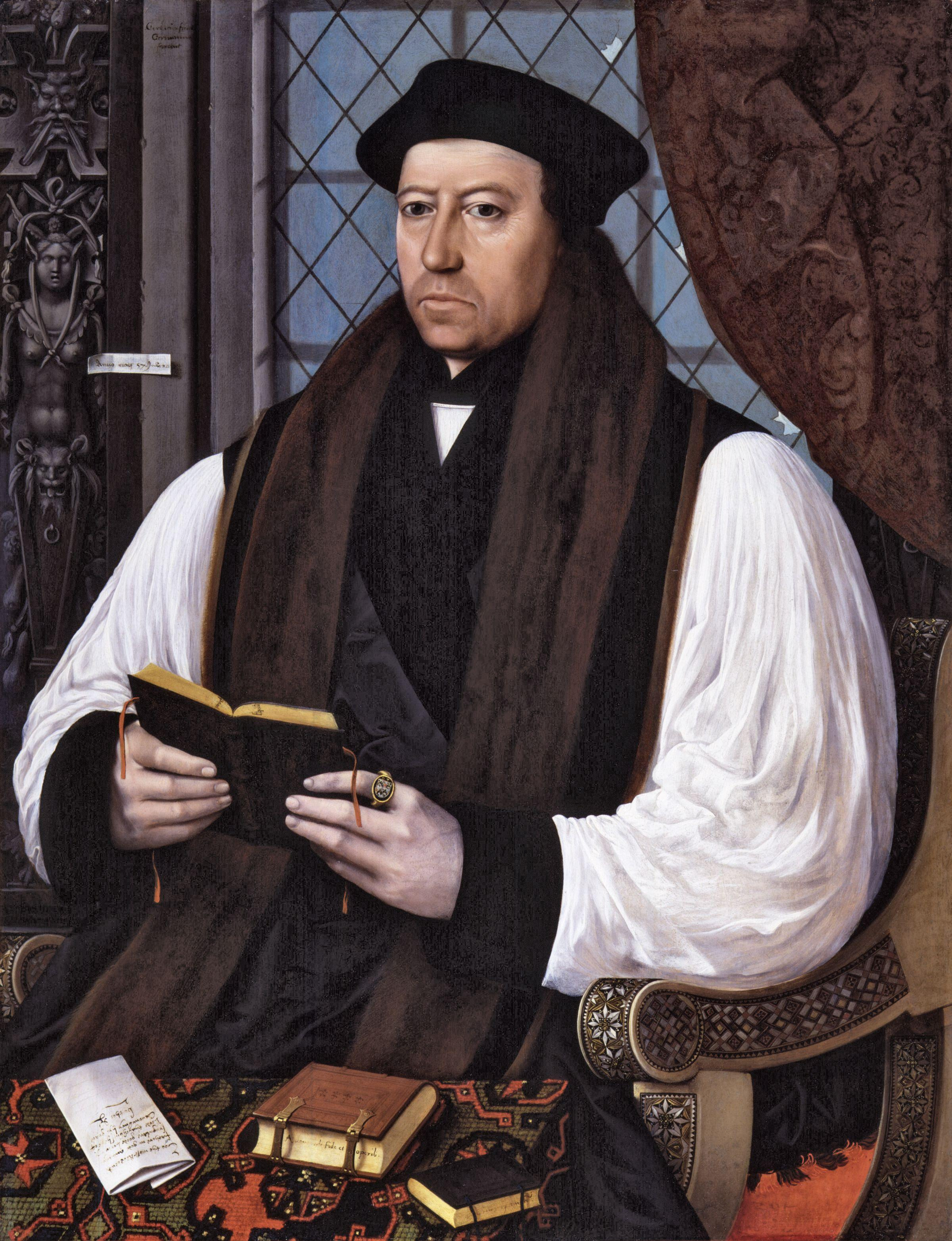
- Portrait, 1545
- Church: Church of England
- Diocese: Canterbury
- Installed: 3 December 1533
- Term ended: 4 December 1555
- Predecessor: William Warham
- Successor: Reginald Pole

Orders
- Consecration: 30 March 1533 by John Longland

Personal details
- Born: 2 July 1489 Aslockton, Nottinghamshire, England
- Died: 21 March 1556 (aged 66) Oxford, England
- Denomination: Protestantism (Anglicanism)
- Spouse: Margarete Cranmer
- Education: Jesus College, Cambridge
- Signature: Thomas Cranmer's signature

Sainthood
- Feast day: 21 March
- Venerated in: Anglicanism

Thomas Cranmer (2 July 1489 – 21 March 1556) was an English theologian who was a leader of the English Reformation and served as Archbishop of Canterbury from 1533 to 1555, during the reigns of Henry VIII, Edward VI and, for a short time, Mary I. He is honoured as a martyr in the Church of England.

Cranmer was ordained a Catholic priest and served on the theology faculty at the University of Cambridge. At the behest of Cardinal Thomas Wolsey, he later served Henry VIII as a diplomat in Europe. Cranmer helped to build the case for the annulment of Henry's marriage to Catherine of Aragon, which was one of the causes of the separation of the English Church from union with the Holy See. Along with Thomas Cromwell, he supported the principle of royal supremacy, in which the king was considered sovereign over the Church within his realm and protector of his people from the abuses of Rome. During Cranmer's tenure as Archbishop of Canterbury, he established the first doctrinal and liturgical structures of the reformed Church of England. Under Henry's rule, Cranmer did not make many radical changes in the Church due to power struggles between religious conservatives and reformers. He published the first officially authorised vernacular (English) service, the Exhortation and Litany.

When Edward, who was devout and had been raised in the tenets of a reformed Church, came to the throne in 1547, Cranmer was able to promote faster changes. He wrote and compiled the first two editions of the Book of Common Prayer, a complete liturgy for the English Church, turning to the language of the people. With the assistance of several Continental reformers to whom he gave refuge, he changed doctrine or discipline in areas such as the Eucharist, clerical celibacy, the role of images in places of worship, and the veneration of saints. Cranmer promulgated the new doctrines through the prayer book, the Homilies and other publications.

After the accession of the Catholic Mary I in 1553, Cranmer was put on trial for treason and heresy. Imprisoned for over two years and under pressure from state and Church authorities, he made several recantations and reconciled himself with the Catholic Church. While this would have customarily absolved him from the heresy charge, Mary wanted him executed on the treason charge, and he was burned at the stake on 21 March 1556; on the day of his execution, he publicly withdrew his recantations, to die a heretic to Catholics and a martyr for the principles of the English Reformation. Cranmer's death was immortalised in Foxe's Book of Martyrs and his legacy lives on within the Church of England through the Book of Common Prayer and the Thirty-nine Articles, an Anglican statement of faith derived from his work.

== Origins ==
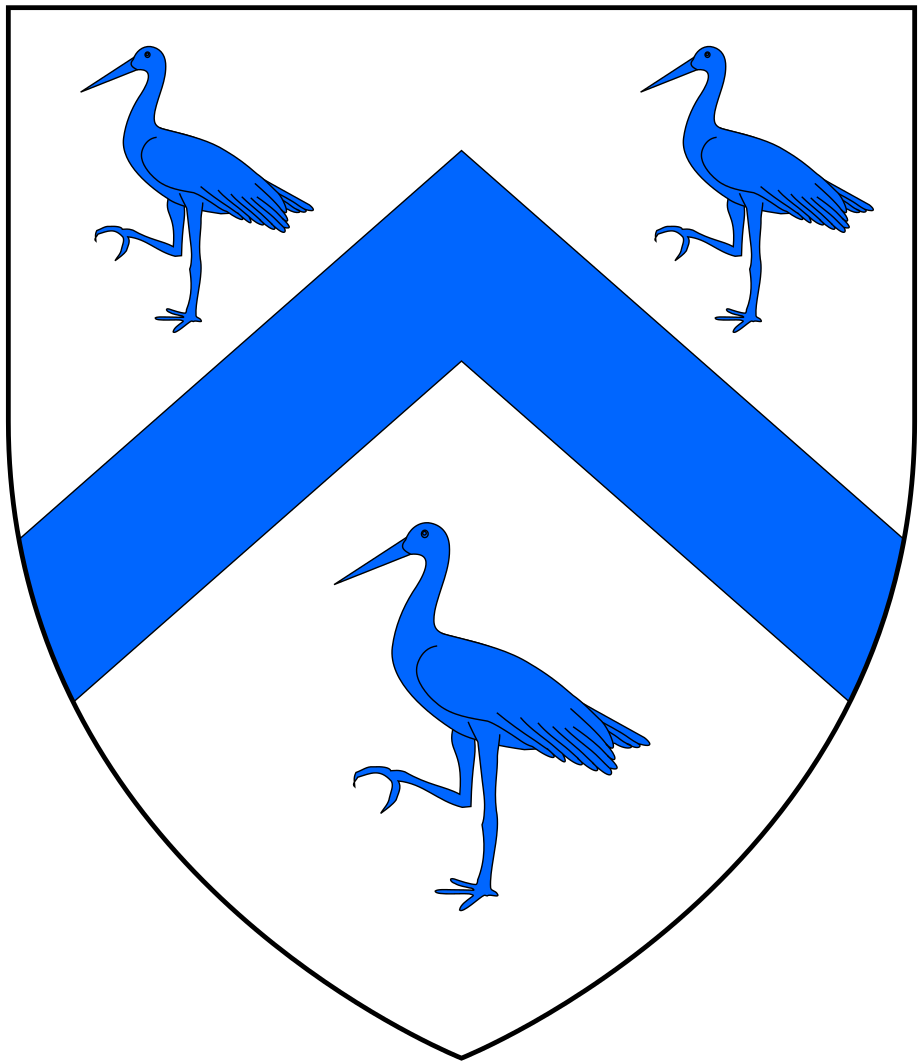
Cranmer's paternal canting arms: Argent, a chevron between three cranes azure

Cranmer was born in 1489 at Aslockton in Nottinghamshire, England. He was a younger son of Thomas Cranmer by his wife Agnes Hatfield. Thomas Cranmer was of modest wealth but was from an established armigerous gentry family which took its name from the manor of Cranmer in Lincolnshire. A ledger stone to one of his relatives in the Church of St John of Beverley, Whatton, near Aslockton is inscribed as follows: Hic jacet Thomas Cranmer, Armiger, qui obiit vicesimo septimo die mensis Maii, anno d(omi)ni. MD centesimo primo, cui(us) a(n)i(ma)e p(ro)p(i)cietur Deus Amen ("here lies Thomas Cranmer, Esquire, who died on the 27th day of May in the year of our lord 1501, on whose soul may God look upon with mercy"). The arms of the Cranmer and Aslockton families are displayed. The figure is that of a man with flowing hair and gown and a purse on his right side. Their oldest son, John Cranmer, inherited the family estate, while Thomas and his younger brother, Edmund, were placed on the path to clerical careers.

== Early years (1489–1527) ==
Historians know nothing definite about Cranmer's early schooling. He probably attended a grammar school in his village. At 14, two years after his father's death, he was sent to the newly created Jesus College, Cambridge. It took him eight years to attain his Bachelor of Arts degree, following a curriculum of logic, classical literature, and philosophy. During this time, he began to collect medieval scholastic books, which he preserved faithfully throughout his life. For his master's degree he studied the humanists Jacques Lefèvre d'Étaples and Erasmus. He finished the course in three years. Shortly after receiving his Master of Arts degree in 1515, he was elected to a fellowship of Jesus College.

Sometime after Cranmer took his MA, he married a woman named Joan. Although he was not yet a priest, he was obliged to give up his fellowship, resulting in losing his residence at Jesus College. To support himself and his wife, he took a job as a reader at Buckingham Hall (later reformed as Magdalene College). When Joan died during her first childbirth, Jesus College showed its regard for Cranmer by reinstating his fellowship. He began studying theology, and by 1520, he had been ordained, the university already having named him as one of its preachers. He received his Doctor of Divinity degree in 1526.

Not much is known about Cranmer's thoughts and experiences during his three decades at Cambridge. Traditionally, he has been portrayed as a humanist whose enthusiasm for biblical scholarship prepared him to adopt Lutheran ideas, which were spreading during the 1520s. A study of his marginalia reveals an early antipathy to Martin Luther and an admiration for Erasmus. When Cardinal Wolsey, the King's Lord Chancellor, selected several Cambridge scholars, including Edward Lee, Stephen Gardiner and Richard Sampson, to be diplomats throughout Europe, Cranmer was chosen for an embassy to Charles V, Holy Roman Emperor. His supposed participation in an earlier embassy to Spain mentioned in the older literature, has proved to be spurious.

== In the service of Henry VIII (1527–1532) ==
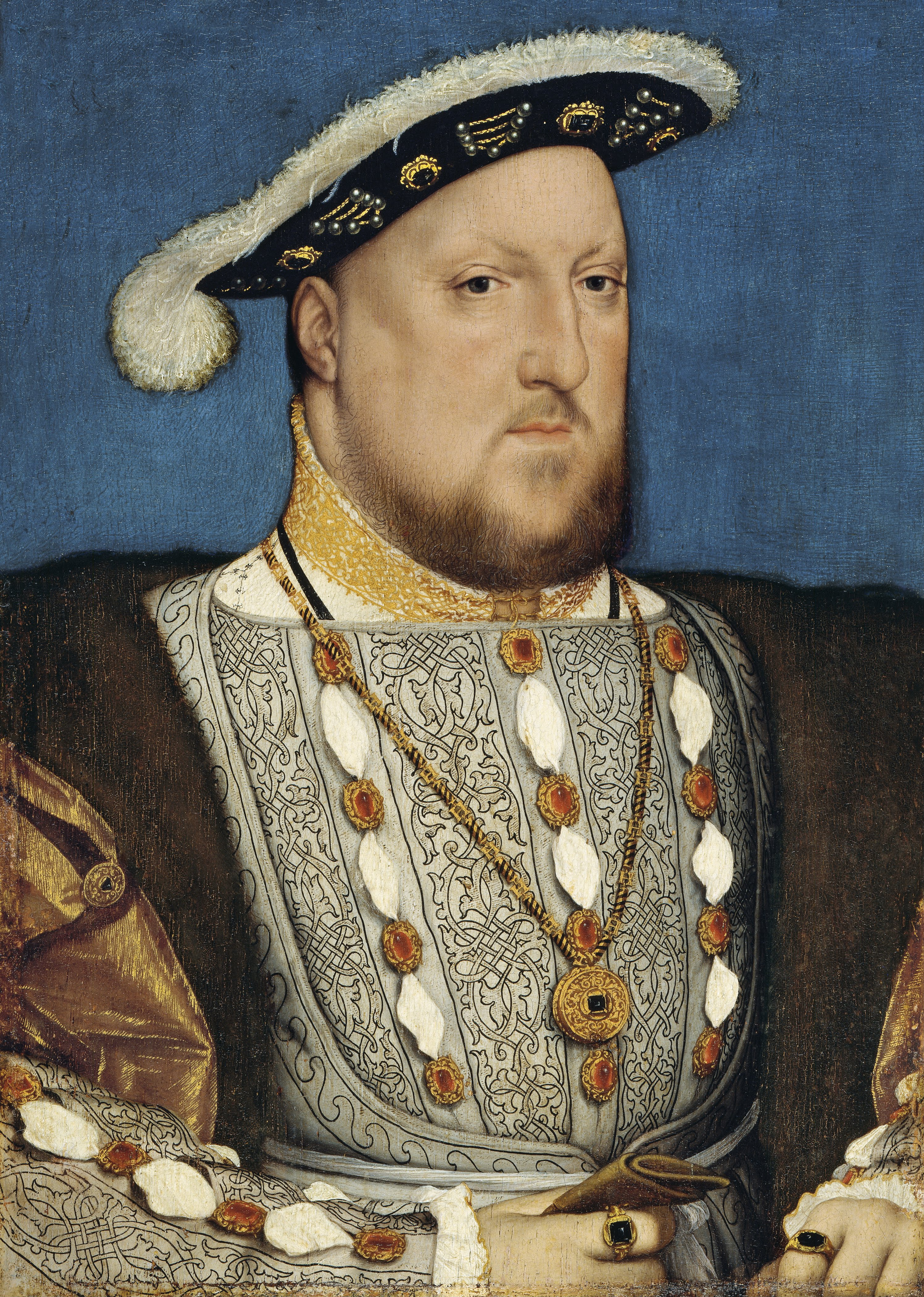
Henry VIII recognised Cranmer's value in obtaining support for the annulment of his marriage with Catherine of Aragon. Portrait by Hans Holbein the Younger, c. 1536

Henry VIII's first marriage arose from the death of his older brother, Arthur, in 1502. Their father, Henry VII, betrothed Arthur's widow, Catherine of Aragon, to the future king. The marriage immediately raised questions about the biblical prohibition (in Leviticus 18 and 20) against marriage to a brother's wife. The couple married in 1509, and after a series of miscarriages, a daughter, Mary, was born in 1516. By the 1520s, Henry still did not have a son to name as heir, and he took this as a sure sign of God's anger and made overtures to the Vatican about an annulment. He gave Cardinal Wolsey the task of prosecuting his case; Wolsey began by consulting university experts. From 1527, Cranmer assisted with the annulment proceedings in addition to his duties as a Cambridge don.

In mid-1529, Cranmer stayed with relatives in Waltham Holy Cross to avoid an outbreak of the plague in Cambridge. Two of his Cambridge associates, Stephen Gardiner and Edward Foxe, joined him. The three discussed the annulment issue and Cranmer suggested putting aside the legal case in Rome in favour of a general canvassing of opinions from university theologians throughout Europe. Henry showed much interest in the idea when Gardiner and Foxe presented him with this plan. It is unknown whether the King or his new Lord Chancellor, Thomas More, explicitly approved the plan. Eventually, it was implemented, and Cranmer was requested to join the royal team in Rome to gather university opinions. Edward Foxe coordinated the research effort and the team produced the Collectanea satis copiosa ("The Sufficiently Abundant Collections") and The Determinations, historical and theological support for the argument that the King exercised supreme jurisdiction within his realm.

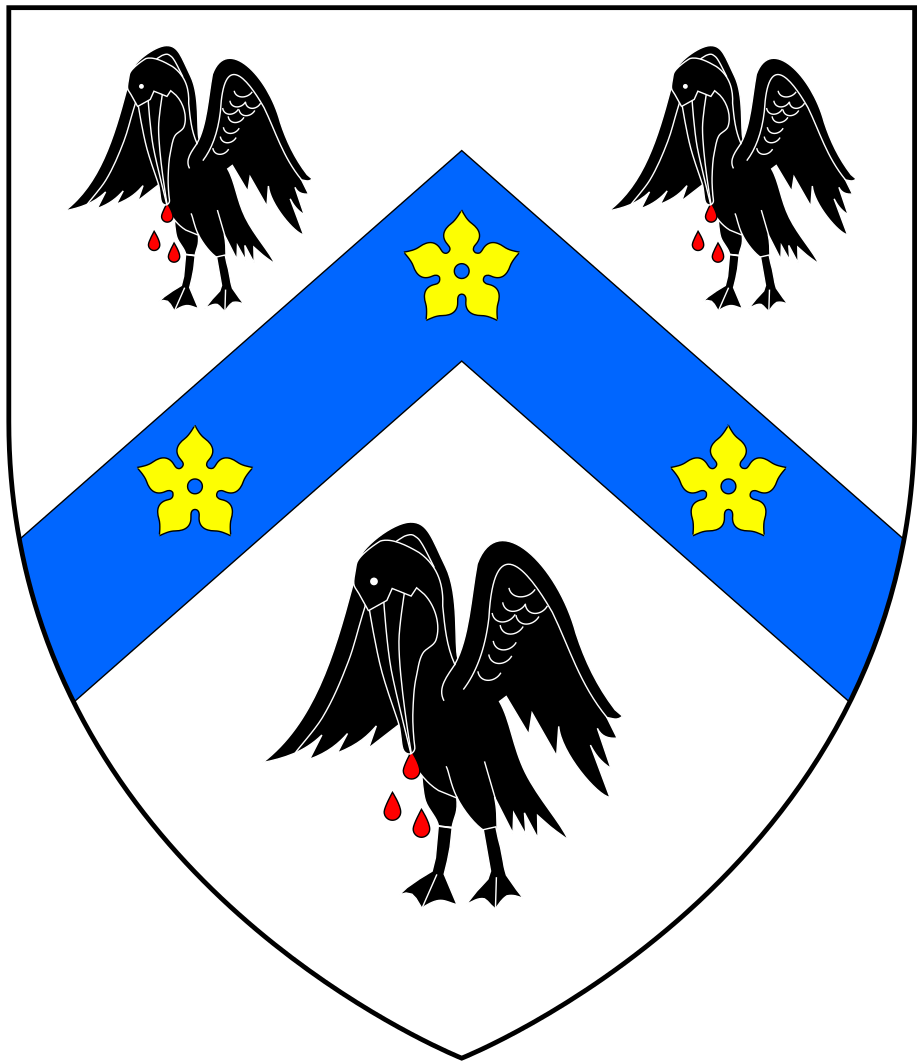
New arms granted circa 1544 to Thomas Cranmer by King Henry VIII, instead of his paternal arms: Argent, on a chevron azure between three pelicans sable vulning themselves proper as many cinquefoils or, telling him "That those birds should signify unto him, that he ought to be ready, as the pelican is, to shed his blood for his young ones, brought up in the faith of Christ"

Cranmer's first contact with a Continental reformer was with Simon Grynaeus, a humanist based in Basel, Switzerland, and a follower of the Swiss reformers, Huldrych Zwingli and Johannes Oecolampadius. In mid-1531, Grynaeus took an extended visit to England to offer himself as an intermediary between the King and the Continental reformers. He struck up a friendship with Cranmer and after his return to Basel, he wrote about Cranmer to the German reformer Martin Bucer in Strasbourg. Grynaeus' early contacts initiated Cranmer's eventual relationship with the Strasbourg and Swiss reformers.

In January 1532, Cranmer was appointed the resident ambassador at the court of the Holy Roman Emperor, Charles V. As the Emperor travelled throughout his realms, Cranmer had to follow him to his residence in Regensburg. He passed through the Lutheran city of Nuremberg and saw for the first time the effects of the Reformation. When the Imperial Diet was moved to Nuremberg, he met the leading architect of the Nuremberg reforms, Andreas Osiander. They became good friends, and during that July Cranmer took the surprising action of marrying Margarete, the niece of Osiander's wife. He did not take her as his mistress, as was the prevailing custom with priests for whom celibacy was too rigorous. Scholars note that Cranmer had moved, however moderately at this stage, into identifying with certain Lutheran principles. This progress in his personal life was not matched in his political life as he was unable to persuade Charles, Catherine's nephew, to support the annulment of his aunt's marriage.

== Appointed Archbishop of Canterbury (1532–1534) ==
While Cranmer was following Charles through Italy, he received a royal letter dated 1 October 1532 informing him that he had been appointed the new Archbishop of Canterbury, following the death of Archbishop William Warham. Cranmer was ordered to return to England. The appointment had been secured by the family of Anne Boleyn, who was being courted by Henry. When Cranmer's promotion became known in London, it caused great surprise as Cranmer had previously held only minor positions in the Church. Anne Boleyn and her family had supported Cranmer who became archbishop of Canterbury. Cranmer left Mantua on 19 November and arrived in England at the beginning of January. Henry personally financed the papal bulls necessary for Cranmer's promotion to Canterbury. The bulls were easily acquired because the papal nuncio was under orders from Rome to please the English in an effort to prevent a final breach. The bulls arrived around 26 March 1533 and Cranmer was consecrated as a bishop on 30 March in St Stephen's Chapel, by John Longland, Bishop of Lincoln; John Vesey, Bishop of Exeter; and Henry Standish, Bishop of St Asaph. Even while they were waiting for the bulls, Cranmer continued to work on the annulment proceedings, which required greater urgency after Anne announced her pregnancy. Henry and Anne were secretly married on 24 or 25 January 1533 in the presence of a handful of witnesses. Cranmer did not learn of the marriage until 14 days later.

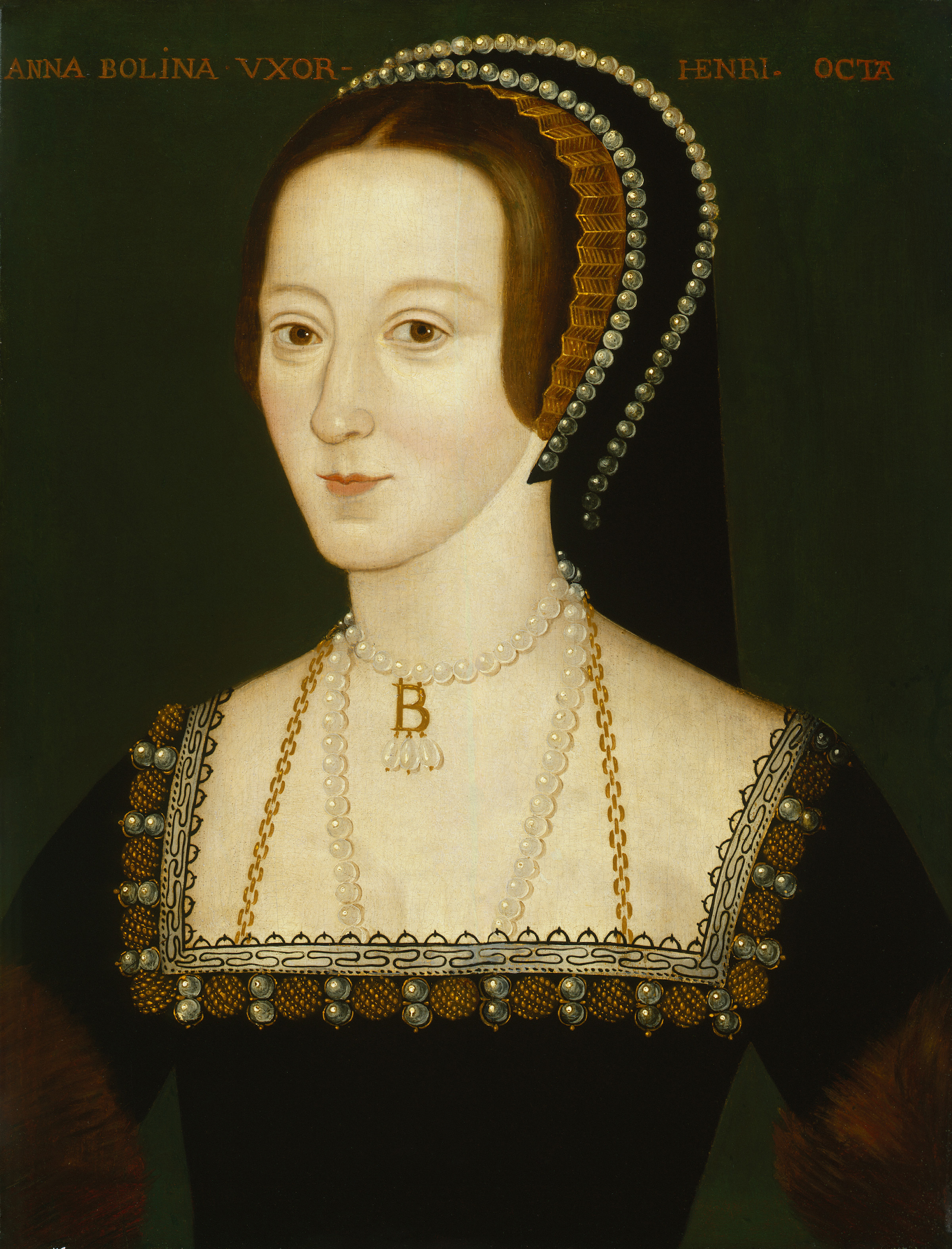
The family of Anne Boleyn secured the appointment of Cranmer as Archbishop of Canterbury. Later portrait by an unknown artist.

For the next few months, Cranmer and the King worked on establishing legal procedures on how the monarch's marriage would be judged by his most senior clergy. Several drafts of the procedures have been preserved in letters written between the two. Once procedures were agreed upon, Cranmer opened court sessions on 10 May, inviting Henry and Catherine of Aragon to appear. Gardiner represented the King; Catherine did not appear or send a proxy. On 23 May Cranmer pronounced the judgement that Henry's marriage with Catherine was against the law of God. He even issued a threat of excommunication if Henry did not stay away from Catherine. Henry was now free to marry and, on 28 May, Cranmer validated Henry and Anne's marriage. On 1 June, Cranmer personally crowned and anointed Anne queen and delivered to her the sceptre and rod. Pope Clement VII was furious at this defiance, but he could not take decisive action as he was pressured by other monarchs to avoid an irreparable breach with England. On 9 July he provisionally excommunicated Henry and his advisers (who included Cranmer) unless he repudiated Anne by the end of September. Henry kept Anne as his wife and, on 7 September, Anne gave birth to Elizabeth. Cranmer baptised her immediately afterwards and acted as one of her godparents.

It is difficult to assess how Cranmer's theological views had evolved since his Cambridge days. There is evidence that he continued to support humanism; he renewed Erasmus' pension that had previously been granted by Archbishop Warham. In June 1533, he was confronted with the difficult tasks not only of disciplining a reformer, but also of seeing him burned at the stake. John Frith was condemned to death for his views on the eucharist: he denied the real presence. Cranmer personally tried to persuade him to change his views without success. Although he rejected Frith's radicalism, by 1534 he clearly signalled that he had broken with Rome and that he had set a new theological course. He supported the cause of reform by gradually replacing the old guard in his ecclesiastical province with men such as Hugh Latimer who followed the new thinking. He intervened in religious disputes, supporting reformers, to the disappointment of religious conservatives who desired to maintain the link with Rome.

== Under the vicegerency (1535–1538) ==
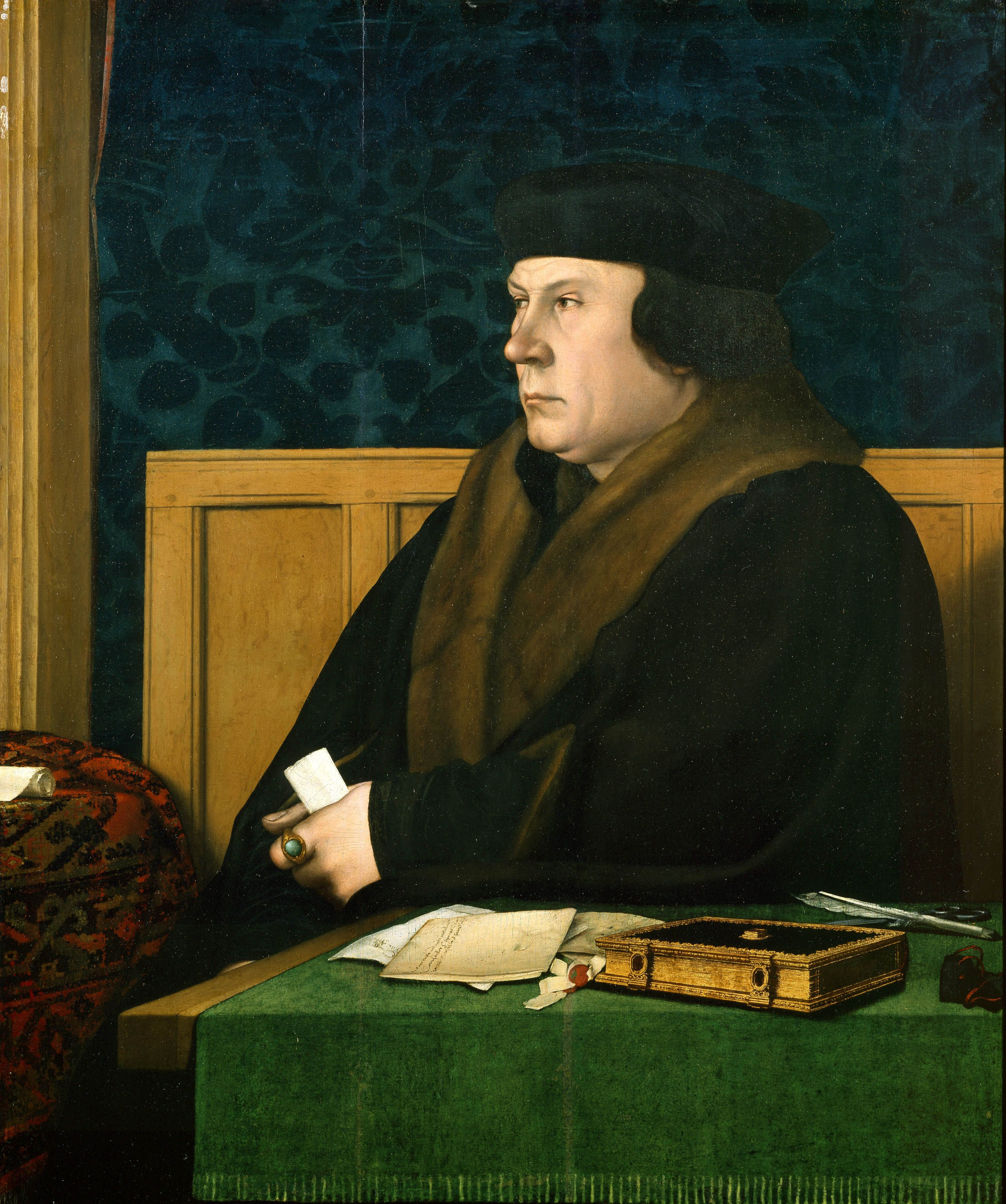
Thomas Cromwell was the vicegerent acting as the main agent for the king over spiritual matters. Portrait by Hans Holbein, 1532–1533.

Cranmer was not immediately accepted by the bishops within his province. When he attempted a canonical visitation, he had to avoid locations where a resident conservative bishop might make an embarrassing personal challenge to his authority. In 1535, Cranmer had difficult encounters with several bishops, John Stokesley, John Longland, and Stephen Gardiner among others. They objected to Cranmer's power and title and argued that the Act of Supremacy did not define his role. This prompted Thomas Cromwell, the King's chief minister, to activate and to take the office of the vicegerent, the deputy supreme head of ecclesiastical affairs. He created another set of institutions that gave a clear structure to the royal supremacy. Hence, the archbishop was eclipsed by Vicegerent Cromwell in regard to the King's spiritual jurisdiction. There is no evidence that Cranmer resented his position as junior partner. Although he was an exceptional scholar, he lacked the political ability to outface even clerical opponents. Those tasks were left to Cromwell.

On 29 January 1536, when Anne miscarried a son, the King began to reflect again on the biblical prohibitions that had haunted him during his marriage with Catherine of Aragon. Shortly after the miscarriage, the King started to take an interest in Jane Seymour. By 24 April, he had commissioned Cromwell to prepare the case for a divorce. Unaware of these plans, Cranmer had continued to write letters to Cromwell on minor matters up to 22 April. Anne was sent to the Tower of London on 2 May, and Cranmer was urgently summoned by Cromwell. On the very next day, Cranmer wrote a letter to the King expressing his doubts about the Queen's guilt, highlighting his own esteem for Anne. After it was delivered, Cranmer was resigned to the fact that the end of Anne's marriage was inevitable. On 16 May, he saw Anne in the Tower and heard her confession and the following day, he pronounced the marriage null and void. Two days later, Anne was executed; Cranmer was one of the few who publicly mourned her death.

The vicegerency brought the pace of reforms under the control of the King. A balance was instituted between the conservatives and the reformers and this was seen in the Ten Articles, the first attempt at defining the beliefs of the Henrician Church. The articles had a two-part structure. The first five articles showed the influence of the reformers by recognising only three of the former seven sacraments: baptism, eucharist, and penance. The last five articles concerned the roles of images, saints, rites and ceremonies, and purgatory, and they reflected the views of the traditionalists. Two early drafts of the document have been preserved and show different teams of theologians at work. The competition between the conservatives and reformers is revealed in rival editorial corrections made by Cranmer and Cuthbert Tunstall, the bishop of Durham. The end product had something that pleased and annoyed both sides of the debate. By 11 July, Cranmer, Cromwell, and the Convocation, the general assembly of the clergy, had subscribed to the Ten Articles.

In late 1536, the north of England was convulsed in a series of uprisings collectively known as the Pilgrimage of Grace, the most serious opposition to Henry's policies. Cromwell and Cranmer were the primary targets of the protesters' fury. Cromwell and the King worked furiously to quell the rebellion, while Cranmer kept a low profile. After it was clear that Henry's regime was safe, the government took the initiative to remedy the evident inadequacy of the Ten Articles. The outcome after months of debate was The Institution of a Christian Man informally known from the first issue as the Bishops' Book. The book was initially proposed in February 1537 in the first vicegerential synod, ordered by Cromwell, for the whole Church. Cromwell opened the proceedings, but as the synod progressed, Cranmer and Foxe took on the chairmanship and the co-ordination. Foxe did most of the final editing and the book was published in late September.

Even after publication, the book's status remained vague because the King had not given his full support to it. In a draft letter, Henry noted that he had not read the book, but supported its printing. His attention was most likely occupied by the pregnancy of Jane Seymour and the birth of the male heir, Edward, that Henry had sought for so long. Jane died shortly after giving birth and her funeral was held on 12 November. That month Henry started to work on the Bishops' Book; his amendments were sent to Cranmer, Sampson, and others for comment. Cranmer's responses to the King were far more confrontational than his colleagues' and he wrote at much greater length. They reveal unambiguous statements supporting reformed theology such as justification by faith or sola fide (faith alone) and predestination. His words did not convince the King. A new statement of faith was delayed until 1543 with the publication of the King's Book.

In 1538, the King and Cromwell arranged with Lutheran princes to have detailed discussions on forming a political and religious alliance. Henry had been seeking a new embassy from the Schmalkaldic League since mid-1537. The Lutherans were delighted by this and they sent a joint delegation from various German cities, including a colleague of Martin Luther's, Friedrich Myconius. The delegates arrived in England on 27 May 1538. After initial meetings with the King, Cromwell, and Cranmer, discussions on theological differences were transferred to Lambeth Palace under Cranmer's chairmanship. Progress on an agreement was slow partly owing to Cromwell being too busy to help expedite the proceedings and partly because the negotiating team on the English side was evenly balanced between conservatives and reformers. The talks dragged on with the Germans becoming weary despite the Archbishop's strenuous efforts. The negotiations were fatally neutralised by an appointee of the King. Cranmer's colleague, Edward Foxe, who sat on Henry's Privy Council, had died earlier in the year. The King chose as his replacement Cranmer's conservative rival, Cuthbert Tunstall, who was told to stay near Henry to give advice. On 5 August, when the German delegates sent a letter to the King regarding three items that particularly worried them (compulsory clerical celibacy, the withholding of the chalice from the laity, and the maintenance of private masses for the dead), Tunstall was able to intervene for the King and to influence the decision. The result was a thorough dismissal by the King of many of the Germans' chief concerns. Although Cranmer begged the Germans to continue with the negotiations, using the argument "to consider the many thousands of souls in England" at stake, they left on 1 October without any substantial achievements.

== Reforms reversed (1539–1542) ==
Continental reformer Philipp Melanchthon was aware that he was very much admired by Henry. In early 1539, Melanchthon wrote several letters to Henry criticising his views on religion, in particular his support of clerical celibacy. By late April another delegation from the Lutheran princes arrived to build on Melanchthon's exhortations. Cromwell wrote a letter to the King in support of the new Lutheran mission. The King had begun to change his stance and concentrated on wooing conservative opinion in England rather than reaching out to the Lutherans. On 28 April 1539, Parliament met for the first time in three years. Cranmer was present, but Cromwell was unable to attend due to ill health. On 5 May the House of Lords created a committee with the customary religious balance between conservatives and reformers to examine and determine doctrine. The committee was given little time to do the detailed work needed for a thorough revision. On 16 May, the Duke of Norfolk noted that the committee had not agreed on anything, and proposed that the Lords examine six doctrinal questions—which eventually formed the basis of the Six Articles. They affirmed the conservative interpretation of doctrines such as the real presence, clerical celibacy, and the necessity of auricular confession, the private confession of sins to a priest. As the Act of the Six Articles neared passage in Parliament, Cranmer moved his wife and children out of England to safety. Up until this time, the family was kept quietly hidden, most likely in Ford Palace in Kent. The Act passed Parliament at the end of June and it forced Latimer and Nicholas Shaxton to resign their dioceses given their outspoken opposition to the measure.

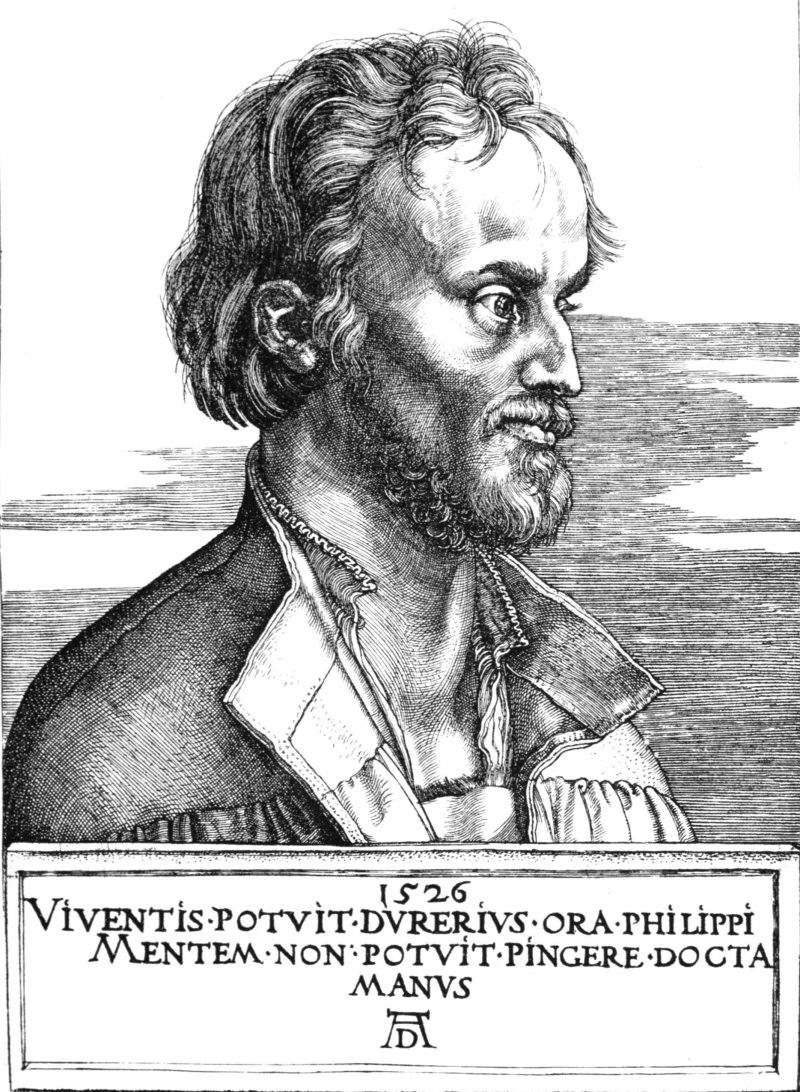
Philipp Melanchthon was the Continental reformer Henry most admired. In 1552 Cranmer invited him to participate in an ecumenical council in England. Engraving by Albrecht Dürer, 1526

The setback for the reformers was short-lived. By September, Henry was displeased with the results of the Act and its promulgators; the ever-loyal Cranmer and Cromwell were back in favour. The King asked his archbishop to write a new preface for the Great Bible, an English translation of the Bible that was first published in April 1539 under the direction of Cromwell. The preface was in the form of a sermon addressed to readers. As for Cromwell, he was delighted that his plan of a royal marriage between Henry and Anne of Cleves, the sister of a German prince was accepted by the King. In Cromwell's view, the marriage could potentially bring back contacts with the Schmalkaldic League. Henry was dismayed with Anne when they first met on 1 January 1540 but married her reluctantly on 6 January in a ceremony officiated by Cranmer. The marriage ended in disaster as Henry decided that he would request a royal divorce. This resulted in Henry being placed in an embarrassing position and Cromwell suffered the consequences. His old enemies, including the Duke of Norfolk, took advantage of the weakened Cromwell and he was arrested on 10 June. He immediately lost the support of all his friends, including Cranmer. As Cranmer had done for Anne Boleyn, he wrote a letter to the King defending the past work of Cromwell. Henry's marriage to Anne of Cleves was quickly annulled on 9 July by the vice-gerential synod, now led by Cranmer and Gardiner.

Following the annulment, Cromwell was executed on 28 July. Cranmer now found himself in a politically prominent position, with no one else to shoulder the burden. Throughout the rest of Henry's reign, he clung to Henry's authority. The King had total trust in him and in return, Cranmer could not conceal anything from the King. At the end of June 1541, Henry with his new wife, Catherine Howard, left for his first visit to the north of England. Cranmer was left in London as a member of a council taking care of matters for the King in his absence. His colleagues were Lord Chancellor Thomas Audley and Edward Seymour, Earl of Hertford. This was Cranmer's first major piece of responsibility outside the Church. In October, while the king and queen were away, a reformer named John Lascelles revealed to Cranmer that Catherine engaged in extramarital affairs. Cranmer gave the information to Audley and Seymour and they decided to wait until Henry's return. Afraid of angering the King, Audley and Seymour suggested that Cranmer inform Henry. Cranmer slipped a message to Henry during mass on All Saints Day. An investigation revealed the truth of the marital indiscretions and Catherine was executed in February 1542.

== Support from the King (1543–1547) ==
In 1543, several conservative clergymen in Kent banded together to attack and denounce two reformers, Richard Turner and John Bland, before the Privy Council. They prepared articles to present to the council, but at the last moment, additional denunciations were added by Stephen Gardiner's nephew, Germain Gardiner. These new articles attacked Cranmer and listed his misdeeds back to 1541. This document and the following actions were the basis of the so-called Prebendaries' Plot. The articles were delivered to the Council in London and were probably read on 22 April 1543. The King most likely saw the articles against Cranmer that night. The Archbishop appeared unaware that an attack on his person was made. His commissioners in Lambeth dealt specifically with Turner's case where he was acquitted, much to the fury of the conservatives.

While the plot against Cranmer proceeded, the reformers were attacked on other fronts. On 20 April, the Convocation reconvened to consider revising the Bishops' Book. Cranmer presided over the sub-committees, but the conservatives were able to overturn many reforming ideas, including justification by faith alone. On 5 May, the new revision called A Necessary Doctrine and Erudition for any Christian Man or the King's Book was released. Doctrinally, it was far more conservative than the Bishops' Book. On 10 May, the reformers received another blow. Parliament passed the Act for the Advancement of True Religion, which abolished "erroneous books" and restricted the reading of the Bible in English to those of noble status. Reformers were examined, forced to recant, or imprisoned from May to August.

For five months, Henry took no action on the accusations against his archbishop. The conspiracy was finally revealed to Cranmer by the King himself. According to Cranmer's secretary, Ralph Morice, sometime in September 1543, the King showed Cranmer a paper summarising the accusations against him. An investigation was to be mounted and Cranmer was appointed chief investigator. Surprise raids were carried out, evidence gathered, and ringleaders identified. Typically, Cranmer put the clergymen involved in the conspiracy through immediate humiliation, but he eventually forgave them and continued to use their services. To show his trust in Cranmer, Henry gave Cranmer his ring. When the Privy Council arrested Cranmer at the end of November, the nobles were hampered by the symbol of the King's trust in him. Cranmer's victory ended with two second-rank leaders imprisoned and Germain Gardiner executed.

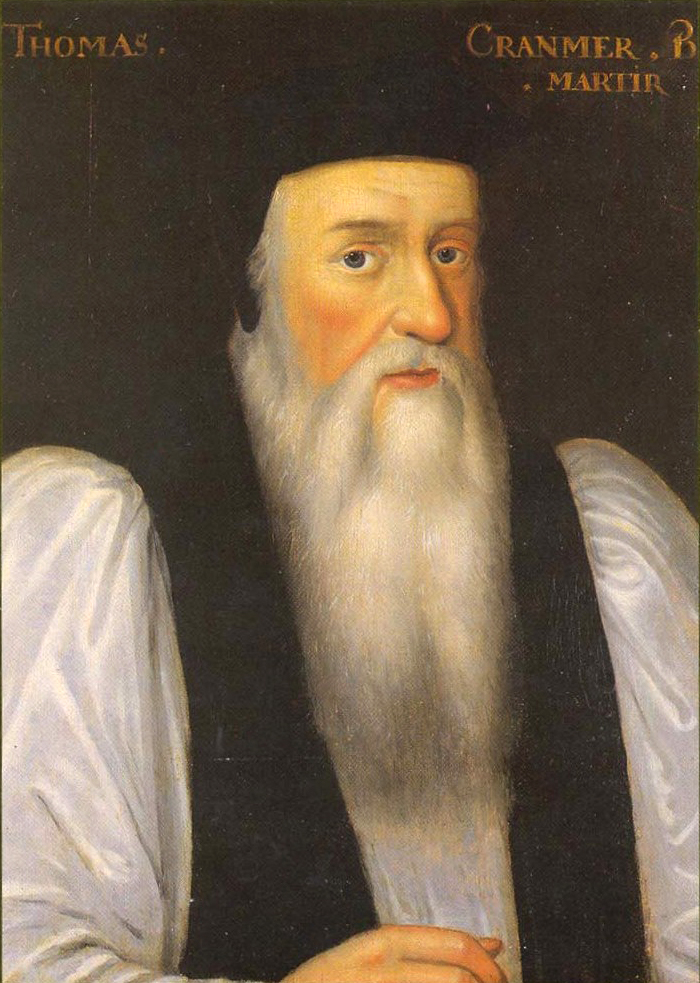
Portrait of Cranmer painted by an unknown artist after Henry VIII's death. It was said that his beard signified his mourning of the King and his rejection of the old Church.

With the atmosphere in Cranmer's favour, he pursued quiet efforts to reform the Church, particularly the liturgy. On 27 May 1544, the first officially authorised vernacular service was published, the processional service of intercession known as the Exhortation and Litany. It survives today with minor modifications in the Book of Common Prayer. The traditional litany uses invocations to saints, but Cranmer thoroughly reformed this aspect by providing no opportunity in the text for such veneration. Additional reformers were elected to the House of Commons, and new legislation was introduced to curb the effects of the Act of the Six Articles and the Act for the Advancement of True Religion.

In 1546, the conservatives in a coalition including Gardiner, the Duke of Norfolk, the Lord Chancellor Wriothesley, and the bishop of London, Edmund Bonner, made one last attempt to challenge the reformers. Several reformers with links to Cranmer were targeted. Some, such as Lascelles, were burned at the stake. Powerful reform-minded nobles Edward Seymour and John Dudley returned to England from overseas and turned the tide against the conservatives. Two incidents tipped the balance. Gardiner was disgraced before the King when he refused to agree to exchange episcopal estates, and the son of the Duke of Norfolk was charged with treason and executed. There is no evidence that Cranmer played any part in these political games, and there were no further plots as the King's health ebbed in his final months. Cranmer performed his final duties for the King on 28 January 1547 when he gave a reformed statement of faith while gripping Henry's hand instead of giving him his last rites. Cranmer mourned Henry's death, and it was later said that he demonstrated his grief by growing a beard. The beard was also a sign of his break with the past. Continental reformers grew beards to mark their rejection of the old Church, and this significance of clerical beards was well understood in England. On 31 January, he was among the executors of the King's final will that nominated Edward Seymour as Lord Protector and welcomed the boy king, Edward VI.

== Foreign divines and reformed doctrines (1547–1549) ==
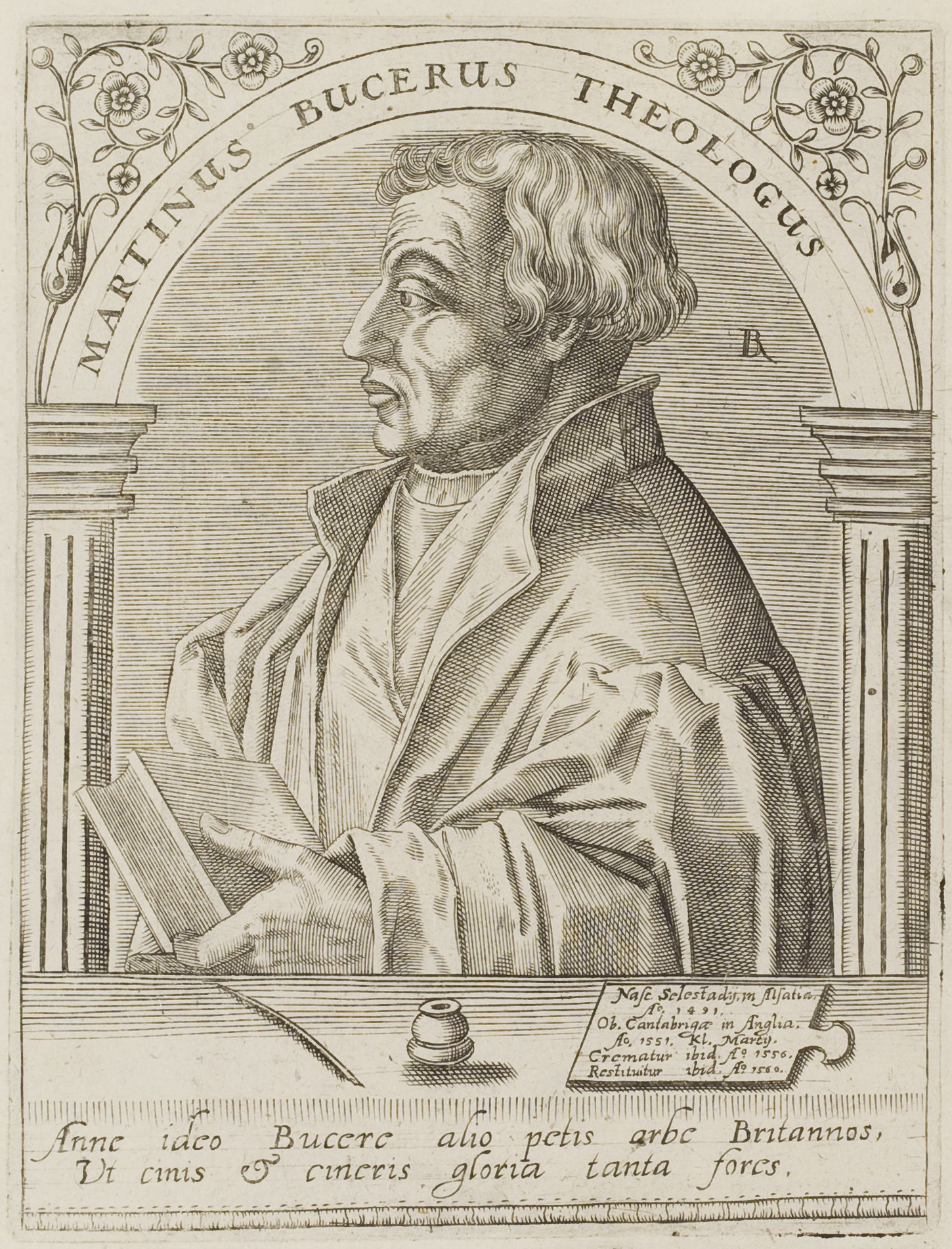
Martin Bucer, who had corresponded with Cranmer for many years, was forced to take refuge in England.

Under the regency of Seymour, the reformers became part of the establishment. A royal visitation of the provinces took place in August 1547, and each parish was instructed to obtain a copy of the Homilies. This book consisted of twelve homilies, four of which were written by Cranmer. His reassertion of the doctrine of justification by faith elicited a strong reaction from Gardiner. In the "Homily of Good Works annexed to Faith", Cranmer attacked monasticism and the importance of various personal actions involved in liturgical recitations and ceremonies. Hence, he narrowed the range of good works considered necessary and reinforced the importance of faith. In each parish visited, injunctions were put in place that resolved to "...eliminate any image which had any suspicion of devotion attached to it."

Cranmer's eucharistic views, which had already moved away from official Catholic doctrine, received another push from Continental reformers. Cranmer had been in contact with Martin Bucer since initial contacts were made with the Schmalkaldic League. Cranmer and Bucer's relationship became ever closer owing to Charles V's victory over the League at Mühlberg, which left England as the sole major nation that gave sanctuary to persecuted reformers. Cranmer wrote a letter to Bucer (now lost) with questions on eucharistic theology. In Bucer's reply dated 28 November 1547, he denied the human real presence and condemned transubstantiation and the adoration of the elements. The letter was delivered to Cranmer by two Italian reformed theologians, Peter Martyr and Bernardino Ochino, who were invited to take refuge in England. Martyr also brought with him an epistle written allegedly by John Chrysostom, Ad Caesarium Monachum, which appeared to provide patristic support against the corporeal real presence. These documents influenced Cranmer's thoughts on the Eucharist.

In March 1549, Strasbourg forced Martin Bucer and Paul Fagius to leave. Cranmer immediately invited the men to England and promised they would be placed in English universities. When they arrived on 25 April, Cranmer was delighted to meet Bucer face to face after eighteen years of correspondence. He needed these scholarly men to train a new generation of preachers as well as to assist in the reform of liturgy and doctrine. Others who accepted his invitations included the Polish reformer Jan Łaski, but Cranmer could not convince Osiander and Melanchthon that they should come to England.

== Book of Common Prayer (1548–1549) ==
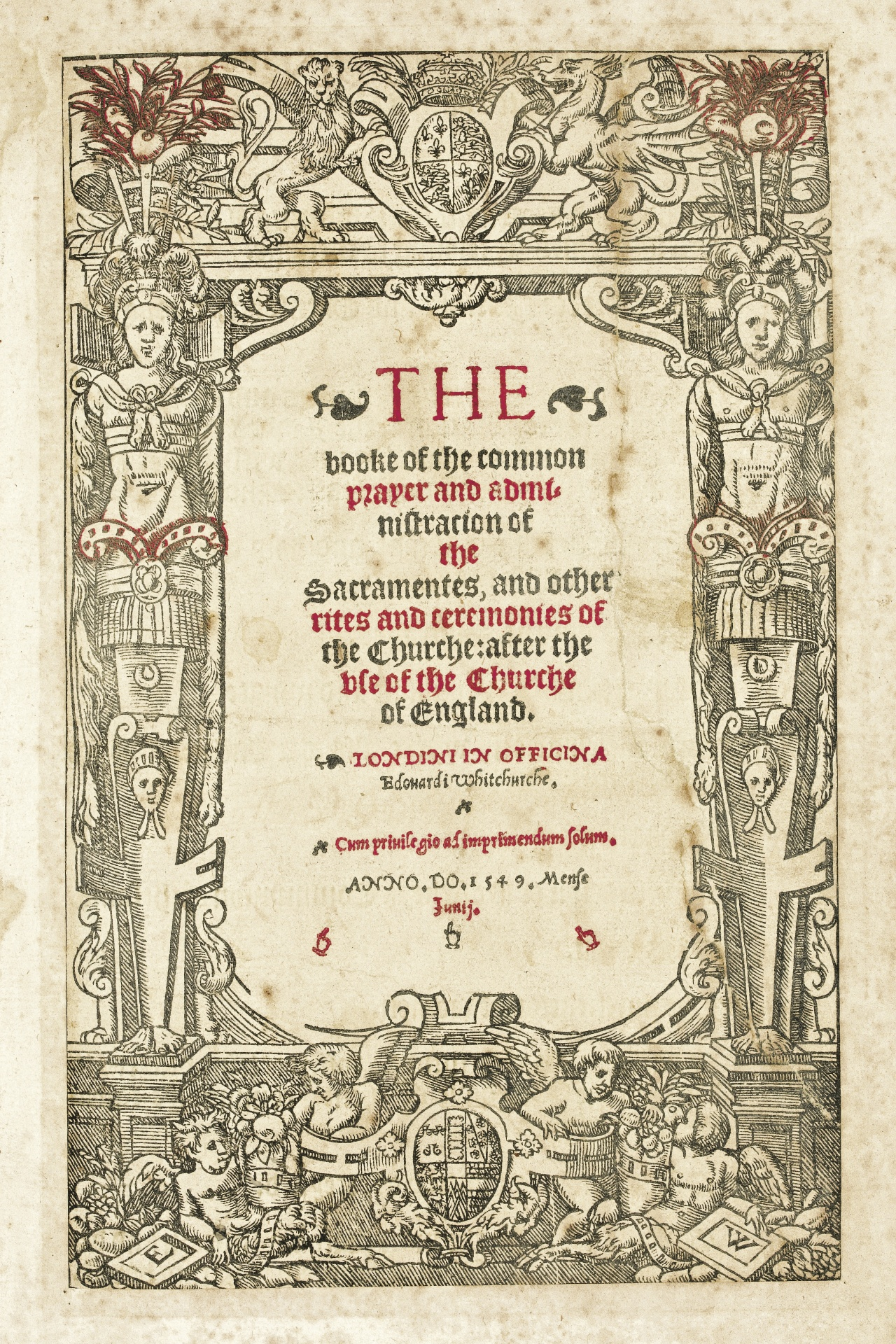
The title page of the 1549 Book of Common Prayer

As the use of English in worship services spread, the need for a complete uniform liturgy for the Church became evident. Initial meetings to start what would eventually become the 1549 Book of Common Prayer were held in the former Chertsey Abbey and in Windsor Castle in September 1548. The list of participants can be only partially reconstructed, but it is known that the members were balanced between conservatives and reformers. These meetings were followed by a debate on the Eucharist in the House of Lords which took place between 14 and 19 December. Cranmer publicly revealed in this debate that he had abandoned the doctrine of the corporeal real presence and believed that the Eucharistic presence was only spiritual. Parliament backed the publication of the prayer book after Christmas by passing the Act of Uniformity 1549; it then legalised clerical marriage.

It is difficult to ascertain how much of the prayer book is Cranmer's personal composition. Generations of liturgical scholars have been able to track down the sources that he used, including the Sarum Rite, writings from Hermann of Wied, and several Lutheran sources including Osiander and Justus Jonas. It is more problematic to determine how Cranmer worked on the book and with whom he worked. Where information about his possible helpers is lacking, he is given the credit for the editorship and the overall structure of the book.

The use of the new prayer book was made compulsory on 9 June 1549. This triggered a series of protests in Devon and Cornwall where the English language was not yet in common usage, now known as the Prayer Book Rebellion. By early July, the uprising had spread to other parts in the east of England. The rebels made a number of demands including the restoration of the Six Articles, the use of Latin for the mass with only the consecrated bread given to the laity, the restoration of prayers for souls in purgatory, and the rebuilding of abbeys. Cranmer wrote a strong response to these demands to the King in which he denounced the wickedness of the rebellion. On 21 July, Cranmer commandeered St Paul's Cathedral where he vigorously defended the official Church line. A draft of his sermon, the only extant written sample of his preaching from his entire career, shows that he collaborated with Peter Martyr on dealing with the rebellion.

== Consolidating gains (1549–1551) ==
The Prayer Book Rebellion and other events harmed the Seymour regency. The Privy Council became divided when several dissident Councillors joined behind John Dudley to oust Seymour. Cranmer and two other Councillors, William Paget, and Thomas Smith initially rallied behind Seymour. After a flurry of letters passed between the two sides, a bloodless coup d'état ended Seymour's Protectorship on 13 October 1549. Despite the support of religiously conservative politicians behind Dudley's coup, the reformers managed to maintain control of the new government, and the English Reformation continued to consolidate gains. Seymour was initially imprisoned in the Tower but was shortly released on 6 February 1550 and returned to the council. The Archbishop was able to transfer his former chaplain, Nicholas Ridley, from the minor see of Rochester to the diocese of London. At the same time, John Ponet took Ridley's former position. Incumbent conservatives were uprooted and replaced with reformers.

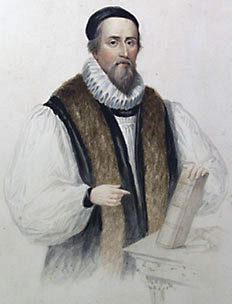
John Hooper was influenced by the Zwinglian Reformation and advocated more radical reforms. Portrait by Henry Bryan Hall, 1839.

The first result of cooperation and consultation between Cranmer and Bucer was the first Edwardine Ordinal, the liturgy for the ordination of priests. This was missing in the first prayer book and was not published until 1550. Cranmer adopted Bucer's draft and created three services for commissioning: a deacon, a priest, and a bishop. In the same year, Cranmer produced the Defence of the True and Catholic Doctrine of the Sacrament of the Body and Blood of Christ, a semi-official explanation of the eucharistic theology within the prayer book. It was the first full-length book with Cranmer's name on the title page. The preface summarises his quarrel with Rome in a well-known passage where he compared "beads, pardons, pilgrimages, and such other like popery" with weeds. Still, the roots of the weeds were transubstantiation, the corporeal real presence, and the sacrificial nature of the mass.

Although Bucer assisted in the development of the English Reformation, he was still quite concerned about the speed of its progress. Both Bucer and Fagius had noticed that the 1549 prayer book was not a remarkable step forward. However, Cranmer assured Bucer that it was only a first step and that its initial form was temporary. By late 1550, Bucer was becoming disillusioned. Cranmer ensured he did not feel alienated and kept in close touch with him. This attention paid off during the vestments controversy. This incident was initiated by John Hooper, a follower of Heinrich Bullinger who had recently returned from Zürich. Hooper was unhappy with Cranmer's prayer book and ordinal and particularly objected to using ceremonies and vestments. When the Privy Council selected him to be the Bishop of Gloucester on 15 May 1550, he laid down conditions for not wearing the required vestments. He found an ally among the Continental reformers in Jan Łaski, who had become a leader of the Stranger church in London, a designated place of worship for Continental Protestant refugees. His church's forms and practices had taken reforms much further than Cranmer would have liked. Bucer and Peter Martyr, while they sympathised with Hooper's position, supported Cranmer's arguments of timing and authority. Cranmer and Ridley stood their ground. This led to Hooper's imprisonment, and he eventually gave in. He was consecrated on 8 March 1551 according to the ordinal and preached before the King in his episcopal garments. Cranmer's vision of reform was maintained through careful steps under the government's authority.

== Final reform programme (1551–1553) ==
Cranmer's role in politics was diminishing when, on 16 October 1551, Seymour was arrested on charges of treason. In December, Seymour was put on trial, and although acquitted of treason, he was judged guilty of felony and was put to death on 22 January 1552. This began the breach between Cranmer and Dudley. It was aggravated during the year by the regency's gradual appropriation of ecclesiastical property. Throughout this political turmoil, Cranmer worked simultaneously on three major projects in his reform programme: the revision of canon law, the revision of the prayer book, and the formation of a statement of doctrine.

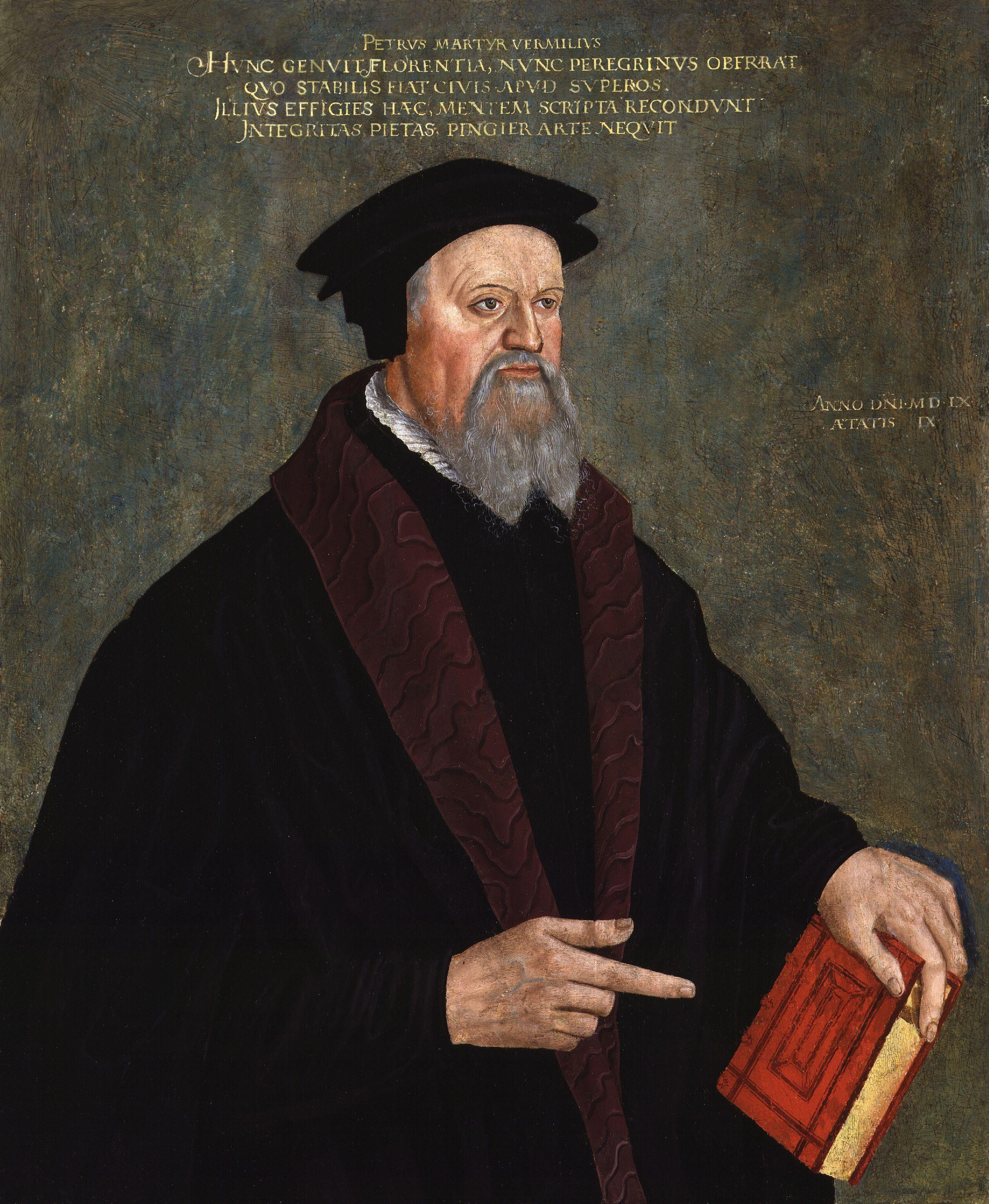
Peter Martyr (Pietro Martire Vermigli) greatly assisted Cranmer in the English Reformation. Portrait by Hans Asper, 1560.

The original Catholic canon law that defined governance within the Church needed revision following Henry's break with Rome. Several revision attempts were made throughout Henry's reign, but these initial projects were shelved as the speed of reform outpaced the time required to revise. As the reformation stabilised, Cranmer formed a committee in December 1551 to restart the work. He recruited Peter Martyr to the committee and he also asked Łaski and Hooper to participate, showing his habitual ability to forgive past actions. Cranmer and Martyr realised that a successful enactment of a reformed ecclesiastical law code in England would have international significance. Cranmer planned to draw together all the reformed churches of Europe under England's leadership to counter the Council of Trent, the Catholic Church's response to the Protestant Reformation. In March 1552, Cranmer invited the foremost Continental reformers, Bullinger, John Calvin, and Melanchthon, to come to England and to participate in an ecumenical council. The response was disappointing: Melanchthon did not respond, Bullinger stated that neither of them could leave Germany as it was riven by war between the Emperor and the Lutheran princes, and while Calvin showed some enthusiasm, he said he was unable to come. Cranmer acknowledged Calvin and replied, "Meanwhile, we will reform the English Church to the utmost of our ability and give our labour that both its doctrines and laws will be improved after the model of holy scripture." One partial manuscript of the project survived that was annotated with corrections and comments by Cranmer and Martyr. When the final version was presented to Parliament, the breach between Cranmer and Dudley was complete and the regent effectively killed the canon law bill in the House of Lords.

As with the first prayer book, the origins and participants in its revision are obscure, but it was clear that Cranmer led the project and steered its development. It had begun as early as the end of 1549 when the Convocation of Canterbury met to discuss the matter. Late in 1550, the opinions of Martyr and Bucer were sought on how the liturgy might be improved, and they influenced the revision significantly. The view of the spiritual presence was clarified by the use of entirely different words at the offering of the bread and the wine to the communicants. New rubrics noted that any bread could be used, and any bread or wine that remained could be used by the curate, thus dissociating the elements from any physical presence. The new book removed any possibility of prayers for the dead because such prayers implied support for the doctrine of purgatory. The Act of Uniformity 1552, which authorised the book's use, specified that it be exclusively used from 1 November. The final version was officially published at almost the last minute, owing to Dudley's intervention. While travelling in the north of the country, he met the Scots reformer John Knox, who was based in Newcastle. Impressed by his preaching, Dudley selected him as a royal chaplain and brought him south to participate in the reform projects. In a sermon before the King, Knox attacked the practice of kneeling during communion. On 27 September 1552, the Privy Council stopped the printing of the new prayer book and told Cranmer to revise it. He responded with a long letter arguing that it was for Parliament, with the royal assent, to decide any changes in the liturgy. On 22 October, the council decided to keep the liturgy as it was and to add the so-called Black Rubric, which explained that no adoration was intended when kneeling at communion.

The origins of the statement which eventually became the Forty-two Articles are equally obscure. As early as December 1549, the Archbishop demanded that his bishops subscribe to certain doctrinal articles. In 1551, Cranmer presented a version of a statement to the bishops, but its status remained ambiguous. Cranmer did not devote much effort to developing the articles, most likely owing to work on the canon law revision. He became more interested once the hope for an ecumenical council faded. By September 1552, draft versions of the articles were being worked on by Cranmer and John Cheke, his scholarly friend, commissioned to translate them into Latin. When the Forty-two Articles were published in May 1553, the title page declared that the Convocation agreed upon the articles, which were published by the king's authority. This was not the case and the mistake was likely caused by miscommunications between the Archbishop and the Privy Council. Cranmer complained about this to the council, but the authorities noted that the articles were developed during the Convocation (hence evading giving a direct answer). The council gave Cranmer the unhappy task of requiring the bishops to subscribe to the articles, many of whom opposed them and pointed out the anomaly of the title page. While Cranmer was carrying out this duty, events unfolded that rendered the subscriptions futile.

== Trials, recantations, execution (1553–1556) ==
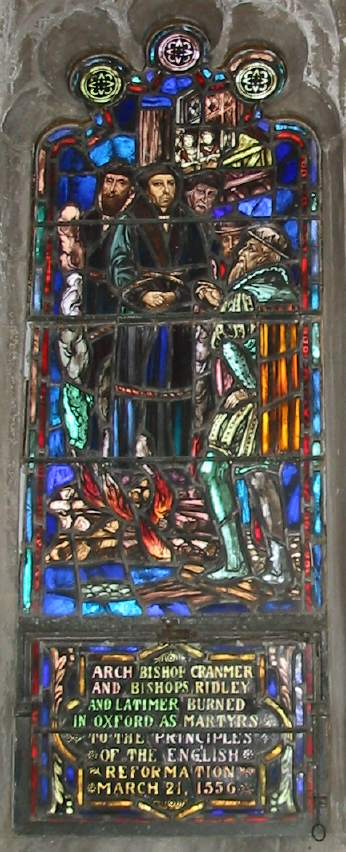
Stained glass window depicting Cranmer, Ridley, and Latimer, the Oxford Martyrs

Edward VI became seriously ill and the councillors were told that he did not have long to live. In May 1553, the council sent several letters to Continental reformers assuring them that Edward's health was improving. Among the letters was one addressed to Melanchthon inviting him to come to England to take up the Regius Chair in Cambridge which had been vacant since the death of Martin Bucer in February 1551. Both Henry VIII and Cranmer had previously failed to convince Melanchthon to come; this time, the council made a serious effort by sending him an advance to cover his travel expenses. Cranmer sent a personal letter urging him to take the offer. Despite his plea, Melanchthon never made the voyage to England. While this effort to shore up the reformation was taking place, the council was working to persuade several judges to put on the throne Lady Jane Grey, Edward's cousin and a Protestant, instead of Mary, a Catholic. On 17 June 1553, the King made his will, noting Jane would succeed him, contravening the Third Succession Act. Cranmer tried to speak to Edward alone, but he was refused and his audience with Edward occurred in the presence of the councillors. Edward told him that he supported what he had written in his will. Cranmer's decision to support Jane must have occurred before 19 June, when royal orders were sent to convene the Convocation for the recognition of the new succession.

By mid-July, there were serious provincial revolts in Mary's favour and support for Jane in the council fell. As Mary was proclaimed queen, Dudley, Ridley, Cheke, and Jane's father, the Duke of Suffolk, were imprisoned. No action was taken against the Archbishop. On 8 August, he led Edward's funeral according to the rites of the prayer book. During these months, he advised others, including Peter Martyr, to flee England, but he himself chose to stay. Reformed bishops were removed from office and conservative clergy, such as Edmund Bonner, had their old positions restored. Cranmer did not go down without a fight. When rumours spread that he authorised the use of the mass in Canterbury Cathedral, he declared them to be false and said, "All the doctrine and religion by our said sovereign lord king Edward VI is more pure and according to God's word than any that hath been used in England these thousand years." Not surprisingly, the government regarded Cranmer's declaration as tantamount to sedition. He was ordered to stand before the council in the Star Chamber on 14 September and on that day he said his final goodbye to Martyr. Cranmer was sent straight to the Tower to join Hugh Latimer and Nicholas Ridley.

On 13 November 1553, Cranmer and four others were brought to trial for high treason, found guilty, attainted by legislation passed by parliament (and so stripped of his see and right to make a will), and condemned to death. Numerous witnesses testified that Cranmer had encouraged heresy and had written heretical works, and he was charged with heresy. Through February 1554, Jane Grey and other rebels were executed, and attention then turned to the religious leaders of the reformation. On 8 March 1554, the Privy Council ordered Cranmer, Ridley, and Latimer to be transferred to Bocardo prison in Oxford to await a second trial for heresy. During this time, Cranmer was able to smuggle out a letter to Martyr, who had fled to Strasbourg, the last surviving document written in his own hand. He stated that the desperate situation of the church was proof that it would eventually be delivered. Cranmer remained isolated in Bocardo prison for seventeen months before the heresy trial started on 12 September 1555. Although it took place in England, the trial was under papal jurisdiction and the final verdict would come from Rome. Under interrogation, Cranmer admitted to every fact that was placed before him, but he denied any treachery, disobedience, or heresy. The trial of Latimer and Ridley started shortly after Cranmer's but their verdicts came almost immediately and they were burned at the stake on 16 October. Cranmer was taken to a tower to watch the proceedings. On 4 December, Rome decided Cranmer's fate by depriving him of the archbishopric and giving permission to the secular authorities to carry out their sentence.

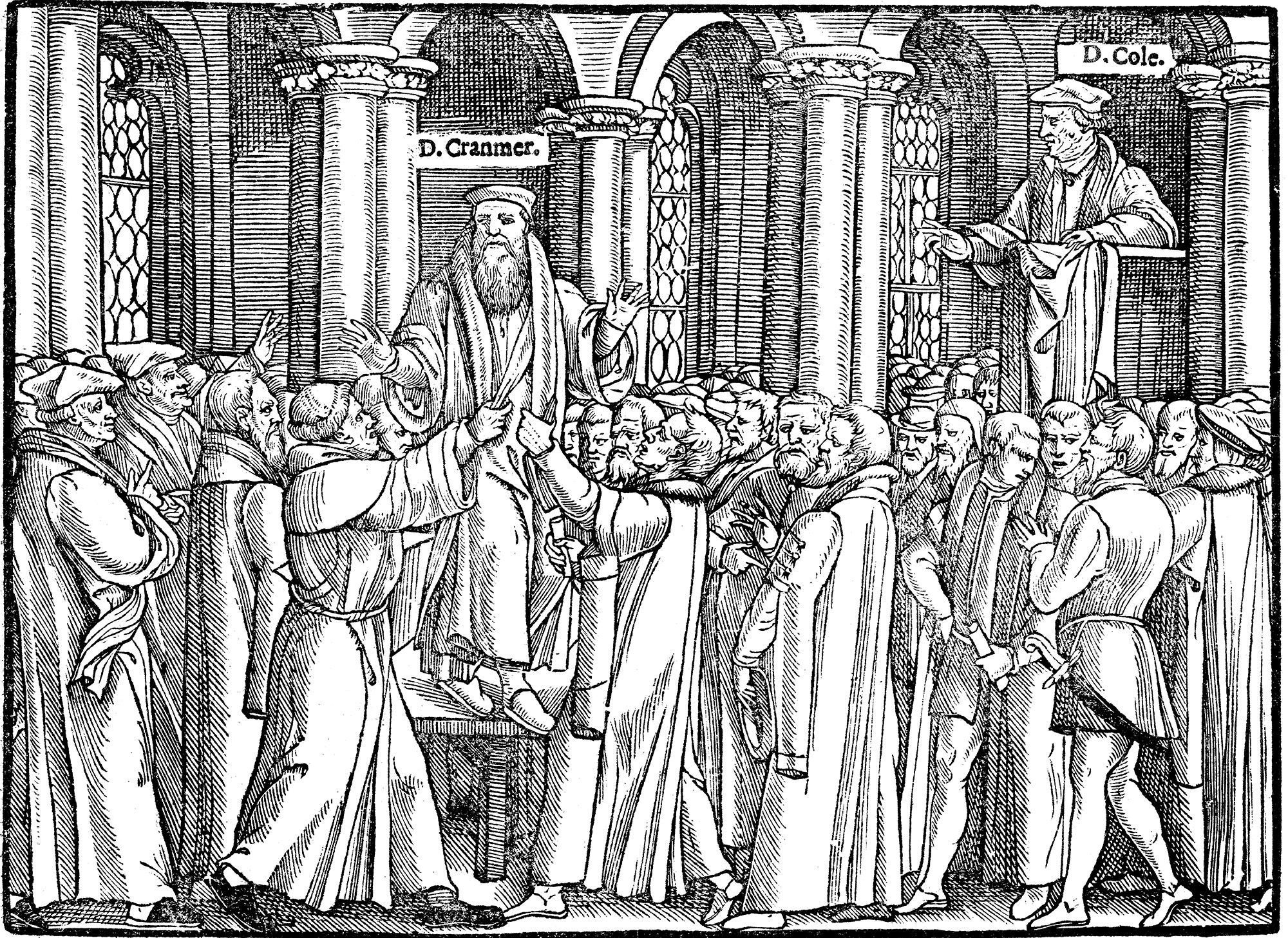
The Trial of Thomas Cranmer (1580)

In his final days, Cranmer's circumstances changed, which led to several recantations. On 11 December, he was taken out of Bocardo and placed in the house of the Dean of Christ Church. This new environment was very different from that of his two years in prison. He was in an academic community and treated as a guest. Approached by a Dominican friar, Juan de Villagarcía, he debated the issues of papal supremacy and purgatory. In his first four recantations, produced between the end of January and mid-February, Cranmer submitted himself to the authority of the king and queen and recognised the Pope as head of the Church. On 14 February 1556, he was degraded from holy orders and returned to Bocardo. He had conceded very little and Edmund Bonner was not satisfied with these admissions.

On 24 February, a writ was issued to the mayor of Oxford and the date of Cranmer's execution was set for 7 March. Two days after the writ was issued, a fifth statement, the first which could be called a true recantation, was issued. Cranmer repudiated all Lutheran and Zwinglian theology, fully accepted Catholic theology, including papal supremacy and transubstantiation, and stated that there was no salvation outside the Catholic Church. He announced his joy at returning to the Catholic faith, asked for and received sacramental absolution, and participated in the mass. Cranmer's burning was postponed and, under the normal practice of canon law, he should have been absolved. Mary, however, decided that no further postponement was possible. His last recantation was issued on 18 March. It was a sign of a broken man, a sweeping confession of sin. Despite the stipulation in canon law that recanting heretics be reprieved, Mary was determined to make an example of Cranmer. An ambassador summarised her position to her thus: Cranmer's "iniquity and obstinacy was so great against God and your Grace that your clemency and mercy could have no place with him, but you were constrained to administer justice". She pressed ahead with his execution required by his attainder by parliament for high treason.

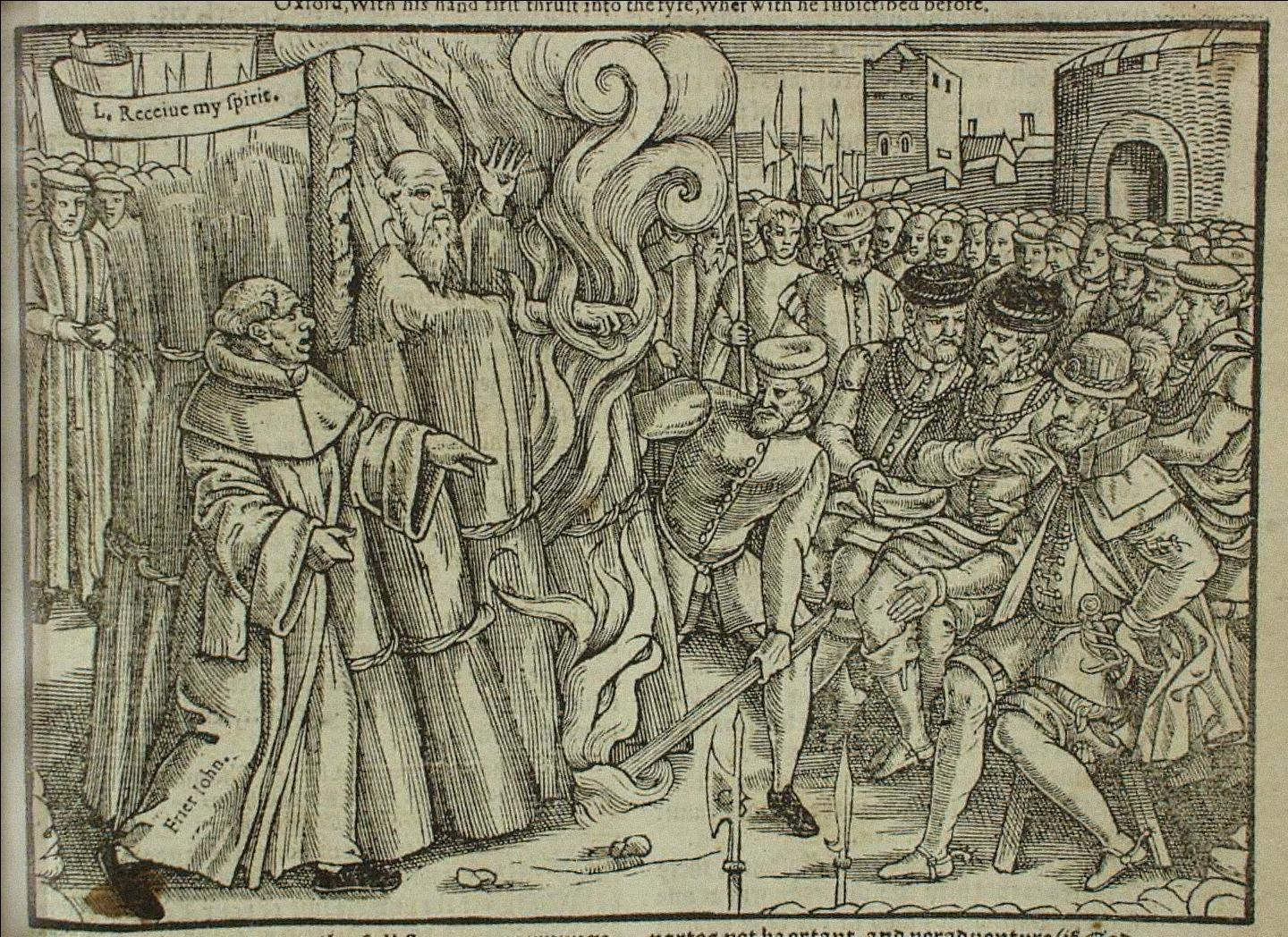
Cranmer's martyrdom, from Foxe's Book of Martyrs (1563)

Cranmer was told that he would be able to make a final recantation, but that this time it was to be in public during a service at the University Church in Oxford. He wrote and submitted the speech in advance and it was published after his death. At the pulpit on the day of his execution, 21 March 1556, he opened with a prayer and an exhortation to obey the King and Queen, but he ended his sermon totally unexpectedly, deviating from the prepared script. He renounced the recantations that he had written or signed with his own hand since his degradation and he stated that, in consequence, his hand would be punished by being burnt first. He then said, "And as for the Pope, I refuse him, as Christ's enemy, and Antichrist with all his false doctrine." He was pulled from the pulpit and taken to where Latimer and Ridley had been burnt six months previously. As the flames surrounded him, he fulfilled his promise by placing his right hand into the heart of the fire, calling it "that unworthy hand". His dying words were, "Lord Jesus, receive my spirit. I see the heavens open and Jesus standing at the right hand of God." These were also the last words of Saint Stephen, the first Christian martyr.

== Aftermath and legacy ==
The Marian government produced a pamphlet with all six recantations plus the text of the speech Cranmer was to have made in the University Church. His subsequent withdrawal of his recantations was not mentioned, though what actually happened soon became common knowledge, undermining the effectiveness of Marian propaganda. Similarly, the Protestant party had difficulty in making use of the event, given Cranmer's recantations. The exiles' propaganda concentrated on publishing various specimens of his writings. Eventually John Foxe put Cranmer's story to effective use in 1559, and it featured prominently in his Acts and Monuments when it was first printed in 1563.

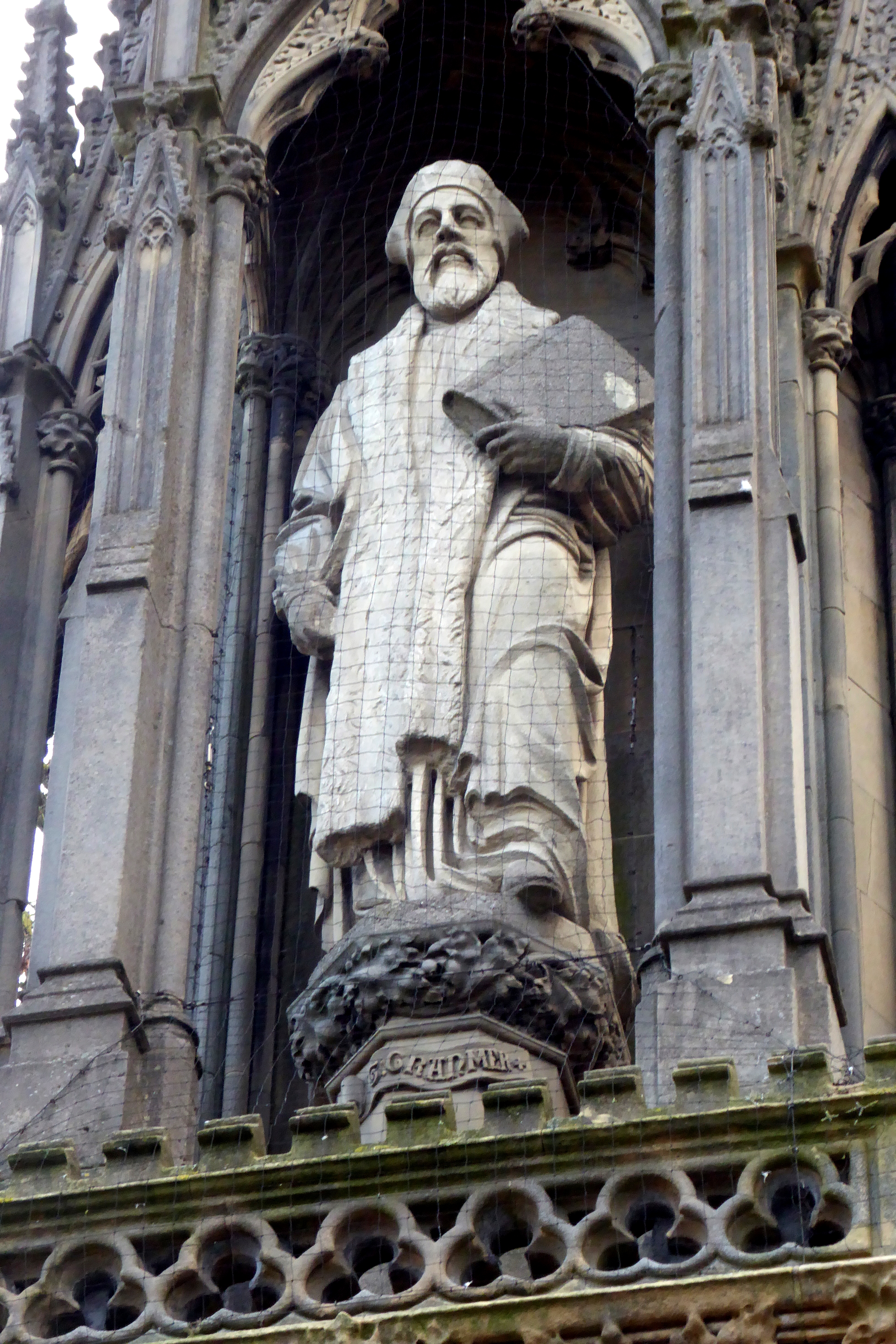
Statue of Cranmer on the Martyrs' Memorial, Oxford

Cranmer's family had been exiled to the Continent in 1539. It is not known exactly when they returned to England, but it was soon after the accession of Edward VI in 1547 that Cranmer publicly acknowledged their existence. Not much is known about the early years of the children. His daughter, Margaret, was likely born in the 1530s and his son, Thomas, came later, probably during the reign of Edward. Around the time of Mary's accession, Cranmer's wife, Margarete, escaped to Germany, while his son was entrusted to his brother, Edmund Cranmer, who took him to the Continent. Margarete Cranmer eventually married Cranmer's favourite publisher, Edward Whitchurch. The couple returned to England after Mary's reign and settled in Surrey. Whitchurch also negotiated for the marriage of Margaret to Thomas Norton. Whitchurch died in 1562 and Margarete married for the third time to Bartholomew Scott. She died in the 1570s. Both of Cranmer's children died without issue and his line became extinct.

When Elizabeth I came to power in 1558 she restored the Church of England's independence under the Elizabethan Religious Settlement. The church that she re-established represented, in effect, a snapshot of the Edwardine Church from September 1552. Thus the Elizabethan prayer book was basically Cranmer's 1552 edition but without the "Black Rubric". In the Convocation of 1563 the Forty-two Articles which were never adopted by the Church were altered in the area of eucharistic doctrine to form the Thirty-nine Articles. Most of the exiles returned to England and resumed their careers in the Church. To some like Edmund Grindal, an archbishop of Canterbury during Elizabeth's reign, Cranmer provided a shining example whose work should be upheld and extended.

Cranmer's greatest concerns were the maintenance of the royal supremacy and the diffusion of reformed theology and practice. Scholars note that he is best remembered for his contribution to the realms of language and of cultural identity. His prose helped to guide the development of the English language, and the Book of Common Prayer influenced many in the Anglophone world and has guided Anglican worship for four hundred years.

Catholic biographers sometimes depict Cranmer as an unprincipled opportunist, a Nicodemite, and a tool of royal tyranny. For their part, some Protestant biographers appear to overlook the ways or occasions in which Cranmer betrayed his own principles. Both sides can agree in seeing Cranmer as a committed scholar whose life showed the strengths and weaknesses of a very human and often under-appreciated reformer.

The Church of England commemorates Cranmer as a Reformation Martyr on 21 March, the anniversary of his death, and he is remembered in the calendar of saints with a lesser festival. The supposed site of the burnings is marked by a paving cross in Broad Street, Oxford, where an annual remembrance is held by the Prayer Book Society.

The United States Episcopal Church liturgical calendar honours him (together with Hugh Latimer and Nicholas Ridley) with a "day of optional observance" on 16 October.

== See also ==
- Attainder of Duke of Northumberland and others Act 1553
- List of Protestant martyrs of the English Reformation

Anglican Communion titles
Preceded by William Warham	Archbishop of Canterbury; 1533–56	Succeeded by Reginald Pole
