= Cranmer Hall, Lincolnshire =

Cranmer Hall was a manor in Lincolnshire in the sixteenth century.

It belonged to the family of Thomas Cranmer, archbishop of Canterbury.
