= Richard Grafton =

16th-century English printer and chronicler

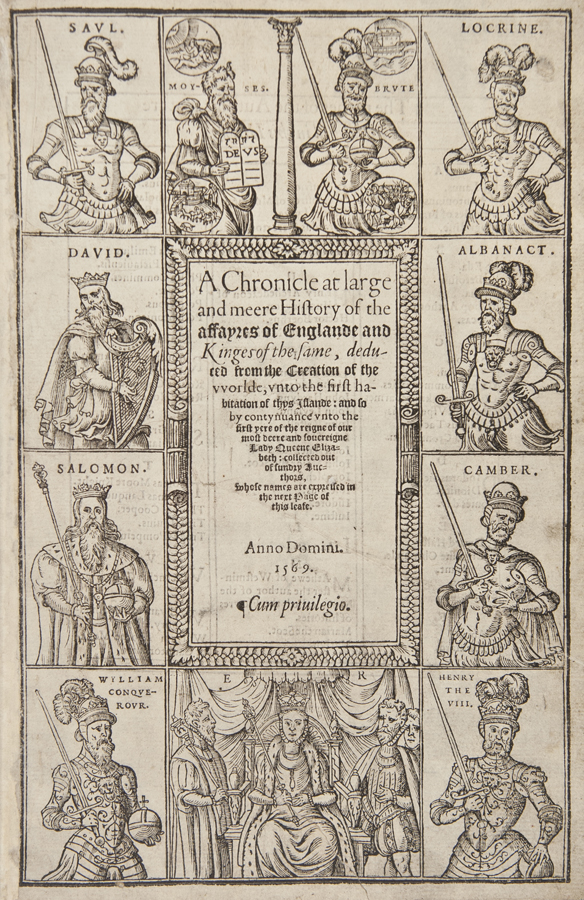
Title page of Grafton's Chronicle at Large (1568–9)

Richard Grafton (c. 1506/7 or 1511 – 1573) was King's Printer under Henry VIII and Edward VI. He was a member of the Grocers' Company and MP for Coventry elected 1562/63.

== Under Henry VIII ==
With Edward Whitchurch, a member of the Haberdashers' Company, Grafton was interested in the printing of the Bible in English, and eventually they became printers and publishers, more by chance than by design. They published the Matthew Bible in 1537, though it was printed abroad. In 1538 they brought presses and printers from Paris to print the first edition of the Great Bible.

Whitchurch printed for a time in partnership with Grafton, who set up his press in the recently surrendered house of the Grey Friars, and in 1541 they obtained a joint exclusive privilege for printing the Church of England's new liturgical books, including the first Book of Common Prayer and the Edwardine Ordinals. Later, they were granted a privilege for printing primers in Latin and English.

Also 1541 Grafton was committed to Fleet Prison for printing a "sedicious [sic] epistle of Melanctons" and was also accused by the Privy Council of printing ballads defending the late Thomas Cromwell. In April 1543, he and seven other printers, among them Whitchurch, were sent to prison "for printing such books as were thought to be unlawful". In Grafton's case it was for having printed the Great Bible. He spent six weeks in prison and was bound in £300 neither to sell nor to print any more Bibles until the King and clergy should agree upon a translation.

== Under Edward VI and later life ==
On the accession of Edward VI, Grafton was appointed King's Printer and this gave him the sole right to print all Acts and Statutes. In early 1553, shortly before the King's death, he published James Peele's The Maner and Fourme How to Kepe a Perfecte Reconyng, the earliest extant original work on bookkeeping in English. As a result, he is credited as having been responsible for the general introduction of the double-entry bookkeeping system — originally developed in Renaissance Italy — among English merchants.

He had held the appointment of King's Printer for six years, when on the King's death, he printed a proclamation of the accession of Lady Jane Grey, in which he signed himself "Printer to the Queen." For this he was cast into prison by Mary I. John Cawood became Queen's Printer, and Grafton's career as a printer ended.

In prison Grafton compiled an Abridgement of the Chronicles of England, which he published in 1563. It includes the first published English version of the verse "Thirty Days Hath September...", although manuscript versions have been found from the 15th century. To this he added in 1568–9 A Chronicle at Large. Neither holds a high place as authorities, as they lack original material. John Stow and Grafton had a running battle over their rival chronicles after Stow justifiably accused Grafton of copying his own work. In the Chronicle at Large, he is the earliest writer known to refer in print to Edward of Woodstock (Prince of Wales, Duke of Cornwall, Prince of Aquitaine) as the "Black Prince". The origins of the name remain uncertain: Grafton said he had found it in other writers, and gives no further explanation.

Grafton was instrumental in the establishment and maintenance of the London hospitals. He died in 1573, probably in late April or early May, and was buried on 14 May in Christ Church Greyfriars in London, leaving four sons and one daughter, Joan, who married the printer Richard Tottel. Grafton's device was a tree bearing grafts issuing from a tun or barrel of the kind in which books were packed for transport – hence "graft-tun", an example of a rebus.

== See also ==
- Robert Crowley
- Edward Whitchurch
- Miles Coverdale
- William Tyndale
