= Works of Erasmus =

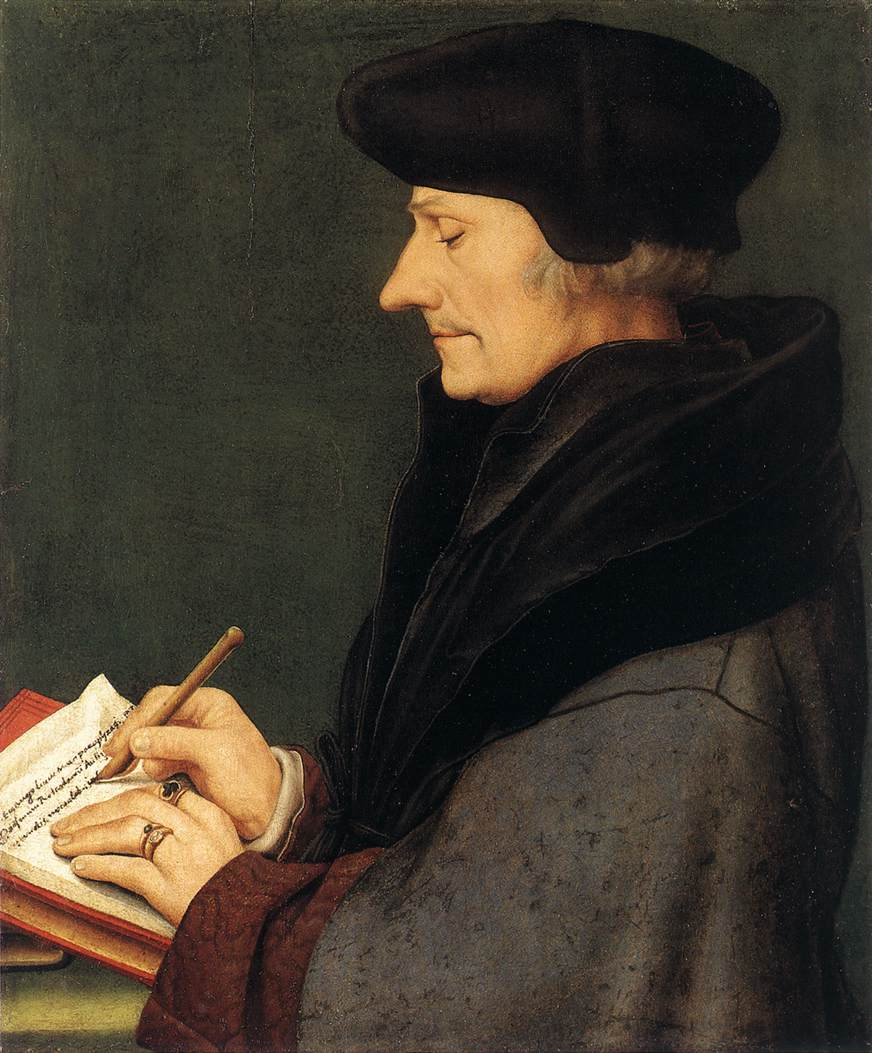
Erasmus by Holbein

Desiderius Erasmus was the most popular, most printed and arguably most influential author of the early sixteenth century, read in all nations in the West and frequently translated. By the 1530s, the writings of Erasmus accounted for 10 to 20 percent of all book sales in Europe. "Undoubtedly he was the most read author of his age."

His vast number of Latin and Greek publications included translations, paraphrases, letters, textbooks, plays for schoolboys, commentary, poems, liturgies, satires, sermons, and prayers. He is noted for his extensive scholarly editions of the New Testament and the complete works of numerous Church Fathers. A large number of his later works were defences of his earlier work from attacks by Catholic and Protestant theological and literary opponents.

His work was at the forefront of the contemporary Catholic Reformation and advocated a spiritual reform program he called the "philosophia Christi" and a theological reform agenda he called the Method of True Theology. It provided much of the material that spurred the Protestant Reformation, the Anglican Reformation and the Counter-Reformation; the influence of his ideas continues to the present.

Following the Council of Trent, which endorsed many of his themes, such as his theology on Free Will, many of his works were at times banned or required to be expurgated under various Catholic regional Indexes of prohibited books, and issued anonymously or bastardized with sectarian changes in Protestant countries. Many of his pioneering scholarly editions were superseded by newer revisions or re-brandings, and the popularity of his writings waned as pan-European Latin-using scholarship gave way to vernacular scholarship and readership.

== Notable writings ==
Erasmus wrote for both educated audiences on subjects of humanist interest and "to Christians in the various stages of lives:...for the young, for married couples, for widows," the dying, clergy, theologians, religious, princes, partakers of sacraments, etc.

According to historial Erika Rummel "Three areas preoccupied Erasmus as a writer: language arts, education, and biblical studies. ...All of his works served as models of style. ...He pioneered the principles of textual criticism."

He usually wrote books in particular classical literary genres with their different rhetorical conventions: complaint, diatribe, dialogue, encomium, epistle, commentary, liturgy, sermon, etc. His letter to Ulrich von Hutten on Thomas More's household has been called "the first real biography in the real modern sense."

The only works with enduring popularity in modern time are his satires and semi-satires: The Praise of Folly, Julius Excluded from Heaven and The Complaint of Peace. However, his other works, such as his several thousand letters, continue to be a vital source of information to historians of numerous disciplines.

=== Adages (1500-1520) ===
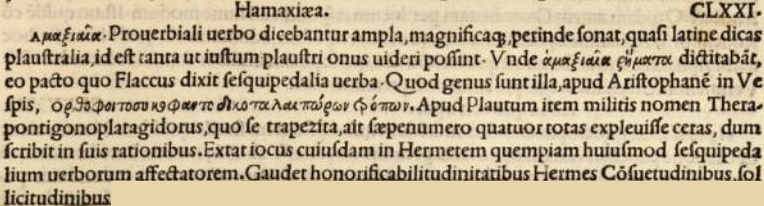
Entry in Adagia mentioning honorificabilitudinitatibus

Erasmus found early publishing success with his collections of sayings the Adagia (Adages) and the Apophthegmata. (Note: "No humanist inhabited, cultivated, and chased after ancient proverbs with as much passion as Desiderius Erasmus."Hui, Andrew (2018). "The Infinite Aphorisms of Erasmus and Bacon". Erasmus Studies. 38 (2): 171–199. doi:10.1163/18749275-03802003. ISSN 0276-2854. S2CID 172124407.)

With the collaboration of Publio Fausto Andrelini, he made a collection of Latin proverbs and adages, commonly known as the Adagia. It includes the adage "In the land of the blind, the one-eyed man is king." He coined the adage "Pandora's box", arising through an error in his translation of Hesiod's Pandora in which he confused pithos (storage jar) with pyxis (box).

Examples of Adages are:

- more haste, less speed.
- a dung beetle hunting an eagle.
- In the country of the blind, the one-eyed man is king.
- The most disadvantageous peace is better than the justest war.
- Bidden or unbidden, God is always there.

Erasmus is also blamed for the mistranslation from Greek of "to call a bowl a bowl" as "to call a spade a spade", and the rendering of Pandora's "jar" as "box".

Erasmus later spent nine months in Venice at the Aldine Press expanding the Adagia to over three thousand entries; in the course of 27 editions, it expanded to over four thousand entries in Basel at the Froben press. It "introduced a fairly wide audience to the actual words and thoughts of the ancients."

An English version was selected and translated by Richard Taverner.

=== Handbook of the Christian Knight (1501) ===
Erasmus's more serious writings begin early with the Enchiridion militis Christiani, the "Handbook of the Christian Knight" (1501 and re-issued in 1518 with an expanded preface—translated into English in 1533 by the young William Tyndale). (A more literal translation of enchiridion—"dagger"—has been likened to "the spiritual equivalent of the modern Swiss Army knife.") In this short work, Erasmus outlines the views of the normal Christian life, which he was to spend the rest of his days elaborating.

He has been described as "evangelical in his beliefs and pietistic in his practise." (Note: "Erasmus is so thoroughly, radically Christ-centered in his understanding of both Christian faith and practice that if we overlook or downplay this key aspect of his character and vision, we not only do him a grave disservice but we almost completely misunderstand him." Markos, Louis A. (April 2007). "The Enchiridion of Erasmus". Theology Today. 64 (1): 80–88. doi:10.1177/004057360706400109. S2CID 171469828.)

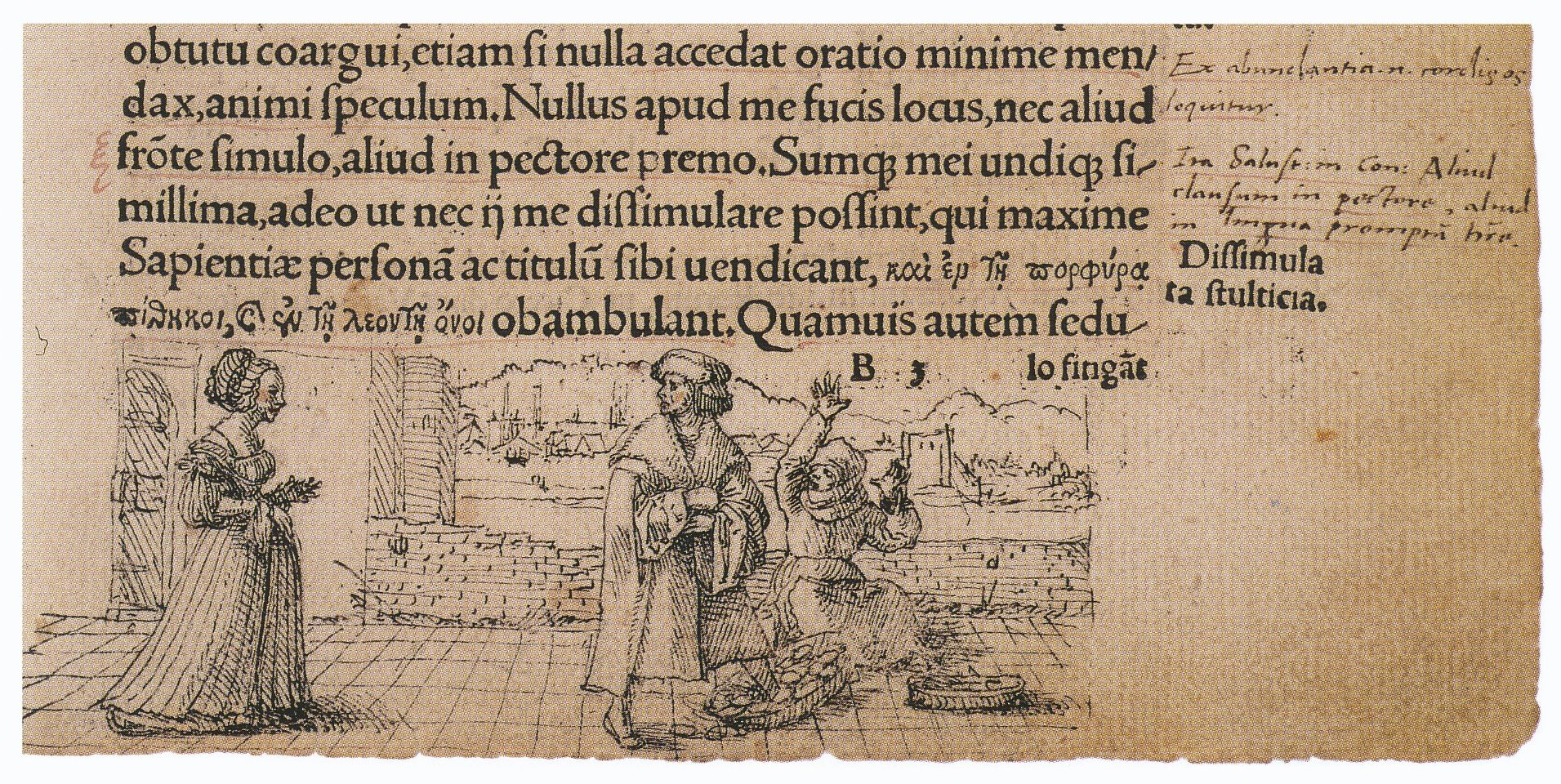
A Scholar Treads on a Market Woman's Basket of Eggs, marginal drawing by Hans Holbein the Younger in The Praise of Folly: Erasmus is foolishly distracted by a woman.

=== The Praise of Folly (1511) ===
Erasmus's best-known work is The Praise of Folly, written in 1509, published in 1511 under the double title Moriae encomium (Greek, Latinised) and Laus stultitiae (Latin). It is inspired by De triumpho stultitiae written by Italian humanist Faustino Perisauli. A satirical attack on superstitions and other traditions of European society in general and in the Western Church in particular, it was dedicated to Sir Thomas More, whose name the title puns.

=== De copia (1512) ===
De Copia (or Foundations of the Abundant Style or On Copiousness) is a textbook designed to teach aspects of classical rhetoric: having a large supply of words, phrases and grammatical forms is a gateway to formulating and expressing thoughts, especially for "forensic oratory", with mastery and freshness. Perhaps as a joke, its full title is "The twofold copia of words and arguments in a double commentary" (Latin: De duplici copia verborum ac rerum commentarii duo). It was "the most often printed rhetoric textbook written in the renaissance, with 168 editions between 1512 and 1580."

The first part of the book is about verborum (words). It famously includes 147 variations on "Your letter pleased me very much", and 203 bravura variations on "Always, as long as I live, I shall remember you." (Note: These eulogize Thomas More (25 by name), such as: "More is inscribed in my heart in letters that no injurious time can erode.")

The second part of the book is about rerum (arguments) to learn critical thinking and advocacy. Erasmus advised students to practice the rhetorical techniques of copiousness by writing letters to each other arguing both side of an issue (Latin: in utramque parte).

=== Opuscula plutarchi (1514), and Apophthegmatum opus (1531) ===
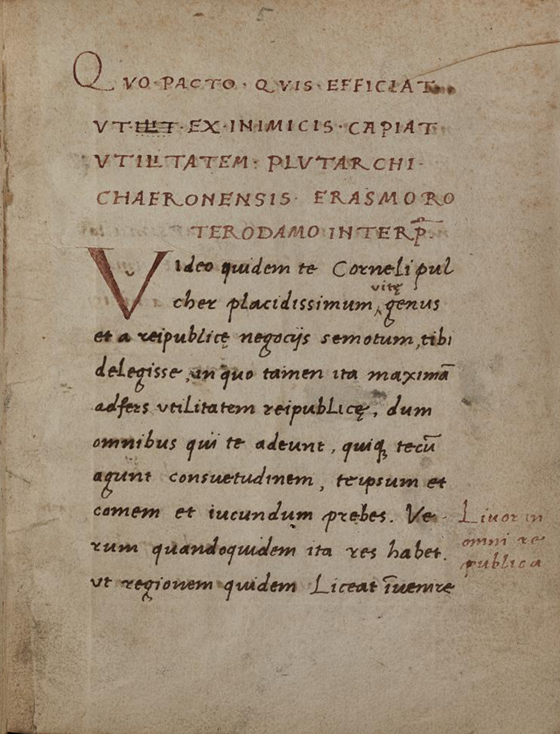
Handwriting of Erasmus of Rotterdam: Plutarch's How to profit from one's enemies

In a similar vein to the Adages was his translation of Plutarch's Moralia: parts were published from 1512 onwards and collected as the Opuscula plutarchi (c1514).

This was the basis of 1531's Apophthegmatum opus (Apophthegms), which ultimately contained over 3,000 aphophthegms: "certainly the fullest and most influential Renaissance collection of Cynic sayings and anecdotes", particular of Diogenes (from Diogenes Laertius.)

One of these was published independently, as How to tell a Flatterer from a Friend, dedicated to England's Henry VIII.

=== Julius exclusus e coelis (1514) attrib. ===
Julius excluded from Heaven is a biting satire usually attributed to Erasmus perhaps for private circulation, though he publicly denied writing it, calling its author a fool. The recently deceased Pope Julius arrives at the gates of heaven in his armour with his dead army, demanding from St Peter to be let in based on his glory and exploits. St Peter turns him away.

=== Sileni Alcibiadis (1515) ===
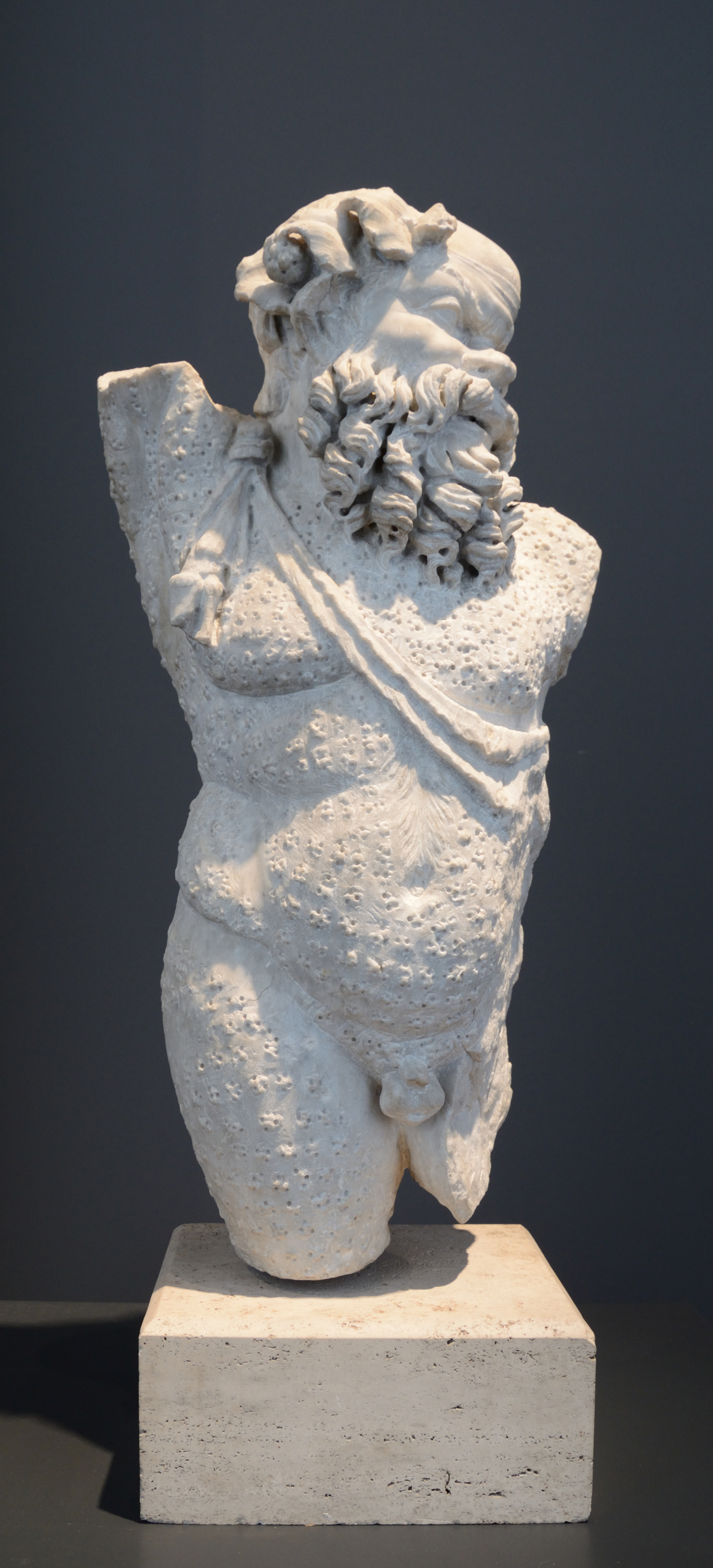
Statue of Silenus in Palazzo Massimo alle Terme

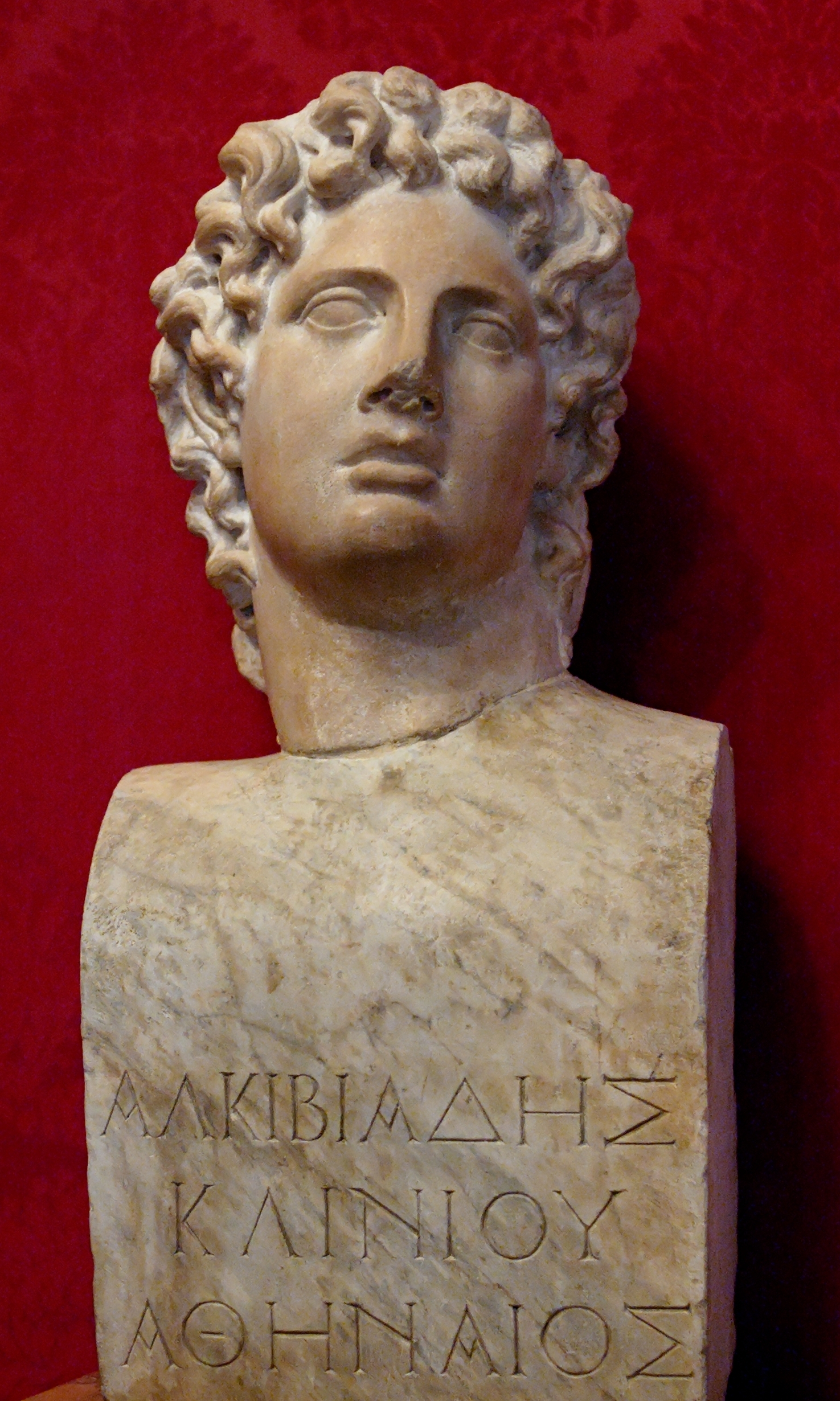
Hern of Alcibiades, Musei Capitolini

Erasmus's Sileni Alcibiadis is one of his most direct assessments of the need for Church reform. It started as a small entry in the 1508 Adagia citing Plato's Symposium and expanded to several hundred sentences. Johann Froben published it first within a revised edition of the Adagia in 1515, then as a stand-alone work in 1517.

Sileni is the plural (Latin) form of Silenus, a creature often related to the Roman wine god Bacchus and represented in pictorial art as inebriated, merry revellers, variously mounted on donkeys, singing, dancing, playing flutes, etc. In particular, the Sileni that Erasmus referred to were small, coarse, hollow, ugly or distasteful carved figures which opened up to reveal a beautiful deity or valuables inside, in particular tiny gold statues of gods.

Alcibiades was a Greek politician in the 5th century BCE and a general in the Peloponnesian War; he figures here more as a character written into some of Plato's dialogues – an externally-attractive, young, debauched playboy whom Socrates tries to convince to seek truth instead of pleasure, wisdom instead of pomp and splendor.

The term Sileni – especially when juxtaposed with the character of Alcibiades – can therefore be understood as an evocation of the notion that something on the inside is more expressive of a person's character than what one sees on the outside. For instance, something or someone ugly on the outside can be beautiful on the inside, which is one of the main points of Plato's dialogues featuring Alcibiades and in the Symposium, in which Alcibiades also appears. (Note: "Anyone who looks closely at the inward nature and essence will find that nobody is further from true wisdom than those people with their grand titles, learned bonnets, splendid sashes and bejeweled rings, who profess to be wisdom's peak." Sileni Alcibiadis)

On the other hand, Erasmus lists several Sileni and then controversially questions whether Christ is the most noticeable Silenus of them all. The Apostles were Sileni since they were ridiculed by others. The scriptures are a Silenus too.

The work then launches into a biting endorsement of the need for high church officials (especially the Pope) to follow the evangelical counsel of poverty (simplicity): this condemnation of wealth and power was a full two years before the notional start of the Reformation; the church must be able to act as a moderating influence on the ambition and selfishness of princes. (Note: Philologist Lucca Baratta summarized Erasmus' arguments as follows: "The ignorance and poor judgement of the people, surreptitiously encouraged by the powerful, are the foundations of bad government. The king therefore needs a true counsellor, who will guide his choices rather than flatter him; so it is essential to unmask the deception of those who brand as heretics whomever seeks to bring the Church back to the road (of poverty and virtue) trodden by Christ. Only thus can abuse of the temporal and spiritual power be avoided. //It is therefore essential to recapture the original purity of the Christian message, and to follow the clear division of the roles of power, without undue mingling of the worldly and the celestial: the infidelity to Christ of the men of the Church produces only the bloated and grotesque figures of power oblivious to its own spiritual ends. There can be only one solution: the men of the Church must despise earthly goods." Baratta, Luca (1 September 2022). "'A Scorneful Image of this Present World': Translating and Mistranslating Erasmus's Words in Henrician England". Critical Survey. 34 (3): 100–122. doi:10.3167/cs.2022.340307. S2CID 250649340. p. 105)

=== The Education of a Christian Prince (1516) ===
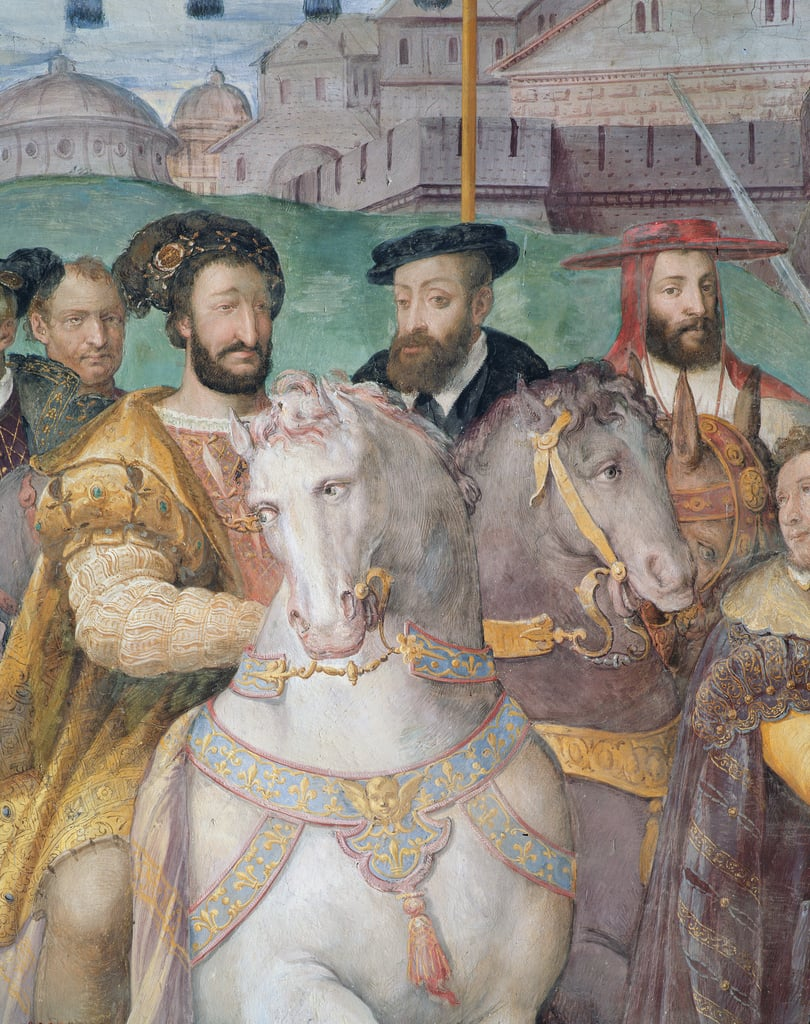
Entry of Francis of France, Emperor Charles V, and Cardinal Farnese (later Pope Paul III) into Paris - 1540 (detail)

The Institutio principis Christiani or "Education of a Christian Prince" (Basel, 1516) was written as advice to the young king Charles of Spain (later Charles V, Holy Roman Emperor), to whom the Preface is addressed. Erasmus applies the general principles of honor and sincerity to the special functions of the Prince, whom he represents throughout as the servant of the people.

=== Latin and Greek New Testaments ===
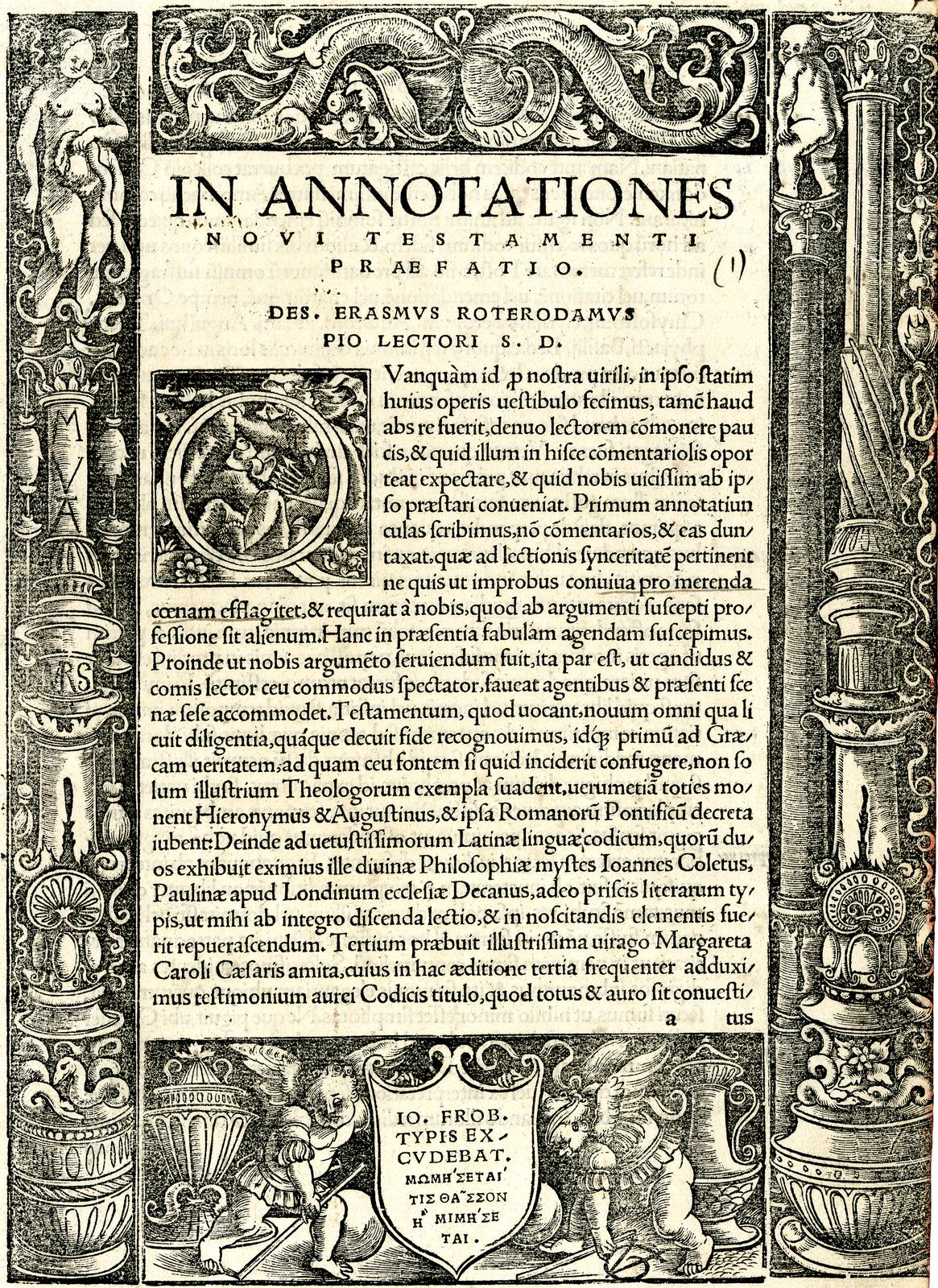
First page of Preface, Annotations of the New Testament (1521), with characteristic Froben decoration

Erasmus produced this first edition of his corrected Latin and Greek New Testament in 1516, in Basel at the print of Johann Froben, and took it through multiple revisions and editions. Up to 300,000 copies of the various editions appear to have been printed in Erasmus' lifetime. This body of work formed the basis for the majority of Textus Receptus translations of the New Testament in the 16th–19th centuries, including those of Martin Luther, William Tyndale and the King James Version.

For Erasmus, knowledge of the original language was not enough: theologian Gregory Graybill notes "the faithful exegete had to master not only the original tongues, but also the crucial disciplines of grammar and rhetoric." (Note: "Further, because the Scriptures in their original languages were so important, the faithful exegete had to master not only the original tongues, but also the crucial disciplines of grammar and rhetoric[...] For Erasmus, rhetoric and grammar, were, in fact, more important subjects than the logic of the schoolmen.") Consequently, an integral and motivating part of the work was the substantial philological annotations. Erasmus independently brought out Paraphrases of the books of the New Testament, suited for a less academic readership.

Erasmus had, for his time, relatively little interest in the Old Testament, apart from the Psalms. (Note: "If only the Christian church did not attach so much importance to the Old Testament!" Ep 798 p. 305, For Erasmus, "...the relative importance we should ascribe to the different books of the Bible," accorded to how much "they bring us more or less directly to knowledge of (Christ)": which gave priority to the New Testament and the Gospels in particular. "To Erasmus, Judaism was obsolete. To Reuchlin, something of Judaism remained of continuing value to Christianity.") Similarly, he was relatively uninterested in the Book of Revelation, which he did not produce a paraphrase for, and he provocatively reported the doubts in the early Greek church about its status in the canon: Erasmus had none of the apocalypticism of his times which so animated Savonarolan and Protestant rhetoric: only one percent of his Annotations on the New Testament concerned the Book of Revelation.

==== New Latin translation ====
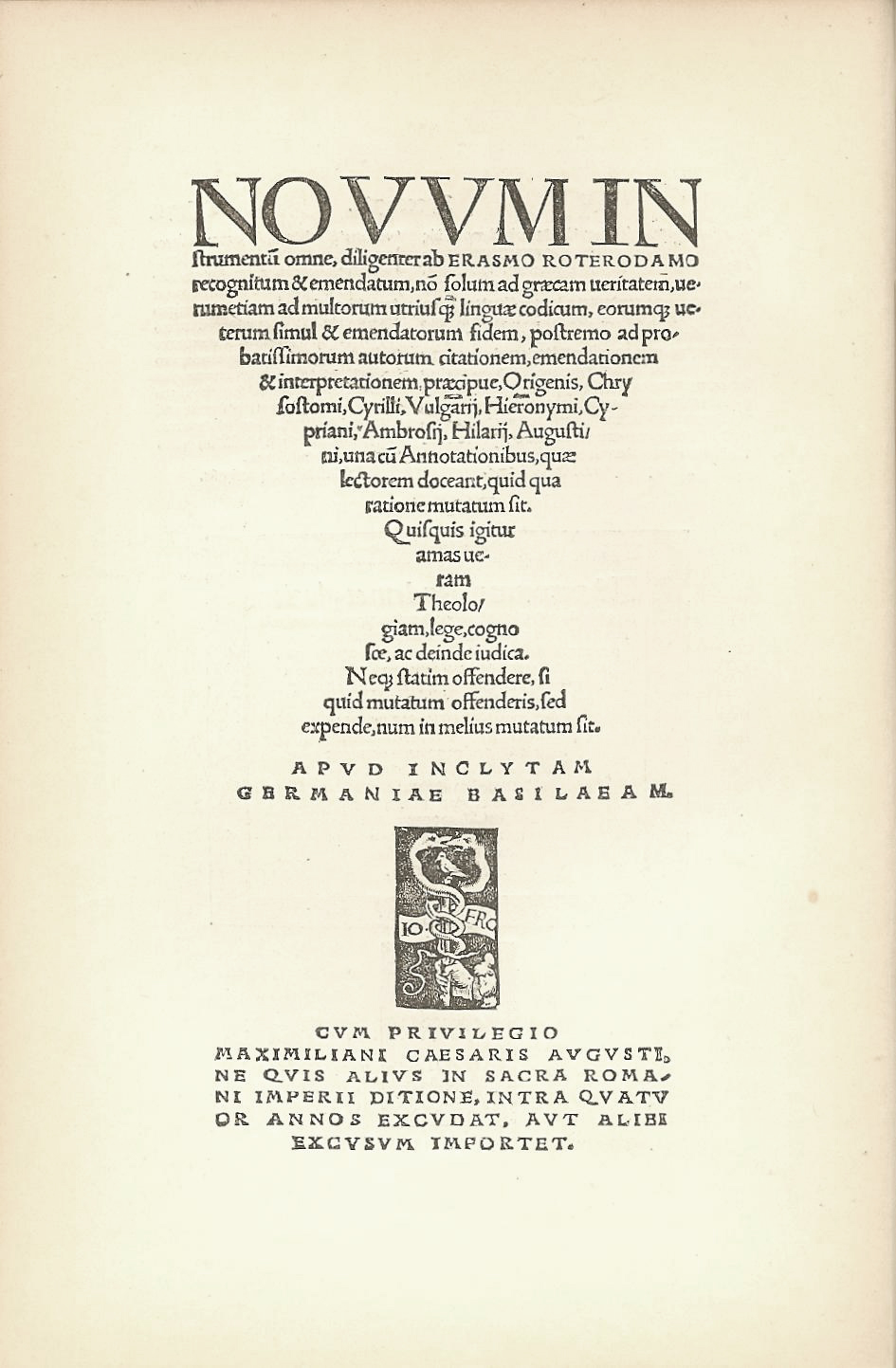
Title page of Erasmus' Novum instrumentum omne

Erasmus had been working for years on two related projects to help theologians: philological notes on the Latin and Greek texts (Note: "My mind is so excited at the thought of emending Jerome's text, with notes, that I seem to myself inspired by some god. I have already almost finished emending him by collating a large number of ancient manuscripts, and this I am doing at enormous personal expense. Epistle 273") and a fresh Latin New Testament. He examined all the Latin versions he could find to create a critical text. Then he polished the language. He declared, "It is only fair that Paul should address the Romans in somewhat better Latin." In the earlier phases of the project, he never mentioned a Greek text.

While his intentions for publishing a fresh Latin translation are clear, (Note: "He welcomed vernacular translations with great enthusiasm, but they could mean nothing for Europe as a whole. ... Latin was...the only language in which the Bible could play a role in the culture of Europe."de Jong, Henk Jan (1984). "Novum Testamentum a nobis versum: the Essence of Erasmus' Edition of the New Testament". The Journal of Theological Studies. 32 (2).) it is less clear why he included the Greek text. Though some speculate that he long intended to produce a critical Greek text or that he wanted to beat the Complutensian Polyglot into print, there is no evidence to support this. He wrote, "There remains the New Testament translated by me, with the Greek facing, and notes on it by me." He further demonstrated the reason for the inclusion of the Greek text when defending his work:

But one thing the facts cry out, and it can be clear, as they say, even to a blind man, that often through the translator's clumsiness or inattention the Greek has been wrongly rendered; often the true and genuine reading has been corrupted by ignorant scribes, which we see happen every day, or altered by scribes who are half-taught and half-asleep.

— Epistle 337

So he included the Greek text to permit qualified readers to verify the quality of his Latin version. But by first calling the final product Novum Instrumentum omne ("All of the New Teaching") and later Novum Testamentum omne ("All of the New Testament") he also indicated clearly that he considered a text in which the Greek and the Latin versions were consistently comparable to be the essential core of the church's New Testament tradition.

==== Publication and editions ====
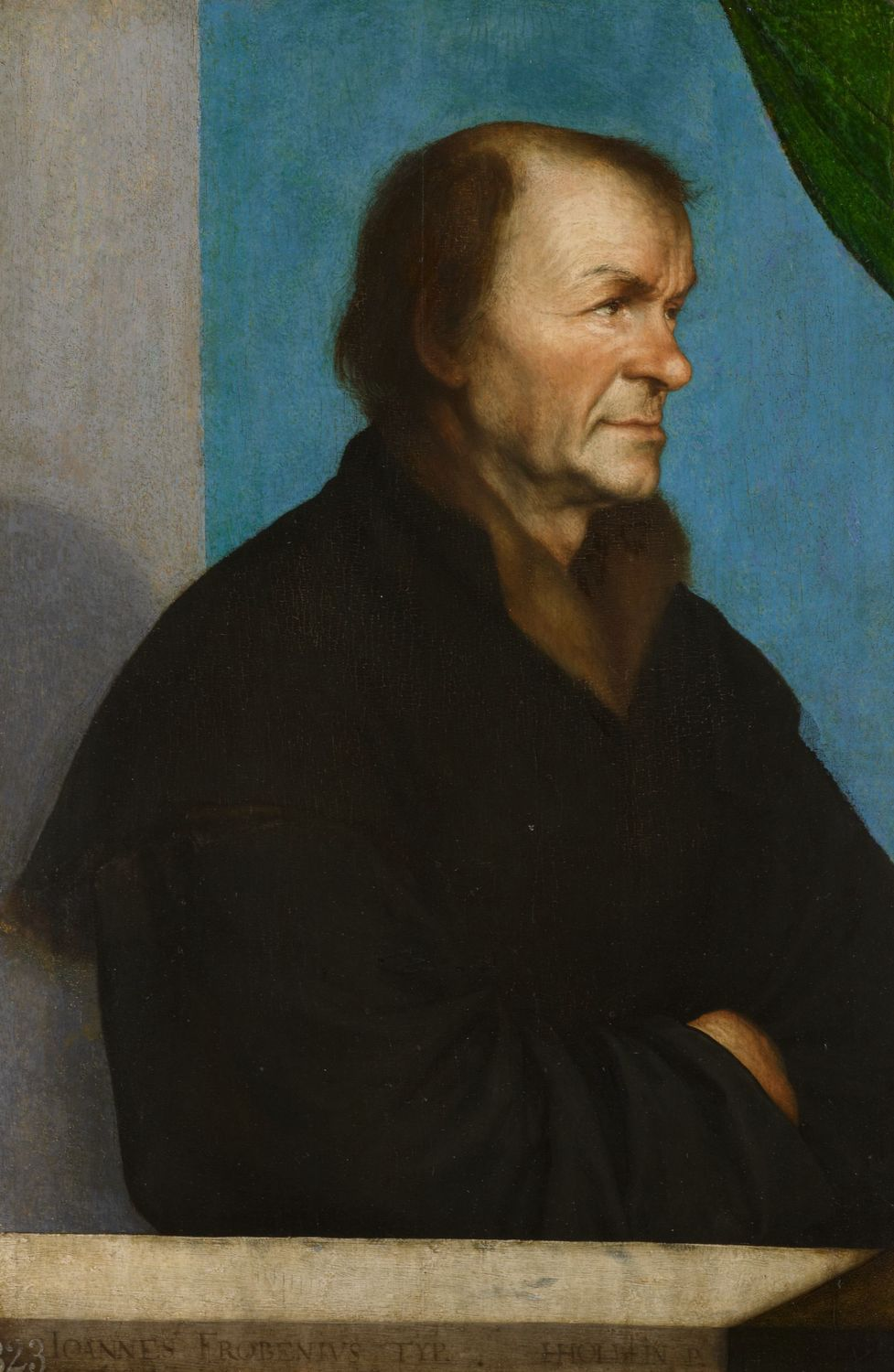
Portrait of Johannes Froben by Holbein

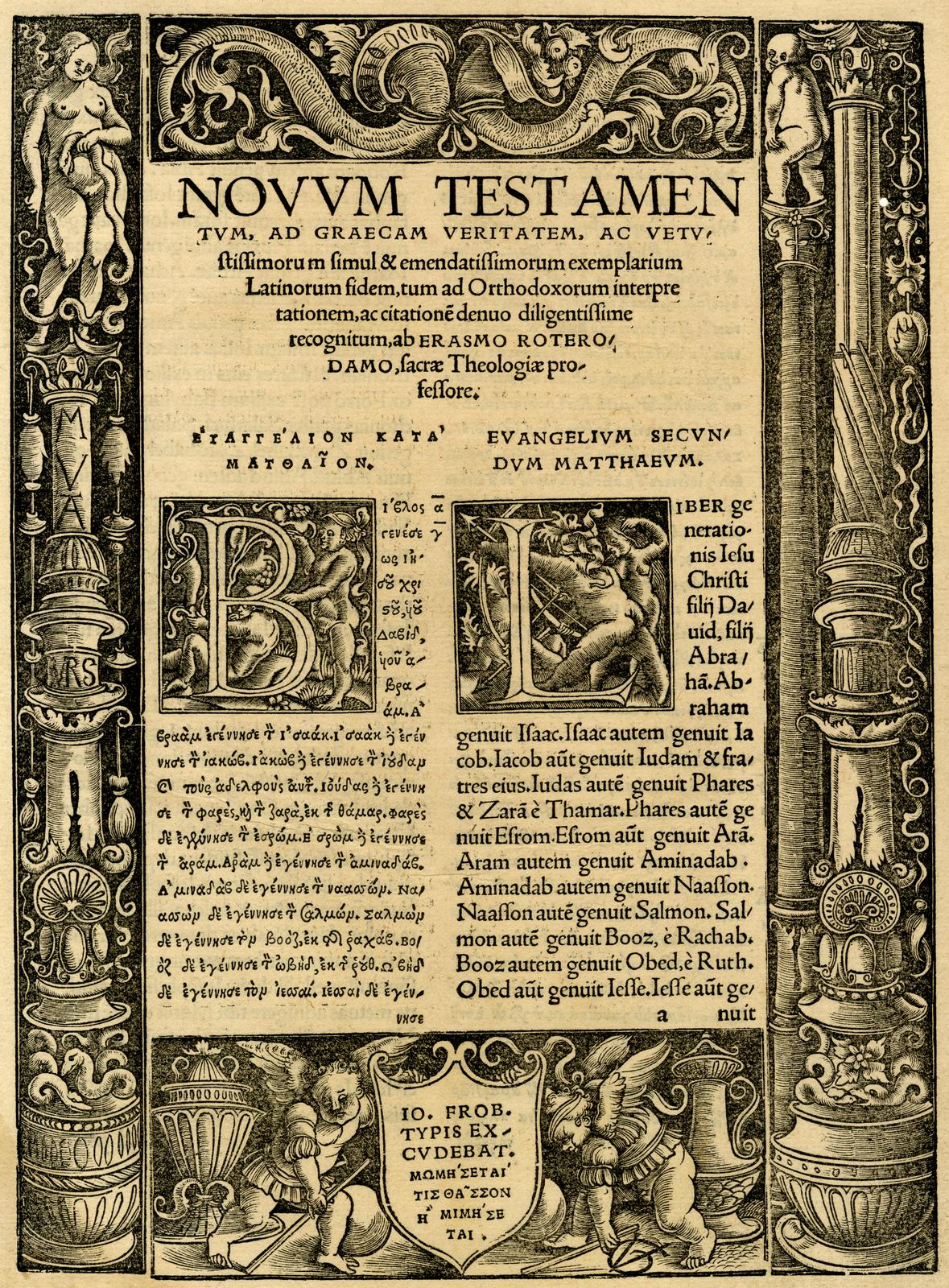
First page of Gospel according to Matthew, Froben (1521)

Erasmus said the printing of the first edition was "precipitated rather than published", resulting in a number of transcription errors. After comparing what writings he could find, Erasmus wrote corrections between the lines of the manuscripts he was using (among which was Minuscule 2) and sent them as proofs to Froben. His access to Greek manuscripts was limited compared to modern scholars and he had to rely on Jerome's late-4th century Vulgate to fill in the blanks.

His effort was hurriedly published by his friend Johann Froben of Basel in 1516 and thence became the first published Greek New Testament, the Novum Instrumentum omne, diligenter ab Erasmo Rot. Recognitum et Emendatum. Erasmus used several Greek manuscript sources because he did not have access to a single complete manuscript. Most of the manuscripts were, however, late Greek manuscripts of the Byzantine textual family and Erasmus used the oldest manuscript the least because "he was afraid of its supposedly erratic text." He also ignored some manuscripts that were at his disposal which are now deemed older and better.

In the second (1519) edition, the more familiar term Testamentum was used instead of Instrumentum. Together, the first and second editions sold 3,300 copies. By comparison, only 600 copies of the Complutensian Polyglot were ever printed. This edition was used by Martin Luther in his German translation of the Bible, written for people who could not understand Latin. The first and second edition texts did not include the passage (1 John 5:7–8) that has become known as the Comma Johanneum. Erasmus had been unable to find those verses in any Greek manuscript, but one was supplied to him during production of the third edition. (Note: The Catholic Church decreed that the Comma Johanneum was open to dispute (2 June 1927), and it is rarely included in modern scholarly translations.)

The third edition of 1522 was probably used by William Tyndale for the first English New Testament (Worms, 1526) and was the basis for the 1550 Robert Stephanus edition used by the translators of the Geneva Bible and King James Version of the English Bible. Erasmus published a fourth edition in 1527 containing parallel columns of Greek, Latin Vulgate and Erasmus's Latin texts. In this edition Erasmus also supplied the Greek text of the last six verses of Revelation (which he had translated from Latin back into Greek in his first edition) from Cardinal Ximenez de Cisneros's Biblia Complutensis. (Note: Erasmus had a good relationship with Cisneros, who defended Erasmus against Stunica: "Cisneros was very open to the northern influences particularly the writings of the humanist (Erasmus) because of its focus on mental prayer, and piety which were consistent with his Franciscan mysticism." Cisneros was at times Archbishop of Toledo, the nominal head of the Inquisition and the co-regent of Spain. Erasmus was also personal friends with Cisneros' Latin secretary Juan de Vergara, and exchanged polite-ish letters with several of the Complutensian team, some of whom vehemently opposed his translation.) In 1535 Erasmus published the fifth (and final) edition which dropped the Latin Vulgate column but was otherwise similar to the fourth edition. Later versions of the Greek New Testament by others, but based on Erasmus's Greek New Testament, became known as the Textus Receptus.

Erasmus dedicated his work to Pope Leo X as a patron of learning and regarded this work as his chief service to the cause of Christianity. Immediately afterwards, he began the publication of his Paraphrases of the New Testament, a popular presentation of the contents of the several books. These, like all of his writings, were published in Latin but were quickly translated into other languages with his encouragement.

=== The Complaint of Peace (1517) ===
Lady Peace complains about warmongering. This book was written at the request of the Burgundian Chancellor, who was then seeking a peace deal with France, to influence the zeitgeist. The recently completed Fifth Council of the Lateran had strongly called for clerics and influencers to lobby for peace within Christianity. (Note: "Further, whoever of those mentioned above think that, by influence or favour with secular princes of any rank, distinction or dignity, or with their advisers, associates, attendants or officials, or with the magistrates, rectors and lieutenants of cities, towns, universities or any secular institutions, or with other persons of either sex, ecclesiastical or secular, they can take steps towards a universal or particular peace between princes, rulers and christian peoples, and towards the campaign against the infidels, let them use strong encouragement and lead them on to this peace and the campaign. " Session 9)

On the use of battle standards featuring crosses: (Note: The standard of the cross image invokes, but to some extent contradicts, the imagery of St Catherine of Sienna, who used it to call for European peace in order for joint military relief of the Holy Lands: she finished many letters with "pace, pace, pace." Esther Cohen, Holy women as spokeswomen for peace in late medieval Europe, in Friedman, Yvonne (2018). Religion and peace: historical aspects. London: Routledge. ISBN 978-1138694248.)

That cross is the standard of him who conquered, not by fighting, but by dying; who came, not to destroy men's lives, but to save them. It is a standard, the very sight of which might teach you what sort of enemies you have to war against, if you are a christian, and how you may be sure to gain the victory. I see you, while the standard of salvation is in one hand, rushing on with a sword in the other, to the murder of your brother; and, under the banner of the cross, destroying the life of one who to the cross owes his salvation.

— The Complaint of Peace

The final paragraph of The Complaint of Peace finishes with the command resipiscite, meaning a voluntary return from madness and unconsciousness:

At last! Enough and more than enough blood has been spilled, human blood, and if that were little, even Christian blood. Enough has been squandered in mutual destruction, enough already sacrificed to Orcus and the Furies and to nourish the eyes of the Turks. The comedy is at an end. Finally, after tolerating far too long the miseries of war, repent!

However, the subsequent European wars of religion which accompanied the Reformation resulted in the deaths of between 7 and 18 million Europeans, including up to one third of the population of Germany.

=== Paraphrases of the New Testament (1517–1524, 1532, 1534) ===
"If I have my way, the farmer, the smith, the stone-cutter will read him (Christ), prostitutes and pimps will read him, even the Turks will read him. ...If it be the ploughman guiding his plough, let him chant in his own language the mystic psalms."

— Paraphrase of St Matthew

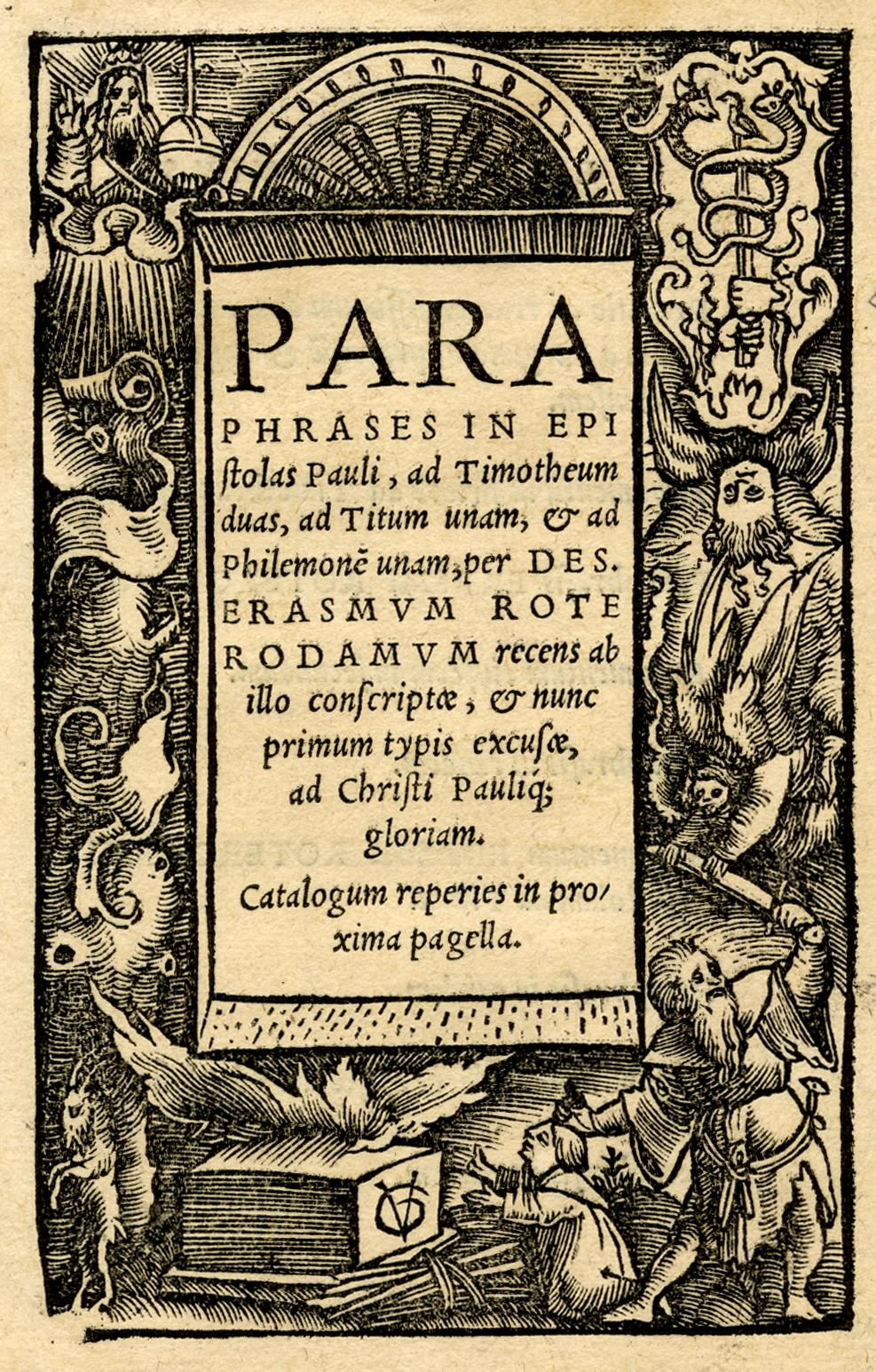
Title page of Paraphrase of Pauline Epistles(1520) Abraham and Isaac lower right, the goat lower left, God the Father top left, the printer's mark top right

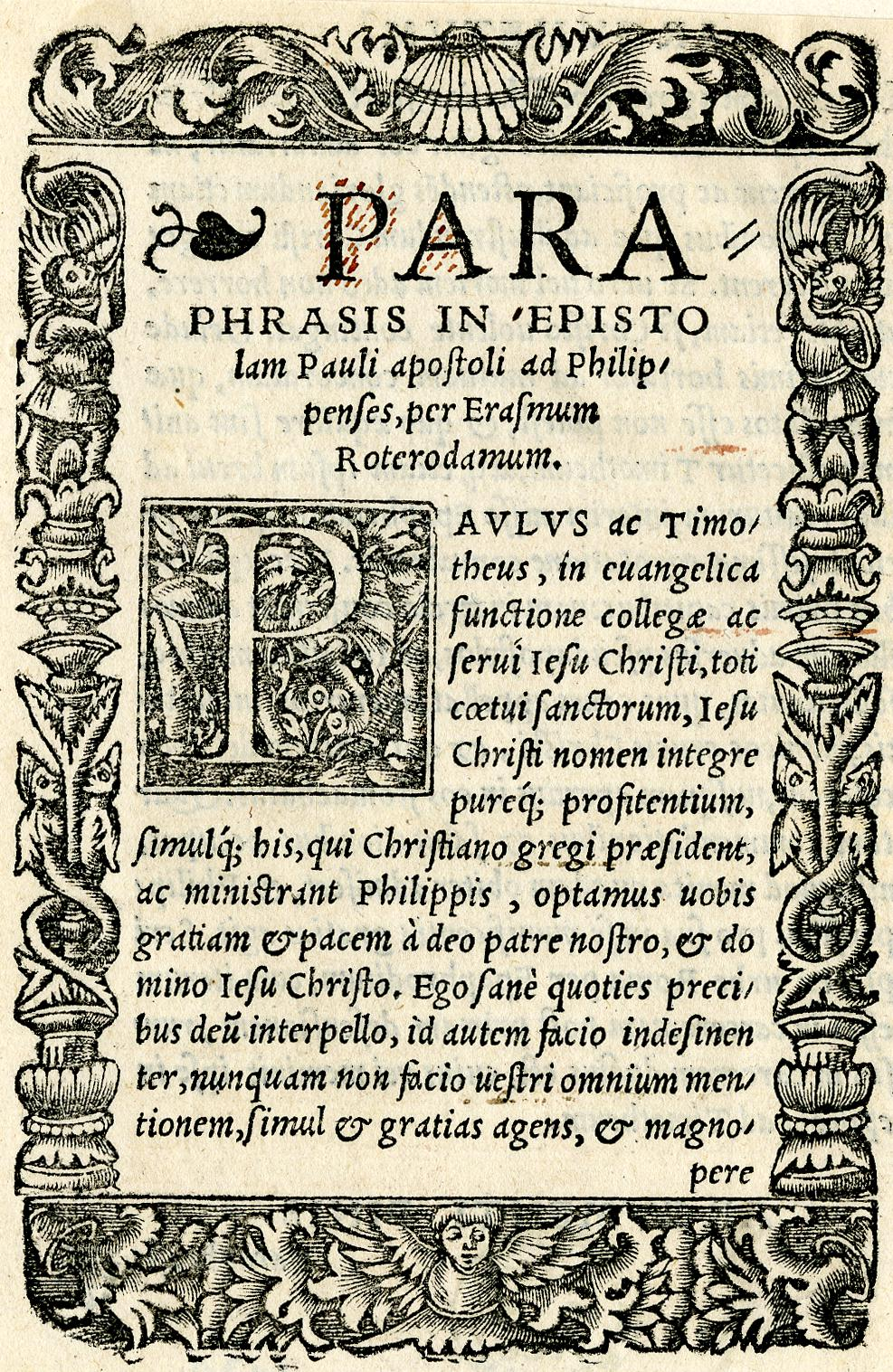
Paraphrase (1520s), with initial capital woodcut by Hans Holbein

Erasmus described his editorial intent with the Paraphrases of the New Testament as philological rather than theological: "to fill in the gaps, to soften the abrupt ones, to digest the confused ones, to develop the developed ones, to explain the knotty ones, to add light to the dark ones, to give (Paul's) Hebraicisms a Roman polish [...] and thus to moderate παραφρασιννε παραφρόνησις: that is, 'to say otherwise so as not to say otherwise.'" (Note: Latin: "hiantia committere, abrupta mollire, confusa digerere, evoluta evolvere, nodosa explicare, obscuris lucem addere, hebraismum romana civitate donare [...] et ita temperare παράφρασινne fiat παραφρόνησις, h. e. sic aliter dicere ut non dicas alia." Dedicatory preface ad Card. Grimanum to Paraphrase of the Pauline Epistles, apud Schaff, Philip. History of the Christian Church, Volume VII. Modern Christianity. The German Reformation - Christian Classics Ethereal Library.) Paraphrases, a genre he may have invented, allowed him to sideline modern Scholastic theology.

He brought out the Paraphrases progressively: Romans (1517), Corinthians (1519), the rest of the Epistles throughout 1520 and 1521, and the four Gospels and Acts from 1522 to 1524. He did not put out a paraphrase of the Book of Revelation.

According to Erasmus: "A paraphrase is not a translation but something looser, a kind of commentary in which the writer and his author retain separate roles." For Erasmus, the purpose of reading scripture was not to theologize (in the scholastic or Lutheran mode) but to have a mystical and transformative encounter; consequently, his philological commentary and translation choices sometimes failed to provide what current theology demanded. (Note: That Erasmus (like Cajetan) produced paraphrases (expansions) rather than vernacular translations demonstrates his Catholic scepticism that there could be successful word-for-word or even thought-for-thought translations, of difficult scriptures from damaged texts, into early vernaculars without the necessary theological or philosophical vocabularies: instead, what was needed was more expansive commentary and material for explanatory sermons. Erasmus excluded the Gospels and Psalms, them being broadly comprehensible to the laity without such specialist theological or historical background.)

The Paraphrases allowed Erasmus to amplify the text of the New Testament by integrating philological and theological points from his scholarly Annotations, allowing more of a role for his personal opinions or angles, but in a less scholarly format. Unusually, Erasmus gives paraphrases of the speech of Christ in the persona of Christ in the Gospels, and for each Epistle uses the voice of the Apostle, not Erasmus or a neutral third person as is conventional. Unlike traditional medieval exegesis, which for some authors treated the whole of the scriptures as a single unified document of propositions which, because they had the same divine author, could be mixed and matched as necessary, Erasmus treated each individual book as the literary unit that limited intertextual combination.

Erasmus wrote his paraphrases of the Gospels at the same time as his study of Luther's work in preparation for 1524's On Free Will, On the Immense Mercy of God, etc. Some scholars see an increased explicit promotion of faith and grace in these paraphrases, with Erasmus attempting to accommodate some of Luther's exegesis, and Protestant thematic requirements, though not their theology.

The Paraphrases were very well-received, particularly in England, by most parties.

Biographer Roland Bainton nominated the following passage as "the essence of Erasmus": (Note: The positivity to natural affection accords with the Catholic analogia entis pattern and may be contrasted the Lutheran total depravity doctrine.)

"Now in the natural love of this father for his son behold the goodness of God, who is far more clement to sinful man, if only he repents and despises himself, than any father to his son, however tenderly he may love him."

— Erasmus, Paraphrase of St Matthew

=== Method of True Theology ===
The Ratio seu methodus compendio perveniendi ad veram theologia was originally the Preface to the first edition of his New Testament, but was expanded and had a life of its own.

"The Ratio sets out a whole programme of theological thought, and an ideal of spirituality. If there is a Reformism proper to Erasmus—previously sketched in the Enchiridion, later defined in the polemic against Luther in the Hyperaspites, and vulgarized in the Ecclesiastes—then assuredly we must look to the Ratio for its fundamental exposition."

— Louis Bouyer

Following Origen, Erasmus in effect resuscitates lectio divina as the core activity of real theology. (Note: For "the early Christian practitioners of lectio divina[...](being read the text)[...]was considered a form of being spoken to by God who was believed to be present in the texts. Lectio divina draws the reader—as a listener to God’s Word—into the text[...] Gregory the Great positioned himself within the monastic orthopraxis of lectio divina. For him studying scripture was contemplatio, and it was both a communal (collatio) and moving (compunctio) act.) Following Tertullian, Erasmus stresses that adoration and reverence were the proper attitudes of a Christian (and therefore any Christian theology) toward God and the sacred mysteries and that all impia curiositas must be eschewed especially in favour of educated and humble contemplation of Christ's personality and human interactions in the Gospels.

Spanish dogmatic theologian Melchor Cano characterized it along the nuanced line "Erasmus believed that for theological education nothing more should be determined than what is contained in the sacred books."

=== Familiar Colloquies (1518-1533) ===
The Colloquia familiaria began as simple spoken Latin exercises for schoolboys to encourage fluency in colloquial Latin interaction, but expanded in number, ambition and audience. The conversations are frequently dialogs suited for performance, from two to fifty pages long. A scholarly work notes "only the first of those famous dialogues were intended for boys and for classes; all colloquies added after 1522 were criticisms destined for grown-ups, represented in an innocent-like fashion." The sensational nature or frank subjects of many of the Colloquies made it a prime target for censorship.

Notable Colloquies include the exciting Naufragium (Shipwreck), the philosophical and path-forging The Epicurean, and the zany catalogue of fantastic animal stories Friendship.

For example, A Religious Pilgrimage deals with many serious subjects humorously, and scandalously includes a letter supposedly written by a Statue of the Virgin Mary to Zwingli, in which, while it first thanks the reformer for following Luther against needlessly invoking saints (where the listed invocations are all for sinful or wordly things), becomes a warning against iconoclasm (Note: "Erasmus himself deprecated excessive devotion to images, but deplored iconoclasm. For him, both extremes represented a focus on the external trappings rather than the inner truths of religion." Rex, Richard (2014). "The Religion of Henry Viii". The Historical Journal. 57 (1): 1–32. doi:10.1017/S0018246X13000368. ISSN 0018-246X. JSTOR 24528908. S2CID 159664113. p 17) and stripping altars.

Amicitia (Friendship) can be considered a sweet companion piece to the vinegary Spongia of the same year.

=== A Sponge to wipe away the Spray of Hutten (1523) ===
As a result of his reformatory activities, Erasmus found himself at odds with some reformers and some Catholic churchmen. His last years were made difficult by controversies with men toward whom he was sympathetic. (Note: "Against his own advice, he took part in a series of public controversies with men he called 'barking dogs.' They hounded him to his grave." Regier, Willis (1 January 2011). "Review of Erasmus, Controversies: Collected Works of Erasmus, vol. 78, trans. Peter Matheson, Peter McCardle, Garth Tissol, and James Tracy". Bryn Mawr Review of Comparative Literature. 9 (2). ISSN 1523-5734.)

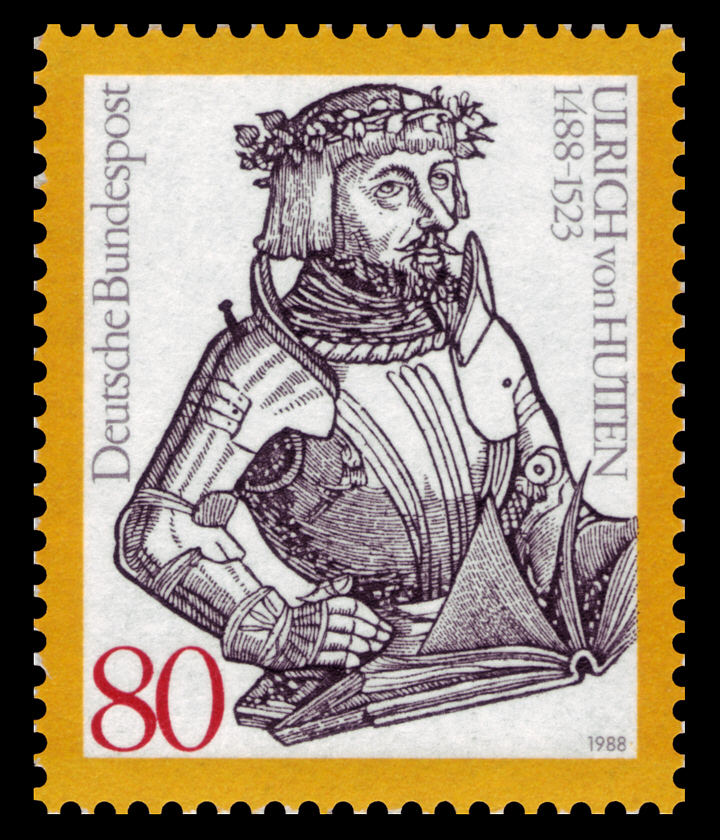
Ulrich von Hutten (1988)

Notable among these was Ulrich von Hutten, once a friend, a brilliant but erratic genius who had thrown himself into the Lutheran cause (and militant German nationalism.) Erasmus claimed that von Hutten, who had a long history of adventure, violence and manslaughter, and had proposed a literal war against the clergy, had extorted money from a Carthusian monastery, highway robbed three Abbots, and cut the ears off two Benedictines.

Von Hutten declared that Erasmus, if he had a spark of honesty, would throw himself into Luther's cause and help to subdue the Pope. Hutten published a book in 1523 Ulrichi ab Hutten cum Erasmo Rotirodamo, Presbytero, Theologo, Expostulatio. In his reply in the same year, Spongia adversus aspergines Hutteni, Erasmus accused von Hutten of having misinterpreted his utterances about reform and reiterates his determination never to break with the Catholic Church.

Erasmus returns multiple times to the issue that old friendships should be maintained (not betrayed) and that scholarly expertise should be acknowledged, but that neither of these should imply agreement or endorsement in total or in part with each other's views. Nor should the acknowledgement of a strained relationship or the absence of some polite title be construed as necessarily an avowal of an opposing view. Erasmus advocated being a moderating friend and a constructive voice of sanity, even to sincere but civil partisans of either side.

Historian Francis Aidan Gasquet regarded this book as necessary for understanding Erasmus' true position on Rome, quoting:

"I have never approved of (the Roman See's) tyranny, rapacity, and other vices about which of old common complaints were heard from good men. Neither do I sweepingly condemn ‘Indulgences,’ though I have always disliked any barefaced traffic in them. What I think about ceremonies, many places in my works plainly show.… What it may mean ‘to reduce the Pope to order’ I do not rightly understand. First, I think it must be allowed that Rome is a Church, for no number of evils can make it cease to be a Church, otherwise we should have no Churches whatever. Moreover, I hold it to be an orthodox Church; and this Church, it must be admitted, has a Bishop. Let him be allowed also to be Metropolitan, seeing there are very many archbishops in countries where there has been no apostle, and Rome, without controversy, had certainly SS. Peter and Paul, the two chief apostles. Then how is it absurd that among Metropolitans the chief place be granted to the Roman Pontiff?"

— Erasmus, Spongia trans, Gasquet

Erasmus noted that he would not renounce old friends because they took sides for or against Luther, noting that several had changed their minds again.

The paradoxes of Luther are not worth dying for. “There is no question of articles of faith, but of such matters as ‘Whether the supremacy of the Roman Pontiff was established by Christ:’ ‘whether cardinals are necessary to the Christian Church:’ ‘whether confession is de jure divino:’ ‘whether bishops can make their laws binding under pain of mortal sin:’ ‘whether free will is necessary for salvation:’ ‘whether faith alone assures salvation,’ etc. If Christ gave him grace,” Erasmus hopes that “he would be a martyr for His truth, but he has no desire whatever to be one for Luther.”

— Gasquet, The Eve of the Reformation quoting Erasmus, Spongia

Erasmus' break with the endangering Lutheran poet-scholar-knight von Hutten was complete, even refusing (or making it too difficult) to see him when von Hutten, homeless and dying of syphilis, passed through Basel in 1523 and found refuge with humanists there. (Note: Von Hutten was fleeing after fighting on the losing side in the Knights' War (1522), and finally was directed by Zwingli in Zurich to a small island owned by a Benedictine abbey, where he died in relative seclusion in what may have been a syphilis hospice, supported by the local Protestant pastor.)

=== On Free Will (1524), Hyperaspistes (1526–27) ===
Erasmus wrote On Free Will (De libero arbitrio) (1524) against Luther's view on free will: that everything happens by strict necessity. (Note: Written to refute Martin Luther's doctrine of "enslaved will", according to Alister McGrath, Luther believed that only Erasmus, of all his interlocutors, understood and appreciated the locus of his doctrinal emphases and reforms. McGrath, Alister (2012). Iustitia Dei (3rd ed.). 3.4: "Justification in Early Lutheranism": Cambridge University Press. pp. xiv+ 448.)

Erasmus lays down both sides of the argument impartially. In this controversy Erasmus lets it be seen that, from the thrust of Scripture, he would like to claim more for free will than St. Paul and St. Augustine seem to allow according to Luther's interpretation. For Erasmus the essential point is that humans have the freedom of choice, when responding to prior grace (synergism). (On issues such as this, where arguments can be made from Scripture on both sides, Erasmus affirmed that believers should, for the sake of unity and concord, follow definitive Sacred Tradition if it existed or agree to disagree otherwise.)

On the same day as publishing De libero arbitrio diatribe sive Erasmus also published Concio de immensa Dei misericordia (Sermon on the Immense Mercy of God) which presented his positive alternative to Lutheranism: where Grace serves Mercy.

In response, Luther wrote his De servo arbitrio (On the Bondage of the Will) (1525), which attacked "On Free Will" and Erasmus himself, going so far as to claim that Erasmus was not a Christian. "Free will does not exist", according to Luther in that sin makes human beings completely incapable of bringing themselves to God (monergism).

Erasmus responded with a lengthy, two-part book Hyperaspistes (1526–27). (Note: Hyperaspistes means protected by a shield (i.e., self-defence) but also, countering Luther's calling of Erasmus as a viper, 'SuperSnake'. Note 7, "Martin Luther > Notes (Stanford Encyclopedia of Philosophy/Winter 2022 Edition)". plato.stanford.edu.)

=== Concio de immensa Dei misericordia (1524) ===
The book Sermon on the Immense Mercy of God presented Erasmus' positive alternative to Lutheranism: where Grace serves Mercy. Erasmus sought to establish that God' mercifulness precluded that God was arbitrary, thus ruling out the Wycliffean "necessity of all things" that Luther was dabbling in, and which underlay Jean Calvin's theory of pre-destination.

Erasmus' book may have built on Alger of Liège's book De Misericordia et Justitia which treated the interplay of mercy and justice as policies rather than virtues: for Erasmus, "mercy is justice in a higher form."

It went through twenty editions in Latin, and was translated into several other languages. The Spanish version is Sermón de la grandeza y muchedumbre de las misericordias de Dios (1528, 1544, 1549).

The 1531 English translation by Gentian Hervet is A sermon of the excedynge great mercy of god. Scholars have noted the similarity in ideas, argument and even words in Shakespeare: notably in Portia's "The quality of mercy" speech and others, and various speeches of Measure for Measure 's Isabella.

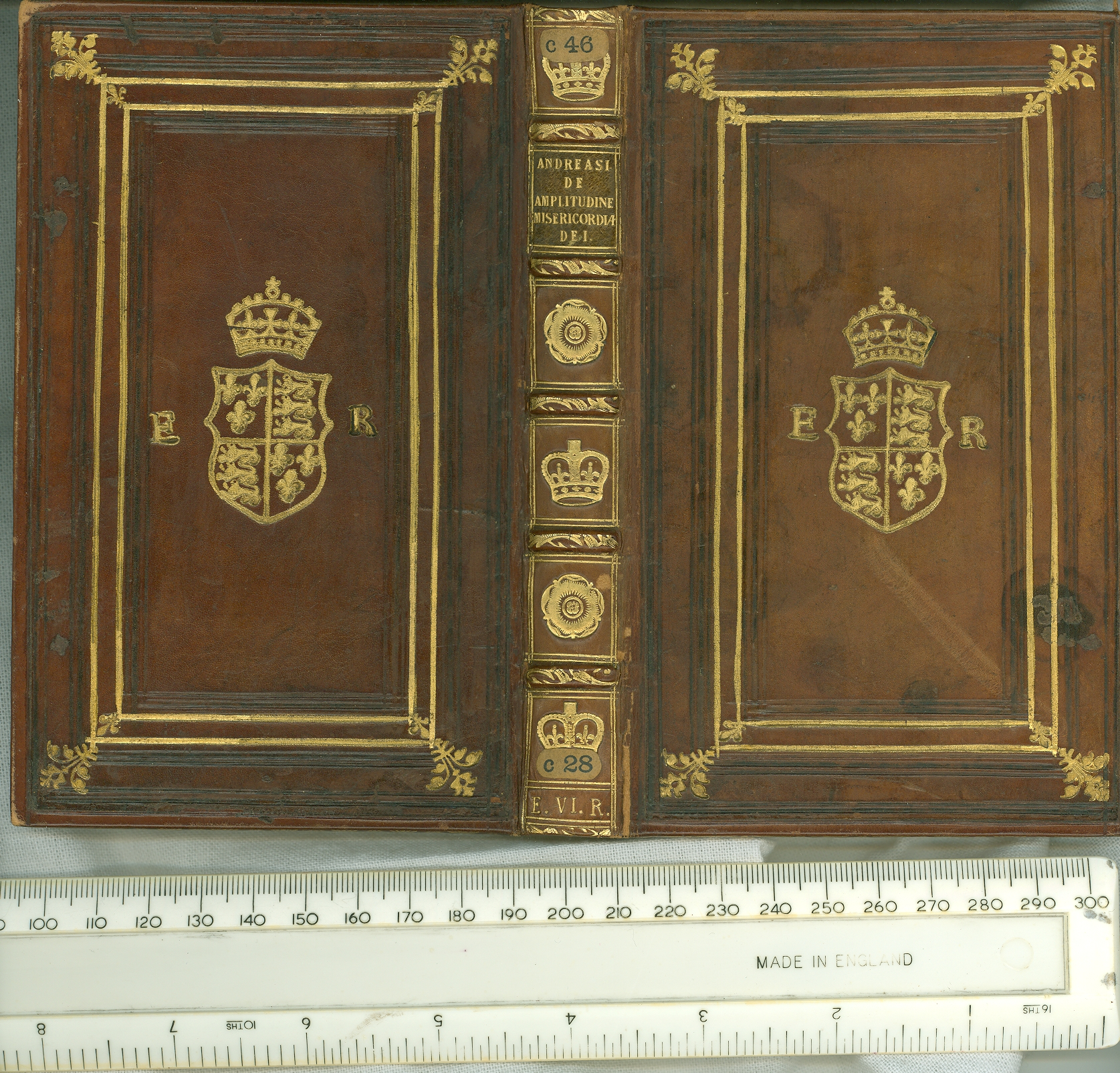
Orazio Curione's 1550 book on the immense mercy of God

Curiously, it was translated into Italian under the name of the Mantuan politician Marsilio Andreasi as Trattato divoto et utilissimo della Divina misericordia then later re-translated back into Latin by Orazio Curione in Basel in 1550 with the connection to Erasmus hidden. Curione's father, exiled Italian Protestant Celio Secondo Curione, himself re-wrote his son's book in 1555 as Coelii secundi curionis de amplitudine beati regni dei. The connection with Erasmus may have been deliberately suppressed rather than accidentally forgotten: Curione was friends in Basel with Erasmus' publisher godson, Hieronymus Froben, after all. There were two more Italian translations and printings (Trattato della grandeza della misericordie del Signore di Erasmo Roterodamo, Brescia, 1542; Venice, 1554.)

=== Liturgy of the Virgin Mother venerated at Loreto (1525) ===
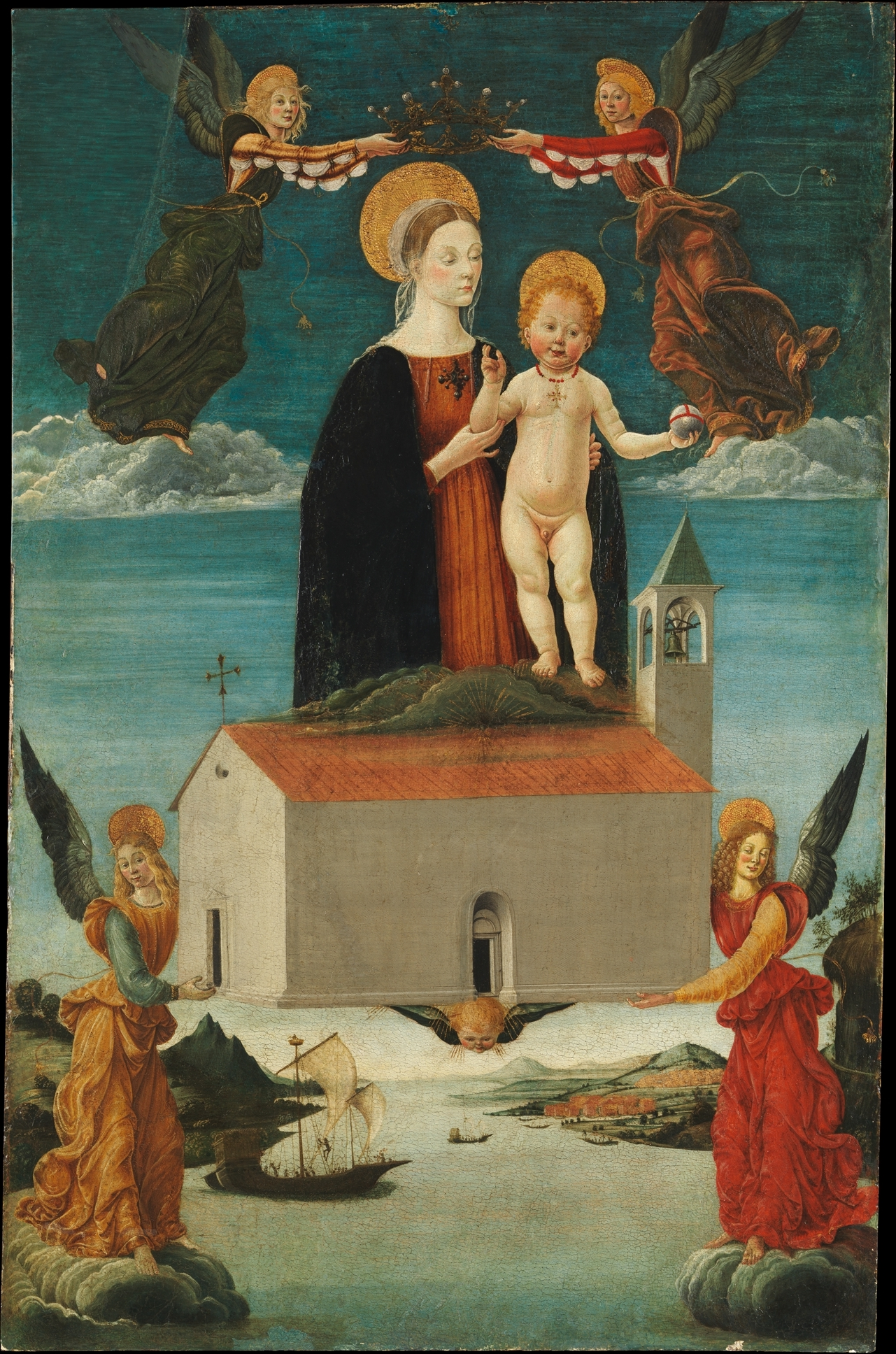
The Translation of the Holy House of Loreto, anonymous, Italian (1510)

Editions: 1523, 1525, 1529

This liturgy for a Catholic Mass, with sequences and a homily teaching that for Mary, and the Saints, imitation should be the chief part of veneration.

Fair choir of angels,
take up the zither, take up the lyre.
The Virgin Mother must be celebrated in song,
in a virginal ode.
The angels, joining in the song,
will re-echo your voice.
For they love virgins,
being virgins themselves.

The liturgy re-framed the existing Marian devotions: as a substitute for mentioning the Holy House of Loreto, he used the meaning of Loreto as 'laurel', as in the champion's laurel wreath. The work also may have been intended to demonstrate the proper application of indulgences, as it came with one from the archbishop of Besançon.

=== The Tongue (or Language) (1525) ===
The writings of Erasmus exhibit a continuing concern with language, and in 1525 he devoted an entire treatise to the subject, Lingua. This and several of his other works are said to have provided a starting point for a philosophy of language, though Erasmus did not produce a completely elaborated system. It includes a "systematic denunciation of all forms of seditious expression."

Erasmus characteristically viewed language providentially and in relation to peace: according to textual historian Margaret O'Rourke Boyle, "The gift of speech was ‘the principal reconciler of human relationships' conferred by the Creator ‘so that people might live together more agreeably.’"

=== On the Institution of Christian Marriage (1526) ===
The Institutio matrimonii was published in 1526 as treatise about marriage, and dedicated to Catherine of Aragon, who had befriended Erasmus and More. He did not follow the contemporary mainstream which saw the woman as a subject to the man, but suggested the man was to love the woman similar as he would Christ, who also descended to earth to serve. He saw the role of the woman as a socia (partner) to the man.

The relationship should be of amicitia (Note: Erasmus wrote a colloquy Amicitia considered generally, which mentioned the mutual sympathy of Thomas More and his monkey. Cummings, Brian (12 November 2020). "Erasmus and the Colloquial Emotions". Erasmus Studies. 40 (2): 127–150. doi:10.1163/18749275-04002004. S2CID 228925860.) (sweet and mutual fondness). Erasmus suggested that true marriage between devout Christians required a true friendship (contrary to contemporary legal theories that required community consensus or consummation); and because true friendship never dies, divorce of a true marriage was impossible; the seeking of a divorce was a sign that the true friendship (and so the true marriage) never existed and so the divorce should be allowed, after investigation and protecting the individuals. (Note: Erasmus, in his Annotations on the New Testament, makes the related point that the sacrament of marriage requires an exacting standard of consent: "I admit that there is no marriage without mutual consent, but it must be sober consent, not consent extorted by craft or in the midst of intoxication, but consent given with the counsel of friends, as is appropriate in something that can never be undone and that deserves to be numbered among the sacraments of the church. But when, after investigating the case carefully, a bishop or other legitimate judges dissolve the kind of marriage I have described, this is not a case of ‘man separating what God has joined together.’ In fact, what youth, wine, rashness, ignorance has wrongly glued together, what the devil has wickedly bound together through his ministers, the panderers and bawds, this God rightly separates through his servants.") In his Colloquia Erasmus raised issues such as being practical in courtship ("On Courtship"), (arranged) marriages between the very young and the very old, and (forced) marriage to a partner with syphilis ("The Unequal Marriage".)

As far as sex in marriage is concerned, Erasmus' gentle, gradualist asceticism promoted that a mutually-agreed celibate marriage, if God had made this doable by the partners, could be the ideal: in theory it allowed more opportunity for spiritual pursuits. But he controversially noted

Since everything else has been designed for a purpose, it hardly seems probable that in this one matter alone nature was asleep. I have no patience with those who say that sexual excitement is shameful and that venereal stimuli have their origin not in nature, but in sin.

=== The Ciceronians (1528) ===
The Ciceronianus came out in 1528, attacking Ciceronianism, the style of Latin that was based exclusively and fanatically on Cicero's writings. Étienne Dolet wrote a riposte titled Erasmianus in 1535. Erasmus' own Latin style was late classical (i.e., from Terence to Jerome) as far as syntax and grammar, but freely used medievalisms in its vocabulary.

=== Explanation of the Apostles' Creed (1530) ===
In his catechism (entitled Explanation of the Apostles' Creed) (1530), Erasmus took a stand against Luther's recent Catechisms by asserting the unwritten Sacred Tradition as just as valid a source of revelation as the Bible, by enumerating the Deuterocanonical books in the canon of the Bible (Note: Erasmus public attitude was "It is not yet agreed in what spirit the Church now holds in public use books which the ancients with great consent reckoned among the Apocrypha. Whatever the authority of the Church has approved I embrace simply as a Christian man ought to do[...]Yet it is of great moment to know in what spirit the Church approves anything. For allowing that it assigns equal authority to the Hebrew Canon and the Four Gospels, it assuredly does not wish Judith, Tobit, and Wisdom to have the same weight as the Pentateuch." Preface to Jerome, apud Medford) and by acknowledging seven sacraments. He identified anyone who questioned the perpetual virginity of Mary as blasphemous. However, he supported lay access to the Bible.

In a letter to Nikolaus von Amsdorf, Luther objected to Erasmus's catechism and called Erasmus a "viper", "liar", and "the very mouth and organ of Satan".

=== On the amiable concord of the church (1533) ===
De amabili concordia ecclesiae took the form of a commentary on Psalm 83.

Erasmus recommended both sides (Catholic and Protestant) suspend mutual incriminations and meet in tolerance: agreeing to temporarily disagree on adiophora (matters of indifference) and agreeing to wait and accept some coming ecumenical council on akineta ("immoveable matters of faith based on clear scriptural precepts".)

The book was popular and reprinted. However, the issues that Erasmus suggested should be considered adiaphora (such as free will, auricular confession, married priests, the exact nature of the Eucharist) were, to key partisans on both sides, central and intolerable.

=== The Preacher (1536) ===
Erasmus had preached, but considered it a better use of his time to write books.

Erasmus's last major work, published the year of his death, is the Ecclesiastes or "Gospel Preacher" (Basel, 1536), a massive manual for preachers of around a thousand pages. Though somewhat unwieldy—it has been called "diffuse, prolix and confused"—because Erasmus was unable to edit it properly in his old age, it is in some ways the culmination of all of Erasmus's literary and theological learning and indeed, according to some scholars, the culmination of the previous millennium of preaching manuals since Augustine. It offered prospective preachers advice on important aspects of their vocation with abundant reference to classical and biblical sources.

It is also notable for calling for a mission program to outside Christendom to usefully occupy friars, castigating that commercial exploitation was prioritized over the Gospel. It called out the practice of taking criminal religious convicts and transferring them to the New World as missionaries.

=== Patristic Editions ===
According to Ernest Barker, "Besides his work on the New Testament, Erasmus laboured also, and even more arduously, on the early Fathers. Among the Latin Fathers he edited the works of St Jerome, St Hilary, and St Augustine; among the Greeks he worked on Irenaeus, Origen and Chrysostom."

==== Alleged forgery ====
In 1530, Erasmus, in his fourth edition of the works of Cyprian, introduced a treatise De duplici martyrio ad Fortunatum, which he attributed to Cyprian and presented as having been found by chance in an old library. This text, close to the works of Erasmus, both in content (hostility to the confusion between virtue and suffering) and in form, and of which no manuscript is known, contains at least one flagrant anachronism: an allusion to the persecution of Diocletian, persecution that took place long after the death of Cyprian. In 1544, the Dominican Henricus Gravius denounced the work as inauthentic and attributed its authorship to Erasmus or an imitator of Erasmus. In the twentieth century, the hypothesis of a fraud by Erasmus was rejected a priori by most of the great Erasmians, for example Percy Stafford Allen, but it is adopted by academics like Anthony Grafton.

== Works ==
The Catalogue of the Works of Erasmus (2023) runs to 444 entries (120 pages), almost all from the latter half of his life.

=== Complete editions of Erasmus ===
The Collected Works of Erasmus (or CWE) is an 89-volume set of English translations and commentary from the University of Toronto Press. As of May 2023, 66 of 89 volumes have been released.

The Erasmi opera omni, known as the Amsterdam Edition or ASD, is a 65 volume set of the original Latin works. As of 2022, 59 volumes have been released. This set does not include the correspondence, which has been collected in a Latin edition by P.S. Allen.

=== Letters ===
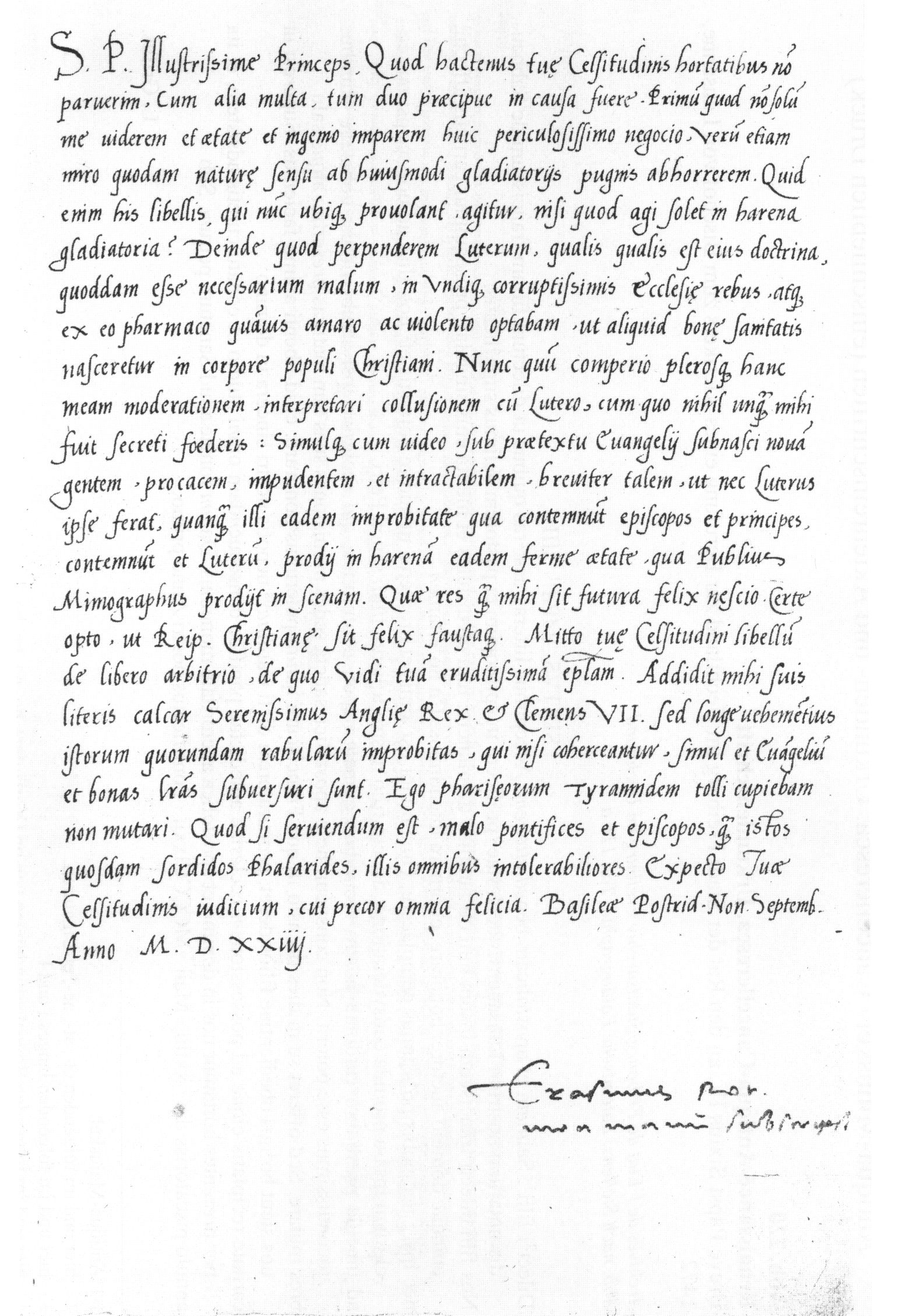
Erasmus, Letter to George, Duke of Saxony, (1524) giving Erasmus' view of Luther and the Reformation

The best sources for the world of European Renaissance Humanism in the early sixteenth century is the correspondence of Erasmus.

— Froude, "Preface", Life and Letters of Erasmus

Erasmus wrote or answered up to 40 letters per day, usually waking early in the morning and writing them in his own hand. Over 3,000 letters exist for a 52-year period, including to and from most Western popes, emperors, kings and their staff, as well as to leading intellectuals, bishops, reformers, fans, friends, and enemies.

His letters have been published in translation in the Complete Works of Erasmus. This has been accompanied by a three-volume reference book Contemporaries of Erasmus giving biographies of the over 1900 individuals he corresponded with or mentioned.

His private letters were eventually written in the knowledge that they could be intercepted by hostile opponents; he revised and rewrote letters for publication; his letters have a high amount of accommodation of his correspondents' views and strong irony, and a tendency to muddy the waters where danger is involved.

"I have never censured anything but human superstition and abuses. I only wish that I could drag the universal church to where I was struggling to lead it, so that, throwing off superstition, hypocrisy, worldly attachments, and frivolous little questions, we would all serve the Lord with pure hearts, each in his own vocation."

— Erasmus, Letter to Jean de Carondelet (1534)

=== Religious and political ===
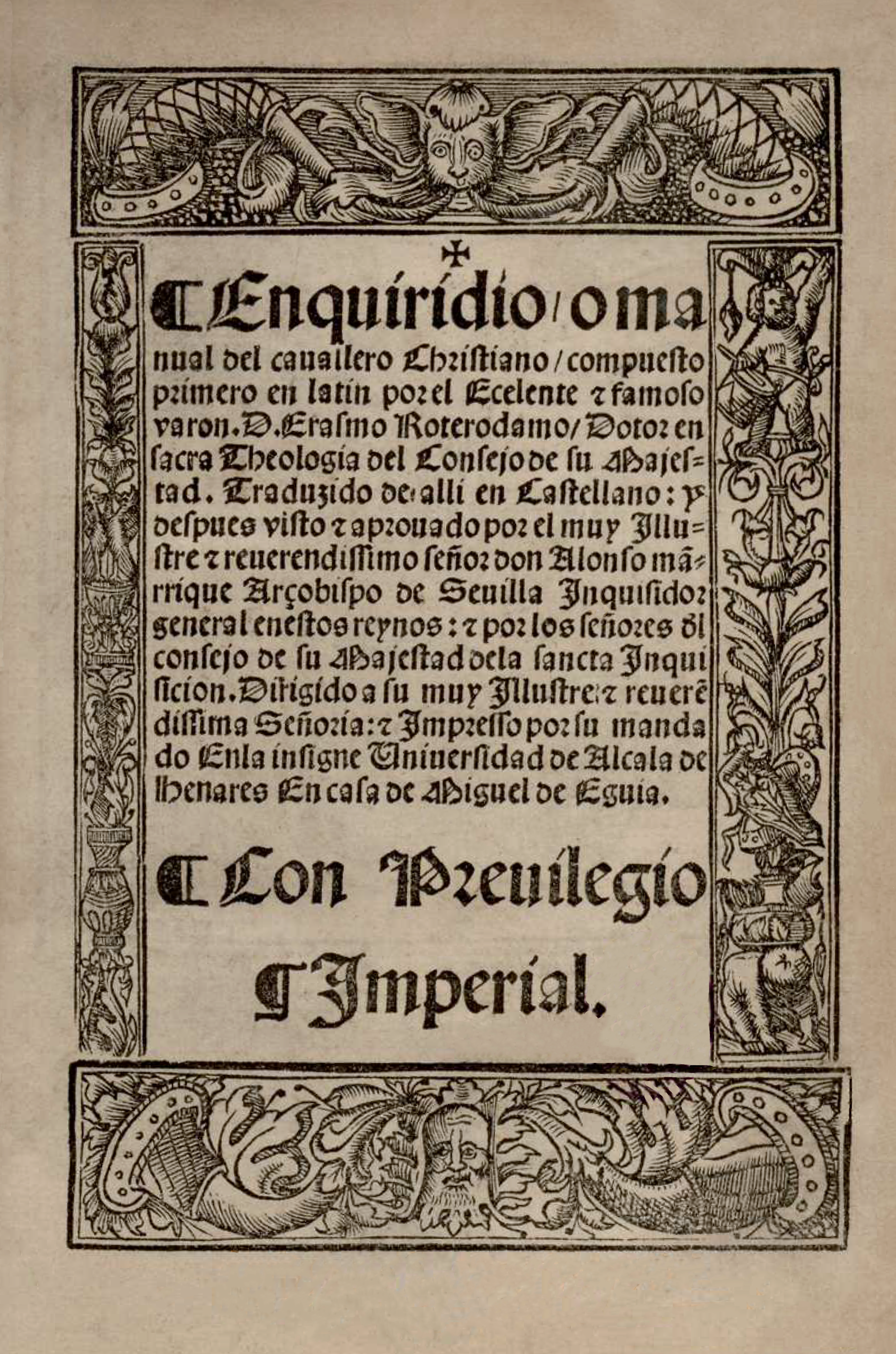
Enchiridion militis Christiani (1503), Spanish translation

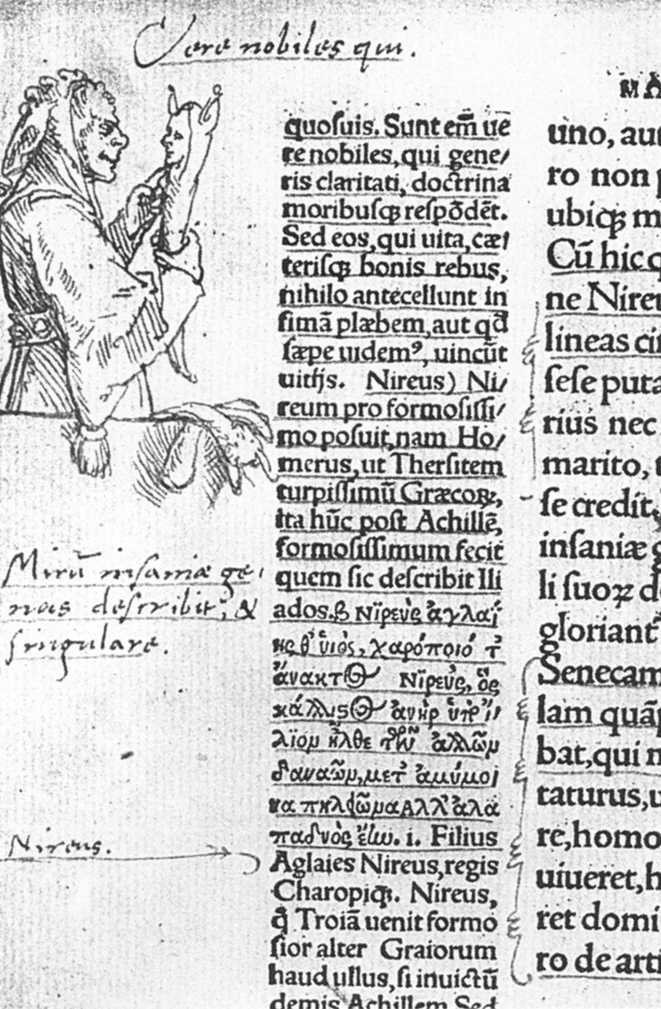
Marginal drawing of Folly by Hans Holbein in the first edition of Erasmus's Praise of Folly, 1515

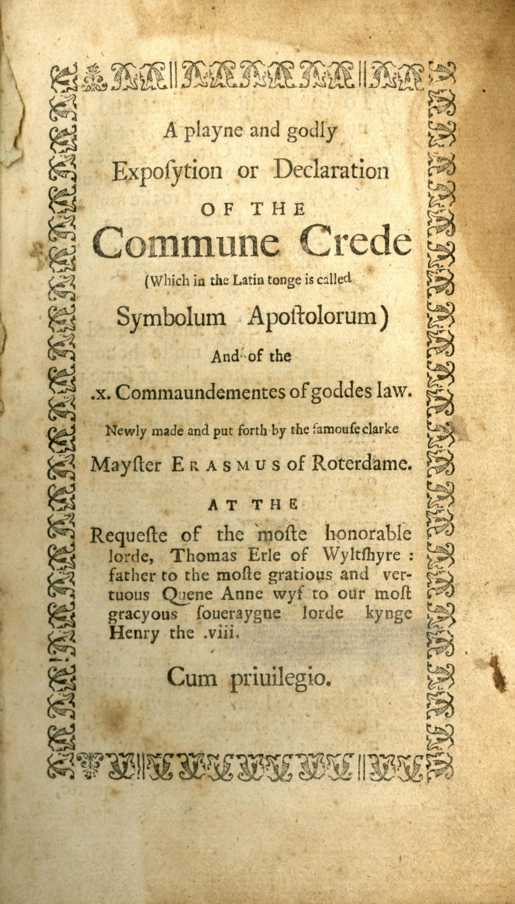
A Playne and Godly Exposition or Declaration of the Commune Crede, 2nd edition, 1533, English translation of Symbolum apostolorum

- Handbook of a Christian Knight (Latin: Enchiridion militis Christiani) (1503)
- The Silenus of Alcibiadis (Latin: Sileni alcibiadis (1515)
- The Education of a Christian Prince (Institutio principis Christiani) (1516)
- The Quarrel of Peace (Latin: Querela pacis) (1517)
  - (English translation)
- On the Immense Mercy of God (Latin: De immensa misericordia dei) (1524)
- On Free Will (Latin: De libero arbitrio diatribe sive collatio) (1524)
- Hyperaspistes 2 volumes (1526)
- The Institution of Christian Marriage (Latin: Institutio matrimonii) (1526)
- Consultations on the War on the Turks (Latin: Consultatio de bello turcis inferendo) (1530)
- On the Preparation for Death (Latin: De praeparatione ad mortem) (1533)
- On the Apostles' Creed (Latin: Symbolum apostolorum)
- The Preacher (Latin: Ecclesiastes) (1535)

=== Comedy and satire ===
- The Praise of Folly (Greek: Moriae encomium - Latin: Stultitiae laus) (1511)
  - (English translations)
- Preface to Plutarch's How to tell a Flatterer from a Friend (1514) (Dedication to Henry VIII)
- Julius Excluded from Heaven (1514) (attrib.)
- Colloquies (Colloquia) (1518)
  - (English translation)
- Ciceronianus (1528)

=== Culture and education ===
- Adages (Latin: Adagiorum collectanea) (1500) all editions usually called Adagia
  - Three Thousand Adages (Latin: Adagiorum chilliades tres) (1508)
  - Four Thousand Adages (Latin: Adagiorum ciliades quatuor) (1520)
- On the Method of Study (Latin: De ratione studii) (1511; 1512)
- Foundations of the Abundant Style (Latin: De utraque verborum ac rerum copia) (1512) often called De copia
- Introduction to the Eight Parts of Speech (Latin: De constructione octo partium prationis) (1515) - Erasmus' version of Lily's Grammar, sometimes called Brevissima Institutio
- Language, or the uses and abuses of language, a most useful book, (Latin: Lingua, Sive, De Linguae usu atque abusu Liber utillissimus) (1525)
- On the Correct Pronunciation of Latin and Greek (Latin: De recta Latini Graecique sermonis pronuntiatione) (1528)
- On Early Liberal Education for Children (Latin: De pueris statim ac liberaliter instituendis) (1529)
- On Civility in Children (Latin: De civilitate morum puerilium) (1530)
- Apophthegmatum opus (1531)
  - includes Opusculi plutarchi (c.1514)
    - includes How to tell a flatterer from a friend

=== New Testament ===
The 1516 edition had Erasmus' corrected Vulgate Latin and Greek versions. The subsequent revised editions had Erasmus' new Latin version and the Greek. The 1527 edition had both the Vulgate and Erasmus' new Latin with the Greek. These were accompanied by substantial annotations, methodological notes and paraphrases, in separate volumes.

- Novum Instrumentum omne (1516)
  - Novum Testamentum omne (1519, 1522, 1527,1536)
- In Novum Testamentum annotationes (1519, 1522, 1527,1535)
- Paraphrases of Erasmus (1517–1524)
  - The first tome or volume of the Paraphrase of Erasmus vpon the newe testamente (1548)

=== Patristic and classical editions ===
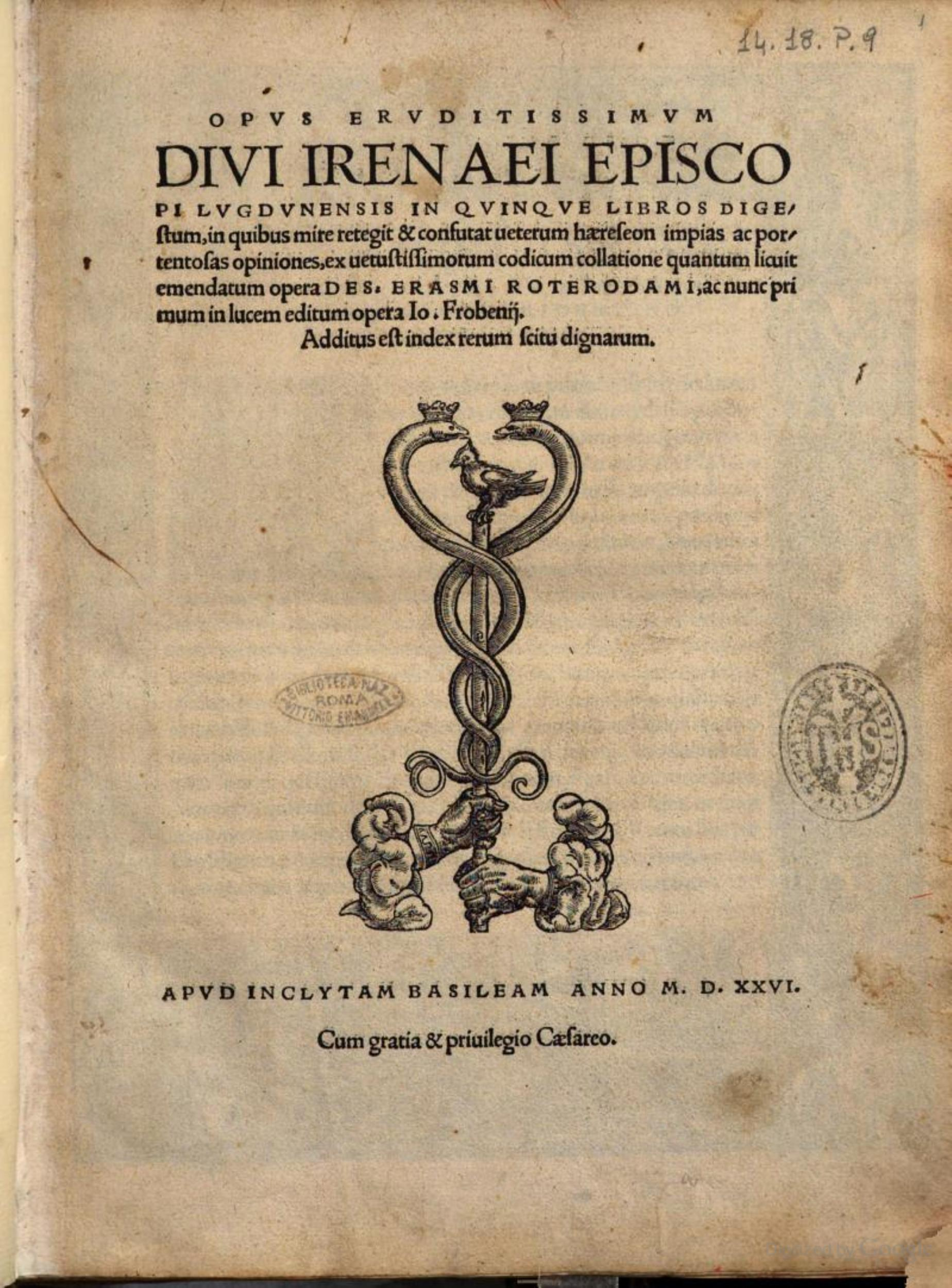
The title page of the princeps edition of Irenaeus's Against heresies, which was published by Erasmus at Johannes Froben's, Basel, 1526.

Froben was keen to exploit Erasmus' name as a brand: for the patristic and classical editions that came out under his name Erasmus was variously commissioning editor, acquisitions editor, and supervising editor often working with others. He was usually the primary translator and contributed at least prefaces, notes and biographies. His choice of authors may indicate an agenda of overcoming his scholastic and protestant critics by publicising Patristic tradition: Arnobius and Fastus of Riez against predestination, Alger of Liège against merely symbolic communion, etc.

- Complete Works of Jerome, nine volumes (1516) with biography, ed. ii (1526), ed. iii (1537, posthumous)
- Complete Works of Cyprian (1520–21)
- Commentary on the Psalms Arnobius the Younger (1522)
  - including Erasmus' own commentary on Psalm 2 Why do the nations rage
- Complete Works of Hilary of Poitiers (1523)
- Against Heresies, Irenaeus (1526)
- Complete Works of Ambrose (and Ambrosiaster), four volumes (1527)
- Origens Fragments on Matthew (1527)
- Works of Athanasius of Alexandria (1522–1527)
- On Grace (De gratia or Latin: De gratia Dei et humanae mentis libero arbitrio opus insigne) Faustus of Riez (1528)
- Complete Works of Augustine (1528, 1529)
- Works of Lactantius (1529)
- Epiphanius (1529)
- Complete Works of John Chrysostom, five volumes (1525–1530) with biography
- Works of Basil of Caesarea (1530)
- Homilies of Gregory of Nazianzus (1531)
- Complete Works of Origen, two volumes (1536) with biography (posthumous)

Late in his publishing career, Erasmus produced editions of two relatively obscure pre-scholastic but post-patristic writers:

- On the sacrament of the Lord's body and blood (Latin: De sacramento corporis et sanguinis Domini) Alger of Liège c.1111 (ed. 1530) (Note: According to philologist and Erasmus scholar Maria Fallica, "The edition[...]allows Erasmus to appropriate a moderate, orthodox, and Patristic intervention in the context of the medieval eucharistic controversy, which was particularly violent following the condemnation of Berengarius (d. 1088). Therefore, behind the mask of Alger, Erasmus was fighting the Swiss Reformers, who were styling themselves as modern followers of Berengarius and his symbolic Eucharistic theology. Moreover, through the edition of Alger, Erasmus can show himself as a fervent advocate of the Eucharistic real presence, in an alternative to the more recent and subtle scholastic speculation on the subject, which Erasmus had always opposed as too materialistic.")
- Commentary on Psalms of Haymo of Halberstadt attrib. c.835 (ed. 1533)

Classical writers whose works Erasmus translated or edited include Lucian (1506), Euripides (1508), Pseudo-Cato (1513), Curtius (1517), Suetonius (1518), Cicero (1523), Ovid and Prudentius (1524), Galen (1526), Seneca (1515, 1528), Plutarch (1512–1531), Aristotle (1531, Introduction to edition of Simon Grynaeus), Demosthenes (1532), Terence (1532), Ptolemy (1533), as well as Livy, Pliny, Libanius, Galen, Isocrates and Xenophon. Many of the Adagia translate adages from ancient and classical sources, notably from Aesop; many of Apophthegmata are from Platonists or Cynics.

=== Contemporary works ===
As well as his own writings and scholarly editions of classical, patristic and biblical works, done at the Aldine and Froben presses as well as various French and Brabantine presses, Erasmus occasionally saw the books of friends through publication.

Most notable are the satirical Latin works of his best friend Thomas More: Erasmus and More collaborated on an edition of Lucian's satires, Erasmus edited and published More's Utopia (and may be one of the characters in it), and collected More's pro-republican Epigrammata.
