= Philip Nichols (evangelical writer) =

Evangelical writer

Philip Nichols (or Philip Nicolles, Philip Nicolls) was an evangelical writer from the West Country active in the reign of King Edward VI. He was born in Ilfracombe, north Devon and he held property in south Devon. He was a client of the Protestant gentleman Sir Peter Carew and shared his patron's enthusiasm for reformed religion. In 1548, he made his modest reputation by publishing an open letter to Richard Crispin, a canon of Exeter Cathedral who had denounced Martin Luther in a sermon at Marldon on 24 March 1547. This letter, very polite by the standards of early modern religious controversy, aimed to prove that the Bible is the principal "touch stone, or triall" of whether religious teachings are true or false. On the accession of Queen Mary I, Nichols fled into exile, joining a Protestant colony at Aarau. He returned to England in the reign of Queen Elizabeth I, and unsuccessfully attempted to lobby Sir William Cecil to step up the pace of religious reform. Between 23 November 1562 and 22 June 1564, he held the living of Rimpton in the Diocese of Wells. The date of his death, like the date of his birth, is unknown.

== Mistaken attribution of "An answer to the articles of the commoners of Devonshire and Cornwall" ==
In 1549, a pro-government author wrote a manuscript tract entitled "An answer to the articles of the commoners of Devonshire and Cornwall", in response to the Prayer Book Rebellion. The authorship of this work was traditionally attributed to Nicholas Udall, but in 1933, Gustave Scheurweghs – later editor of Udall's comedy Ralph Roister Doister – argued that Philip Nichols was the author. His argument was accepted by virtually all subsequent scholars. However, it has been demonstrated that the true author was actually Nicholas Udall all along, since a surviving draft was written in Udall's handwriting.

== Works ==
- Philip Nichols, The copie of a letter sente to one maister Chrispyne (London: John Daye, 1548).
- Philip Nichols, Here begynneth a godly new story of .xii. men that moyses (by the co[m]maundement of god) sent to spye owt the land of canaan (London: William Hill, 1548). Reprinted in 1575.
