= Call a spade a spade =

Figurative expression

"Call a spade a spade" is a figurative expression. It refers to calling something "as it is"—that is, by its right or proper name, without "beating about the bush", but rather speaking truthfully, frankly, and directly about a topic; even to the point of bluntness or rudeness, and even if the subject is considered coarse, impolite, or unpleasant.

The idiom originates in the classical Greek of Plutarch's Apophthegmata Laconica, and was introduced into the English language in 1542 in Nicolas Udall's translation of the Apophthegmes, where Erasmus had seemingly replaced Plutarch's images of "trough" and "fig" with the more familiar "spade". It has appeared in many literary and popular works, including those of Oscar Wilde, Charles Dickens, Ralph Waldo Emerson, W. Somerset Maugham, and Jonathan Swift.

== Definition ==
"Call a spade a spade" or "call a spade a shovel" are both forms of the figurative expression which state that the speaker should call, or has called, a noun by its most suitable name without any reservation to the strained formalities that may result. The implication is telling the truth regarding the nature of the thing in question, speaking frankly and directly about it, even if it is considered coarse, impolite, or unpleasant. Brewer's Dictionary of Phrase and Fable defines it in 1913 as being "outspoken, blunt, even to the point of rudeness", adding that it implies calling "things by their proper names without any 'beating about the bush'".

=== Usage ===
Brewer's Dictionary of Phrase and Fable in 1913, provides a definition largely consistent with contemporary English usage in the early 21st century. The Oxford English Dictionary records a forceful, obscene variant, "to call a spade a bloody shovel", attested since 1919.

Robert Burton used the idiom in his The Anatomy of Melancholy (1621) to describe his ostensibly plain writing style, claiming, "I call a spade a spade" (1.17.23). The phrase also appeared in Joseph Devlin's book How to Speak and Write Correctly (1910) to satirize speakers who chose their words to show superiority: "For instance, you may not want to call a spade a spade. You may prefer to call it a spatulous device for abrading the surface of the soil. Better, however, to stick to the old familiar, simple name that your grandfather called it." Oscar Wilde uses the phrase in his novel The Picture of Dorian Gray (1890), when the character Lord Henry Wotton remarks: "It is a sad truth, but we have lost the faculty of giving lovely names to things. The man who could call a spade a spade should be compelled to use one. It is the only thing he is fit for." Wilde uses it again in The Importance of Being Earnest (1895). Other authors who have used it in their works include Charles Dickens, Ralph Waldo Emerson, Robert Browning, Jonathan Swift, and W. Somerset Maugham.

The phrase predates the use of the word "spade" as an ethnic slur against African Americans (and others of African descent), which was not recorded until 1928.

The equivalent expression in Spanish-speaking countries is "a llamar al pan pan, y al vino vino", which translates as "to call the bread bread, and to call the wine wine". Italian has a similar expression to the Spanish "dire pane al pane e vino al vino", literally "to say bread to the bread and wine to the wine". The equivalent in French-speaking countries is "appeler un chat, un chat", which translates as "to call a cat a cat". In Portuguese-speaking countries, the equivalent is "chamar os bois pelos nomes", literally, "to call oxen by their names" (a double-entendre; an "ox" can also refer to a cornuted man, a cuckold).

== History ==
The ultimate source of this idiom is a phrase in Plutarch's Apophthegmata Laconica: τὴν σκάφην σκάφην λέγοντας (tēn skaphēn skaphēn legontas). The word σκαφη (skaphe) means "basin" or "trough". Lucian De Hist. Conscr. (41) has τὰ σύκα σύκα, τὴν σκάφην δὲ σκάφην ὀνομάσων (ta suka suka, tēn skaphēn de skaphēn onomasōn), "calling a fig a fig, and a trough a trough".

Erasmus translated Plutarch's σκαφην (skaphe), as if from σπάθη (spáthe), as ligo "shovel" in his Apophthegmatum opus. Lakshmi Gandhi speculates that the introduction of the word "shovel" may have been a conscious, dramatic choice rather than a mistranslation.

The phrase was introduced to English in 1542 in Nicolas Udall's translation of Erasmus's work, Apophthegmes, that is to saie, prompte saiynges. First gathered by Erasmus:

Philippus aunswered, that the Macedonians wer feloes of no fyne witte in their termes but altogether grosse, clubbyshe, and rusticall, as they whiche had not the witte to calle a spade by any other name than a spade.

In the expression, the word spade refers to the instrument used to move earth; a very common tool. The same word was used in England, Scandinavia, and in the Netherlands; Erasmus's country of origin.

== See also ==
- The dictionary definition of call a spade a spade at Wiktionary
- A rose by any other name would smell as sweet
- Duck test
- Calling a deer a horse
- Rectification of names
- Political correctness
