= Nicholas Udall =

English playwright, cleric and schoolmaster (1504–1556)

Nicholas Udall (or Uvedale Udal, Woodall, or other variations) (1504 – 23 December 1556) was an English playwright, cleric, schoolmaster, the author of Ralph Roister Doister, generally regarded as the first comedy written in the English language.

== Biography ==
Udall was born in Southampton and educated at Winchester College, then at Corpus Christi College, Oxford, where he held a scholarship. In 1524 he was elected a probationer fellow and probably took his B.A. He was tutored under the guidance of Thomas Cromwell, who mentions him in a letter to John Creke of 17 August 1523 as 'Maister Woodall'.

In 1527/1528, Udall was in trouble with his college for having or reading heretical books, but he was allowed to remain in college. In 1533 he was a schoolmaster at a grammar school in London.

In 1534 Udall took the degree of M.A. and was appointed headmaster of Eton College. He appears in Cromwell's accounts for 1535 as 'Nicholas Woodall Master of Eton'. He taught Latin at Eton and was headmaster there until 1541, when he was forced to leave after being convicted of offences against his pupils under the Buggery Act 1533. The felony of buggery, like all felonies in England and Wales in the 16th century, was punished by default (but subject to exemptions) by loss of lands and goods and capital punishment by hanging. Udall, however, wrote an impassioned plea to his old friends from Cromwell's household Thomas Wriothesley and Sir Ralph Sadler, then joint king's Secretaries, and his sentence was commuted to imprisonment for just under a year, which he served in the Marshalsea. The boys in question were not prosecuted. A former pupil, the poet Thomas Tusser, later claimed that Udall had flogged him without cause.

An adherent of the Reformed Church of England, Udall flourished under Edward VI and survived into the reign of the Roman Catholic Mary I. In 1547, he became Vicar of Braintree, in 1551 of Calborne, Isle of Wight, and in 1554 returned to teaching as headmaster of Westminster School.

Udall died in 1556 and was buried in the churchyard of St Margaret's, Westminster. No monumental inscription can now be traced.

== Works ==
Udall translated part of the Apophthegms by Erasmus, and translated in part and oversaw the English version of the Paraphrases of Erasmus, published in 1548 as The first tome or volume of the Paraphrase of Erasmus vpon the newe testamente. Other works he translated were Pietro Martire's Discourse on the Eucharist and Thomas Gemini's Anatomia. His most famous work, the play Ralph Roister Doister, was probably presented to Queen Mary as an entertainment around 1553, but not published until 1566.

With John Leland, he wrote a number of songs in Latin and English for pageants marking the coronation of Anne Boleyn on 31 May 1533, using his Latinized name "Udallus". In the same year, he published Flovres for Latine Spekynge, a collection of material from his comedy and works by the Roman poet Terence put together for his pupils.

Udall wrote a propaganda tract in response to the Prayer Book Rebellion in 1549, An Answer to the Articles of the Commoners of Devonshire and Cornwall Declaring to the Same How they have been Seduced by Evil Persons. (Note: In contemporary spelling and typesetting: "An answer to the articles of the comoners of Deuonshere and Cornewall declaring to the same howe they haue ben sedused by Euell persons".) This tract has sometimes been wrongly attributed to Philip Nichols.

It has been argued that Udall is the author of the dramatic interlude Respublica, which was acted before Queen Mary in 1553.

== In literature ==
In Ford Madox Ford's trilogy of historical novels The Fifth Queen, the character Magister Nicholas Udal is a decidedly heterosexual profligate, who serves as Latin tutor to Princess Mary and to Henry VIII's fifth queen, Catherine Howard. He defends himself against charges that he was "thrown out of his mastership at Eton for his foul living" by claiming that he, a Protestant, "was undone by Papist lies."
