= Ecclesiastes of Erasmus =

Book by Erasmus of Rotterdam

Ecclesiastes: On the Art of Preaching (Latin: Ecclesiastes: sive de ratione concionandi) was a 1535 book by Desiderius Erasmus. One of the last major works he produced, Ecclesiastes focuses on the subject of effective preaching. Previously, Erasmus had written treatises on the Christian layperson, Christian prince, and Christian educator. Friends and admirers, including Bishop John Fisher suggested that Erasmus write on the office of the Christian priesthood. He began writing the text in 1523, finally completing and printing Ecclesiastes in 1535.

== Sections ==
Ecclesiastes is divided into four sections, but Erasmus himself declares that those sections cover three themes. Section one is a discussion of the value of the office of priest, and the qualities that an effective preacher exemplifies and cultivates. Sections two and three are a review of rhetorical devices that a good preacher should have in their repertoire. Erasmus believed that a priest should have a solid background in homiletics and hermeneutics in order to properly interpret scripture, and construct effective sermons on that interpretation. The fourth section is a resource bank of topics worthy of sermons, and scriptural references to draw from. This section is filled with practical examples and illustrations.

The work was sixteen years in the writing, and is largely based on Quintilian’s Institutio Oratoria, but also uses some ideas from Melanchthon's Elementa Rhetorices (1531).

== Combination, not separation ==
In the Ecclesiastes, Erasmus combines things that many contemporary religious figures vehemently wanted to separate. He advocated that priests combine historical and metaphorical interpretations of the Bible. For Erasmus, the metaphorical interpretation was built upon the historical biblical tradition, not opposed to it. He also was a proponent of priests using the classical rhetorical tradition to supplement their ability to deliver sermons and serve their laity.

== Role of the preacher ==
According to the Ecclesiastes, the role of the preacher is to bring peace to the individual souls of the congregation. Priests bring that peace primarily through the teachings of Christ, and by encouraging their congregation to live their daily lives by those principles. The purpose of the sermon then is to effect a tangible change in their audience; to improve human conduct. The priest learns a heavenly doctrine, transfers that knowledge into a better earthly life through the congregation, thereby affecting a right and peaceful relationship with God.

== Humor ==
At the time when he wrote Ecclesiastes, Erasmus was nearing the end of his life, and his health was failing him. This did not prevent him from producing a cogent and influential treatise on preaching, nor did it prevent him from sprinkling in some of his trademark humor. He writes: "If elephants can be trained to dance, lions to play and leopards to hunt, surely priests can be taught to preach."

== Influence ==
It is difficult to gauge exactly how influential the Ecclesiastes was in the reform of preaching. It was certainly a popular text, going through four editions in the year between its first publishing and the death of Erasmus in 1536. "By 1545 there were as many as thirty-six hundred copies of the text in circulation."

According to Jesuit historian John O'Malley, it was "the longest, most learned, and most comprehensive study of the theory and practice of preaching published up to that time. It was a landmark work that drove out of existence the medieval works on preaching, the artes praedicandi."

Erasmus proposed in the Ecclesiastes that the Church institute a competence training program. Bishops would train priests in the arts of rhetoric, weeding out the poor speakers and instilling the proper tools and traits needed to speak effectively: preachers needed to be thoroughly versed in the scriptures. Erasmus was not the only figure at the time to voice similar concerns, but the Council of Trent did refer to the Ecclesiastes and used its thought while implementing reforms.
