= Julius Excluded from Heaven =

1514 dialogue, commonly attributed to Erasmus

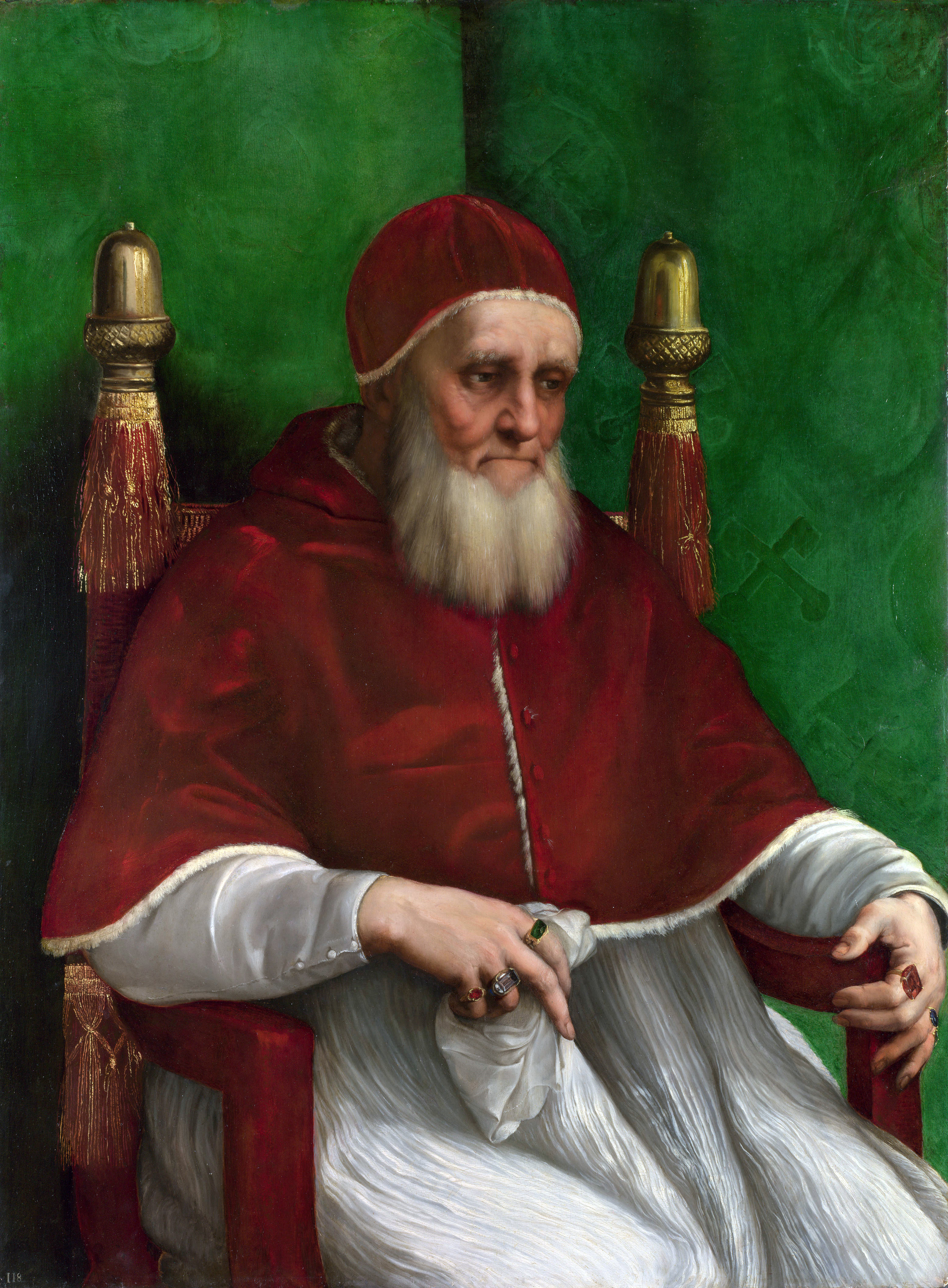
Pope Julius II

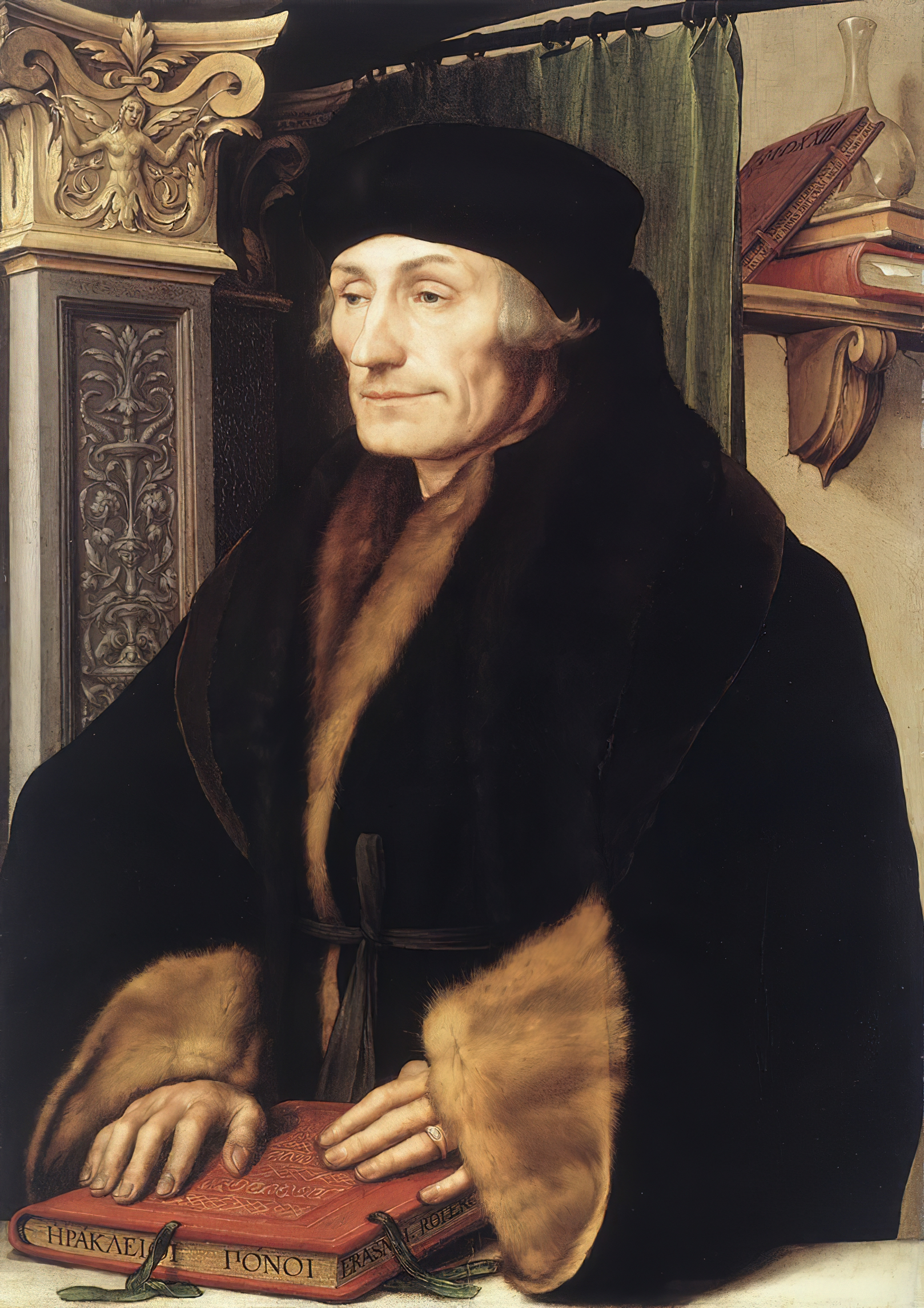
Desiderius Erasmus

Julius Excluded from Heaven (Latin: Iulius exclusus e coelis, IE) is a satirical dialogue that was written in 1514, commonly attributed to the Dutch humanist and theologian Desiderius Erasmus. It involves Pope Julius II, who died a year earlier, trying to persuade Saint Peter to allow him to enter Heaven by using the same tactics he applied when alive. The dialogue is also supplemented by a "Genius" (his guardian angel) who makes wry comments about the pope and his deeds.

== Plot ==
The dialogue begins with a drunken Pope Julius II trying to open the gate of heaven with the key to his secret money-chest. He is accompanied by his Genius, his guardian angel. Behind him are the soldiers who died in his military campaigns, whom he promised would go to heaven regardless of their deeds. Peter denies him passage, even when Julius threatens him with his army and papal bulls of excommunication, and when this fails, questions what right Peter has to deny him when he did not accomplish half of what Julius did in his own life. Peter is indifferent to such boasting, so Julius then goes into a lengthy explanation of his deeds and justifies his sins, ranging from simony to pederasty, with the fact that the pope has the authority to excuse any sin. Seeing that Julius is incapable of remorse, Peter drives him and his army away from Heaven. The dialogue ends with Julius plotting to create his own paradise, from which he intends to eventually conquer Heaven.

== Authorship ==
Erasmus's friend, the English diplomatist Richard Pace, obliquely claimed authorship in his 1517 book De fructu. However Erasmus is usually credited as the author of the dialogue despite vehemently denying it.

Erasmus and many of his circle were scandalized by Julius II: he did not embody the characteristics of a vicar of Christ. Erasmus believed Julius' election was likely invalid due to simony. He was shocked by Julius II's personal leadership of armies in full armour and what he felt was the work of a worldly, unscrupulous and ambitious man. These thoughts were clearly implied in his more famous satirical work, The Praise of Folly.

The Erasmus-authorship theory sometimes has it that a first draft of the IE was provided to Thomas Lupset by Erasmus in summer 1514. Lupset then left for Rome with the IE, where Ulrich von Hutten got hold of the IE and copied it.

In a letter of 1519, Erasmus admitted to Cardinal Lorenzo Campeggio that he was in possession of the IE five years ago, which would mean at the time of the earliest knowledge of it. He sometimes implied that he did not write it, but modern scholarship generally overrides this with supposed internal evidence, lack of a credible alternative author when the copies of Bonifacius Amerbach of 1516 and one of von Hutten are examined against each other. Thomas More writes in a letter on 15 December 1516 that he has gotten hold of a copy of the dialogue in Erasmus' handwriting, and asks Erasmus what to do with it. It is thought that Erasmus made evasive comments to avoid losing allies and to avoid retribution from his enemies and the Inquisition.

The dialogue was very popular and was reprinted many times in pamphlets. It was praised by Martin Luther to be "so learned, and so ingenious, that is, so entirely Erasmian, that it makes the reader laugh at the vices of the church, over which every true Christian ought rather to groan."

== Editions ==
Ulrich von Hutten is described as one of the main promoters of Erasmus authorship and also to be responsible for the print of its first edition in 1517. According to Helmut Claus, Peter Schöffer the Youngers printshop was the location of its print, but Schöffer omitted both his name and the printshops location.

== Literary precedents ==
Classical precedents include Seneca's satire Apocolocyntosis and Roman Emperor Julian's satire The Caesars, both of which involve Roman gods vetting emperors who wish to enter or join the pantheon. Erasmus had referred to the Seneca piece before the death of Julius and included it into his collected works of Seneca edition: Oxford University had three manuscripts of the Seneca at the time.
