= Ralph Roister Doister =

Sixteenth-century play by Nicholas Udall

- Original language: English
- Written by: Nicholas Udall
- Characters: Ralph Roister Doister; Matthew Merrygreeke; Dobinet Doughty; Harpax; Christian Custance; Madge Mumblecrust; Tibet Talkapace; Annot Alyface; Trupenny; Gawyn Goodluck; Tristram Trustie; Sym Suresby; Scrivener
- Genre: Comedy
- Setting: London

Premiere
- Date: 1550s
- Place: London

Ralph Roister Doister is a sixteenth-century play by Nicholas Udall, which was once regarded as the first comedy to be written in the English language.

The date of its composition is often disputed, but the balance of opinion suggests that it was written in about 1552, when Udall was a schoolmaster in London, and some theorise the play was intended for public performance by his pupils—who were all male, as were most actors in that period. The work was not published until 1567, 11 years after its author's death.

== Sources ==
Roister Doister seems to have been inspired by the works of Plautus and Terence. The title character is a variation on the "Braggart Soldier" archetype, but with the innovation of a parasitic tempter which stems from the morality play tradition. By combining the structures, conventions, and styles of the ancient Greek and Roman comedies with English theatrical traditions and social types (especially the relatively new and burgeoning English middle classes), Udall was able to establish a new form of English comedy, leading directly through to Shakespeare and beyond. The play blends the stock plot-elements and stock characters of the ancient Greek and Roman theatre with those of chivalric literature and the English mediaeval theatre.

== Plot ==
The play is written in five acts. The plot of the play centres on a rich widow, Christian Custance, who is betrothed to Gawyn Goodluck, a merchant. Ralph Roister Doister is encouraged throughout by a con-man trickster figure (Matthew Merrygreeke) to woo Christian Custance, but his pompous attempts do not succeed. Ralph then tries with his friends and servants (at Merrygreek's behest) to break in and take Christian Custance by force, but they are defeated by her maids and run away. The merchant Gawyn arrives shortly after, and the play concludes happily with reconciliation, a prayer and a song.

== Characters ==
- Ralph Roister Doister
- Mathew Merygreeke
- Gawyn Goodluck, affianced to Dame Custance
- Tristram Trustie, his friend
- Dobinet Doughtie, servant to Roister Doister
- Tom Trupenie, servant to Dame Custance
- Sym Suresby, servant to Goodluck
- Scrivener
- Harpax, servant to Roister Doister
- Dame Christian Custance, a widow
- Margerie Mumblecrust, her nurse
- Tibet Talkapace, her maid
- Annot Alyface, her maid

== Performance history ==
Readings and stagings of the play have taken place throughout the 20th century, notably a 1910 production by the Philolexian Society of Columbia University and a 1953 presentation by Oxford University students at the Edinburgh Festival. Three adaptations of the play appeared in the 1930s, 1960s, and 1980s.

== Sources ==
- Chislett, William Jr. 1914. "The Sources of Ralph Roister Doister." Modern Language Notes 29:6 (June): 166–167.
- Hartley, Anthony. 1954. The Spectator Performing Arts section, 3 September 1954: 10. Web.
- Hinton, James. 1913. "The Source of Ralph Roister Doister." Modern Philology 11:2 (Oct.): 273–278.
- Norland, Howard B. 1995. Drama in Early Tudor Britain, 1485-1558. Lincoln: University of Nebraska Press.
- O'Brien, Angela. 2004. Ralph Roister Doister: The First Regular English Comedy.
- Partridge, Matthew. 2015. "Review: Ralph Roister Doister." Remotegoat, 25 February 2015. Web. Review: Ralph Roister Doister ****
- Plumstead, A. W. 1963. "Satirical Parody in Roister Doister: A Reinterpretation." Studies in Philology 60:2 (April): 141–154.
- Wickham, Glynne, ed. 1976. English Moral Interludes. London: Dent. ISBN 0-874-71766-3.
- Wickham, Glynne. 1981. Early English Stages: 1300—1660. Vol. 3. London: Routledge. ISBN 0-710-00218-1.
