= Apophthegmatum opus =

Translation by Erasmus of Rotterdam

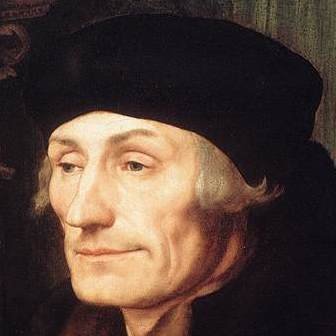
The creator, Erasmus

Apophthegmatum opus is a translation of Plutarch's Apophthegmata by Erasmus of Rotterdam, a collection of apophthegms from classical antiquity. Many classical apophthegms repeated ideas of Socrates, Plato, and Alexander the Great. According to Speroni, Apophthegmatum opus is one of "the most monumental collections of classical apophthegms… ever assembled…" Here are a few samples of Erasmus' apophthegms:

While on the march with his army one winter, Alexander the Great was sitting by a campfire, watching the army as it marched by. He noticed an old warrior shivering from the cold, trying to find a place near the fire. Alexander bade the man sit in his own chair, saying, "If you had been born a Persian, it would cost you your head to sit in the king's chair, but you are a Macedonian, not a Persian. Sit."

Metellus once accused Cicero of having caused more people to die through his personal testimony than he had saved through his representing them in court. Cicero responded, "Indeed, for my integrity exceeds my eloquence."

A certain young gentleman who had come to Rome from the provinces was found to bear an astonishing resemblance to Augustus Caesar. Hearing this, Augustus had the man brought before him. Perceiving the close resemblance, Augustus asked him, "Tell me, did your mother ever spend any time in Rome?" The quick-witted provincial shot back, "My mother, never; my father, often."

One of Socrates' lessons was that men should abstain from foods that might provoke a man to eat when he has no hunger, and drinks that might provoke him to drink when he has no thirst. He went on to say that the best sauce in the world is to be hungry.

== Published editions ==
- The Apophthegmes of Erasmus, Translated into English by Nicolas Udall; Literally Reprinted from the Scarce Edition of 1564. Boston, Lincolnshire: Robert Roberts. 1877 – via Internet Archive.
