= Porson (typeface) =

Greek typeface

Porson is an influential typeface in the Greek alphabet based on the handwriting of the English classicist Richard Porson.

== Creation ==
Porson was a classicist with very careful Greek handwriting. His biographer wrote that he "excelled ... in writing with neatness and beauty" and "wrote notes on the margins of books with such studied accuracy that they rivalled print".

The punchcutter Richard Austin was commissioned by the Cambridge University Press to cut a type based on his handwriting, probably from 1806 onwards. It was cast by the Caslon foundry, but it never appeared in their specimens, seemingly as the type was proprietary to Cambridge. It was completed and used only after Porson's death in 1808, seemingly first in 1809 and more in 1810.

== Legacy ==
After its first appearance, it was soon copied by other founders. By the end of the 19th century, it has become the predominant Greek type used in Britain, with Victor Scholderer's New Hellenic typeface (favored by Cambridge University Press) the only notable exception. A version was released by Monotype for hot metal typesetting with some changes in 1912.

The standard model for Greek typefaces from the 1540s until the mid-eighteenth century was the Grecs du roi type cut by Claude Garamond and its many imitations from other punchcutters, also known as "Old Style". However, by the mid-eighteenth century tastes in handwriting had changed. Comparing with Greek types used previous to it, Porson is characterized by its simplified forms and its abandonment of the many ligatures and alternative forms historically popular when writing Greek.

It has been described as "calm yet energetic", and was used by the Oxford Classical Texts for over a century. John Bowman describes it as "the single most important contribution to Greek type design in Britain" and two designs based on it from the Figgins foundry as "the most beautiful Greek type ever".

An open-source digitisation has been published by the Greek Font Society.
