= Minuscule 440 =

- New Testament manuscript
- Text: New Testament (except Rev.)
- Date: 12th century
- Script: Greek
- Now at: Cambridge University Library
- Size: 19 cm by 14 cm
- Type: Western text-type (in Acts)
- Category: none
- Note: marginalia

Minuscule 440 (in the Gregory-Aland numbering), δ 260 (in the Soden numbering), is a Greek minuscule manuscript of the New Testament, on parchment. Palaeographically it has been assigned to the 12th century. The marginal equipment is almost complete.

== Description ==
The codex contains a complete text of the New Testament except Book of Revelation on 294 parchment leaves (19 cm by 14 cm) with only one lacunae. It is written in one column per page, in 28-30 lines per page.

The text is divided according to the κεφαλαια (chapters), whose numbers are given at the margin, and their τιτλοι (titles of chapters) at the top of the pages. There is also a division according to the Ammonian Sections (in Mark 240 Sections, the last in 16:19), without references to the Eusebian Canons.

It contains the Eusebian Canon tables, pictures, lectionary equipment at the margin, Prolegomena to Catholic and Pauline epistles, and subscriptions in Paul. The Synaxarion, Menologion were added by a later hand.

The order of books: Gospels, Acts, Catholic epistles, and Pauline epistles.

== Text ==
The Greek text of the codex is a mixture of text-types. In Book of Acts it is a representative of the Western text-type. Kurt Aland did not place it in any Category. According to the Claremont Profile Method it represents the textual family K^{x} in Luke 1 and Luke 20. In Luke 10 it has a mixture of Byzantine families. It has some relationship to Π groups.

It has some unique readings.

1 Corinthians 2:14 it reads πνευματος (omit του θεου) along with 2, 216, 255, 330, 451, 823, 1827, and syr^{p}.

== History ==
The manuscript once belonged to Bishop Moore (together with the codex 60), who gave it in 1715 to the library. It was examined by Bentley, Mill, and Griesbach. The manuscript was added to the list of New Testament manuscripts by Scholz (1794-1852). C. R. Gregory saw it in 1883.

The codex is cited in critical editions of the Greek New Testament (NA26).

It is currently housed at the Cambridge University Library (Mm. 6.9) in Cambridge.

== See also ==
- List of New Testament minuscules
- Biblical manuscript
- Textual criticism
