= Greek Font Society =

The Greek Font Society (Greek: Εταιρεία Ελληνικών Τυπογραφικών Στοιχείων) is a non-profit organization in Greece, founded in 1992, devoted to improving the standard of Greek digital typography.

It has issued four digital fonts, all with full polytonic support:

- GFS Bodoni, a modernized version of Giambattista Bodoni's 1793 design.
- GFS Didot, inspired by Firmin Didot's 1805 design.
- GFS Neohellenic, cut by the Lanston Monotype Company.
- GFS Porson, originally created by Richard Porson from Cambridge, at the end of the 18th century.

Other fonts include:

- GFS Complutum
- GFS Bodoni Classic
- GFS Baskerville
- GFS Gazis
- GFS Didot Classic
- GFS Porson
- GFS Solomos
- GFS Olga
- GFS Neohellenic
- GFS Artemisia
- GFS Theokritos
- GFS Elpis
- GFS Göschen

The society has been quite prolific in the creation of new fonts. It sponsored an international symposium on the Greek alphabet and Greek typography in 1995. For the 2004 Summer Olympics in Athens, it designed and published an edition of the 14 Olympian Odes of Pindar using historic Greek typefaces. The majority of its fonts are licensed under the SIL Open Font License.

TeX versions of the following typefaces are also available: GFS Didot TeX, GFS Bodoni TeX, GFS NeoHellenic TeX, GFS Porson TeX and GFS Artemisia TeX.

A notable recent addition is the GFS Neohellenic Math OpenType font (George Matthiopoulos, Antonis Tsolomitis and others), which may be the only sans-serif math typeface currently (spring 2018) available (freely or otherwise) for use with XeTeX and LuaTeX as well as OpenType-compatible software such as LibreOffice.
