= British Library, Harley MS 1775 =

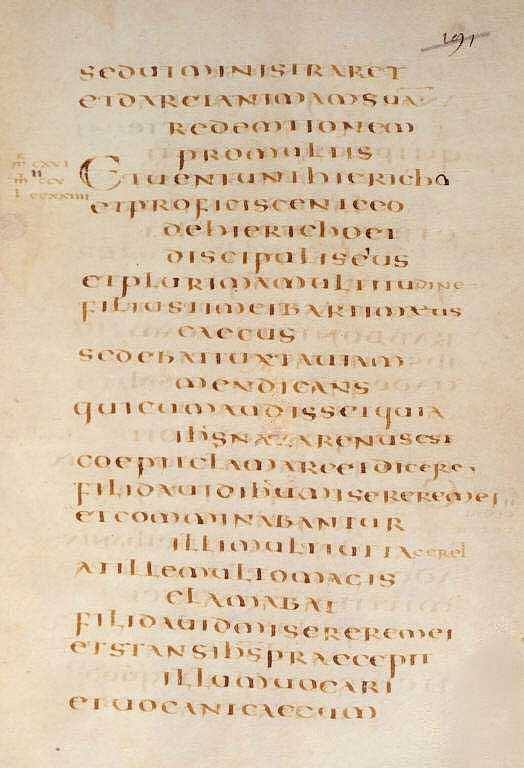
Folio 193 of British Library, Harley MS 1775, Gospel of Mark 10:45-49.

British Library, Harley MS 1775 is an illuminated Gospel Book produced in Italy during the last quarter of the 6th century. The text is in Latin and is a mixture of the Vulgate and Old Latin translations. This text is called "source Z" in critical studies of the Latin New Testament.

It is written in an uncial text with the running titles written in rustic capitals. The manuscript has enlarged initials and the opening lines of major text divisions are written in red. There are contemporary corrections in slanting uncial script which employ a Greek syllabification similar to that used by Victor of Capua.

There are 468 vellum folios that are 177 by 120 mm. The text is written in a single column of 130 by 85 mm. Each Gospel is started on a new quire. The quires are numbered so as to aid in the assembly of the codex.

The manuscript's decoration includes eighteen canon tables under architectural arcades, display capitals, and a colophon decoration. There is a nineteenth canon table that is more simply decorated.

On folio 11 there are Tironian notes in a 9th-century French hand. The manuscript was owned by Cardinal Mazarin (d. 1668). In the early 18th century it was in the French Royal Library. It was stolen along with several other manuscripts in 1707 by Jean Aymon. It was purchased in Holland by Robert Harley, 1st Earl of Oxford (d. 1724). It was sold by the widow of Edward Harley, 2nd Earl of Oxford and their daughter to Parliament as part of the Harley Collection which was one of the founding collections of the British Museum.

== See also ==
- List of New Testament Latin manuscripts
