= Minuscule 60 =

- New Testament manuscript
- Text: Gospels †
- Date: 1297
- Script: Greek
- Now at: Cambridge University Library
- Size: 20.5 cm by 14.5 cm
- Type: Byzantine text-type
- Category: V
- Hand: elegantly written
- Note: marginalia

Minuscule 60 (in the Gregory-Aland numbering), ε 1321 (Von Soden), is a Greek minuscule manuscript of the New Testament, on parchment leaves. It is dated by a colophon to the year 1297. It has complex contents, marginalia are incomplete.

== Description ==
The codex contains complete text of the four Gospels and Revelation on 291 leaves (size 20.5 cm by 14.5 cm). The text is written elegantly in one column per page, 24-26 lines per page.

The text is divided according to κεφαλαια (chapters), whose numbers are given at the margin, and their τιτλοι (titles of chapters) at the top of the pages. The text is also divided into the Ammonian Sections, but curiously no references to the Eusebian Canons on a margin of the text.

It contains the Epistula ad Carpianum, the Eusebian Tables, tables of the κεφαλαια (tables of contents) before each Gospel, subscriptions at the end of each Gospel, and pictures. It has a few scholia from Arethas.

Together with the codex 2821 it belongs to the same manuscript. Folios 4-294 belong to the codex 60, folios 295-316 – to the codex 2821.

== Text ==
The Greek text of the codex is a representative of the Byzantine text-type. Hermann von Soden classified it to the textual family K^{x}. Kurt Aland placed it in Category V. According to the Claremont Profile Method it represents textual cluster 1685, and it is closely related to K^{x}.

== History ==
Micheal ο μαντυλιδης wrote this manuscript for Georg τον μουγδουφον. The manuscript once belonged to Bishop Moore (along with minuscule 440), after his death in 1714 to King George I, who gave it to the Cambridge University.

It was examined by John Mill (as Moori 1), Richard Bentley (as o'), and Franz Delitzsch. C. R. Gregory saw it in 1886.

It is currently housed in at the Cambridge University Library (Dd. 9.69, fol. 4–294), at Cambridge.

== See also ==
- List of New Testament minuscules
- Biblical manuscript
- Textual criticism
