= British Library, Harley MS 3686 =

15th-century Venetian hand-written copy of Ptolemy's Geographia

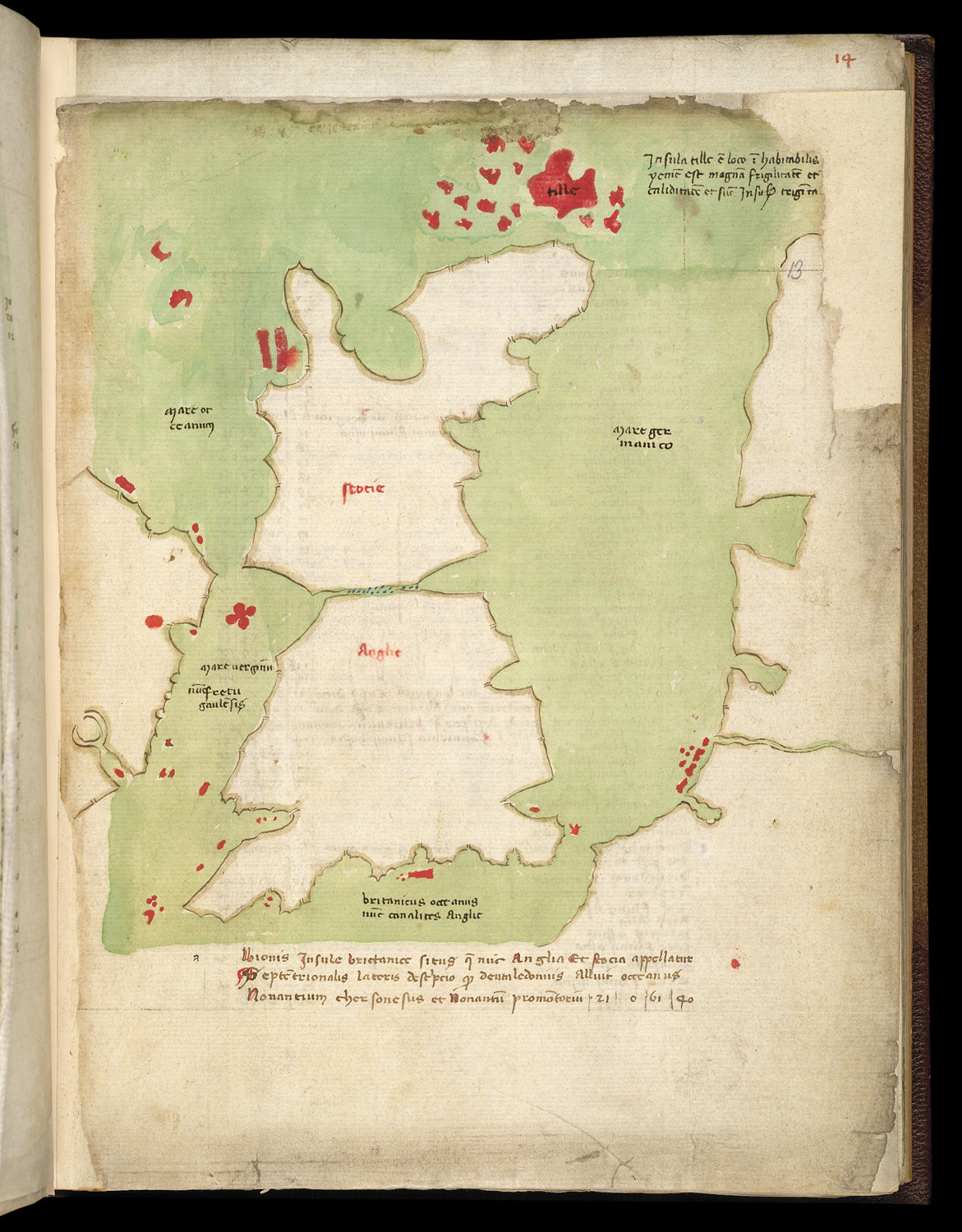
Harley MS 3686, folio 13; Map of Britain

Harley MS 3686 is an early 15th-century Venetian hand-written re-creation of Claudius Ptolemy’s Geographia. It is part of the Harleian Collection at the British Library.

== Description ==
Original 2nd-century versions of Geographia typically did not survive to the High Middle Ages; early Renaissance cartographers were working from copies of copies. Examination of the codex indicates the scribe of Harley MS 3686 was transcribing from an all-Latin copy. This codex is based on one of the few reprints that included the map sheets. Many other codices merely copied Book 1, which was text-only. Other scholarly sources indicate that it is near impossible to accurately create the maps from purely the text Ptolemy wrote describing how to produce the maps. Geographically focused codices with maps often garner broad interest while those codices without maps typically only interest historians of mathematics and cartography. Despite this supposed broad appeal, very little else is easily available about MS 3686. The codex currently resides in the British Library but there have been very few scholarly examinations of it. Even the most well-known surveys of Ptolemaic mapping, Nordenskiöld's Facsimile Atlas and Jesuit Priest Joseph Fisher's Claudii Ptolemaei Geographiae Codex Urbinas Graecus, do not include MS 3686.

Although lacking in a printing press or knowledge of the Western Hemisphere, the early 15th-century Europe had an economy providing navigational charts to mariners and scholarly reading material to persons with disposable income (but neither was in the vernacular language).

== Scribe ==
The scribe of Harley MS 3686 was probably a mapmaker (based on the quality of the freehand drawings and the obvious spelling errors indicative of someone who did not thoroughly understand Latin). The scribe likely drew from other classical and contemporary cartographic references, such as the writings of Pliny and another Ptolemaic codex written by Andrea Bianco in 1436. Scholars of Ptolemy's work in Florence were humanists; neither scholars in Genoa nor Naples used the same cartographic systems displayed in the codex. These facts and the close parallels to Venetian Andrea Bianco's work determine this unknown cartographer was also from Venice. The unknown Italian cartographer that created the MS 3686 codex did add some improvements to his maps beyond making an exact replica of the copy from which he drew. This practice follows the broad rediscovery in Europe of classical knowledge and its use as the foundation of contemporary study. The cartographer cross-referenced Ancient Latin place names for areas around the Mediterranean and Western Europe with contemporary equivalents. The author also provided place names to areas unknown in Ptolemy's era (such as areas around the Caspian Sea in Central Asia). Because of the author's apparent cartographic training, he redrew some of the maps to better conform to contemporary map-making practices. This codex improves on Ptolemy's equi-rectangular and orthographic projections but was written before the publication of the new Mercator projection; re-creating and improving Ptolemy's regional maps without attempting to create a world map. This codex displays depictions of Europe, North Africa, and the Levant superior to other contemporary codices such as the 1459 Mappa Mundi written by Venetian monk Mauro or the 1481 Wilczek-Brown Codex, both of which re-invent Geographia.

== Provenance ==
How this codex made its way from Venice to England is unclear but was probably due to the Mediterranean Sea-North Sea maritime trade of the 15th and 16th centuries. Robert Burscough owned the manuscript some time prior to his death. MS 3686 was sold by Burscough's widow in May 1715 to Robert Harley when it became part of his Harley's private collection. The collection in total passed through various members of the Harley family before being sold to the British Government by Margaret Bentinck, Duchess of Portland in 1753.
