= Walter Whiter =

English philologist and literary critic

The Reverend Walter Whiter (30 October 1758 in Birmingham, England– 23 July 1832 in Hardingham) was an English philologist and literary critic. He is known for his 1794 work A Specimen of a Commentary on Shakspeare. Specimen, which explored As You Like It in terms of John Locke's philosophy of associationism, has been described as the first work of literary criticism to use scientific psychology.

In addition to his literary criticism, Whiter published his etymological research, first as Etymologicon Magnum in 1800, then as Etymologicon Universale in 1822 (vol. 1 and 2) and 1825 (vol. 3); August Baron Merian, a correspondent of Samuel Butler, stated that he "pit(ied)" Whiter, and described him as "(a) great etymologist—perhaps the greatest that ever lived. A genius certainly; but it seems, like most eminent artists, dissolute."

Whiter's linguistic studies—in particular, his research into the language used by Gypsies—led him to be cited as a role model by George Borrow, to the extent that Whiter appears in Borrow's Lavengro as "Reverend Whiter the philologist". The book includes a song about his character, which goes as follows:

Give me the haunch of a buck to eat
And to drink Madeira old;
And a gentle wife to rest with,
And in my arms to fold.

An Arabic book to study,
A Norfolk cob to ride;
And a house to live in shaded by trees,
Near to a river's side.

With such good things around me,
And with good health withal,
Though I should live for a hundred years
For death I would not call.

For several decades, Whiter's notes on the vocabulary of Romani were thought to have been lost, but were rediscovered and published in 1909 as Whiter's 'Lingua Cingariana'.

== Personal life ==
Whiter was a friend of Richard Porson, who had a habit of adding marginalia to books which Whiter owned; many of these annotations were subsequently collected and published independently.
