= Richard Bentley =

English classical scholar, critic, and theologian (1662–1742)

The Reverend Richard Bentley FRS
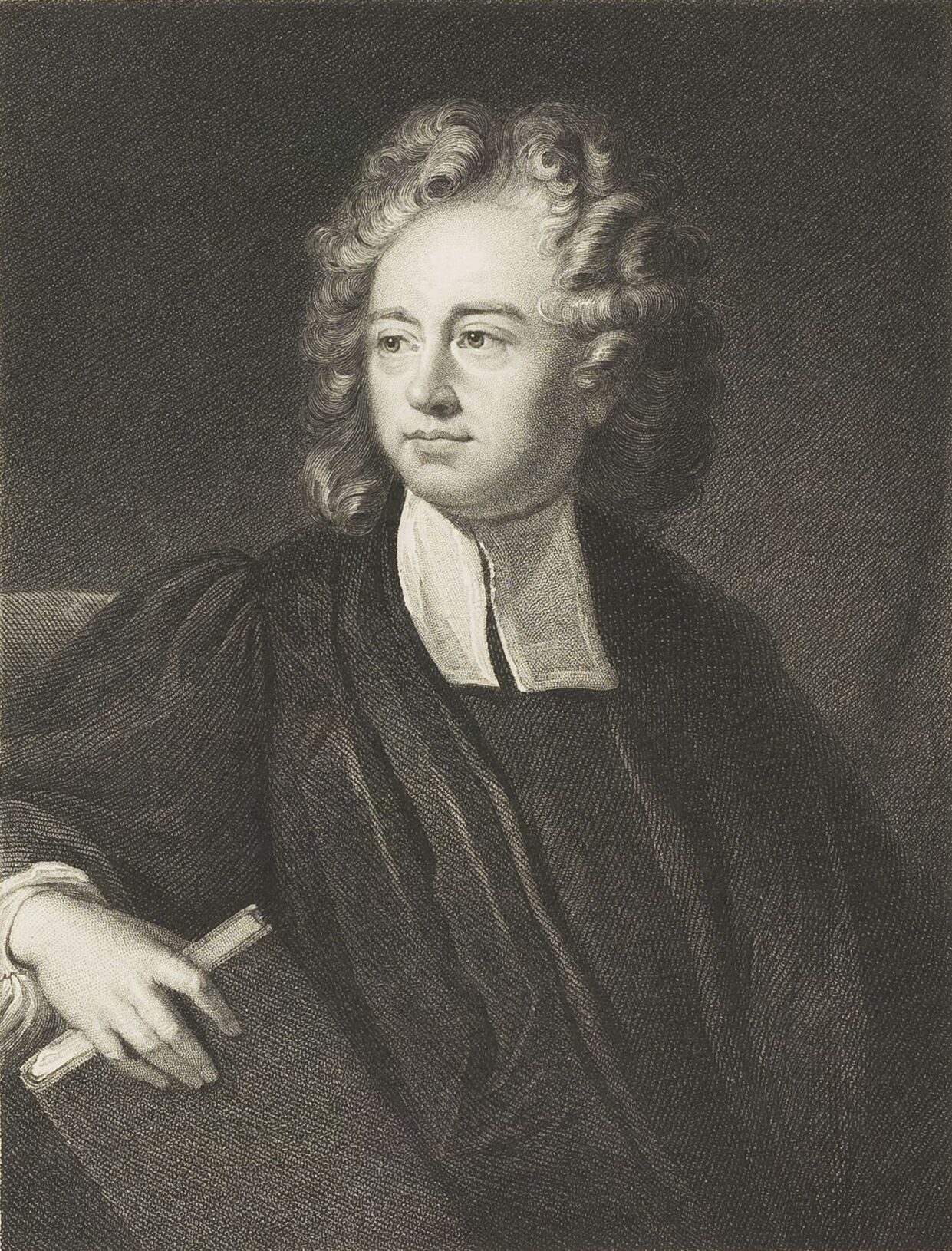
- Born: 27 January 1662; Oulton, Yorkshire, England
- Died: 14 July 1742 (aged 80); Cambridge, Cambridgeshire, England
- Occupations: Classical scholar; critic; cleric; theologian
- Known for: Bentley's paradox
- Title: Regius Professor of Divinity

Academic background
- Education: Queen Elizabeth Grammar School, Wakefield
- Alma mater: St John's College, Cambridge

Academic work
- Discipline: Classical philologist
- Institutions: Trinity College, Cambridge
- Notable students: James Jurin; Roger Cotes
- Influenced: A. E. Housman; Richard Porson

Richard Bentley (/ˈbɛntli/; 27 January 1662 – 14 July 1742) was an English classical scholar, critic, Anglican cleric, and theologian. Considered the "founder of historical philology", Bentley is widely credited with establishing the English school of Hellenism. In 1892, A. E. Housman called Bentley "the greatest scholar that England or perhaps that Europe ever bred".

Bentley's Dissertation upon the Epistles of Phalaris, published in 1699, proved that the letters in question, supposedly written in the 6th century BCE by the Sicilian tyrant Phalaris, were actually a forgery produced by a Greek sophist in the 2nd century CE. Bentley's investigation of the subject is still regarded as a landmark of textual criticism. He also showed that the sound represented in transcriptions of some Greek dialects by the letter digamma appeared also in Homeric poetry, even though it was not represented there in writing by any letter.

Bentley became Master of Trinity College, Cambridge in 1700. His autocratic manner and contemptuous treatment of the college fellows led to extensive controversy and litigation, but he remained in that post until his death, more than four decades later. In 1717 Bentley was appointed as the Regius Professor of Divinity at the University of Cambridge. As professor at Cambridge, Bentley introduced the first competitive written examinations in a Western university.

A fellow of the Royal Society, Bentley was interested in natural theology and the new physical sciences, subjects on which he corresponded with Isaac Newton. Bentley was in charge of the second edition of Newton's Principia Mathematica, although he delegated most of the scientific work involved to his pupil Roger Cotes.

== Early life and education ==
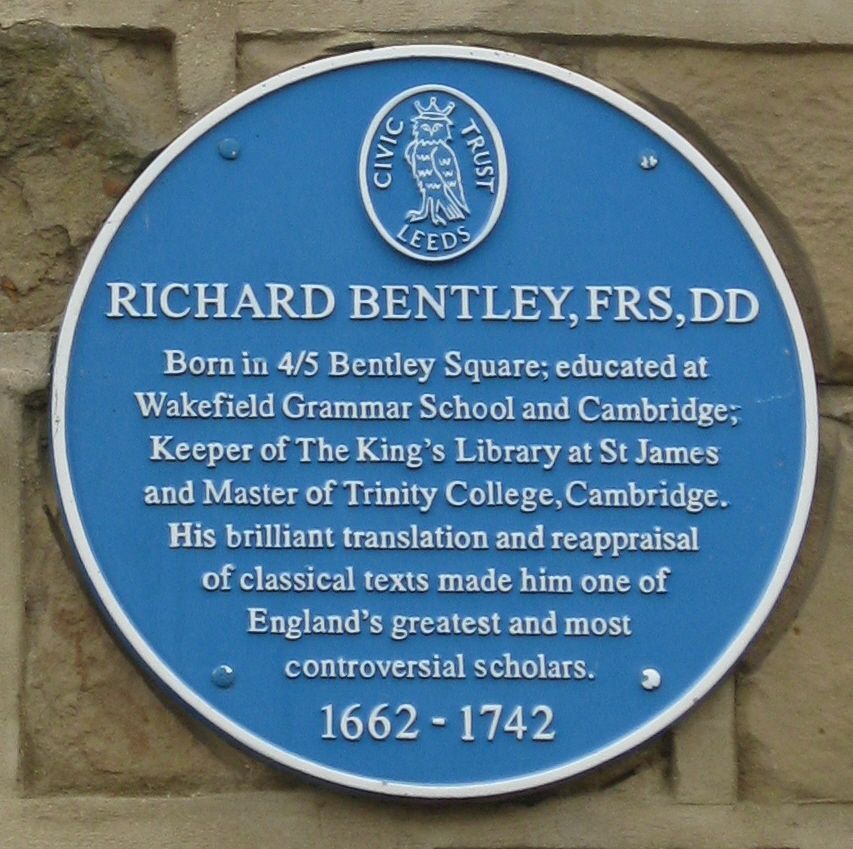
Plaque on Bentley Square, Oulton, West Yorkshire

Richard Bentley was born at his maternal grandparents' home at Oulton near Rothwell, Leeds, West Yorkshire, in northern England. A blue plaque near his birthplace commemorates the fact. His father was Thomas Bentley, a yeoman farmer of Oulton. His grandfather, Captain James Bentley, is said to have suffered for the Royalist cause following the English Civil War, leaving the family in reduced circumstances. Bentley's mother, the daughter of a stonemason, had some education, and was able to give her son his first lessons in Latin.

He attended a day school in Methley, before being sent to Queen Elizabeth Grammar School, Wakefield, where he was taught under the successive headmasters Jeremiah Boulton and John Baskerville, and is reported to have retained a strong affection for the school, later supporting former pupils from it. At the age of fourteen he left Wakefield to enter St John's College, Cambridge, matriculating on 24 May 1676; he received the degree of BA in 1680, when he was placed sixth in the list of mathematical honours (equivalent to third Wrangler under the system then in use), and proceeded MA in 1683.

== Academic work ==
Bentley never became a college fellow, which would have been the more natural course to an academic career. Instead, he was appointed headmaster of Spalding Grammar School before he was 21 years old. Edward Stillingfleet, the dean of St Paul's Cathedral in London, hired Bentley as tutor to his son. This allowed Bentley to meet eminent scholars, have access to the best private library in England, and become familiar with Dean Stillingfleet. During his six years as tutor, Bentley also made a comprehensive study of Greek and Latin writers, storing up knowledge which he would use later in his scholarship.

In 1689, Stillingfleet became bishop of Worcester and Bentley's pupil went up to Wadham College, Oxford, accompanied by his tutor. At Oxford, Bentley soon met John Mill, Humphrey Hody, and Edward Bernard. He studied the manuscripts of the Bodleian, Corpus Christi, and other college libraries. He collected material for literary studies. Among these are a corpus of the fragments of the Greek poets and an edition of the Greek lexicographers.

The Oxford (Sheldonian) press was about to bring out an edition (the editio princeps) from the unique manuscript of the Chronographia in the Bodleian Library. It was a universal history (down to AD 560) in Greek by John Malalas or "John the Rhetor" of Antioch (date uncertain, between 600 and 1000). The editor, John Mill, principal of St Edmund Hall, asked Bentley to review it and make any pertinent remarks on the text.

Bentley wrote the Epistola ad Johannem Millium, which is about a hundred pages long and was included at the end of the Oxford Malalas (1691). That short treatise placed Bentley ahead of all living English scholars. The ease with which he restored corrupted passages, the certainty of his emendation and command over the relevant material, are in a style totally different from the careful and laborious learning of Hody, Mill or Edmund Chilmead. To the small circle of classical students (lacking the great critical dictionaries of modern times), it was obvious that he was a critic beyond the ordinary.

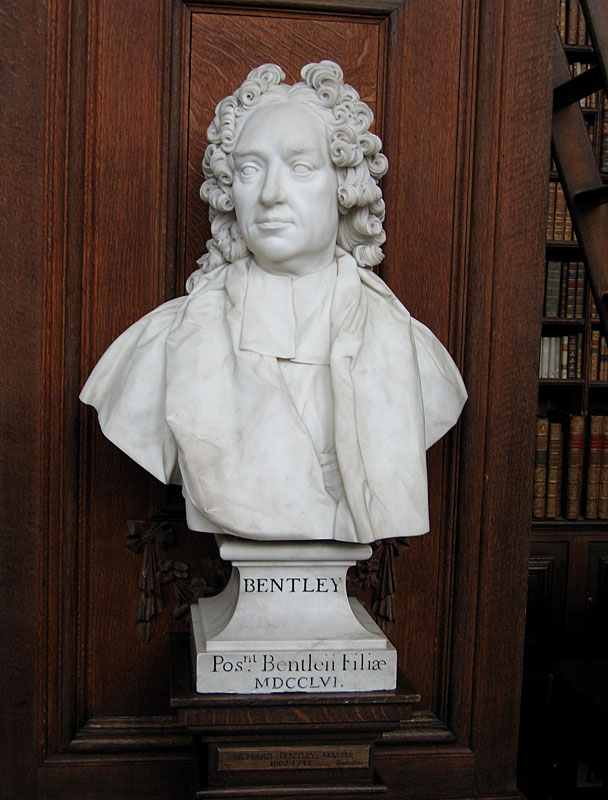
A bust of Bentley now stands in the library of Trinity College, Cambridge

In 1690, Bentley had taken deacon's orders. In 1692 he was nominated first Boyle lecturer, a nomination repeated in 1694. He was offered the appointment a third time in 1695 but declined it, as he was involved in too many other activities. In the first series of lectures ("A Confutation of Atheism"), he endeavours to present Newtonian physics in a popular form, and to frame them (especially in opposition to Hobbes) into a proof of the existence of an intelligent Creator. He had some correspondence with Newton, then living in Trinity College, Cambridge, on the subject. The second series, preached in 1694, has not been published and is believed to be lost.

After being ordained, Bentley was promoted to a prebendal stall in Worcester Cathedral. In 1693 the curator of the royal library became vacant, and his friends tried to obtain the position for Bentley, but did not have enough influence. The new librarian, a Mr Thynne, resigned in favour of Bentley, on condition that he receive an annuity of £130 for life out of the £200 salary. In 1695 Bentley received a royal chaplaincy and the living of Hartlebury.

That same year, he was elected a fellow of the Royal Society, and in 1696 earned the degree of Doctor of Divinity. The scholar Johann Georg Graevius of Utrecht made a dedication to him, prefixed to a dissertation on the seventeenth-century scholar Albert Rubens, De Vita Fl. Mallii Theodori (1694).

=== Dissertation on the Epistles of Phalaris ===
Bentley had official apartments in St James's Palace in London, and his first care was the royal library in Ashburnham House in Westminster. He worked to restore the collection from a dilapidated condition. He persuaded the Earl of Marlborough to ask for additional rooms in the palace for the books. This was granted, but Marlborough kept them for his personal use. Bentley enforced the law, ensuring that publishers delivered nearly one thousand volumes that had been purchased but not delivered.

The University of Cambridge commissioned Bentley to obtain Greek and Latin fonts for their classical books; he had these made in Holland. He assisted John Evelyn in his Numismata. Bentley did not settle down to the steady execution of any of the major projects he had started. In 1694, he designed an edition of Philostratus, but abandoned it to Gottfried Olearius (1672–1715), "to the joy," says F. A. Wolf, "of Olearius and of no one else." He supplied Graevius with collations of Cicero, and Joshua Barnes with a warning as to the spuriousness of the Epistles of Euripides. Barnes printed the epistles anyway and declared that no one could doubt their authenticity but a man who was perfrictae frontis aut judicii imminuti (boldfaced and lacking in judgment). For Graevius's Callimachus (1697), Bentley added a collection of the fragments with notes.

He wrote the Dissertation on the Epistles of Phalaris (1699), his major academic work, almost accidentally. In 1697, William Wotton, about to bring out a second edition of his Ancient and Modern Learning, asked Bentley to write out a paper exposing the spuriousness of the Epistles of Phalaris, long a subject of academic controversy. The Christ Church editor of Phalaris, Charles Boyle, resented Bentley's paper. He had already quarrelled with Bentley in trying to get the manuscript in the royal library collated for his edition (1695). Boyle wrote a response which was accepted by the reading public, although it was much later criticised as showing only superficial learning. The demand for Boyle's book required a second printing. When Bentley responded, it was with his dissertation. The truth of its conclusions was not immediately recognised, but it has a high reputation.

=== Master of Trinity College ===
In 1700, the commissioners of ecclesiastical patronage recommended Bentley to the Crown for the mastership of Trinity College, Cambridge. He arrived an outsider and proceeded to reform the college administration. He started a programme of renovations to the buildings, and used his position to promote learning. He is also credited by the British mathematician Rouse Ball with starting the first written examinations in the West in 1702, all those prior to this being oral in nature. At the same time, he antagonised the fellows, and the capital programme caused reductions in their incomes, which they resented.

After ten years of stubborn but ineffectual resistance, the fellows appealed to the Visitor, the bishop of Ely (John Moore). Their petition was full of general complaints. Bentley's reply (The Present State of Trinity College, etc., 1710) is in his most crushing style. The fellows amended their petition and added a charge of Bentley's having committed 54 breaches of the statutes. Bentley appealed directly to the Crown, and backed his application with a dedication of his Horace to the lord treasurer (Harley).

The Crown lawyers decided against him; the case was heard (1714) and a sentence of expulsion from the mastership was drawn up. Before it was executed, the bishop of Ely died and the process lapsed. The feud continued in various forms at lower levels. In 1718 Cambridge rescinded Bentley's degrees, as punishment for failing to appear in the vice-chancellor's court in a civil suit. It was not until 1724 that he had them restored under the law.

In 1733 the fellows of Trinity again brought Bentley to trial before the bishop of Ely (then Thomas Greene), and he was sentenced to deprivation. The college statutes required the sentence to be executed by the vice-master Richard Walker, who was a friend of Bentley and refused to act. Although the feud continued until 1738 or 1740 (about thirty years in all), Bentley remained in his post.

=== Later studies ===
During his mastership, except for the first two years, Bentley continuously pursued his studies, although he did not publish much. In 1709 he contributed a critical appendix to John Davies's edition of Cicero's Tusculan Disputations. In the following year, he published his emendations on the Plutus and Nubes of Aristophanes, and on the fragments of Menander and Philemon. He published the last work under the pen name of "Phileleutherus Lipsiensis." He used it again two years later in his Remarks on a late Discourse of Freethinking, a reply to Anthony Collins the deist. The university thanked him for this work and its support of the Anglican Church and clergy.

Although he had long studied Horace, Bentley wrote his edition quickly in the end, publishing it in 1711 to gain public support at a critical period of the Trinity quarrel. In the preface, he declared his intention of confining his attention to criticism and correction of the text. Some of his 700 or 800 emendations have been accepted, but the majority were rejected by the early 20th century as unnecessary, although scholars acknowledged they showed his wide learning.

In 1716, in a letter to William Wake, Archbishop of Canterbury, Bentley announced his plan to prepare a critical edition of the New Testament. During the next four years, assisted by J. J. Wetstein, an eminent biblical critic, he collected materials for the work. In 1720 he published Proposals for a New Edition of the Greek Testament, with examples of how he intended to proceed. By comparing the text of the Vulgate with that of the oldest Greek manuscripts, Bentley proposed to restore the Greek text as received by the church at the time of the Council of Nicaea. Bentley's lead manuscript was Codex Alexandrinus, which he described as "the oldest and best in the world." The manuscript was so precious to him that he rescued it from perishing in the Ashburnham House fire of 1731, during which many other Cotton Library manuscripts were destroyed. Bentley used also manuscripts: 51, 54, 60, 113, 440, 507, and 508. John Walker worked over many manuscripts for the project, particularly in Paris with the help of the Maurists. Numerous subscribers were obtained to support publication of the work, but he never completed it.

His Terence (1726) is more important than his Horace; next to the Phalaris, this most determined his reputation. In 1726 he also published the Fables of Phaedrus and the Sententiae of Publilius Syrus.

His Paradise Lost (1732), suggested by Queen Caroline, has been criticised as the weakest of his work. He suggested that the poet John Milton had employed both an amanuensis and an editor, who were responsible for clerical errors and interpolations, but it is unclear whether Bentley believed his own position. A. E. Housman, who called him "the greatest scholar that England or perhaps that Europe ever bred" nevertheless criticised his poetic sensibility severely: "we are not all so easily found out as Bentley, because we have not Bentley's intrepid candour. There is a sort of savage nobility about his firm reliance on his own bad taste".

Bentley never published his planned edition of Homer, but some of his manuscript and marginal notes are held by Trinity College. Their chief importance is in his attempt to restore the metre by the insertion of the lost digamma.

== Relationships and personal life ==
According to the anonymous author of his biography in the Encyclopaedia Britannica Eleventh Edition, Bentley was self-assertive and presumptuous, which alienated some people. But, James Henry Monk, Bentley's biographer, charged him (in his first edition, 1830) with an indecorum of which he was not guilty. Bentley seemed to inspire mixed feelings of admiration and repugnance.

== Marriage and family ==
In 1701, Bentley married Joanna (died 1740), daughter of Sir John Bernard, 2nd Baronet of Brampton, Huntingdonshire. (Note: A portrait, by William Wissing of his wife Joanna, is in the collection of Trinity College, Cambridge (ArtUK).) They had three children together: Richard (1708–1782), an eccentric, playwright and artist, and two daughters. Their daughter Johanna married Denison Cumberland in 1728, a grandson of Richard Cumberland the bishop of Peterborough, and himself later a bishop of the Church of Ireland. Their son Richard Cumberland developed as a prolific dramatist while earning his living as a civil servant.

== Later life ==
In old age, Bentley continued to read and enjoyed the society of his friends and of several rising scholars, including Jeremiah Markland, John Taylor, and his nephews Richard and Thomas Bentley, with whom he discussed classical subjects. He died of pleurisy on 14 July 1742, at the age of 80.

== Legacy and honours ==
Bentley left about £5,000 in his estate (which would have the buying power of nearly £500,000 in 2010). He bequeathed a few Greek manuscripts, brought from Mount Athos, to the Trinity College library and the remainder of his books and papers to his nephew Richard Bentley, a fellow of Trinity. At his own death in 1786, the younger Bentley left the papers to the Trinity College library. The British Museum eventually purchased the books, many of which had valuable manuscript notes, and holds them in its collection.

Bentley is honoured to this day at Spalding Grammar School, where he was once headmaster. One of the 6 houses that students are sorted into is named Bentley after him, with the students wearing the colour blue on their ties and on sporting items. Furthermore, the school releases an annual magazine named the Bentlian, also named after him.

According to the anonymous author of his biography in the Encyclopaedia Britannica Eleventh Edition, Bentley was the first Englishman to be ranked with the great heroes of classical learning. Before him there were only John Selden, and, in a more restricted field, Thomas Gataker and John Pearson.

Bentley inaugurated a new era of the art of criticism. He opened a new path. With him criticism attained its majority. Where scholars had hitherto offered suggestions and conjectures, Bentley, with unlimited control over the whole material of learning, gave decisions

— Jacob Mähly (1828–1902).

The modern German school of philology recognised his genius. Bunsen wrote that Bentley "was the founder of historical philology." Jakob Bernays says of his corrections of the Tristia, "corruptions which had hitherto defied every attempt even of the mightiest, were removed by a touch of the fingers of this British Samson".

Bentley was credited with creating the English school of Hellenists, by which the 18th century was distinguished, including scholars such as Richard Dawes, Jeremiah Markland, John Taylor, Jonathan Toup, Thomas Tyrwhitt, Richard Porson, Peter Paul Dobree, Thomas Kidd and James Henry Monk. Although the Dutch school of the period had its own tradition, it was also influenced by Bentley. His letters to Tiberius Hemsterhuis on his edition of Julius Pollux made the latter one of Bentley's most devoted admirers.

Bentley inspired a following generation of scholars. Self-taught, he created his own discipline; but no contemporary English guild of learning could measure his power or check his eccentricities. He defeated his academic adversaries in the Phalaris controversy. The attacks by Alexander Pope (he was assigned a niche in The Dunciad), John Arbuthnot and others demonstrated their inability to appreciate his work, as they considered textual criticism as pedantry. Bentley's and William Wotton's animadversions on the classical learning of John Temple elicited a reply from Jonathan Swift in his Battle of the Books.

In a university where the instruction of youth or the religious controversy of the day was the chief occupation, Bentley was unique. His learning and original views seem to have been developed before 1700. After this period, he acquired little and made only spasmodic efforts to publish. However A. E. Housman believed that the edition of Manilius (1739) was Bentley's greatest work.

== Works ==
=== Major ===
- Works of Richard Bentley, collected by Alexander Dyce, 1836.
  - Vol. I: Dissertations upon the epistles of Phalaris, Themistocles, Socrates, Euripides, and upon the fables of Aesop and , Epistola ad Joannem Millium
  - Vol. II: Dissertations upon the epistles of Phalaris, Themistocles, Socrates, Euripides, and upon the fables of Aesop and , Epistola ad Joannem Millium
  - Vol. III: Sermons preached at Boyle's lecture; remarks upon a discourse of free-thinking; proposals for an edition of the Greek testament

=== Minor ===
- Astronomica of Manilius (1739)
- a letter on the Sigean inscription on a marble slab found in the Troad, now in the British Museum
- notes on the Theriaca of Nicander and on Lucan, published after his death by his grandson, Richard Cumberland
- emendations of Plautus (in his copies of the editions by Pareus, Camerarius and Gronovius, edited by Schroder, 1880, and Sonnenschein, 1883)
- Bentleii Critica Sacra (1862), edited by A. A. Ellis, contains the epistle to the Galatians (and excerpts), printed from an interleaved folio copy of the Greek and Latin Vulgate in Trinity College
- a collection of his Opuscula Philologica published at Leipzig, Germany in 1781.
- A Letter to the Reverend Master of Trinity College in Cambridge, Editor of a New Greek and Latin Testament (1721)
- A confutation of atheism from the origin and frame of the world, a sermon, Volume 20 (1692)
- A Defence of natural and revealed religion: being an abridgment of the lecture founded by the Honble Robert Boyle (1737)
- Eight Sermons Preach'd at the Honourable Robert Boyle's Lecture (1724)
- Remarks upon a late Discourse of free-thinking: in a letter to N. N. (1725)
- The Folly and Unreasonableness of Atheism: Demonstrated from the Advantage and Pleasure of a Religious Life, The faculties of Human Souls, The Structure of Animate Bodies, & The Origin and Frame of the World: In Eight Sermons (1693)
- The Present State of Trinity College in Cambridg[e], in a Letter from Dr. Bentley, London, England: A. Baldwin 1710
- Reflections on the Scandalous Aspersions cast on the Clergy, [London, England:] J. Morphew 1717
- A sermon upon popery: preach'd before the University of Cambridge, November Vth. MDCCXV. Cambridge, University press, 1715

=== Letters ===
- Bentlei et doctorum-virorum ad eum Epistolae (1807)
- The Correspondence of Richard Bentley, edited by C. Wordsworth (1842)

== See also ==
- Bentley's paradox
- Trinity College Clock

== Notes ==
Academic offices
Preceded by John Montagu	Master of Trinity College, Cambridge; 1700–1742	Succeeded by Robert Smith
Preceded by Henry James	Regius Professor of Divinity at Cambridge; 1717–1742	Succeeded by John Whalley
