= Thomas Kidd (classical scholar) =

18th/19th-century English classical scholar

Thomas Kidd (1770 – 27 August 1850) was an English classical scholar and schoolmaster.

He was born in Yorkshire, and educated at Giggleswick School and Trinity College, Cambridge. He was the father of John Tyrwhitt Davy Kidd who served in India for many years and Richard Bentley Porson Kidd, who was rector of Potter Heigham church among other duties in Norwich, Norfolk. The last of these had a son, Richard Hayward Kidd, who was Colonial Chaplain of Hong Kong until his death in 1879.

Kidd held numerous scholastic and clerical appointments. In 1818 he was appointed headmaster of King's Lynn School; he next became master of Wymondham School, and then of Norwich School. His last appointment was as rector of Croxton, near Cambridge, where he died. Kidd was an intimate friend of Richard Porson and Charles Burney the younger. He contributed largely to periodicals, chiefly on classical subjects, but his reputation mainly rests upon his editions of the works of other scholars:

- Opuscula Ruhnkeniana (1807), the minor works of the great Dutch scholar David Ruhnken
- Tracts and Miscellaneous Criticisms of Richard Porson (1815).
- Miscellanea Critica of Richard Dawes (2nd ed., 1827)

He also published an edition of the works of Horace (1817) based upon Richard Bentley's recension.
