= Minuscule 113 =

- New Testament manuscript
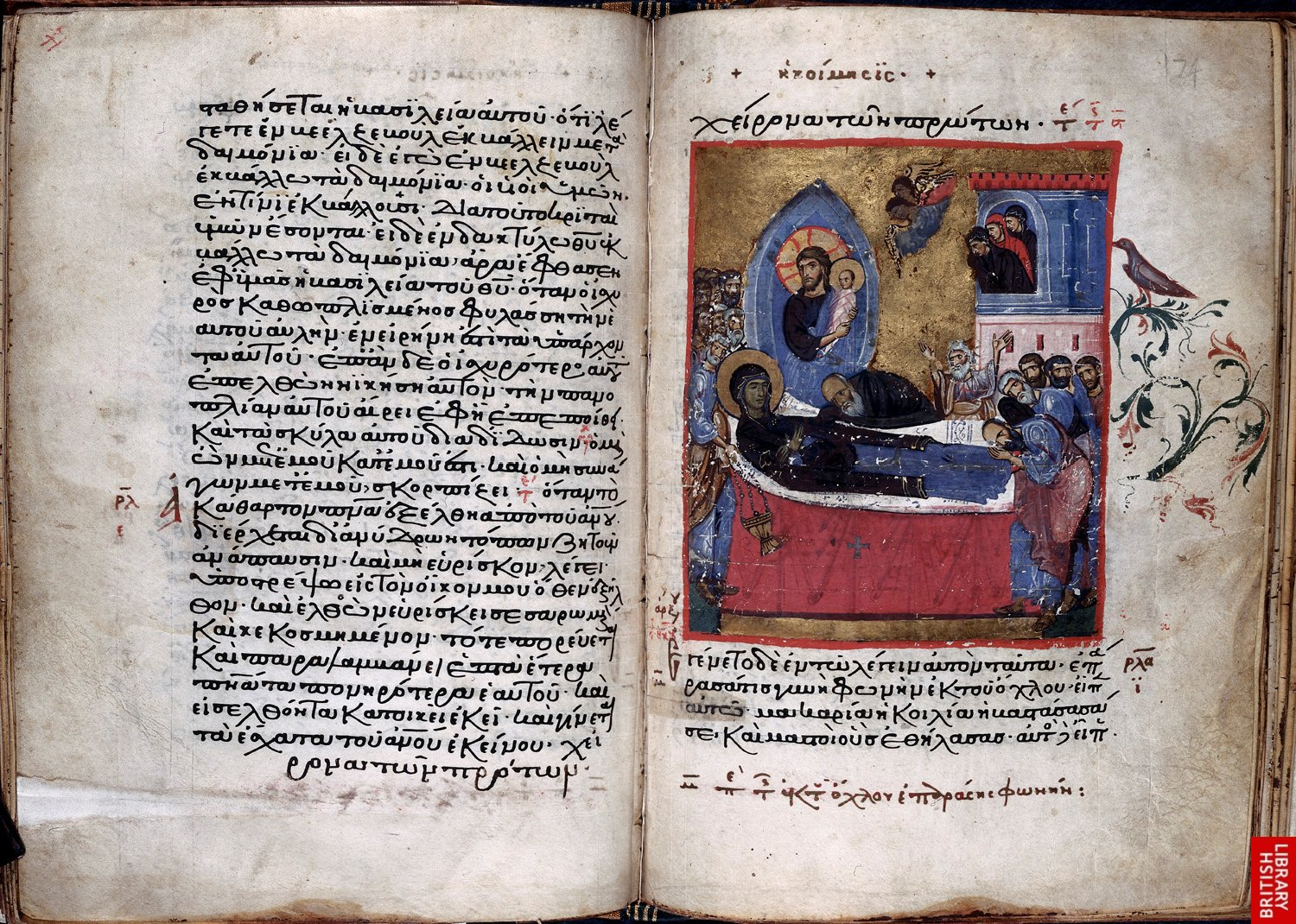
- Folios 173 verso – 174 recto
- Name: Harley MS 1810
- Text: Gospels
- Date: 11th-century
- Script: Greek
- Found: Asia Minor
- Now at: British Library
- Size: 22.9 cm by 16.7 cm
- Type: Byzantine/mixed
- Category: none
- Note: illuminated marginalia

Minuscule 113 (in the Gregory-Aland numbering), ε 134 (Soden), is a Greek minuscule manuscript of the New Testament, on parchment leaves. Paleographically it has been assigned to the 11th-century.

The manuscript has complex contents, but some leaves of the codex were supplied on paper by a modern hand. It has full marginalia. The text represents the Byzantine tradition.

== Description ==
The codex contains a complete text of the four Gospels on 270 parchment leaves (size 22.9 cm by 16.7 cm). The text is written in one column per page, in 26 lines per page, with a wide margins (size of the text is 16 cm by 10.5 cm). The leaves are arranged in quarto (four leaves in quires). It has decorated headpieces (flowers). The large initial letters are decorated (zoomorphic motifs), the small initials are written in gold. It has breathings (spiritus asper and spiritus lenis) and accents. The nomina sacra are written in an abbreviated way.

Folios 1–13 were added on paper (possibly in the 16th century), with small initials and simple headpiece in red.

The text is divided according to the κεφαλαια (chapters), whose numbers are given at the margin of the text, and their τιτλοι (titles) at the top of the pages. There is also another division according to the smaller Ammonian Sections, whose numbers are given at the margin, with a references to the Eusebian Canons (written below number of section). The conclusions of each section of text are written in geometric shapes.

It contains Prolegomena of Cosmas, Epistula ad Carpianum, the Eusebian tables in colours and gold, tables of the κεφαλαια (tables of contents) before each Gospel, lectionary markings at the margin for the church's readings, synaxaria (later hand), subscriptions at the end of each Gospel, and 24 pictures (portraits of Evangelists, important biblical stories, etc.).

== Text ==
The Greek text of the codex is a representative of the Byzantine text-type with some alien readings. Hermann von Soden classified it to the textual family I^{κ}, now known as Family Π. Kurt Aland did not place the Greek text of the codex in any Category.

According to the Claremont Profile Method it represents the textual family K^{x} in Luke 1 and Π473 in Luke 10 and Luke 20 (along with minuscule 473). It belongs to the textual cluster 1053 in Luke 1. The cluster has the following profile in Luke 10: 1, 8 15, 22, 23, 25, 30, 47, 48, 53, 57, 60, 63, 64, in Luke 20: 4, 8, 9, 13, 19, 24, 26, 28, 34, 61, 62.

Some textual variants

The word before the bracket is the reading of the UBS edition. The profile of a manuscript is formed by noting the numbers of those test readings where the manuscript agrees with the bold reading. The readings which are not bold are those of the Textus Receptus.

Luke 10:1 — δυο δυο ] δυο
Luke 10:2 — οπως ] οπως αν
Luke 10:6 — εαν ] εαν μεν
Luke 10:11 — εις τους ποδας ] omit
Luke 10:12 — λεγω ] λεγω δε
Luke 10:13 — Βηθσαιδα ] βηθσαιδαν
Luke 10:16 — ακουων υμων ] υμων ακουων
Luke 10:32 — ελθων ] omit
Luke 10:32 — ιδων ] ιδων αυτον
Luke 10:35 — τι ] τι δ'
Luke 10:36 — πλησιον δοκει σοι ] δοκει σοι πλησιον
Luke 10:39 — τον λογον ] των λογων
Luke 10:41 — ειπεν αυτη ο κυριος (or Ιησους) ] ο κυριος ειπεν αυτη
Luke 10:42 — γαρ ] δε
Luke 20:1 — αρχιερεις ] ιερεις
Luke 20:3 — υμας καγω ] καγω υμας
Luke 20:3 — ενα λογον (=Textus Receptus) ] λογον ενα
Luke 20:5 — δια τι ] πας ο λαος
Luke 20:9 — τις ] omit
Luke 20:12 — και τουτον ] κακεινον
Luke 20:14 — διελογιζοντο ] διελογισαντο
Luke 20:14 — κληρονομος ] κληρονομος δευτε
Luke 20:19 — τας χειρας ] την χειρα
Luke 20:34 — γαμισκονται ] εκγαμιζονται (Τextus Receptus reads: εκγαμισκονται)
Luke 20:35 — γαμισκονται ] εκγαμιζονται (Τextus Receptus reads: εκγαμισκονται)

== History ==
The place of origin of the codex is unknown. It is believed that it could have been written in Eastern Mediterranean (perhaps Cyprus or Palestine). The manuscript was bound in modern times.

Griesbach dated the manuscript to the 10th or 11th century. Scrivener and Gregory dated the manuscript to the 11th century. Currently it is dated by the INTF to the 11th century.

According to the inscription on the first folio it once belonged to Botiros (?), in the 16th century. It was a part of the collection of Robert Harley (1661–1724), and his son Edward Harley (1689–1741). In 1753, it was purchased by the British government for the British Museum.

The manuscript was examined by Richard Bentley, who designated it by θ'. Griesbach examined several of its passages and occasionally cited their texts in his Novum Testemantum Graece (e.g. in Matthew 3:8). It was also examined by Birch, Scholz, and Bloomfield. C. R. Gregory saw it in 1883.

The manuscript was not mentioned on the list of Wettstein (the last number 112). It was added to the list of New Testament manuscripts by Griesbach, who gave it the number 113.

It is currently housed at the British Library (Harley MS 1810).

== Gallery ==
widths="150px"

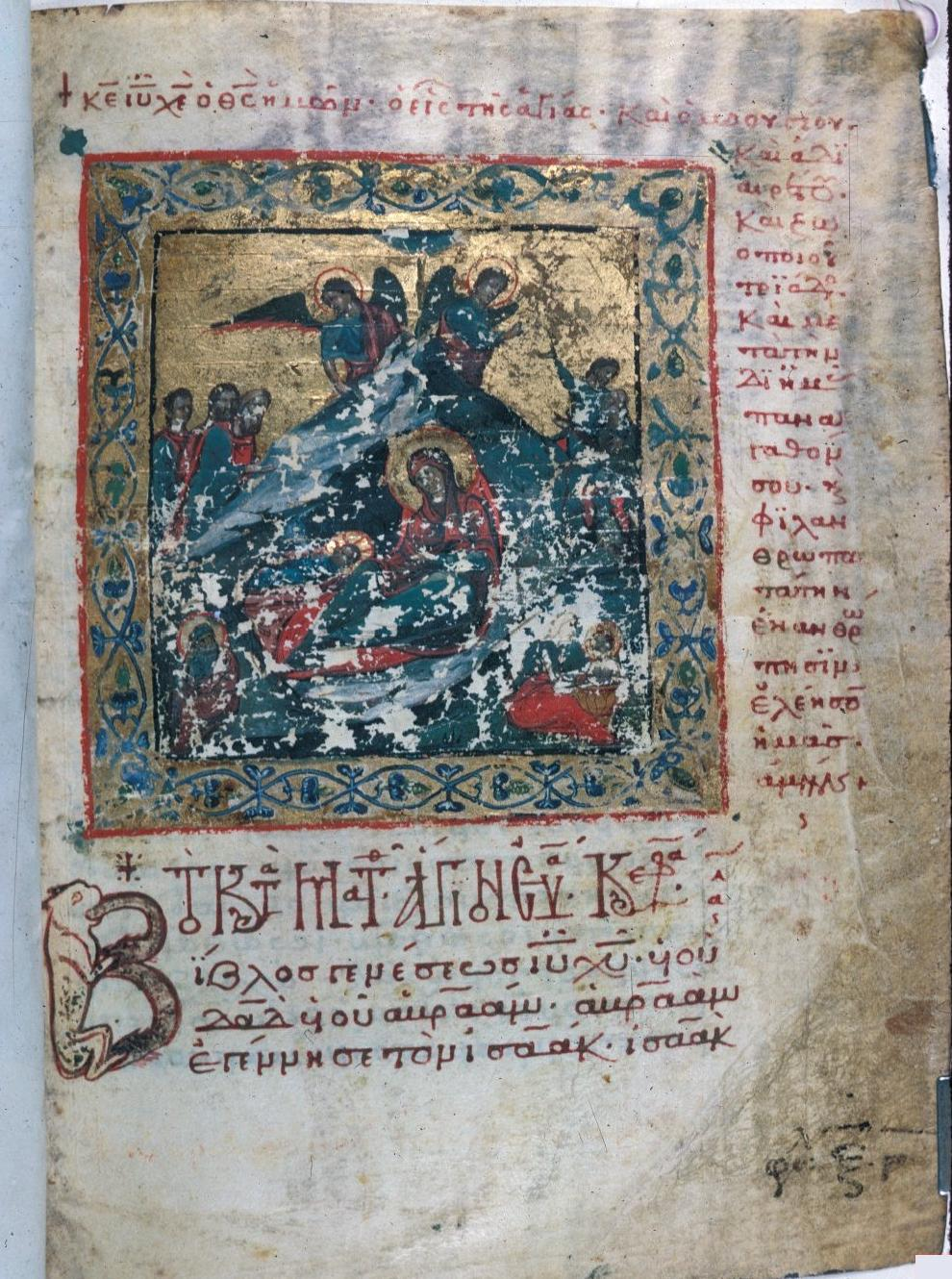
The first page of Matthew

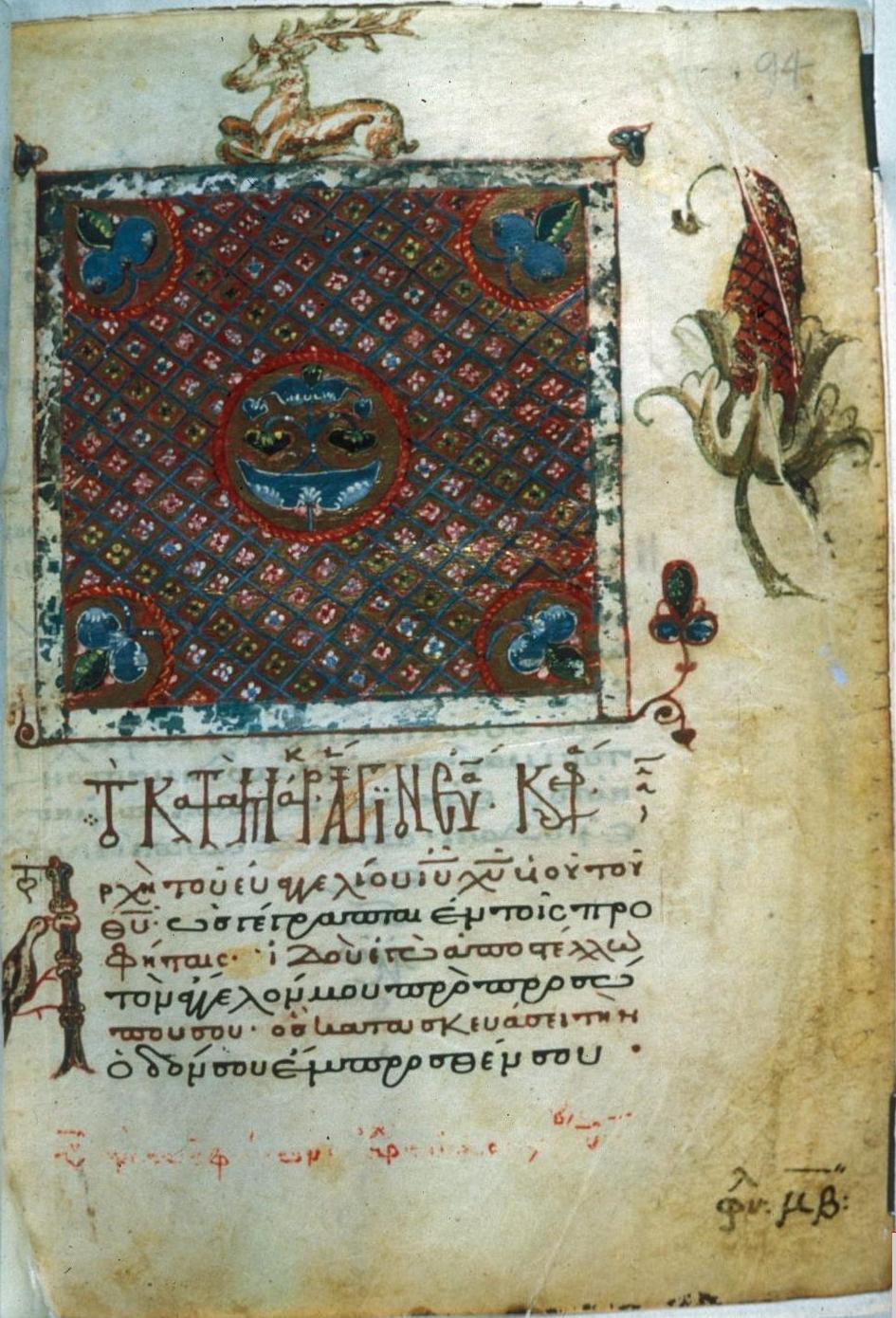
The first page of Mark

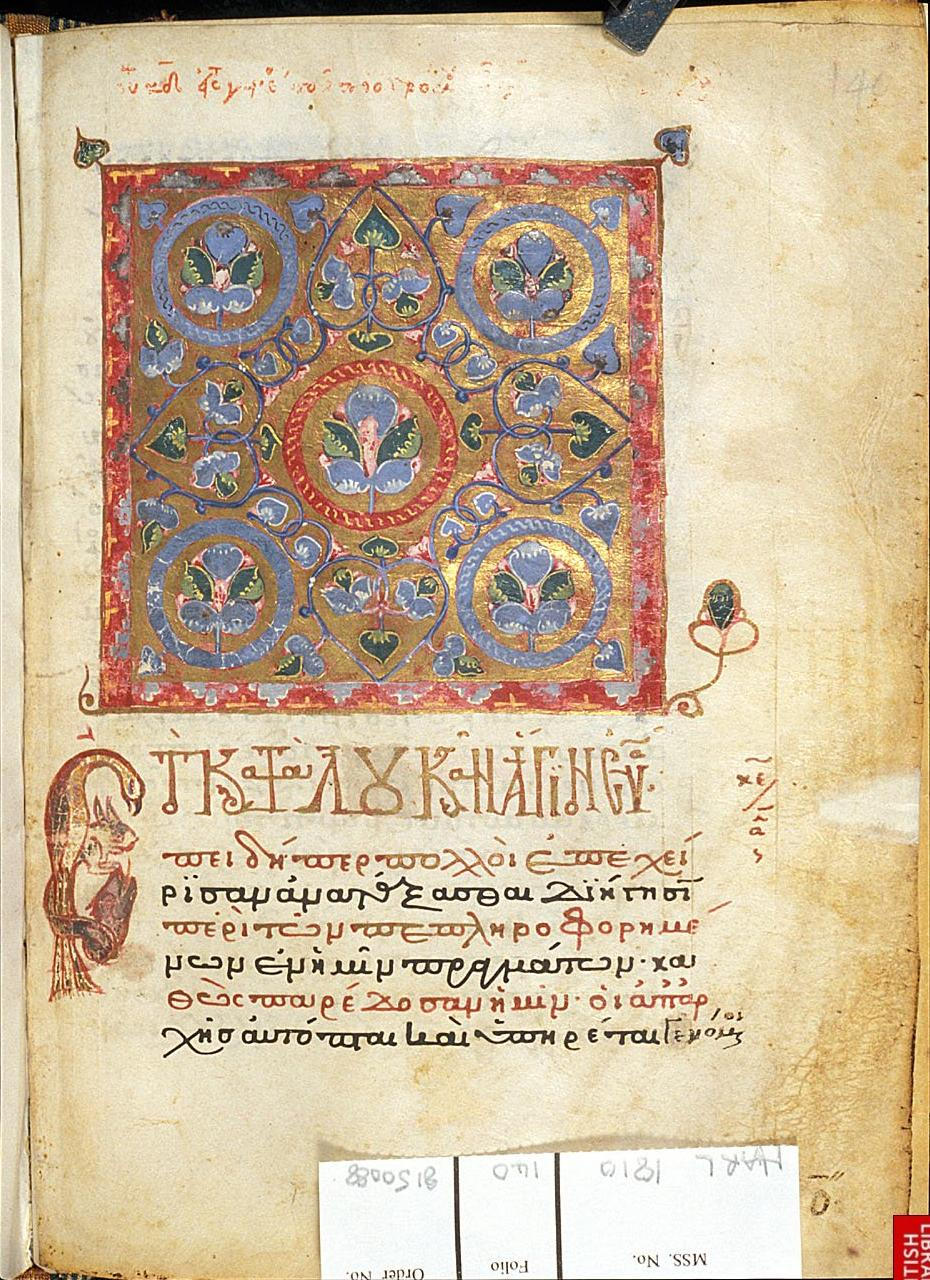
The first page of Luke

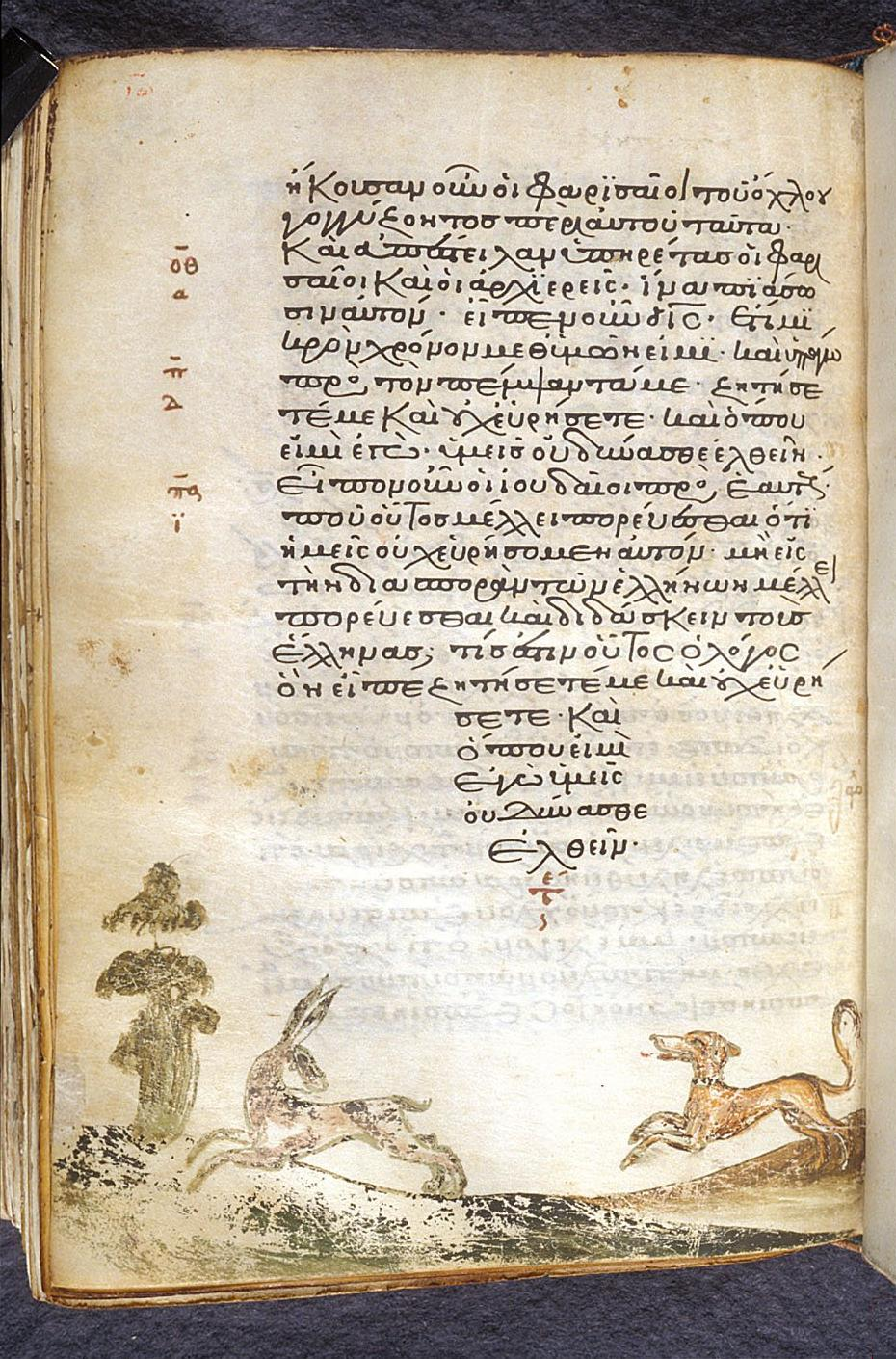
Folio 229 verso

== See also ==
- List of New Testament minuscules
- Biblical manuscript
- Textual criticism
