= Harleian Library =

Part of the British Library

Coordinates: 51.530°N 0.128°W

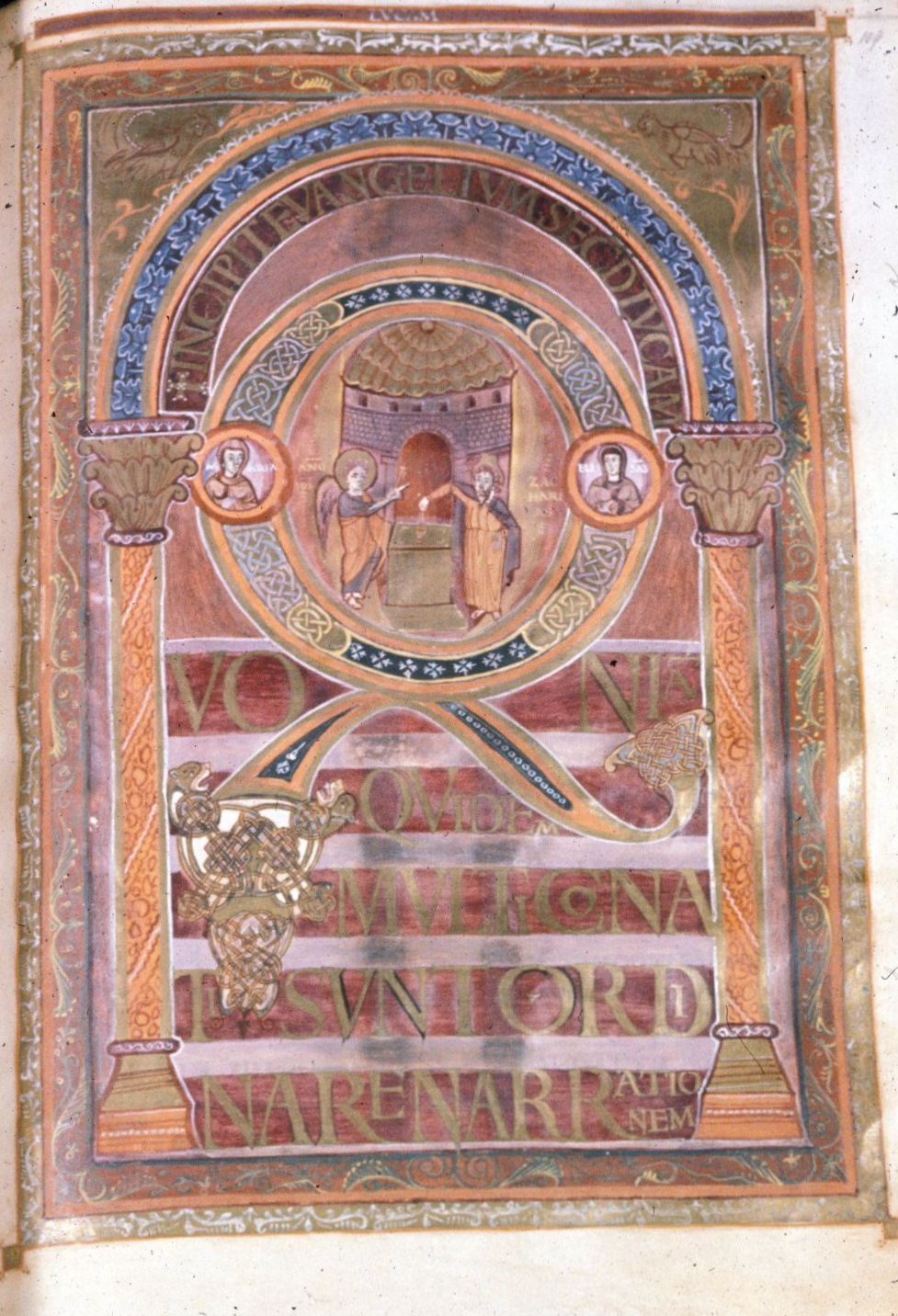
Harley Golden Gospels, Incipit to Luke, 800–825

The Harleian Library, Harley Collection, Harleian Collection and other variants (Latin: Bibliotheca Harleiana) is one of the main "closed" collections (namely, historic collections to which new material is no longer added) of the British Library in London, formerly the library of the British Museum.

The collection comprises 7,660 manuscripts, including 2,200 illuminated manuscripts, more than 14,000 original legal documents; and more than 500 rolls. It was assembled by Robert Harley (1661–1724) and his son Edward (1689–1741). In 1753, it was purchased for £10,000 by the British government. Together with the collections of Sir Robert Cotton (the Cotton library) and Hans Sloane (the Sloane library) it formed the basis of the British Museum's collection of manuscripts, which were transferred to the new British Library in 1973.

The collection contains illuminated manuscripts spanning the early Middle Ages to the Renaissance. There are important early British manuscripts, many from Western Europe, and several Byzantine manuscripts in Greek and other languages.

== Manuscripts ==
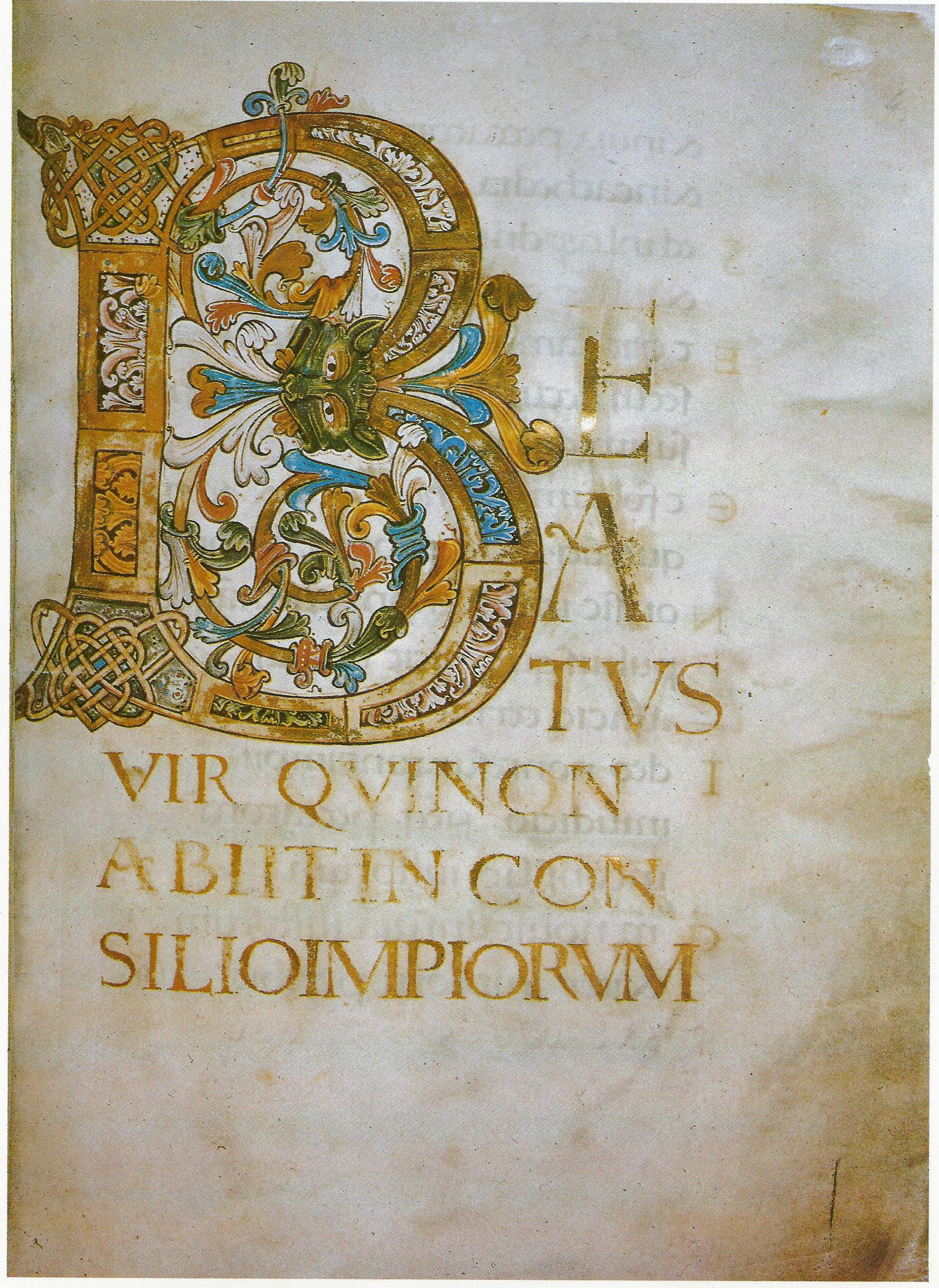
Beatus initial, f.4 of the Ramsey Psalter

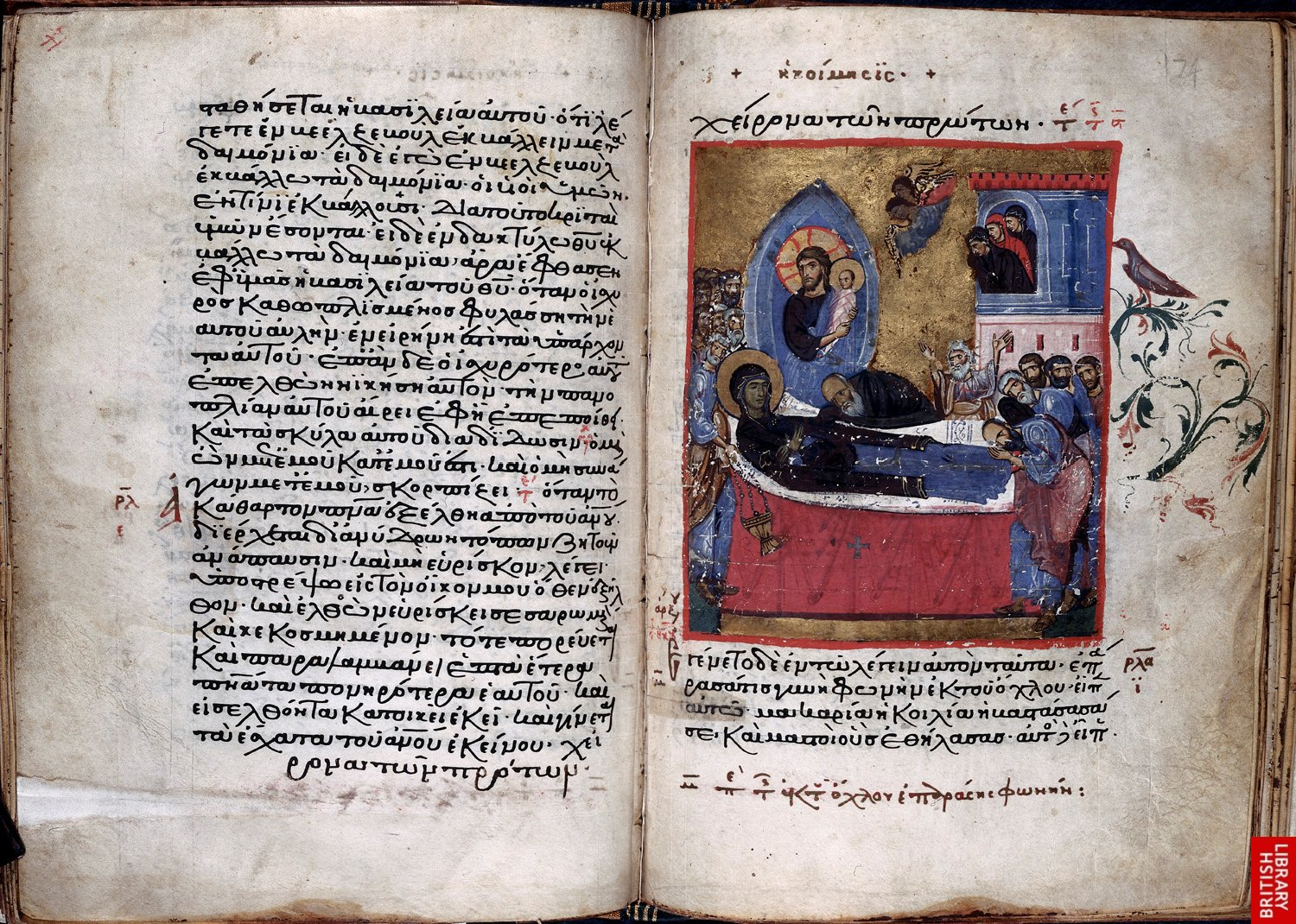
Harley 1810 is a Greek minuscule manuscript of the New Testament

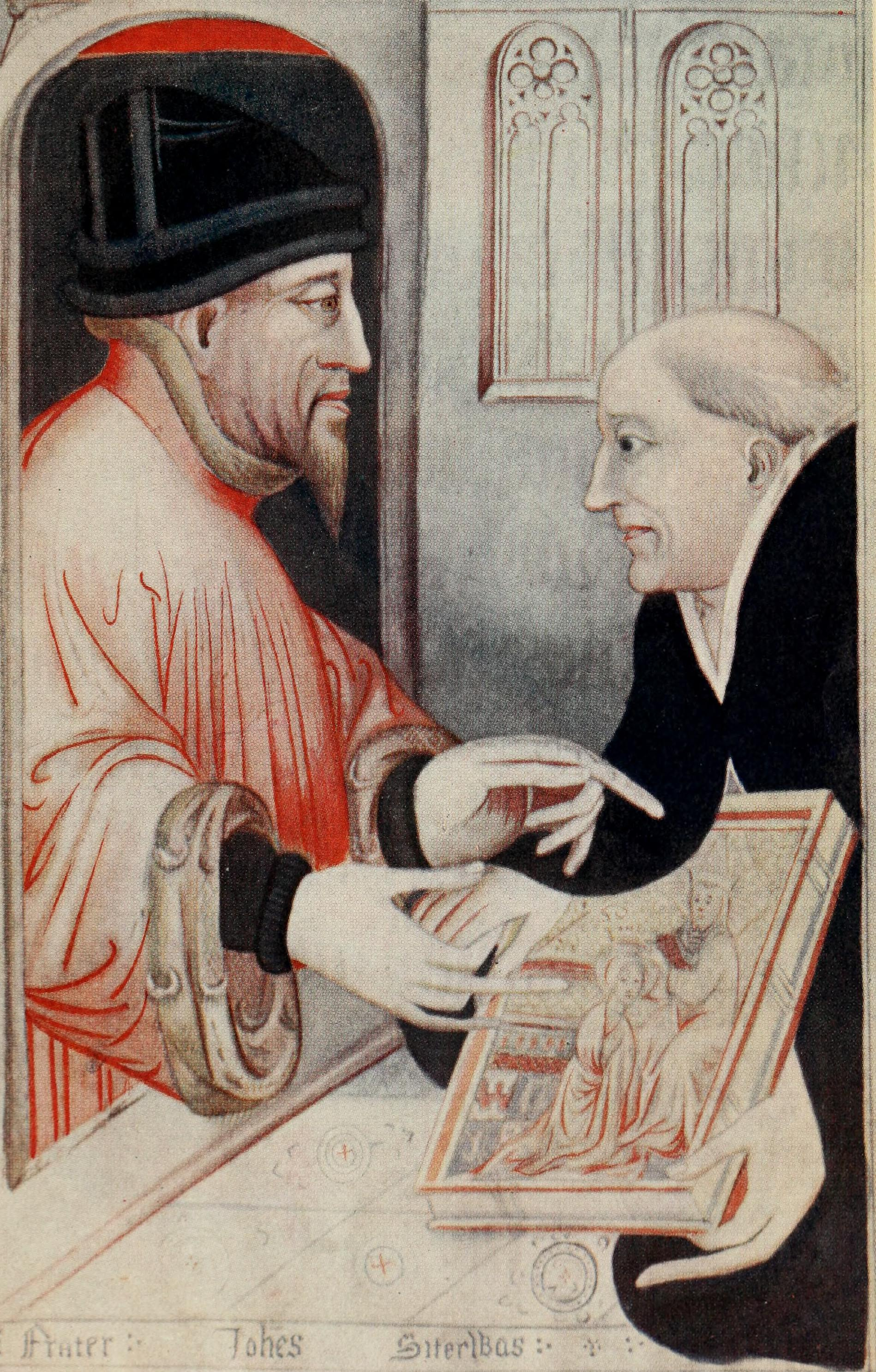
A gospel book (Harley 7026); the last page shows the donor Lord Lovel presenting the book to Salisbury Cathedral

Among the most significant manuscripts are:

- Lacnunga (Harley MS 585)
- Harley Psalter (Harley MS 603)
- Kildare Poems (Harley MS 913)
- Annales Cambriae, in Harley MS 3859; including medieval Welsh genealogies and other items
- Sumer Is Icumen In, in Harley MS 978
- Inventory of Henry VIII of England (Harley MS 1419)
- Gospels of Mael Brigte (Harley MS 1602)
- Harley 1775, an illuminated Gospel Book produced in Italy during the last quarter of the 6th century
- Minuscule 113 (Harley MS 1810) - and many others, see the category at bottom of the page
- Harley Lyrics (Harley MS 2253)
- Harley Golden Gospels (Harley MS 2788)
- Ramsey Psalter (Harley MS 2904)
- Book of Nunnaminster (Harley MS 2965)
- Minuscule 3686
- Harleian Genealogies (Harley MS 3859)
- Book of the Queen (Harley MS 4431)
- Minuscule 104 (Harley MS 5537)
- Minuscule 505 (Harley MS 5538)
- Uncial 0121a (Harley MS 5613)
- Ptolemy's Geography (Harley MS 7182 & 7195)
- Harley MS 7334
- Harleian prayerbook (Harley MS 7653)
- The Harley Glossary (eleventh-century Latin-Old English glossary, Harley MA 3376)

== Catalogue ==
- Nares, Robert; Ellis, Henry; Horne, Thomas Hartwell, eds. (1808–1812). A Catalogue of the Harleian Manuscripts, in the British Museum. London: Record Commission. (4 vols): vol. 1 (MSS 1–1309); vol. 2 (MSS 1310–3099); vol. 3 (MSS 3100–7639); vol. 4 (indexes)
