= Gospels of Máel Brigte =

Irish Gospel book from c. 1138

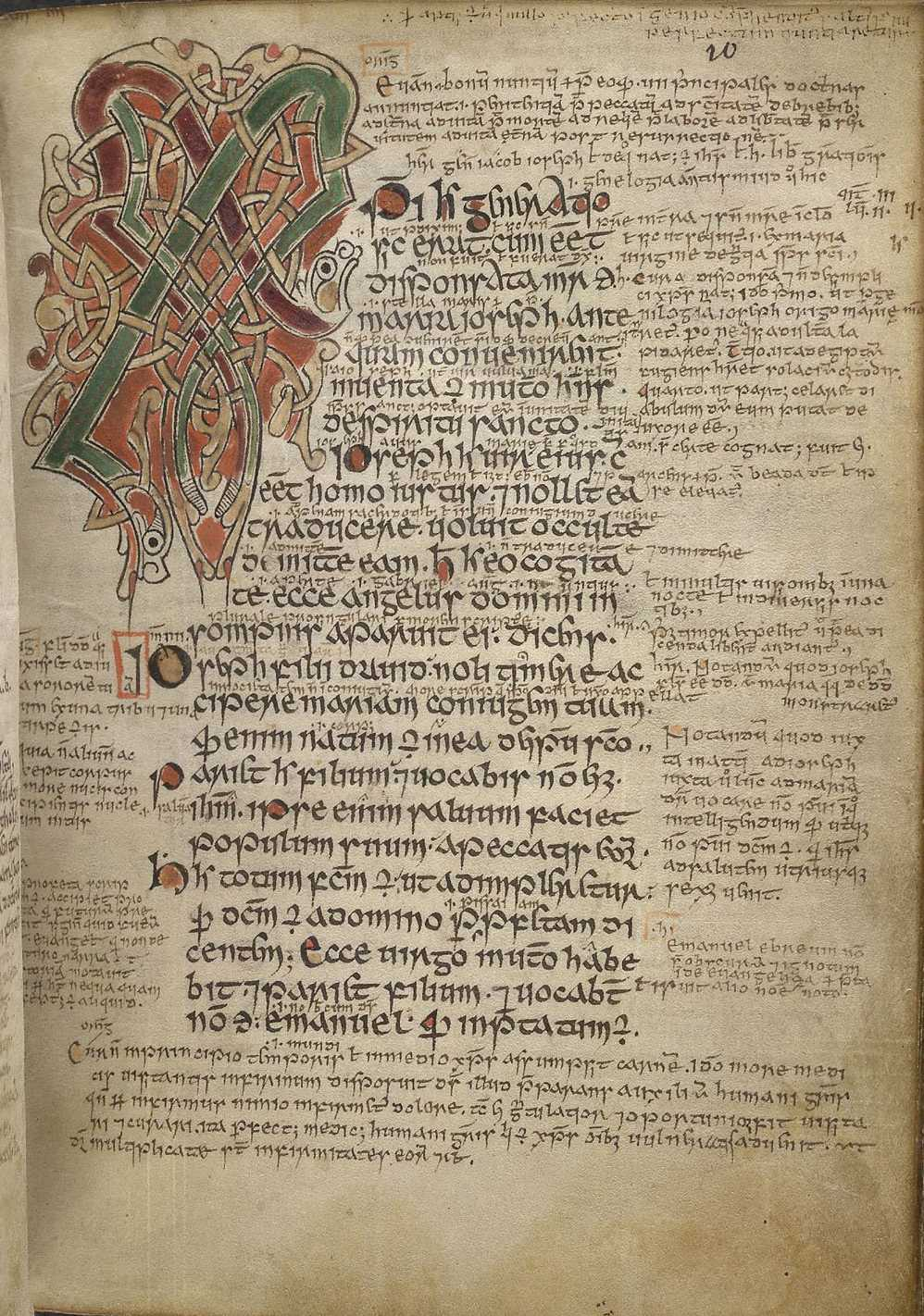
The illuminated Chi Rho monogram for Matthew 1:18 on folio 10 recto of the Gospels of Máel Brigte

The Gospels of Máel Brigte (British Library, Harley MS 1802, also known as the Armagh Gospels and the Marelbrid Gospels) is an illuminated Gospel Book, with glosses.

It was created c. 1138, or 1139, by the scribe named Máel Brigte úa Máel Úanaig, in Armagh. The codex includes the Latin text of the Gospels, along with glosses and prefatory material. There are also several inscriptions in Irish.

== Composition ==
There are 156 vellum folios along with 2 parchment and 2 paper flyleaves which are not counted in the official foliation. The leaves are 165 mm by 120 mm. The text is contained in area of 120 mm by 70 mm. The text is written in an Irish minuscule hand. The binding of red leather with gilt tooling is post-medieval.

== Contents ==
In addition to the text of the Gospels, the manuscript includes several pieces of prefatory material. The Genealogy of Jesus found at the beginning of the Gospel of Matthew (Matthew 1:1-17) is treated as a separate work than the rest of Matthew and is separated from the main text of Matthew.

The prefatory material includes: Jerome's prologue to the Vulgate translation of the Bible (folio 1r), the prologue to the Gospel of Matthew (folio 3r), the Genealogy of Jesus from Matthew (folio 4v), a list of interpretations of the Syriac and Hebrew names found in the Gospels (folio 4v), a poem in Irish on the Three Magi (folio 5v), the prologues to the Gospels of Mark (folio 6r), Luke (folio 6v) and John (folio 7v), a prologue to the four Gospels in which the evangelist are compared to other groupings of four such as the four seasons and the four elements, and a poem in Irish on the appearance and manner of death of Christ and the Twelve Apostles (folio 9v).

The gospel prologues do not precede each gospel, as in many other insular manuscripts, but are gathered together with other prefatory material. Following the prefatory material, the Gospel of Matthew starts at the beginning of the Nativity narrative at Matthew 1:18 (folio 10r), and is followed by the complete texts of the Gospels of Mark (folio 61r), Luke (folio 87r) and John (folio 128r).

At the end of each Gospel there are colophons which identify the scribe and give some information about him. He is identified as Máel Brigte úa Máel Úanaig and he was writing in Armagh in his twenty-eighth year. Máel Brigte alludes to various contemporary events, such as the killing of Cormac Mac Cárthaig by Toirdelbach Ua Briain which allow the writing of the manuscript to be dated to 1138. Marginal and interlinear glosses and notes were added in the 13th century.

== Style ==
The manuscript is decorated in Insular style. Although the high point of Insular style was centuries before the production of this manuscript, this manuscript is an example of the enduring appeal of the Insular style in Ireland. The decoration in the manuscript includes two full page miniatures of Evangelist symbols, the lion of Mark (folio 60) and the ox of Luke (folio 86). In both of the miniatures, the artist has solved the problem presented by placing horizontally oriented animals in the space of the vertically oriented page by turning the animals ninety degrees so that they seem to walk up the page. Both symbols are abstracted, placed against an abstract multi-colored background, and contained within a thick border made of decorated panels.

There are also four large zoomorphic initials in the manuscript; at the beginning of the Nativity of Christ in the Gospel of Matthew (Matthew 1:18, folio 10r), and the beginning of each of the other Gospels (folios 61r, 87r, and 128r). There are smaller initials at beginning of each section of the prefatory material, and at important texts within the Gospel, including the Pater Noster in Matthew (folio 19r), the Magnificat in the Luke (folio 88r), and the beginning of the Resurrection sequence in Luke. Other initials in the manuscript are highlighted in color. All of the decoration in the manuscript is done in green, red, brown, and yellow washes.

== History ==
The manuscript was in the Bibliothèque du Roi in Paris by the early 18th century, when it was described as being part of library by Père Richard Simon in his Bibliothèque critique in 1708. It was stolen from the Bibliothèque du Roi in 1707, along with other manuscripts, by Jean Aymon. Aymon took it to Holland where it was purchased by Robert Harley. It remained part of the Harley Collection, which was purchased in 1753 by Act of Parliament and became one of the foundational collections for the British Museum and later the British Library.

== Notes and references ==
=== Primary sources ===
- The British Library. "Detailed record for Harley 1802, Gospels of Maelbrigte (the 'Armagh Gospels'; 'Marelbrid Gospels'), with glosses". The British Library. Archived from the original on 2007-06-12.

=== Secondary sources ===
- Reeves, William (1836–1869). "On an Irish MS. of the Four Gospels in the British Museum". Proceedings of the Royal Irish Academy. 5: 45–67. JSTOR 20489687.
- Harleian Trustees (1759). Harleian collection, No. 1802 (Irish MS of the Four Gospels). Vol. A Catalogue of the Harleian Collection of Manuscripts, purchased by authority of the Parliament, for the use of the Publick, and preserved in the British Museum, Volume I (Digitized 2016, original in Austrian National Library ed.). Original published by Order of the Trustees. London - printed by Dryden Leach, MDCCLIX.

== Gallery ==
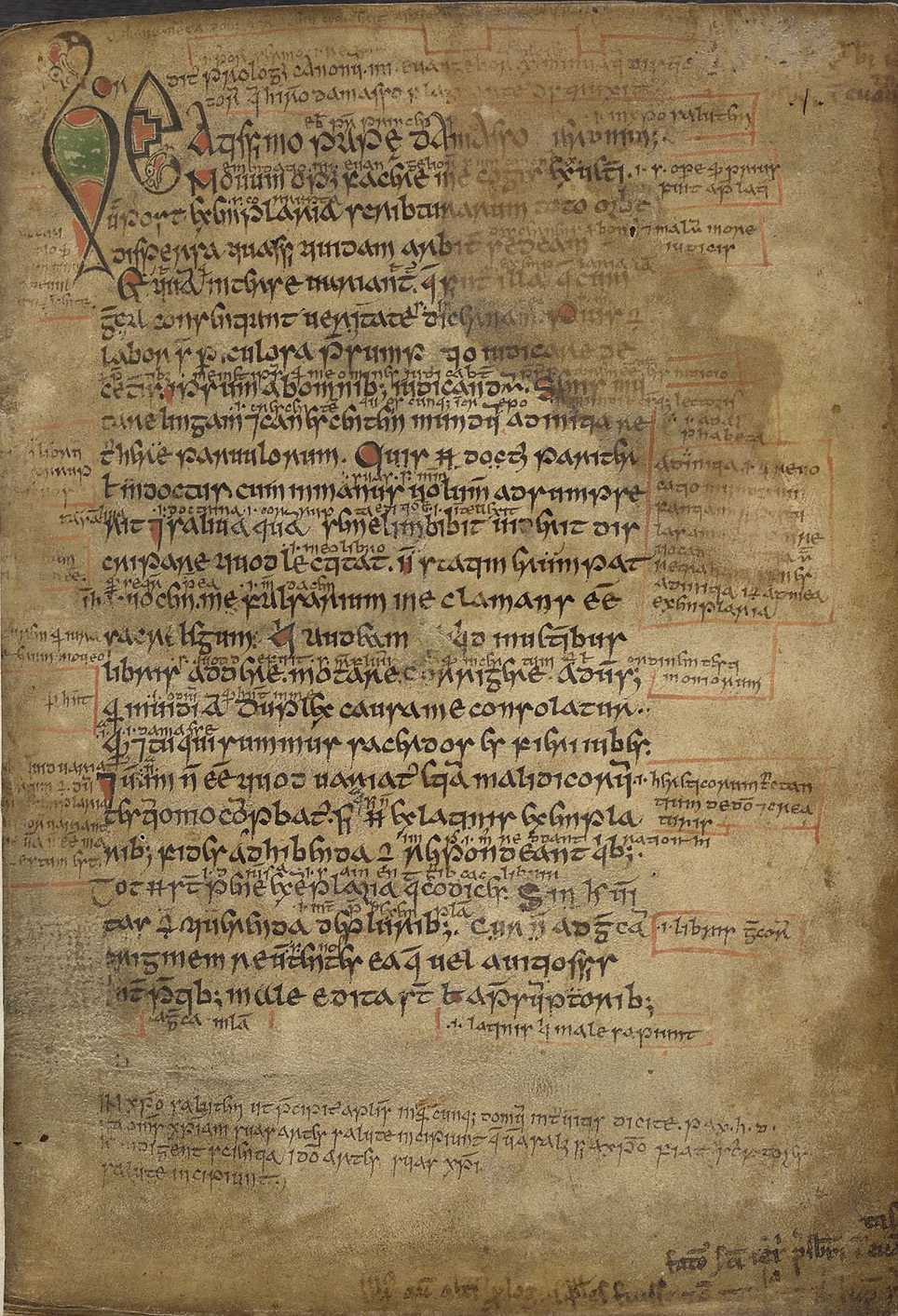
Folio 1 recto.

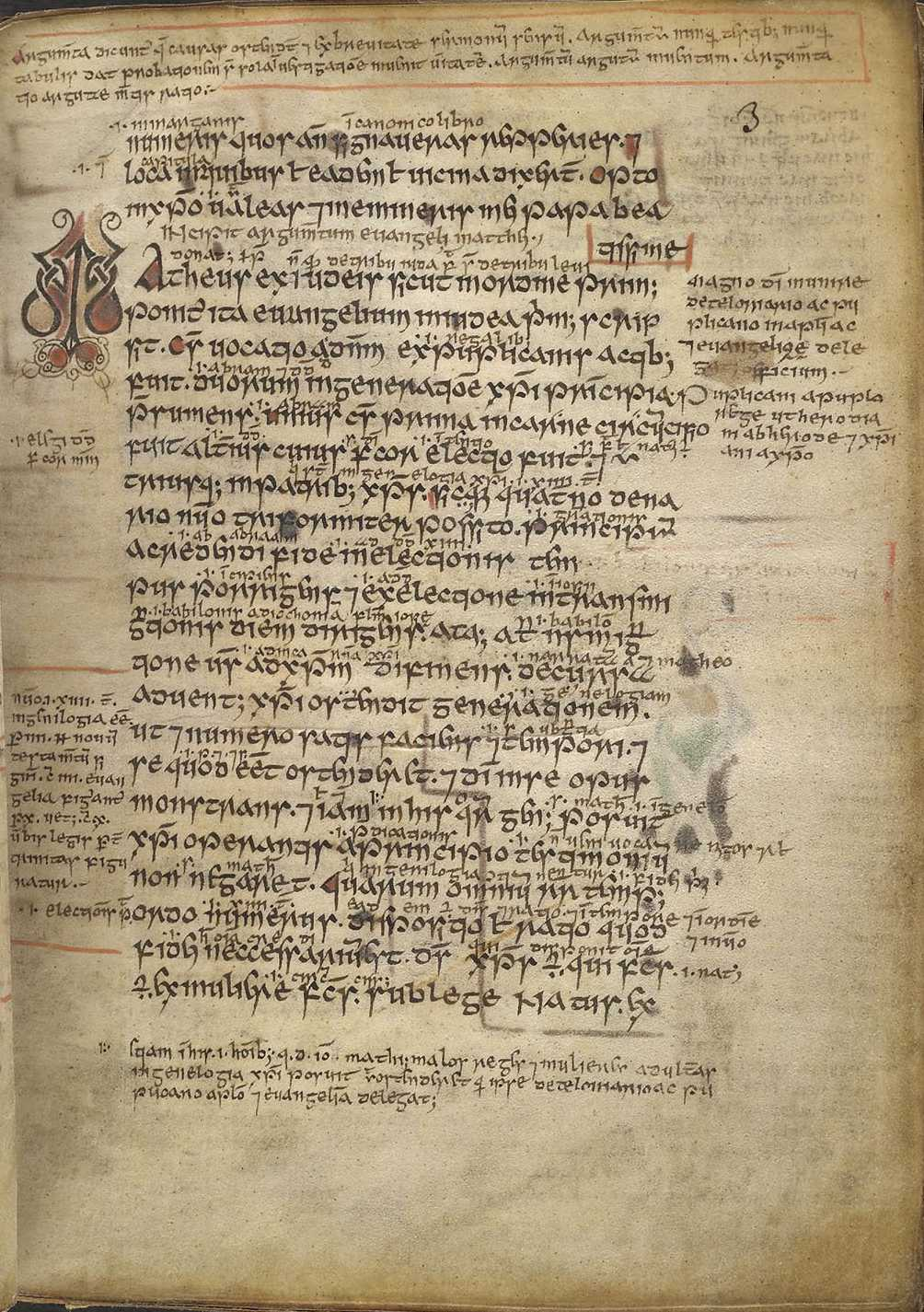
Folio 3 recto.

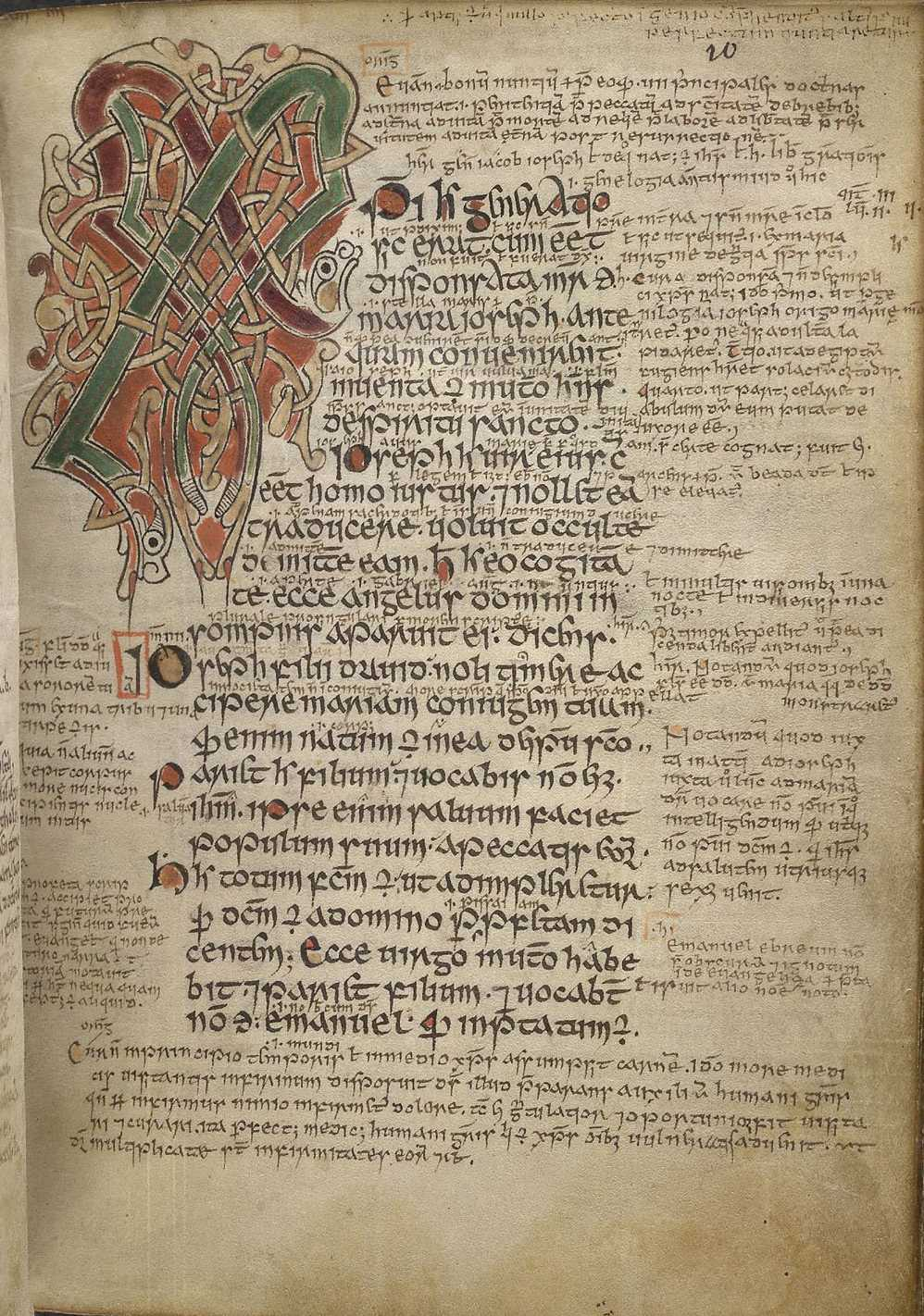
Folio 10 recto.

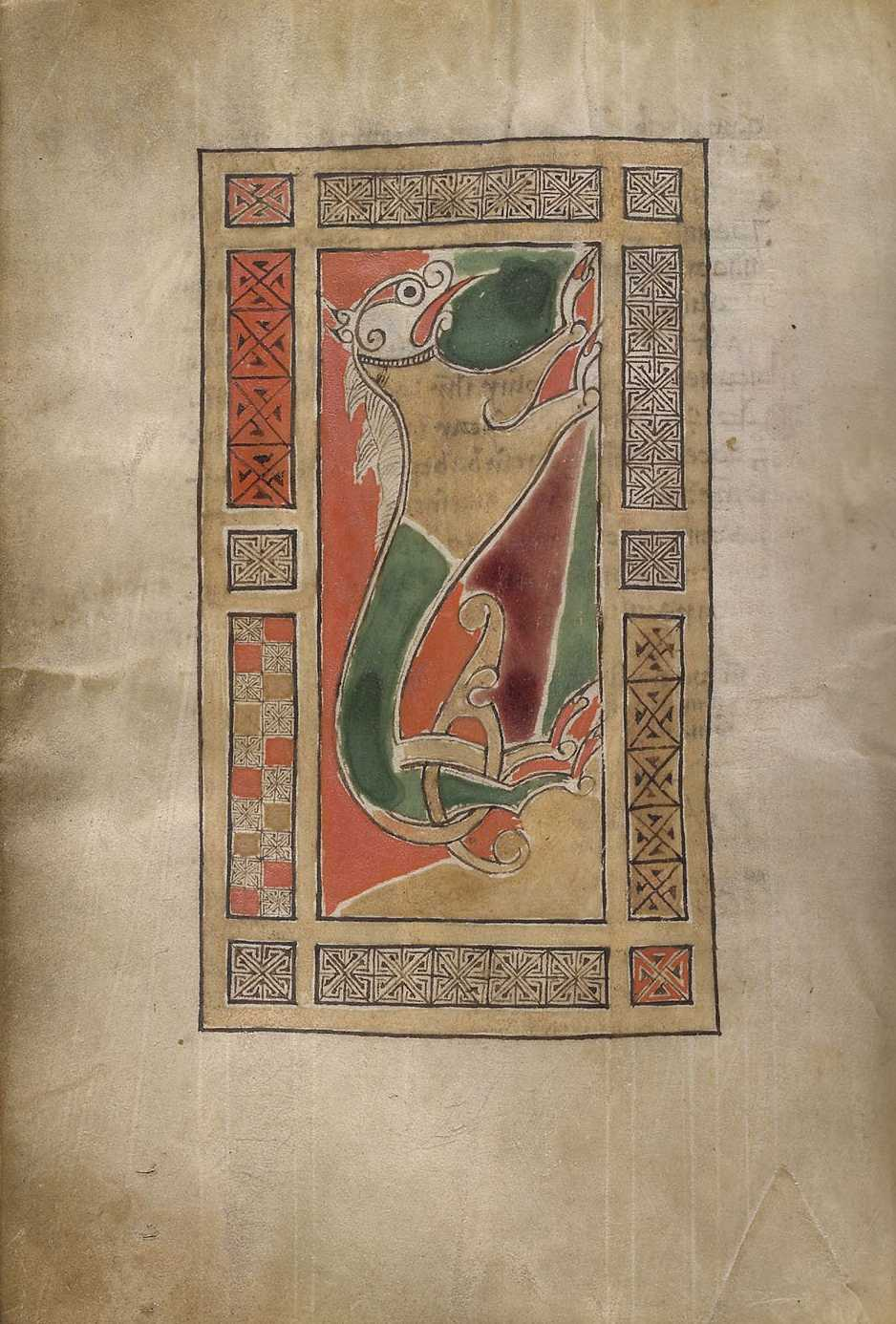
Folio 60 verso.

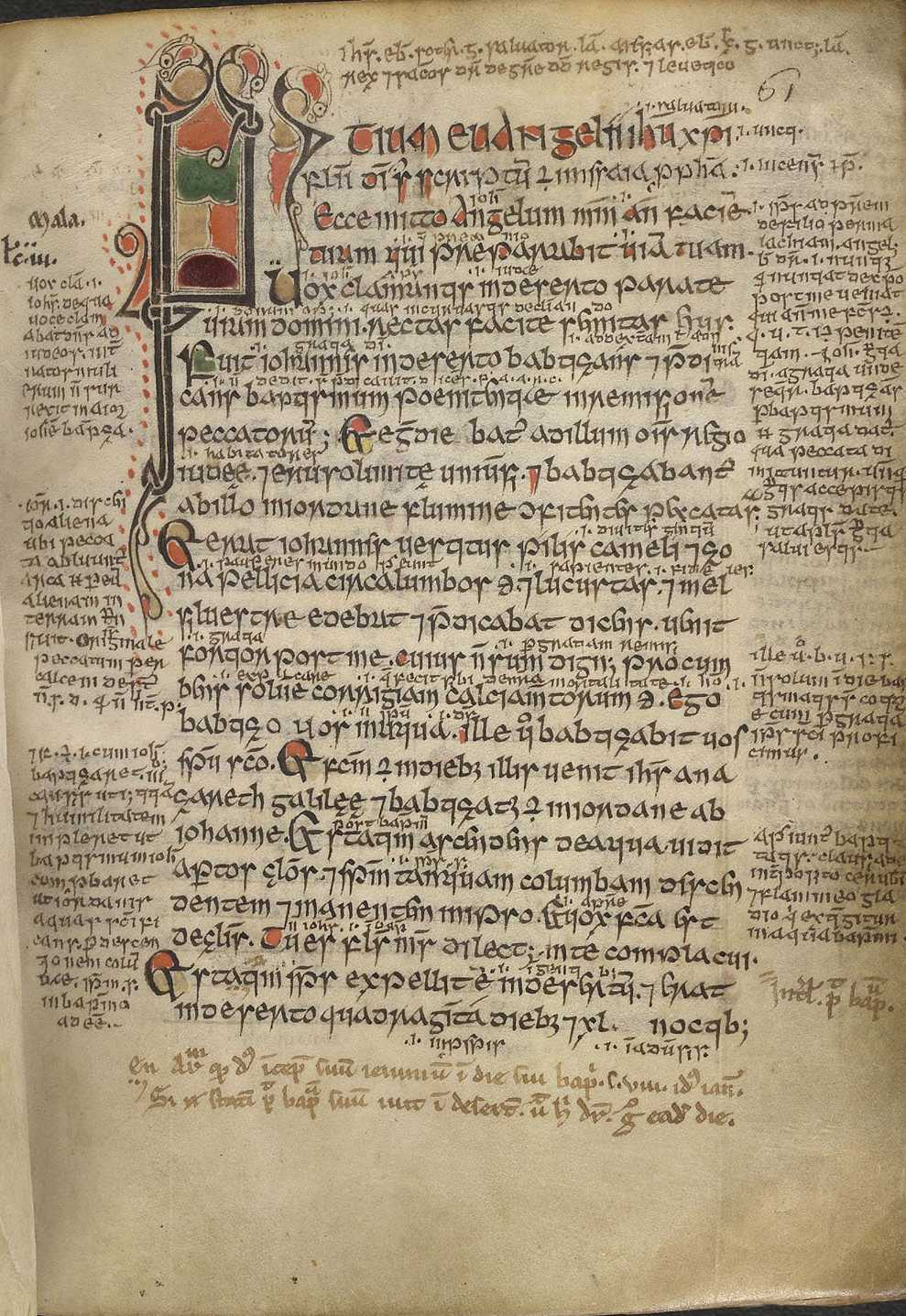
Folio 61 recto.

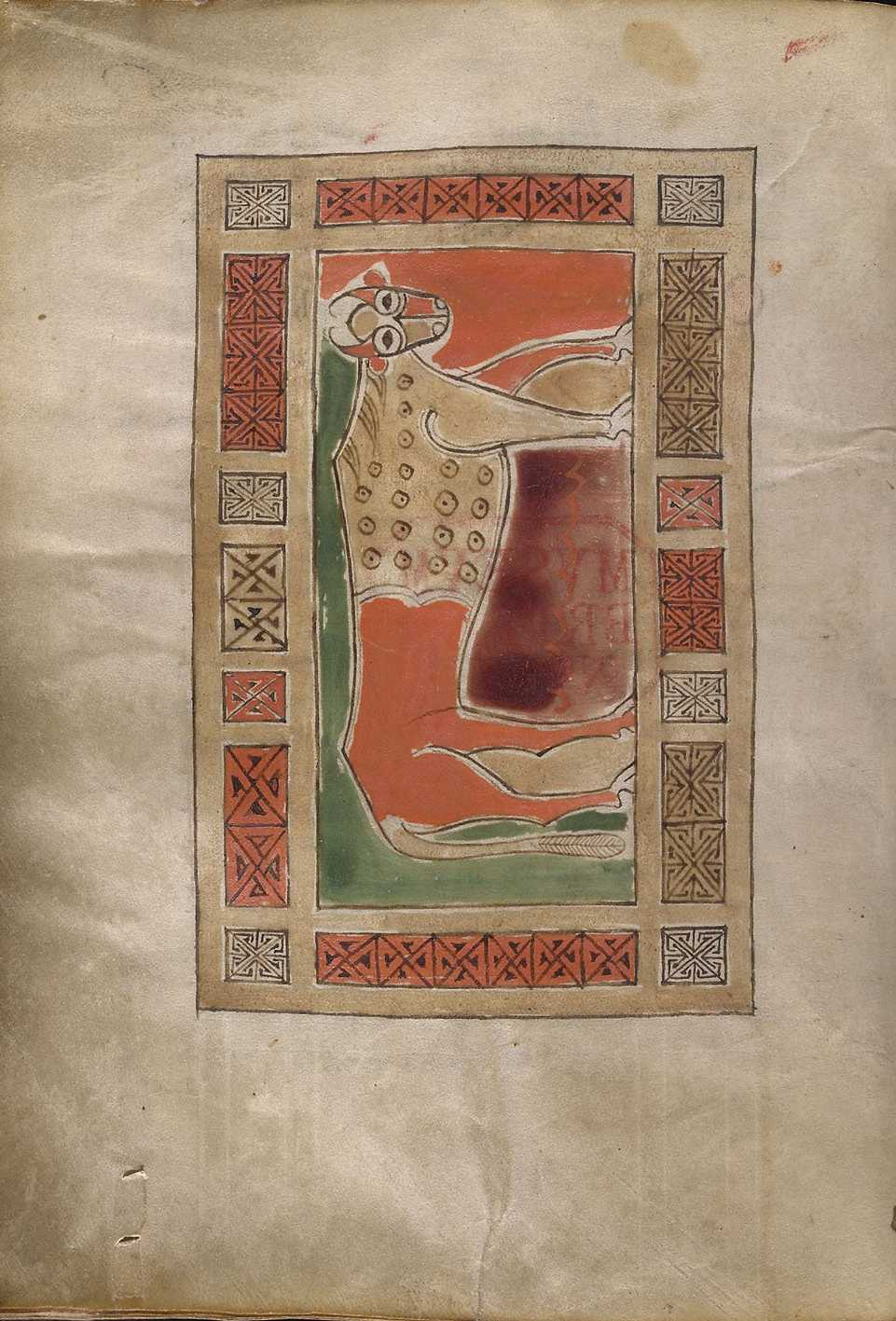
Folio 86 verso.

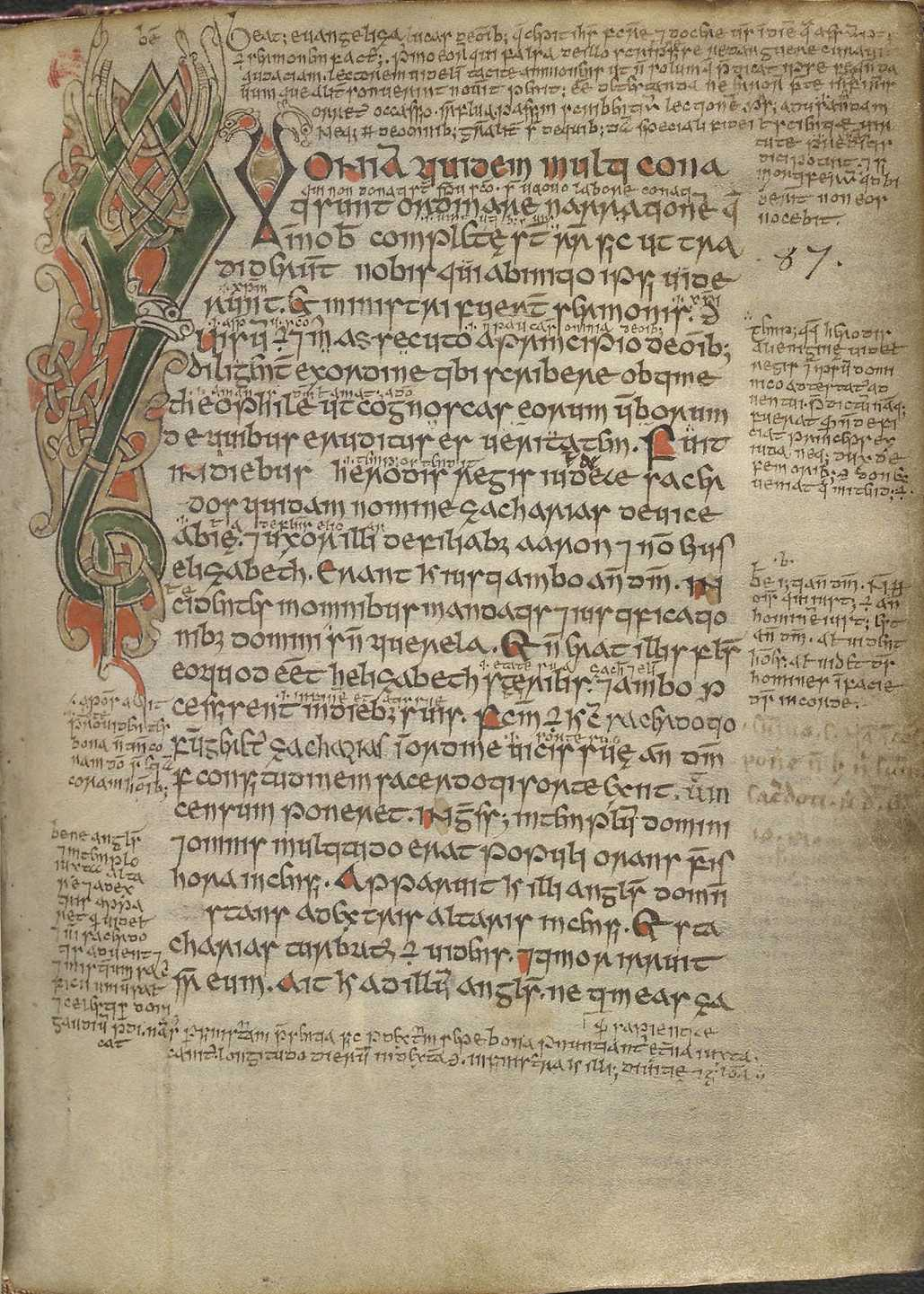
Folio 87 recto.

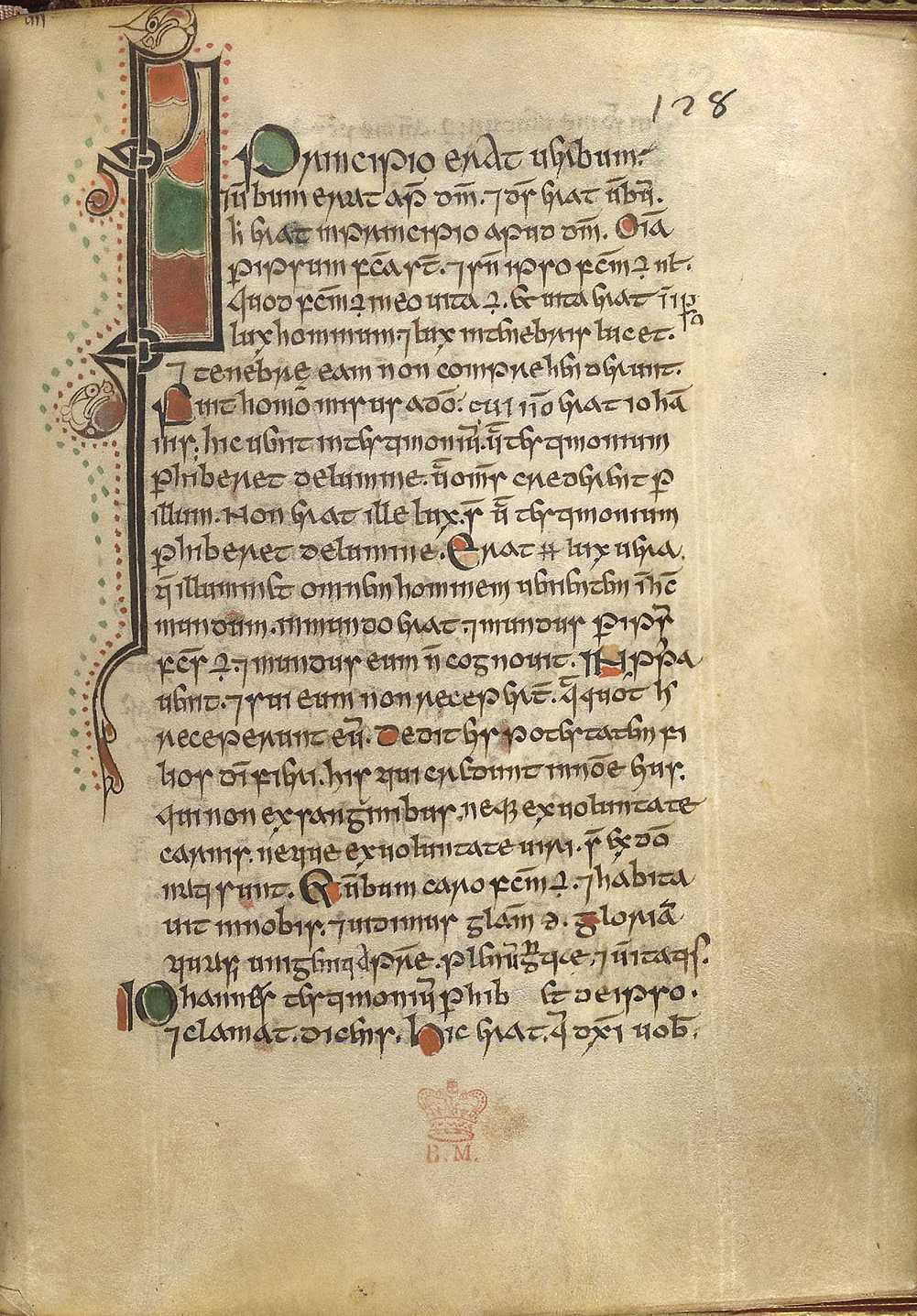
Folio 128 recto.
