= Richard Porson =

English classical scholar (1759–1808)

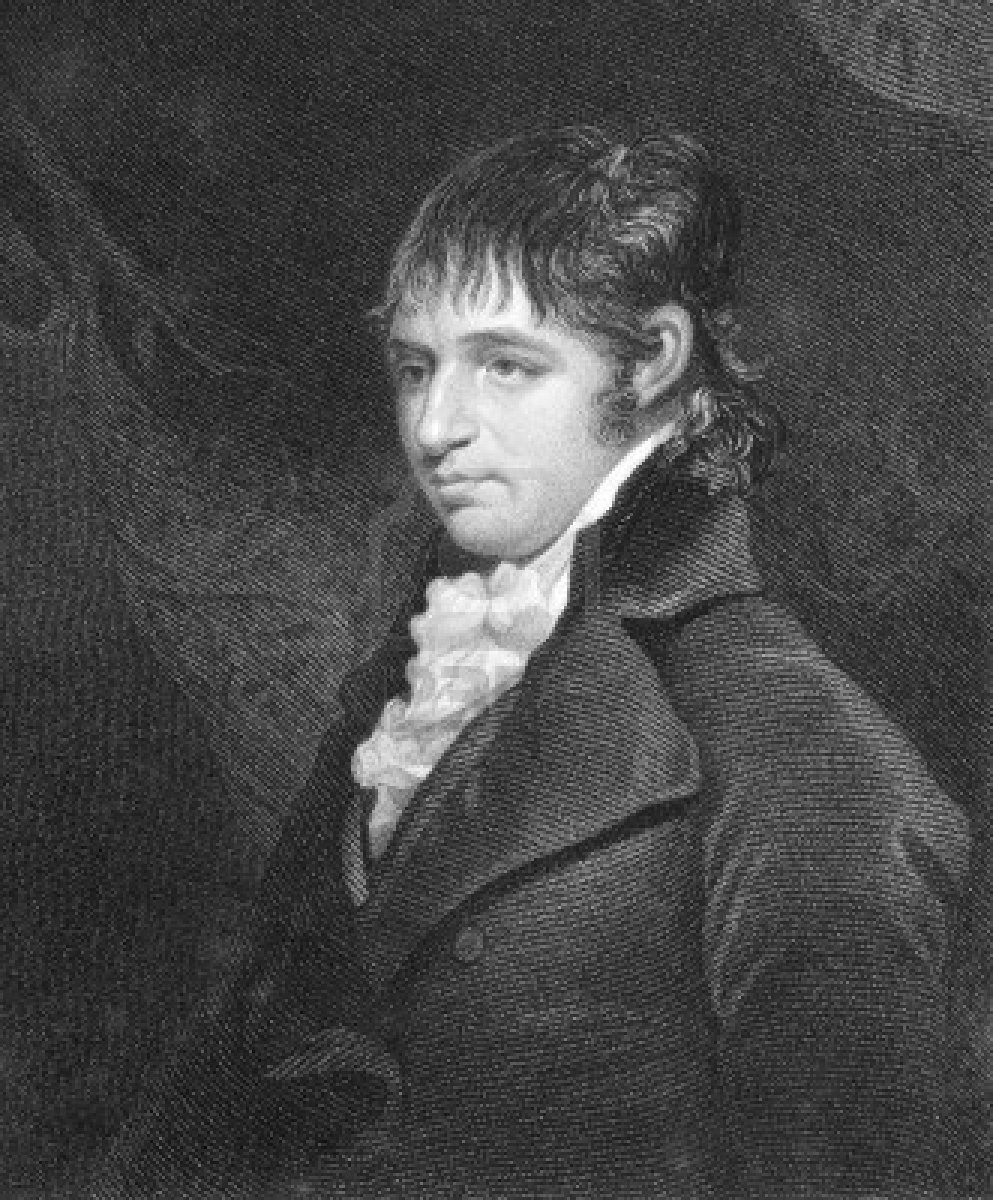
Richard Porson, after a picture by John Hoppner

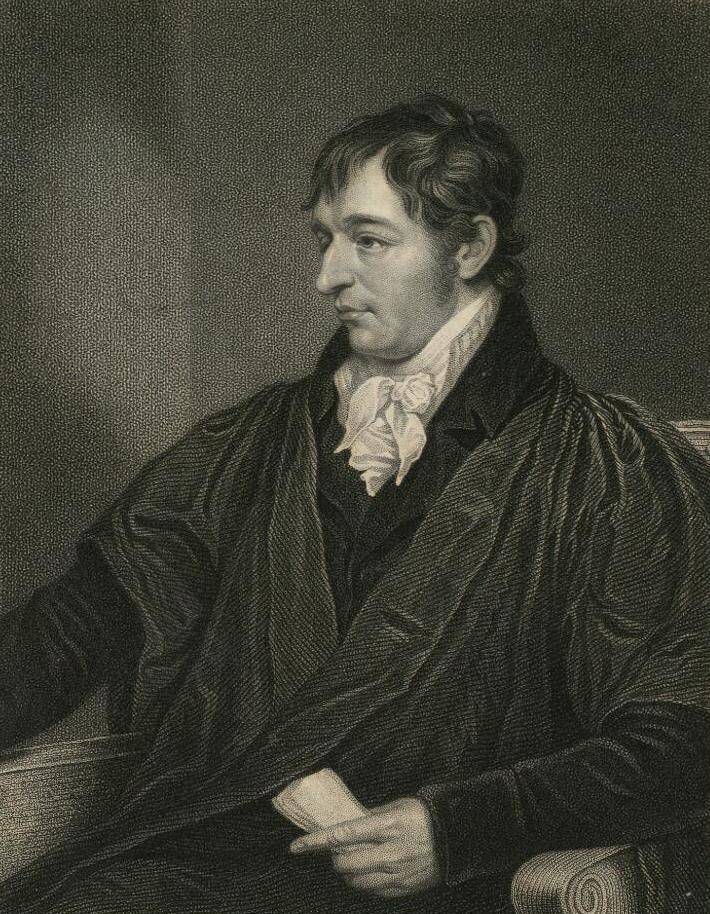
Portrait of Richard Porson, 1830

Richard Porson (25 December 1759 – 25 September 1808) was an English classical scholar. He was the discoverer of Porson's Law.

== Early life ==
Richard Porson was born at East Ruston, near North Walsham, Norfolk, the eldest son of Huggin Porson, a weaver and parish clerk. His mother Ann Palmer was the daughter of Thomas Palmer a shoemaker from the neighbouring village of Bacton. He was sent first to the Bacton village school, kept by John Woodrow, and then to that of Happisburgh, kept by Mr Summers, where his extraordinary powers of memory and aptitude for arithmetic were discovered. His literary skill was partly due to the efforts of Summers, who long afterwards stated that in fifty years of scholastic life he had never come across boys so clever as Porson and his two brothers. He was well grounded in Latin by Summers, remaining with him for three years. His father also took pains with his education, making him repeat at night the lessons he had learnt in the day. He would frequently repeat perfectly a lesson he had learnt one or two years before and never seen in the interval. For books he had only what his father's cottage supplied – a book or two of arithmetic, James Greenwood's An Essay towards a practical English Grammar, John Jewel's Apology of the Church of England, an odd volume of the Chambers' Cyclopaedia picked up from a wrecked coaster, and eight or ten volumes of The Universal Magazine of Knowledge and Pleasure.

== Education ==
When Porson was eleven, the rector of East Ruston took charge of his education. Thomas Hewitt taught him with his own boys, taking him through Julius Caesar, Terence, Ovid and Virgil; he had already made great progress in mathematics. In addition, Hewitt brought him to the notice of John Norris of Witton Park, who sent him to Cambridge to be examined by James Lambert, the two tutors of Trinity College, Cambridge (Thomas Postlethwaite and Collier), and the mathematician George Atwood, then assistant tutor; the result was so favourable that Norris decided in 1773 to provide for his education. It was impossible to get him into Charterhouse School and he was entered at Eton College in August 1774.

Porson did not care for Eton, but he was popular there; two dramas he wrote for performance in Long Chamber (the scholars' dormitory) were remembered. His memory was noticed; but he seems not to have lived up to expectations, as his composition was weak, and he fell behind through gaps in his knowledge. He went to Eton too late to have any chance of a scholarship at King's College, Cambridge. In 1777 his patron John Norris died; but contributions from Etonians helped fund his maintenance at the university, and he found a new patron in Sir George Baker, then president of the College of Physicians. With his help Porson entered Trinity College, Cambridge, as a pensioner (i. e. a student who paid for his tuition and board, rather than a sizar or scholar) on 28 March 1778, matriculating in April. What first set his mind towards literary criticism was the gift of a copy of Jonathan Toup's Longinus by the headmaster of Eton; but it was Richard Bentley and Richard Dawes to whom he looked as his immediate masters.

Porson became a scholar of Trinity in 1780, won the Craven university scholarship in 1781, and took his degree of BA in 1782, as third senior optime (i. e. with the third best result of those achieving a second-class degree in that year), obtaining soon afterwards the first Chancellor's Medal for classical studies. The same year he was elected a fellow of Trinity, an unusual appointment for a junior bachelor of arts, under a regulation which lasted until 1818. Porson graduated MA in 1785.

== Early published work ==
His first appearance in print was in a short notice of Christian Gottfried Schütz's Aeschylus in Paul Henry Maty's Review, written in 1783. This review contains several other essays by him, including those on Richard François Brunck's Aristophanes, Stephen Weston's Hermesianax, and George Isaac Huntingford's Apology for the Monostrophics. He also began a correspondence with David Ruhnken, the veteran scholar of Leiden, requesting fragments of Aeschylus that Ruhnken had come across in his collection of unpublished lexicons and grammarians, and sending him his restoration of a corrupt passage in the Supplices (673–677), with the help of a nearly equally corrupt passage of Plutarch's Eroticus.

The Cambridge University Press was proposing a new edition of Thomas Stanley's Aeschylus, and the editorship was offered to Porson; but he declined to reprint Stanley's corrupt text and incorporate the variorum notes. He was especially anxious that the Medicean manuscript at Florence should be collated for the new edition, and offered to undertake the collation; but the syndics refused the offer, the vice-chancellor John Torkington, master of Clare Hall (the then name of Clare College), observing that Porson might collect his manuscripts at home.

In 1786, a new edition of Thomas Hutchinson's Anabasis of Xenophon was called for, and Porson was asked by the publisher to supply notes, which he did in conjunction with Walter Whiter. These are a good example of the terse style of Latin notes he practised. They also show his acquaintance with his two favourite authors, Plato and Athenaeus, and a familiarity with Eustathius of Thessalonica's commentary on Homer.

The following year Porson wrote his Notae breves ad Toupii emendationes in Suidam, though this treatise did not appear until 1790 in the new edition of Jonathan Toup's book published at Oxford. These first made Porson's name known as a scholar and carried his fame beyond England. The letters he had from Christian Gottlob Heine and Johann Gottfried Jakob Hermann were preserved in the library of Trinity College.

During 1787 he wrote three letters on John Hawkins's Life of Johnson for the Gentleman's Magazine, which were reprinted by Thomas Kidd in his Tracts and Criticisms of Porson, and in a volume of Porson's Correspondence. They are specimens of dry humour, and allude to English dramatists and poets. In the same periodical during 1788 and 1789 appeared the Letters to Archdeacon Travis against George Travis, on a debated Biblical verse called the Comma Johanneum (1 John 5:7). Edward Gibbon's verdict on the book was that it was "the most acute and accurate piece of criticism since the days of Bentley." But it was then the unpopular side: the publisher is said to have lost money on the book; and one of his early friends, Mrs Turner of Norwich, cut down a legacy she had left Porson to £30 on being told that he had written a book against the Bible.

After 1787 Porson continued to contribute to the leading reviews, writing in the Monthly Review the articles on Joseph Robertson's Parian Chronicle, Thomas Edwards's Plutarch on Education, and Richard Payne Knight's Essay on the Greek Alphabet. He gave assistance to William Beloe in one or two articles in the British Critic, and probably wrote also in the Analytical Review and the Critical Review.

== Loss of fellowship ==
In 1792 his fellowship ceased to be tenable by a layman; and Porson decided not to take holy orders. The Master, Thomas Postlethwaite, who had the nomination to one of the two permanent lay fellowships, used his privilege to nominate John Heys, his nephew. Porson was without means of support, but a subscription was got up among his friends to provide an annuity; Cracherode, Cleaver Banks, Burney and Samuel Parr took the lead, and enough was collected to produce about £100 a year. He accepted it on the condition that he should receive the interest during his lifetime and that the principal should be returned to the donors on his death. When this occurred, part of the sum was used to found the Porson Prize in 1816 at Cambridge, and the remainder for the foundation of the Porson Scholarship, first awarded in 1855.

He continued chiefly to reside in London, in chambers in Essex Court, Temple, London — occasionally visiting his friends, such as Joseph Goodall at Eton College and Samuel Parr at Hatton, Warwickshire. It was at Goodall's house that the Letters to Travis were written. At Hatton, in the evenings, he would collect the young men of the house about him and pour forth from memory torrents of literature. In 1792 the Regius Greek Professorship at Cambridge became vacant with the resignation of William Cooke. Porson was elected without opposition and held the chair until his death. The duties consisted of taking part in the examinations for the university scholarships and classical medals. It was said that he wished to give lectures, but lecturing was not in fashion at the time.

== Later work ==
Porson worked mainly on the tragedians, Aristophanes, Athenaeus, and the lexicons of Suidas, Hesychius and Photius. This last he twice transcribed (the first transcript was destroyed by a fire at James Perry's house) from the original among the Gale manuscripts in the library of Trinity College, Cambridge. He was pleased when he found how often in Aristophanes he had been anticipated by Bentley, and when Niels Iversen Schow's collation of the unique manuscripts of Hesychius appeared and proved him right in some instances.

In 1795 there appeared from Foulis's press at Glasgow an edition of Aeschylus in folio, printed with the same type as the Glasgow Homer, without a word of preface or any clue to the editor. Many new readings were inserted in the text with an asterisk affixed, while an obelus was used to mark many others as corrupt. It was at once recognised as Porson's work; he had superintended the printing of a small edition in two octavo volumes, but this was kept back by the printer and not issued till 1806, still without the editor's name. It was printed from a copy of Jan Cornelis de Pauw's edition corrected, which is preserved in the library of Trinity College.

Soon after, in 1797, appeared the first instalment of what was intended to be a complete edition of Euripides–an edition of the Hecuba.

=== Reception ===
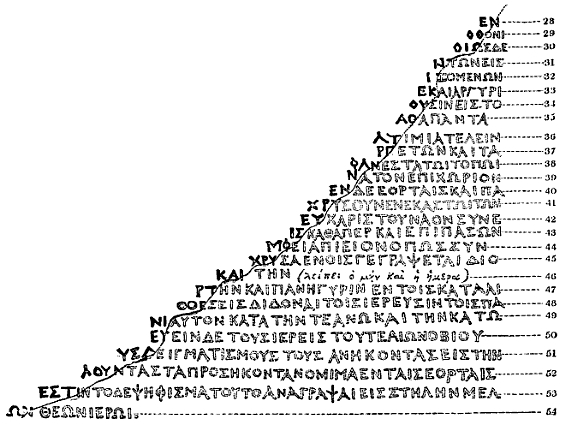
Porson's suggested reconstruction of the missing Greek text of the Rosetta Stone

Porson's work did not escape attack. Gilbert Wakefield had published a Tragoediarum delectus. Conceiving himself slighted, as there was no mention of his work in the new Hecuba, he wrote a diatribe extemporalis against it. Gottfried Hermann of Leipzig had also written a work on Greek metres and issued an edition of the Hecuba, in which Porson's theories were attacked. Porson at first took no notice of either, but went on with his Euripides, publishing the Orestes in 1798, the Phoenissae in 1799 and the Medea in 1801, the last printed at the Cambridge press, and with the editor's name on the title page. But there are many allusions to his antagonists in the notes; and in the Medea he holds Hermann to scorn by name in caustic language. Hermann's attack may have provoked the supplement to the preface to the Hecuba, in the second edition published at Cambridge in 1802. There the laws of the iambic metre are fully explained. A third edition of the Hecuba appeared in 1808, and he left corrected copies of the other plays, of which new editions appeared soon after his death; but these four plays were all that was finished of the projected edition of the poet.

Porson lived six years after the second edition of the Hecuba was published, but he put off the work. He found time, however, to execute his collation of the Harleian manuscript of the Odyssey, published in the Grenville Homer in 1801, and to present to the Society of Antiquaries his conjectural restoration of the Rosetta Stone.

== Later life and death ==
In 1806, when the London Institution was founded in Old Jewry, Porson was appointed principal librarian, with a salary of £200 a year and a suite of rooms. This assured him financial ease in his latter years.

Among his intimate friends was James Perry, editor of The Morning Chronicle. He married Perry's sister, Mrs Lunan, in November 1796. Porson then drank less; but she died a few months after her marriage (12 April 1797), and he returned to his chambers in the Temple and his old habits. Perry's friendship induced him to spend his time in writing for The Morning Chronicle.

For some months before his death he had appeared to be failing; his memory was not what it had been, and he had some symptoms of intermittent fever, but on 19 September 1808 he was seized in the street with a fit of apoplexy, and after partially recovering, died on the 25th. He was buried in Trinity College Chapel, close to the statue of Newton, at the opposite end of the chapel to the remains of Richard Bentley.

== Legacy ==
Porson did not discriminate between the manuscripts he used or point out the relative value of early copies. Thus he collates minutely Lascaris's edition of the Medea, mentioning even misprints in the text. His most brilliant emendations are convincing.

His library was divided into two parts, one of which was sold by auction, while the other, containing the transcript of the Gale Photius, his books with his notes, and some letters from foreign scholars, was bought by Trinity College for 1000 guineas. His notebooks were careful; they have been rearranged, and illustrate his penmanship. Much remains unpublished. James Henry Monk, his successor as Greek professor, and Charles James Blomfield edited the Adversaria, consisting of the notes on Athenaeus and the Greek poets, and his prelection on Euripides; Peter Paul Dobree, afterwards Greek professor, the notes on Aristophanes and the lexicon of Photius. Besides these, from other sources, Thomas Gaisford edited his notes on Pausanias and Suidas, and Thomas Kidd collected his scattered reviews. When Thomas Burgess attacked his literary character over his Letters to Travis, Thomas Turton came forward to defend him.

For the first thirty years of the 19th century, he was often regarded as the author of a very popular poem, The Devil's Thoughts (later entitled The Devil's Walk). It was actually written by Robert Southey and Samuel Taylor Coleridge.

The Greek typeface Porson, commonly used in publications from the early nineteenth century to the early twentieth century, was based on his handwriting.

== Works ==
The dates of Porson's published works are these:

- Notae in Xenophontis anabasin (1786)
- Appendix to Toup (1790)
- Letters to Travis (1790)
- Aeschylus (1795, 1806)
- Euripides (1797–1802)
- collation of the Harleian manuscript of the Odyssey (1801)
- Adversaria (Monk and Blomfield, 1812)
- Tracts and Criticisms (Kidd, 1815)
- Aristophanica (Dobree, 1820)
- Notae in Pausaniam (Gaisford, 1820)
- Photii lexicon (Dobree, 1822)
- Notae in Suidam (Gaisford, 1834)
- Correspondence (H. R. Luard, edited for the Cambridge Antiquarian Society, 1867)

Dr. Turton's vindication appeared in 1827.

== See also ==
- Porson (typeface)
