= Richard Dawes (classical scholar) =

English classical scholar (1708–1766)

Richard Dawes (1708 – 21 March 1766) was an English classical scholar.

== Life ==
He was born in or near Market Bosworth, Leicestershire, England, and was educated at the town's grammar school under Anthony Blackwall, and at Emmanuel College, Cambridge, of which he was elected fellow in 1731. His eccentricities and frank speaking made him unpopular. His health broke down as a result of his sedentary life, and he took to bell-ringing at Great St Mary's as exercise. He was a bitter enemy of Richard Bentley, who he declared knew nothing of Greek except from indexes.

In 1738, Dawes was appointed to the mastership of the Royal Free Grammar School, Newcastle upon Tyne, combined with that of St Mary's Hospital. His mind seems to have become unhinged; his continual disputes with his governing body ruined the school, and in 1749, he resigned and retired to Heworth, where he spent most of his time boating.

== Works ==
The book on which Dawes' fame rests is his Miscellanea critica (1745), which gained the commendation of L. C. Valckenaer and Johann Jakob Reiske. The Miscellanea, which was re-edited by Thomas Burgess (1781), Gottlieb Christoph Harless (1800) and Thomas Kidd (1817), for many years enjoyed a high reputation. Some of the "canons" proved untenable and few were accepted universally; but it remains a monument of English scholarship.
