= Collections of the British Library =

The collections of the British Library, a research library in London, include items from across the world and from throughout human history.

== 1300 BC – 500 AD ==
- More than 450 Chinese oracle bones from the Shang dynasty, the oldest artefacts in the British Library (1300–1050 BC)
- Constitution of Athenians, papyrus work describing the constitution of Classical Athens by Aristotle or one of his pupils, from Hermopolis, Egypt (78–100 AD)
- Seven fragmented scrolls from the Herculaneum papyri that survived the Eruption of Mount Vesuvius, (before 79 AD)
- De bellis macedonicis, fragment of a Latin Codex recording the Macedonian Wars in an early form of uncial script (1st–2nd centuries AD)
- Early manuscript copies of the ancient Greek plays Ichneutae by Sophocles and Iliad by Homer, part of the Oxyrhynchus Papyri (2nd century AD)
- Gandhāran Buddhist texts, some of the oldest Buddhist manuscripts yet discovered (1st–3rd centuries AD)
- Bankes Homer, one of the longest and best preserved papyri of Homer's literary works surviving from antiquity, containing the bulk of the text of the final book of the Iliad (2nd century AD)
- Egerton Gospel, one of the two earliest preserved papyrus witnesses to the Christian gospel tradition (2nd century AD)
- Sixty-six Indian charters on copper plates, including those from Chamak and two similar groups of plates from Java, (1st century BC – 13th century AD)
- Fragments of the Spitzer Manuscript, the oldest surviving manuscript in Sanskrit discovered so far, from the Kizil Caves, China (200–230 AD)
- Gospel of John Papyrus, early copy of the Gospel according to John from the New Testament, discovered in Oxyrhynchus, Egypt (250 AD)
- Sogdian Ancient Letters, the earliest substantial texts written in Sogdian, the language formerly spoken in the area around Samarkand in present-day Uzbekistan and Tajikistan (313–314 AD)
- Codex Sinaiticus, the major portion of the world's second-oldest manuscript of the Bible in koine Greek (330–360 AD)
- Letters of Cyprian, three fragments from St Cyprian's epistles in uncial script, part of a Latin Codex from Carthage, north Africa (late 4th century AD)
- Codex Alexandrinus, early manuscript of the Greek Bible containing the majority of the Old Testament and New Testament and one of the four Great uncial codices (400–440 AD)
- Jacob Manuscript, the second oldest extant Syriac manuscript and the oldest codex bearing a date in any language, handwritten by the scribe Jacob (411 AD)
- Curetonian Gospels, manuscript of the four gospels of the New Testament in Old Syriac (c. 450–470 AD)
- Fragments of the Cotton Genesis, luxury illuminated manuscript copy of the Book of Genesis and one of the oldest illustrated biblical codices to survive to the modern period (4th to 5th centuries AD)
- Leaf from the Codex Palatinus, Latin Gospel Book written on purple dyed vellum in gold and silver ink (5th century AD)
- Maunggun gold plates, two gold strips found at Maunggun near Sri Ksetra, inscribed in the ancient Pyu script and among the earliest Buddhist texts discovered in Myanmar, donated by Sir Frederick Fryer, Lieutenant-Governor of Burma (5th century AD)
- Seven folios of a manuscript containing the Sanskrit text of the Lotus Sutra in Sharada script from Gilgit, the earliest paper manuscript from South Asia (5th–7th centuries AD)
- Earliest Syriac manuscript with the complete Peshitta text of the New Testament (5th–6th centuries AD)

== 500–800 AD ==
- Earliest dated Syriac manuscript of the two Gospels and the Peshitta Apostolos, Syriac manuscripts of the Peshitta or Syriac Bible (528–534)
- Codex Harleianus or Harley Latin Gospels, one of the earliest manuscripts of the Gospels in Latin, Italy (550)
- Codex Nitriensis, Greek New Testament codex containing the Gospel of Luke from the Monastery of St. Mary Deipara in the Nitrian Desert, Egypt (c. 550)
- Ravenna Papyrus, 2.5m long papyrus scroll in Latin cursive script with contract for the sale of a property in Ravenna, Italy (dated 3 June 572)
- Four leaves from the Codex Purpureus Petropolitanus, a Greek manuscript of the Gospels written on purple parchment in silver and gold ink (6th century)
- Golden Cannon Tables, Byzantine illuminated Gospel made in Constantinople before the Iconoclasm period (6th century)
- Dunhuang Go Manual, the earliest surviving manuscript on the strategic board game of Go from Dunhuang, China (6th century)
- Askew Codex, unique manuscript in the Coptic script, one of three surviving codices containing full copies of all of the gnostic writings (c. 6th century)
- Three folios from the Uncial 070, a Greek-Coptic diglot uncial manuscript of the New Testament from the White Monastery in Egypt (6th Century)
- Manuscript copies of the Laṅkāvatāra Sūtra in the Chinese and Tibetan languages from Dunhuang in China (7th to 9th centuries)
- Ceolfrid Bible, fragment of one of the three single-volume Bibles ordered by Ceolfrid and closely related to the Codex Amiatinus (late 7th – early 8th centuries)
- Dunhuang Star Chart, one of the first known graphical representations of stars from ancient Chinese astronomy (700)
- Lindisfarne Gospels, illuminated Latin Gospel book from Anglo-Saxon Northumbria, one of the finest examples of Hiberno-Saxon or Insular art (715–720)
- Royal Athelstan Gospels, Anglo-Saxon illuminated Gospel Book with Merovingian decoration, closely related to the Lindisfarne Gospels (700–749)
- St Cuthbert Gospel, a Northumbrian gospel book with the oldest Western binding (early 8th century)
- Codex Beneventanus, illuminated codex containing a Gospel Book for the Monastery of San Vincenzo al Volturno near Benevento, Italy (739–760)
- Hyakumantō Darani or the "One Million Pagodas and Dharani Prayers", the earliest surviving examples of printing in Japan (764–770)
- Tiberius Bede, illuminated manuscript of Bede's Historia ecclesiastica gentis Anglorum, produced at Monkwearmouth–Jarrow Abbey (8th century)
- Otho-Corpus Gospels, fragments of an insular Gospel Book, the best preserved page representing an Evangelist portrait of the Lion of Saint Mark (8th century)
- Vespasian Psalter, Anglo-Saxon illuminated psalter decorated in Insular style, belonging to a group of manuscripts from southern England known as the Tiberius group, which includes the Tiberius Bede and the Book of Nunnaminster (late 8th century)
- London Gospel Book, illuminated Pocket Book of the Four Gospels with Evangelist portraits, made in Ireland with later Anglo-Saxon additions (late 8th century)
- Moralia in Job by St Gregory, and Theological Works of St Augustine of Hippo, St Jerome and Commodianus, two theological manuscripts produced in Laon, France and Nonantola Italy respectively (late 8th century)
- Mozarabic Chronicle, Visigothic minuscule written by Mozarab chronicler in Al-Andalus, with the earliest known reference in Latin to "Europeans" (europenses) (late 8th century)
- One of the oldest and most complete surviving Qur'an codices in the world, produced in the Hijazi script in the Hijaz region of Arabia where the holy places of Mecca and Medina are. (8th century)

== 800–1000 AD ==
- Schuttern Gospels, an early illuminated gospel book produced in Baden, Germany (early 9th century)
- Aethelstan Psalter, small book of psalms made near Reims, once owned by King Æthelstan of Wessex and given by him to Winchester Cathedral (early 9th century)
- Durham Liber Vitae, confraternity book, recording the names of visitors to the church of the bishopric of Durham, and its predecessor sees at Lindisfarne and Chester-le-Street (early 9th century)
- Harley Golden Gospels, Carolingian illuminated manuscript written in gold ink, produced in Aachen, Germany (800–825)
- Earliest surviving copy of Vitruvius's De architectura, Carolingian manuscript made at the scriptorium attached to the court of Charlemagne in Aachen, Germany (800–825)
- Old Tibetan Annals, the earliest surviving historical document in Old Tibetan, covering the period from 643 to 764 AD (800–840)
- Harley Aratea, Carolingian copy of Phaenomena Aratea by the Greek poet Aratus, with 22 full-page representations of the constellations in text or scholia within the shapes, from Rheims, France (820)
- Fridugisus Gospel Book, illuminated Carolingian Latin Gospel Book produced at Tours under the abbacy of Fridugisus with original treasure binding (820–830)
- Bible from Moutier-Grandval Abbey, one of three illustrated bibles containing the text of the Vulgate made at the scriptorium of Tours in the ninth century, France (840)
- Lothair Psalter, sumptuous Carolingian manuscript with original binding furnishing a large silver-gilt medallion of the Emperor Lothair I (840–855)
- An early copy of the Qur'an in Kufic script, with beginnings of elements of Arabic illumination and decoration, possibly from al-Kufah, Iraq (850)
- Diamond Sutra, the world's earliest-dated printed book printed during the Tang dynasty (868)
- Codex Ulmensis, manuscript in Caroline minuscule containing the Epistles and Revelation, produced at the monastic centre under Abbot Harmut in St Gallen, Switzerland (872–878)
- Bodmin Gospels, illuminated gospel-book copied in Brittany and owned by the Priory of St Petroc in Bodmin, Cornwall, with recording of the freeing of slaves entered on some pages (875)
- Anglo-Saxon copy of Orosius's Historiae Adversus Paganos with enlarged zoomorphic initials, produced at the scriptorium in Winchester Cathedral, England (892–925)
- Marmoutiers Gospel Book, illuminated manuscript mixing Insular and Carolingian styles produced in Brittany or Tours, western France (late 9th century)
- Codex Seidelianus I, Greek uncial manuscript of the Gospels containing 252 parchment leaves (9th century)
- Irq Bitig or Book of Omens from the Mogao Caves in Dunhuang, China, the only known complete manuscript text written in the Old Turkic script (9th century)
- Gospels of Elisha, Armenian gospels commissioned by Lord Elisha, one of the earliest gospels written in the Armenian language (c. 900)
- Coronation Gospels, Ottonian illuminated Gospel book gifted to King Athelstan (late 9th or early 10th centuries)
- Testament of Ba, manuscript written in Old Tibetan marking the establishment of Vajrayana Buddhism in Tibet and the foundation of the Samye Monastery during the reign of King Trisong Detsen (9th–10th centuries)
- Passionarium Hispanicum, illuminated Passional manuscript in Visigothic minuscule from the Monastery of San Pedro de Cardeña near Burgos, northern Spain, (911 AD)
- Guest-Coutts New Testament, Byzantine illuminated manuscript of the New Testament in Greek, with silver-gilt cover, Constantinople (mid 10th century)
- Bald's Leechbook or Medicinale Anglicum, unique Anglo-Saxon manuscript pertaining to medical remedies, diagnoses and charms (mid 10th century)
- Benedictional of St. Æthelwold, the most important surviving work of the Anglo-Saxon Winchester School of illumination (963–984)
- New Minster Charter, Anglo-Saxon illuminated manuscript with gold lettering, commissioned by Bishop Æthelwold and presented to the New Minster in Winchester by King Edgar to commemorate the Benedictine Reform (966)
- Lei feng ta scroll, early printed document found walled up in the Leifeng Pagoda in Hangzhou, China (975)
- Ramsey Psalter, Anglo-Saxon illuminated psalter made for use at the Benedictine monastery of Ramsey Abbey for its founder St Oswald (late 10th century)
- Bosworth Psalter, oldest English manuscript that includes all of the important texts of the Benedictine Office, from Bosworth Hall, Leicestershire (late 10th century)
- The sole surviving manuscript copy of the poem Beowulf, one of four extant Anglo-Saxon poetry manuscripts (975–1025)
- London Codex and First Gaster Bible: two of the oldest surviving Hebrew biblical codices, Palestine and Egypt (10th century)
- Xuastvanift, a confessional book of Manichaean Uyghurs, one of the most complete manuscripts among the Old Uyghur Manichaean texts (1000)

== 1000–1200 AD ==
- Illustrated copy of Prudentius's Psychomachia or "Battle of the Soul", the first allegorical work in European literature (late 10th-early 11th centuries)
- Seven of the nine surviving manuscripts of the Anglo-Saxon Chronicle (10th–12th centuries)
- Hemming's Cartulary, manuscript cartulary or collection of charters and other land records, collected by a monk named Hemming at Worcester Cathedral around the time of the Norman conquest of England (10th–12th centuries)
- Burney Gospels, illuminated copy of the Greek Gospels by the Kokkinobaphos Master, once owned by the imperial Comnenus family in Constantinople (10th–12th centuries)
- Grimbald Gospels, luxury gospel-book with gold initials and silver decoration made by Eadwig Basan, a monk at Christ Church, Canterbury, named after Grimbald of Saint-Bertin who was recommended in a letter that accompanied the volume to King Alfred the Great by Fulk, archbishop of Reims (1012–1023)
- Manuscript copy of Liber Scintillarum or Book of Sparks, patristic anthology of biblical sayings in Latin from Rochester Cathedral (1015)
- Harley Psalter, earliest of three surviving medieval copies of the Carolingian Utrecht Psalter (1020–1040)
- Harley Echternach Gospels and Egerton Echternach Gospels, two lavishly illuminated Gospel Books produced at the Benedictine Abbey of St Willibrord in Echternach, Luxembourg, (1025–1075)
- New Minster Liber Vitae, confraternity book produced in Winchester recording the names of visitors to the New Minster with a celebrated image of King Cnut the Great and Queen Emma of Normandy (1031)
- Encomium Emmae Reginae, lavishly illustrated Latin encomium in honour of Queen Emma of Normandy, consort of kings Æthelred the Unready and Cnut the Great of England, and mother of kings Harthacnut and Edward the Confessor (1041)
- Odalricus Peccator Lectionary, illuminated lectionary with gold inscriptions by Odalricus Peccator at Lorsch Abbey, Germany (1000–1050)
- Tiberius Psalter and Stowe Psalter, two of four surviving Gallican psalters produced at the New Minster, Winchester in the years around the Norman conquest of England (c. 1050)
- Theodore Psalter, one of the richest illuminated manuscripts to survive from Byzantium (1066)
- Codex of the Lives of the Saints in the Georgian script from the Holy Cross Monastery, Jerusalem, including unique copies of works by Cyril of Scythopolis and Athanasius of Alexandria (11th century)
- Old English Hexateuch, late Anglo-Saxon period translation of the six books of the Hexateuch into Old English, made under the tutelage of Ælfric of Eynsham (11th century)
- Giant medieval bibles such as the Arnstein Bible, Floreffe Bible, Montpellier Bible, Parc Abbey Bible, Rochester Bible, Stavelot Bible and Worms Bible (11th–12th centuries)
- Latin–Old Cornish Glossary, an early Cornish-Latin glossary with the oldest complete text in the Cornish language (11th–12th centuries)
- Mar Saba Psalter, Byzantine Book of Psalms with full-page miniatures from the Monastery of Mar Saba near Jerusalem, (1090 AD)
- Silos Apocalypse, commentary on the Book of Revelation from Santo Domingo de Silos near Burgos, northern Spain (1091–1109)
- Préaux Gospels, luxury copy of the Four Gospels produced under the leadership of abbot Richard of Fourneaux, a student of Saint Anselm, at the Benedictine abbey of St Pierre in Préaux, Normandy (early 12th century)
- Shaftesbury Psalter, illuminated Book of Psalms made for use at the Benedictine nunnery of Shaftesbury Abbey in Dorset, perhaps originally owned by Queen Adeliza of Louvain, widow of Henry I of England (1125–1150)
- Cartulary of Quimperlé from the abbey of the Holy Cross at Quimperlé, important source for the history of Brittany during the Middle Ages (1125–1150)
- Melisende Psalter, illuminated manuscript commissioned in the crusader Kingdom of Jerusalem for Queen Melisende (c. 1135)
- Gospels of Máel Brigte or Armagh Gospels, illuminated Gospel Book produced by a scribe named Máel Brigte úa Máel Úanaig in Armagh, Ireland (1138–1139)
- Leaf from the Eadwine Psalter, one of the most decorated psalters from medieval England, named after the scribe Eadwine, a monk from Canterbury Cathedral (1155–1160)
- Gospels of Simeon, gospels written in an early form of the Armenian script or Erkatagir by a monk named Simeon, collected by the traveller William B. Barker (1166)
- Fragment of the luxurious Psalter of Henry the Lion with text written in gold on purple parchment and scenes of months and zodiac signs (1168–1189)
- Guthlac Roll, strip of parchment containing 18 roundels depicting the life of the Anglo-Saxon saint, from Crowland Abbey, Lincolnshire (1175–1215)
- Winchester Psalter, Romanesque illuminated psalter made for Henry of Blois, brother of King Stephen (12th century)
- The General's Garden scroll, unique manuscript translation in the Tangut language and script of a Chinese military text, collected from the abandoned fortress city of Khara-Khoto by Aurel Stein in 1914 (12th century)
- Annals of Egmond Abbey, the earliest manuscript copy in Latin of the annals from Egmond Abbey, a significant source for the early history of the Netherlands (late 12th/early 13th centuries)

== 1200–1300 AD ==
- Avag Vank Gospels, lavishly illuminated manuscript of the Four Gospels in the Armenian language, eastern Turkey (1200–01)
- Westminster Psalter, illuminated manuscript commissioned by the Abbot of Westminster and the oldest surviving psalter used at Westminster Abbey (c. 1200)
- Tacuinum Sanitatis, "The Maintenance of Health", a medical digest composed by Ibn Butlan in Arabic for al-Malik al-Ẓāhir, son of Saladin (1213)
- Two first edition copies of Magna Carta out of 4 remaining copies (1215)
- Rochester Bestiary, richly illuminated manuscript of a medieval bestiary, a book describing the appearance and habits of familiar and exotic animals, both real and legendary, Rochester, Kent (1220–1230)
- Reissue of the Charter of the Forest that re-established for free men rights of access to the royal forest (1225)
- Annals of Boyle, Irish medieval chronicle from Trinity Island on Lough Key near Boyle, County Roscommon (1235)
- Part of the Oxford-Paris-London Bible moralisée, luxury illuminated manuscript commissioned by Blanche of Castile for Margaret of Provence (1230–45)
- De Brailes Hours, earliest surviving English Book of Hours, once owned by Charles Dyson Perrins (1240)
- Mahzor Vitry, liturgical manuscript written in Ashkenazic script, unique compendium of Jewish prayers for the entire year according to the north French rite and a host of laws on everyday practices (1242)
- Felbrigge Psalter, illuminated manuscript with the earliest embroidered bookbinding on an English book, from Felbrigg Hall, Norfolk (mid 13th century)
- Third part of the Chronica Majora or history of the world by Matthew Paris, Benedictine monk and celebrated historian from St Albans Abbey (1254–1259)
- Rutland Psalter, earliest extant example of an English Psalter with extensive marginal imagery, London (1260)
- Sumer is icumen in, manuscript copy of a musical composition composed at Reading Abbey, oldest known musical round yet discovered, with Middle English words (1261–1265)
- Chronicles of Mann, medieval Latin manuscript relating the early history of the Isle of Man (1262)
- Oscott Psalter, English manuscript with scenes from the Bible and some of the most striking paintings of the period (1265–1270)
- Dering Roll, the oldest English roll of arms surviving in its original form (1270–80)
- Grandisson Psalter, once owned by John Grandisson, Bishop of Exeter and bequeathed to Princess Isabella, eldest daughter of King Edward III (1270–80)
- Hispano-Moresque Haggadah, illuminated Passover Haggadah manuscript with 66 full-page illustrations depicting episodes from the Book of Exodus, made in Castile, Spain (1280)
- Coldingham Breviary, illuminated liturgical book made for Coldingham Priory, Berwickshire (1275–80)
- The Owl and the Nightingale, one of the earliest substantial texts to be written in Middle English (1275–1300)
- North French Hebrew Miscellany, important Hebrew illuminated manuscript containing a wide range of Hebrew language texts (1278–98)
- Alphonso Psalter, ornate illuminated manuscript made for Prince Alphonso, son of Edward I and Eleanor of Castile, for his betrothal to Margaret, daughter of Floris V, Count of Holland and Zeeland (1284)
- Collection of Mishnah commentaries by Rabbinic scholar Isaac ben Melchizedek from Siponto, Italy (1287–1288)
- Copy of Sultan Walad's Ibtidānamah, said in a note by the Mughal prince Dara Shikoh to be an autograph copy (1298)
- Gospel Lectionary of Sainte-Chapelle, illuminated collection of Gospel passages read during mass-produced for the Sainte-Chapelle, Paris (late 13th century)
- Fécamp Bible, largely intact illuminated bible originally from the Abbey of Fécamp, Normandy (late 13th century)
- Copy of Abd al-Raḥmān al-Ṣūfī's Kitāb Ṣuwar al-kawākib al-thābitah, an illustrated description of the 48 classical constellations in Ptolemy's Almagest (13th century)
- Chronicle of Melrose, medieval chronicle written by monks at Melrose Abbey with the earliest independent account of the sealing of Magna Carta (late 13th century)
- Percy Psalter-Hours, rare and early example of an illuminated devotional book from York, northern England (late 13th century)
- Rare manuscript of a Qur'ān in maghribi script from Al-Andalus, Volume 39 of 60 volumes, originally produced in Granada, Spain (13th century)

== 1300–1400 AD ==
- One of the Grandes Chroniques de France, once owned by John II of France, vernacular royal compilation of the history of France (1300–1399)
- Duke of Sussex's German Pentateuch, Hebrew manuscript richly decorated with mythical beasts in the margins, southern Germany (c. 1300)
- The Gwentian Code of the Welsh Law or Book of Cyfnerth, medieval legal manuscript in Welsh produced in Neath, south Wales (1300–1325)
- Tripartite Maḥzor, one of three volumes from a festival prayer book for the Feast of Weeks and Feast of the Tabernacles, written in Hebrew in southern Germany (1300–1329)
- Breviary of Renaud de Bar, originally owned by Reginald of Bar, Bishop of Metz (1302–1303)
- Mamluk Sultan Baybars II's seven-volume Qur'an written in gold in thuluth script, the earliest dated Qur'an from the Mamluk period, Cairo (1304–06)
- Part 25 of the Qur'ān commissioned by the Ilkhanate ruler Sultan Öljaitü, written in a fine gold muhaqqaq script with illuminated frontispiece. Mosul, Iraq (1310–1311)
- Original manuscript of the Ordinances of 1311, series of regulations imposed upon King Edward II by the nobility and clergy (1311)
- Val-Dieu Apocalypse, richly illuminated Gothic manuscript of the Book of Revelation, one of four extant examples of the "Norman Apocalypses" (1320s)
- Stowe Breviary, illuminated manuscript breviary from England, providing divine office according to the Sarum Ordinal and calendar (1320–1330)
- Hours of Saint-Omer, illuminated book of hours produced in Saint-Omer, northern France for the use of Marguerite de Beaujeu (1320–1330)
- Taymouth Hours, illuminated Book of Hours produced in England with unusually rich decoration, named after Taymouth Castle in Scotland where it was kept for centuries (1325–1335)
- Illuminated manuscript of Roman de Brut in Norman French by Wace, the earliest surviving vernacular chronicle of British history, with the earliest depiction of Stonehenge (1325–1350)
- Psalter of Queen Philippa, illuminated manuscript probably made as a gift for Philippa of Hainault to mark her marriage to Edward III of England (1328)
- Holkham Bible with illustrated collection of biblical and apocryphal stories in Norman French, from Holkham Hall, Norfolk (1327–1335)
- Regia Carmina, address in verse to Robert of Anjou, King of Naples from the town of Prato in Tuscany, written by Convenevole da Prato and illuminated by Pacino di Buonaguida (1335–1340)
- An early manuscript of the Samaritan Pentateuch, containing basic text of the first five books of the Hebrew Bible in the Samaritan script, Damascus, Syria (1339)
- Smithfield Decretals, copy of the glossed Decretals of Pope Gregory IX, renowned for its extraordinary programme of marginal illumination, once owned by St Bartholomew-the-Great church in Smithfield (1340)
- Golden Haggadah, Barcelona Haggadah, Sister Haggadah and Brother Haggadah, four illuminated manuscripts for the Jewish Passover from Catalonia (early 14th century)
- Gorleston Psalter, illuminated manuscript containing early music instruction and humorous marginalia (early 14th century)
- Queen Mary Psalter, Luttrell Psalter and Howard Psalter and Hours, three lavishly illuminated Gothic manuscripts (early 14th century)
- Illustrated copy of ʿAjā'ib al-makhlūqāt wa gharā'ib al-mawjūdāt or "Wonders of Creation" by Zakariya al-Qazwini (early 14th century)
- Maastricht Hours, book of hours made in Liège, remarkable for its large number of vibrant illuminations (early 14th century)
- Liber astrologiae (Liber Albumazarus, Abū Maʿshar Treatise), richly illustrated Latin compilation of astrological writings by Georgius Zothorus Zaparus Fendulus (mid-14th century)
- Kildare Poems, group of sixteen poems written in an Irish dialect of Middle English, one of the earliest manuscripts in Irish English, Kildare, Ireland (c. 1350)
- Serres Gospels, made by Kalist Rasoder for Jakov of Serres and written in the Serbian recension of Church Slavonic (1354)
- Gospels of Tsar Ivan Alexander, the most important medieval Bulgarian manuscript (1355–1356)
- Robertsbridge Codex, earliest surviving music manuscript written specifically for keyboard, Robertsbridge, East Sussex (1360)
- Coronation book of Charles V of France, sumptuous illustrated manuscript recording the rituals of a royal coronation (1365)
- Sherborne Missal, one of the finest English examples of International Gothic illuminated manuscripts (1385–1415)
- Korean manuscript of volume 32 of the Avatamsaka Sutra, written on gold pigment for a royal patron (1390)
- Illustrated Persian manuscript of three of the five poems from the Khamsa by Khvājū Kirmānī (1396)
- Al-Kashshaf, a commentary on the Qurʻān by al-Zamakhshari (14th century)

== 1400–1500 AD ==
- Manuscript of Sir Gawain and the Green Knight, one of the earliest illustrated English literary works (c. 1400)
- London Manuscript, a medieval Tuscan musical manuscript containing some of the earliest purely instrumental pieces in the Western musical tradition (c. 1400)
- Picture Book of the Life of St John and the Apocalypse, illuminated manuscript featuring the Book of Revelation embedded within the legendary Life of John, rendered in opulent miniatures with inscriptions integrated into the images (c. 1400)
- The Life and Acts of Lalibela, Ethiopian manuscript of the history of King Lalibela of Lasta (1400)
- Lovell Lectionary, illuminated codex painted by John Siferwas, Dominican friar and illuminator of the Sherborne Missal, commissioned by John, Lord Lovell, of Titchmarsh (1400–1408)
- Copy of Histoire ancienne jusqu'à César, historical illuminated manuscript recounting tales of the ancient world, especially the Trojan War, the conquests of Alexander the Great and the greatness of ancient Rome (1400–25)
- Hours of René of Anjou, illuminated manuscript made in Paris acquired by René, Duke of Anjou and King of Naples (1405–1410)
- Great Bible, at over half metre long the largest manuscript of the Bible in the British Library's collection, once owned by Henry IV of England (early 15th century)
- Codex Bellunensis, illustrated florilegia and botanical codex with 180 full-page painted drawings of plants from Belluno, northern Italy (early 15th century)
- One of the earliest copies of the Canterbury Tales by Geoffrey Chaucer, perhaps the most influential literary text in Middle English (1410)
- Book of the Queen, lavishly decorated collection of works by the poet Christine de Pizan presented to Queen Isabeau of France (1410–1414)
- Beaufort/Beauchamp Hours, composite book of hours, the main part of which was most likely made for Margaret Beauchamp (1411–1443)
- Gospel lectionary inscribed in Greek at the Monastery of St Marina in Berat, Albania (1413)
- Old Hall Manuscript, the largest and most complete source of English sacred music of the late 14th and early 15th centuries (1410–1420)
- Wardington Hours, Hours of the Passion illuminated by an artist from the school of the Bedford Master, Paris (1410–1440)
- Breviary of John the Fearless and Margaret of Bavaria, illuminated manuscript given to the couple to celebrate their betrothal (1413–19)
- Bedford Hours, a richly illustrated late-medieval book of hours once owned by the Duke of Bedford (1410–1430)
- Psalter of Humphrey of Gloucester, illuminated Book of Psalms belonging to Humphrey, Duke of Gloucester, uncle to King Henry VI of England (1430–1440)
- Windsor Carol Book, manuscript of music and carols for Holy Week, probably written for St George's Chapel, Windsor Castle (1430–1444)
- The Book of Margery Kempe, the earliest surviving autobiography in the English language (1436)
- Tractatus de Herbis, illustrated treatise of medicinal plants, with nearly 500 representations of plants, animals and minerals, originally from Lombardy, northern Italy (1440)
- Dunois Hours, highly decorated French Book of Hours by the Dunois Master, commissioned by Jean d'Orléans, Count of Dunois (1439–1450)
- Collected commentaries on the Spring and Autumn annals, printed document with early use of Kabin font moveable type under the Korean King Sejong, Seoul (1442)
- Talbot Shrewsbury Book, large richly-illuminated manuscript presented to Margaret of Anjou from Rouen, France (1444–1445)
- Illuminated manuscript copy of Dante's Divine Comedy, produced for Alfonso V, king of Aragon, Naples and Sicily, Siena, Italy (1450)
- Volume of Poems of Charles of Orleans, illuminated folio of poems written by Charles, Duke of Orléans during his imprisonment in England following the Battle of Agincourt (c. 1450)
- Leaf from the Hours of Étienne Chevalier, illuminated book of hours commissioned by Étienne Chevalier, treasurer to King Charles VII of France, the only work of the famed illuminator Jean Fouquet in the collection (1452)
- Two Gutenberg or 42-line Bibles and a leaf from a third, copies of a Latin Bible printed at Mainz, Germany, the earliest major books printed using mass-produced movable metal type in Europe (1450–1455)
- Mainz Psalter, the second work to be produced with movable type in Europe and the first to experiment with multi-coloured printing, one of 10 extant copies, Mainz, Germany (1457)
- Copy of the Bamberg or 36-line Bible, the second moveable-type-printed edition of the Bible from Bamberg, Germany (c. 1458–60)
- Rime and Trionfi by Petrarch, illuminated manuscript of poetry once owned by Cardinal Francesco Gonzaga, northern Italy (1465)
- Mentelin Bible, the first bible to be printed in any vernacular language, one of the first edition copies printed by Johann Mentelin in Strasbourg (1466)
- Shamakhi anthology of poetry, illustrated by Sharaf al-Dīn Ḥusayn, a royal scribe based at the court of the Shirvanshah Farrukh Yassar in Shirvan, Azerbaijan (1468)
- Sanaa Pentateuch or Five Books of Moses, with stylised representations of mountains and fish swimming in the sea outlined in scriptural micrography, Yemen (1469)
- Only surviving manuscript copy of Thomas Malory's Le Morte d'Arthur, retelling the legends of King Arthur and his Knights (1471–1483)
- Recuyell of the Historyes of Troye, copy of William Caxton's first printed book and the first book printed anywhere in English, from Bruges or Ghent, Belgium (1473)
- Constance Gradual, only surviving complete edition of the first printed book of music using moveable type, southern Germany (1473)
- First and second printed editions of William Caxton's Canterbury Tales (1476–1483)
- Manuscript copy of Dictes and Sayings of the Philosophers, Middle English translation by Anthony Woodville of the original book written in Arabic by the medieval Arab scholar al-Mubashshir ibn Fatik (1477)
- Hastings Hours, vellum illuminated manuscript with painted miniatures attributed to the Flemish artist Alexander Bening made for Lord Hastings (1480)
- Lisbon Bible, the most accomplished codex of the Portuguese school of medieval Hebrew illumination (1483)
- Two manuscript copies of the Catholicon Anglicum, an English-to-Latin bilingual dictionary (1483)
- Huth Hours, elaborately illuminated Book of Hours attributed to Simon Marmion, Flanders (1485–1490)
- Early printed editions of the letter written by Christopher Columbus describing his first voyage to the New World, Rome and Basel (1493)
- Isabella Breviary, illuminated manuscript given to Queen Isabella I by ambassador Francisco de Rojas to commemorate the double marriage of her children and the children of Emperor Maximilian of Austria and Duchess Mary of Burgundy (1497)
- Most of the Book of Hours of Louis XII produced by Jean Bourdichon for King Louis XII of France (1498–1499)
- Luxury illustrated copy of the Roman de la Rose, one of the last Flemish Master illuminated manuscripts, Bruges (1490–1500)
- Two copies of the Khamsa of Nizami illustrated by Tīmurid artist Kamāl ud-Dīn Behzād, the most famous of Persian miniature painters (late 15th century)
- Ritson Choirbook, early manuscript source of English carols (late 15th century)
- Hikayat Raja-raja Pasai, the oldest known historical chronicle written in the Malay language (15th century)
- Križanić Breviary, liturgical manuscript written in Glagolitic script by the Croat monk Ivan Križanić, from the Erberg collection, Croatia (15th century)
- Late medieval manuscript copy of the Jónsbók, code of laws promulgated in Iceland by Jón Einarsson in 1280, at the instigation of King Magnus VI of Norway, from the collection of Sir Joseph Banks (15th century)

== 1500–1700 AD ==
- Codex Arundel, one of Leonardo da Vinci's notebooks (1480–1518)
- Sforza Hours one of the most richly illuminated books of hours of the Renaissance (1490–1520)
- Petit Livre d'Amour, manuscript collection of love poems written by Pierre Sala, antiquary and valet de chambre of Louis XII of France (1500)
- The Hours of Joanna I of Castile, illuminated manuscript by Gerard Horenbout from the Ghent-Bruges school (1500)
- Anne Boleyn's Book of Hours, opulent Book of Hours once owned by Anne Boleyn, wife of Henry VIII of England, with lover's inscriptions (1500)
- Nimatnama-i-Nasiruddin-Shahi, medieval Indian cookbook, written in Persian language with Naskh script, commissioned by Sultan Ghiyath Shah of the Malwa Sultanate in central India (1500)
- Stuart de Rothesay Book of Hours, illuminated Book of Hours written by Bartolomeo Sanvito and commissioned by Cardinal Marino Grimani with four miniatures by Giulio Clovio (c. 1508–1538 AD)
- Westminster Tournament Challenge manuscript, illuminated invitation to the Westminster jousting tournament hosted by Henry VIII of England and Catherine of Aragon (1511)
- Portuguese Genealogy, illuminated manuscript made for Infante Dom Fernando of Portugal with paintings by Simon Bening and Antonio de Holanda (1530–1534)
- One of only three extant copies of the first edition of the Tynedale New Testament, the first bible to be translated and mass-produced in English by William Tyndale (1526)
- Diminutive prayer books made for Anne Seymour, Anne Boleyn and Lady Jane Grey; the latter two said to have been taken to the scaffold at their executions (1536–1544)
- Poems of Sir Thomas Wyatt, the earliest notebook in the English language of any major poet that has survived (1530–1540)
- Henry VIII's personal copy of the Great Bible, the first authorised version of the Bible in English (1540)
- Shah Ṭahmāsb's copy of Nizami Ganjavi's Khamsah (Five Poems) with illustrations of The Prophet Muhammad's Celestial Journey by Sultan Mohammed, Tabriz, Iran (1539–1543)
- Psalter of Henry VIII, illuminated psalter by Jean Mallard that belonged to Henry VIII of England (1540–1550)
- Golf Book, illuminated Book of Hours manuscript created by Simon Bening in Bruges, Belgium (1540–1550)
- The Glorification of the Great Goddess, beautiful palm leaf manuscript of the Devimahatmya, copied in Nepal in Newari script during the reign of King Prana Malla of Bhaktapur (1547)
- Triumphs of Emperor Charles V, codex of 12 full page miniature paintings by Giulio Clovio celebrating the victories of the Holy Roman Emperor (1556–1575)
- Yongle Encyclopedia, 24 volumes of the second edition of the encyclopaedia commissioned by the Yongle Emperor, containing the most important texts available at that time, China (1562–1572)
- Mattioli's Dioscorides illustrated by Cibo, a herbal compiled primarily from Pietro Andrea Mattioli’s commented translation of Dioscorides, lavishly illustrated by the Italian painter and herbalist Gherardo Cibo (c. 1565).
- Splendor Solis, medical and alchemical treatises attributed to Salomon Trismosin, meticulously painted and highlighted with gold in Germany (1582)
- Imperial illuminated copy of the Dārāb-nāma in Nastaliq script by Abu Ṭahir Ṭarsusi, originally from the Mughal Library of Emperor Akbar (1585)
- Illustrated memoirs of the Mughal Emperor Bābur and the first volume of Abu'l-Fazl ibn Mubarak's Akbarnamah, both produced for Bābur's grandson Akbar, Lahore, Pakistan (1590)
- Illuminated manuscript of the Khamsa of Nizami, lavishly illustrated manuscript created for the Mughal Emperor Akbar (1590–1600)
- An incomplete manuscript of the Razmnama, an illustrated Mughal translation of the Hindu epic Mahabharata written by Naqib Khan (1598–1599)
- Vologda-Perm Chronicle, chronicle of events in Russian Church Slavonic, important early source for the history of Russia (16th century)
- Book of Soyga, Latin treatise on magic owned by the Elizabethan scholar John Dee (16th century)
- Important music manuscripts for keyboard, including Elizabeth Rogers' Virginal Book, The Mulliner Book, My Ladye Nevells Booke and the Susanne van Soldt Manuscript from Holland (16th–17th centuries)
- The Book of Sir Thomas More, one of a small number of Elizabethan plays to survive in manuscript form with three pages attributed to William Shakespeare (1601–04)
- Rare first edition of Don Quixote, the first modern novel (1604)
- Illuminated manuscript of Anvar-i Suhayli or Lights of Canopus, copied for the Mughal Emperor Jahangir with 36 beautiful miniatures (1604–1614)
- Squirrels in a Plane Tree, Mughal painting by Abu'l Hasan and Mansur, leading court artists during the reign of the Mughal emperor Jahangir (1610)
- Handwritten notebook by Sir Walter Raleigh for his History of the World, drafted while he was incarcerated in the Tower of London (1604–1616)
- Shirburn Ballads, manuscript collection of Elizabethan to early Stuart-era ballads that formerly resided in Shirburn Castle (1609–1616)
- Five copies of William Shakespeare's First Folio of plays (1623)
- One of about 20 extant copies of the Wicked Bible, with one of the most infamous printing errors in history ("Thou shalt commit adultery") (1631)
- Lavishly decorated scroll of Chapter 8 of the Lotus Sutra, presented by Emperor Go-Mizunoo to the Tōshō-gū Shrine in Nikkō. Japan (1636)
- Kaifeng Torah Scroll, sheepskin scroll with 239 columns of text in Hebrew, one of only seven complete scrolls to have survived from the Synagogue in Kaifeng, China (1643–1663)
- Second edition of the Bay Psalm Book, earliest printed book in British North America (1647)
- Most volumes of the Mewar Ramayana, illustrated manuscript with 450 paintings of the Hindu Epic, commissioned by Acarya Jasvant for the library of Jagat Singh I of the Rajput kingdom of Mewar in Rajasthan (1649–1653)
- Ethiopian manuscript of The Four Gospels, richly illustrated manuscript displaying European artistic influences, Gondar, Ethiopia (1664–1665)

== 1700 AD – present ==
- The Revelation of Saint John, profusely illustrated manuscript with 126 paintings, Gondar, Ethiopia (1700–1730)
- One of only two extant copies of Tommy Thumb's Pretty Song Book, the oldest printed edition anthology of English nursery rhymes (1744)
- Rare edition of the Qianlong Emperor's 'Eulogy on Mukden', poem written in thirty-two seal-script forms in both Manchu and Chinese (1748)
- Luxury Sinhalese manuscript containing bilingual Atthakatha, Buddhist scriptures incised in gold on palm leaves, Sri Lanka (1756)
- Statue of William Shakespeare by the French sculptor Louis-François Roubiliac, commissioned by the celebrated Shakespearian actor David Garrick (1757)
- Manuscript draft of the Proclamation of Rebellion, George III's response to the Olive Branch Petition during the American Revolution (1775)
- Copy of the poetical works in the Chaghatai language of Sultan Husayn Bayqara and the Mughal Emperor Babur (1776)
- Only surviving first edition of Gammer Gurton's Garland, early anthology of English nursery rhymes (1784)
- Menggu Ziyun, unique copy of a 14th-century rime dictionary of Chinese written in the 'Phags-pa script (18th century)
- The Acts and Life of Saint Tekle Haymanot, profusely illustrated manuscript with the only known example of a metal cover with carvings of figures and the cross outside of Ethiopia (18th century AD)
- Serat Selarasa, one of the earliest finely-illustrated Javanese manuscripts known, retelling the adventures of Selarasa, prince of Champa and his two brothers, originally owned by Colonel Colin Mackenzie (1804 AD)
- Anthology of poetry by the last Mughal Emperor Bahadur Shah Zafar (early 19th century AD)
- Copy of Taj al-Salatin or The Crown of Kings, one of the finest illuminated Malay manuscripts known, Penang (1824)
- One of only 120 copies of The Birds of America by John James Audubon, containing illustrations of a wide variety of birds from the United States (1827–1838)
- Rani Jindan's Prayer Book, luxurious manuscript written in the Gurmukhi script produced for Maharani Jind Kaur, Regent of the Sikh Empire (1828–1830)
- Manuscript copy in Arabic script of the Meadows of Paradise by Gidado dan Laima, close associate of Usman dan Fodio, founder of the Sokoto Caliphate, northern Nigeria (1840)
- Delhi Book or Reminiscences of Imperial Delhi, album with collection of 120 paintings mostly by the Mughal painter Mazhar Ali Khan, commissioned by Sir Thomas Metcalfe (1844)
- First edition of the Communist Manifesto by Karl Marx and Frederick Engels, one of only 25 copies that survive today (1848)
- Rare first edition of Leaves of Grass, poetry anthology by American poet Walt Whitman (1855)
- Emancipation Proclamation, one of 27 surviving copies of the Leland-Boker "Authorized Edition" printed by Frederick Leypoldt, US (1863)
- Pageant of King Mindon manuscript, the finest example of Burmese manuscript art before it became influenced by Western artistic conventions, depicting the procession of King Mindon and his court to dedicate the Kyauk-daw-gyi Buddha image in Mandalay (1865)
- Imperial manuscript copy of the Tale of Kiều, Vietnamese epic poem written in Sino-Vietnamese script illustrated with scenes from the story, once owned by the French orientalist Paul Pelliot, (1894)
- Kelmscott Chaucer, one of 13 vellum copies of the magnificently decorated book of The Works of Geoffrey Chaucer, inspired by the Arts and Crafts movement and printed by William Morris's Kelmscott Press, with 87 illustrations by Edward Burne-Jones (1896)
- Balfour Declaration, public statement issued by the British government announcing support for the establishment of a "national home for the Jewish people" in Palestine (1917)
- Scarce edition of the Pakistan Declaration pamphlet that kick-started the movement for an independent Muslim homeland in the Indian subcontinent and coined the term 'Pakistan' (1933)
- Rare handbill copy of the Proclamation of Indonesian Independence (1945)
- The original hand-written lyrics of Beatles songs including "The Fool on the Hill", "A Hard Day's Night", "Help!", "In My Life", "I Want To Hold Your Hand", "Michelle", "She Said She Said", "Strawberry Fields Forever", "Ticket to Ride", and "Yesterday" from the Hunter Davies collection (1960s)

== Maps, music, manuscripts and literature ==
- Important maps such as the Anglo-Saxon Map and Psalter world map, two early medieval Mappa mundi from England, one of the earliest maps of Great Britain by the Benedictine monk Matthew Paris, World Map by Ranulf Higden, a Venetian hand-written re-creation of Claudius Ptolemy's Geographia, the Pinelli–Walckenaer and Cornaro Atlases of Portolan charts from Venice, World Map by Henricus Martellus Germanus, the first map showing the Dragon's Tail meaning the Indian Ocean was not landlocked, the first printed map showing the new world, several hand-produced Dieppe maps produced for wealthy Renaissance patrons including one by Pierre Desceliers, the Queen Mary Atlas made by Portuguese map-maker Diogo Homem, one of only two copies of a Map of America by Diego Gutiérrez, part of a Mercator 1569 world map by Gerardus Mercator, a decorative Atlas drawn by the Portuguese cartographer Fernão Vaz Dourado, the Atlas of England and Wales made by Christopher Saxton for Lord Burghley, the earliest extant Chinese Globe made by Nicolò Longobardo and Manuel Dias, the Klencke Atlas, the largest atlas in the world, a rare copy of the Velarde map of the Philippines and a copy of the Mitchell Map of North America (11th–18th centuries)
- Original manuscripts of musical scores including Bach's The Well-Tempered Clavier and Wo soll ich fliehen hin, Balfe's The Bohemian Girl, Bartók's Four Pieces for Orchestra, the sketchbook of Beethoven's 6th Symphony, his Violin Sonata No. 8, Lied aus der Ferne, String Quartet No. 14 and a fair copy of the 9th Symphony, Borodin's Petite Suite, Brahms's Rhapsodie in E♭ (Op. 119, No. 4) for piano and Zigeunerlieder, Britten's A Midsummer Night's Dream, The Young Person's Guide to the Orchestra and War Requiem, Chopin's Barcarolle in F-sharp major for piano, Op. 60 and Polonaises, Op. 40, Debussy's "Brouillards", La chute de la maison Usher and Fantaisie for piano and orchestra, Delius's Brigg Fair, On Hearing the First Cuckoo in Spring and Piano Concerto in C minor, Dvořák's Cello Concerto in A major, Elgar's Enigma Variations, Pomp and Circumstance Marches and Violin Concerto in B minor, Gilbert and Sullivan's The Gondoliers, Patience and Ruddigore, Grieg's Peer Gynt Suite No. 2, George Frideric Handel's Messiah, Music for the Royal Fireworks, Ode for the Birthday of Queen Anne and Zadok the Priest, Haydn's Symphonies No. 40, No. 95, No. 96, No. 97 and No. 103, Holst's The Planets, Liszt's Christus, A folio of Mahler's Symphony No. 9 and "Urlicht" from Des Knaben Wunderhorn, Mendelssohn's Symphony No. 1, A Midsummer Night's Dream and String Quartet in E-flat, Mozart's Adagio and Fugue in C minor, Adagio and Rondo, God is our Refuge, Horn Concerto No. 3, String Quintet No. 6, his last ten string quartets including No. 19, Violin Sonata No. 25 in F major and the thematic catalogue of all his works from 1784 to 1791, Offenbach's Fantasio, Puccini's sketches for Act II of Madame Butterfly, Purcell's My Heart is Inditing, Rachmaninoff's Piano Concerto No. 3, Ravel's Boléro, Rossini's Il pianto delle muse in morte di Lord Byron and part of Ivanhoé, Scarlatti's Griselda, Schubert's "An die Musik", Mass No. 3 and Piano Sonata in G major, Schumann's Piano Sonata No. 3, Richard Strauss's Die schweigsame Frau, Stravinsky's Capriccio for Piano and Orchestra, part of The Firebird and the sketchbook for Pulcinella, Vaughan Williams's 1st Symphony, The Lark Ascending and his Pastoral Symphony, Verdi's Atilla and part of La traviata, Wagner's Die Feen, Der fliegende Holländer, Polonia, and Overture in D, Rule Britannia, Wallace's Love's Triumph, fair copy with the composer's handwritten corrections of Weber's opera Oberon, Webern's Sechs Stücke für grosses Orchester, and many more (18th–20th century works)
- Autograph letters, diaries, notes and other manuscript material from famous people such as Hans Christian Andersen, W H Auden, Charles Baudelaire, Samuel Beckett, Hector Berlioz, Bertolt Brecht, Isambard Kingdom Brunel, Catherine the Great, Charles I of England, Winston Churchill, Captain James Cook, Oliver Cromwell, Charles Darwin, Daniel Defoe, René Descartes, John Dryden, Albrecht Dürer, Dwight D. Eisenhower, Elizabeth I of England, E. M. Forster, Michael Faraday, Benjamin Franklin, Sigmund Freud, Galileo, Mahatma Gandhi, Giuseppe Garibaldi, Edward Gibbon, Johann Wolfgang von Goethe, Adolf Hitler, William Hogarth, Victor Hugo, Henrik Ibsen, Henry James, John Maynard Keynes, Lord Kitchener, Gilbert du Motier, Marquis de Lafayette, D. H. Lawrence, Gottfried Wilhelm Leibniz, Vladimir Lenin, Abraham Lincoln, Carl Linnaeus, David Livingstone, Louis XVI, John Locke, Martin Luther, Marie Antoinette, Karl Marx, Michelangelo, John Milton, Sir Thomas More, Benito Mussolini, Horatio Nelson, George Orwell, Friedrich Nietzsche, Sir Isaac Newton, Napoleon, Florence Nightingale, Laurence Olivier, Louis Pasteur, Alexander Pope, Ezra Pound, Rasputin, Rembrandt, Robert the Bruce, Maximilien de Robespierre, Franklin D. Roosevelt, Jean-Jacques Rousseau, Captain Robert Scott, Mary Shelley, Adam Smith, George Stephenson, Jonathan Swift, Pyotr Ilyich Tchaikovsky, Dylan Thomas, J. R. R. Tolkien, Alan Turing, Jules Verne, Voltaire, George Washington, John Wesley, Walt Whitman, Sir Christopher Wren, and many others (14th–20th centuries)
- Autograph manuscripts of famous novels and poetry from literature including History of England and Persuasion by Jane Austen, The Drowned World, Empire of the Sun and High Rise by J. G. Ballard, the Notebook of William Blake (also known as the Rossetti Manuscript) with many of his most famous poems, Jane Eyre, Shirley and Villette by Charlotte Brontë, Gondal poetry by Emily Brontë, Pan is Dead, The Runaway Slave at Pilgrim's Point and Sonnets from the Portuguese by Elizabeth Barrett Browning, The Ring and the Book by Robert Browning, The Cotter's Saturday Night and A Red, Red Rose by Robert Burns, Childe Harold's Pilgrimage and Don Juan by Lord Byron, Past and Present by Thomas Carlyle, Kubla Khan and The Rime of the Ancient Mariner by Samuel Coleridge, part of The Dead Secret and The New Magdelen (play) by Wilkie Collins, The Adventure of the Missing Three-Quarter, The Adventure of the Retired Colourman, The Narrative of John Smith and the Brigadier Gerard stories by Sir Arthur Conan Doyle, The Rescue, Suspense and part of Romance by Joseph Conrad, A Murky Business by Honoré de Balzac, Nicholas Nickleby and The Pickwick Papers by Charles Dickens, part of Humiliated and Insulted by Fyodor Dostoevsky, The Forty-Five Guardsmen by Alexandre Dumas, Adam Bede, Middlemarch, The Mill on the Floss and Silas Marner by George Eliot, Old Possum's Book of Practical Cats by T. S. Eliot, The Living Daylights and The Fabulous Pay-Off by Ian Fleming, The Forsyte Saga by John Galsworthy, part of The Counterfeiters by André Gide, part of The Wind in the Willows by Kenneth Grahame, The Captain and the Enemy by Graham Greene, Tess of the d'Urbervilles by Thomas Hardy, The Marble Faun by Nathaniel Hawthorne, The Masque of Queens by Ben Jonson, Finnegans Wake and part of A Portrait of the Artist as a Young Man and Ulysses by James Joyce, Ode to a Nightingale and Isabella, or the Pot of Basil by John Keats, Just So Stories, Kim and The Jungle Book by Rudyard Kipling, History of the Seven Families of the Lake Pipplepopple by Edward Lear, Dulce et Decorum est by Wilfred Owen, The Birthday Party and No Man's Land by Harold Pinter, The Deep Blue Sea by Sir Terence Rattigan, Memoirs of a Fox-Hunting Man by Siegfried Sassoon, Kenilworth by Sir Walter Scott, Heartbreak House and Pygmalion by George Bernard Shaw, Hymn to Intellectual Beauty, The Masque of Anarchy, Mont Blanc and Queen Mab by Percy Bysshe Shelley, A Sentimental Journey Through France and Italy and Tristram Shandy by Laurence Sterne, Dracula (theatrical version) by Bram Stoker, La Fille du Policeman by Algernon Charles Swinburne, The Charge of the Light Brigade by Alfred, Lord Tennyson, The Wolves and the Lamb by William Makepeace Thackeray, part of The Kreutzer Sonata by Leo Tolstoy, The Ballad of Reading Gaol, The Importance of Being Earnest, An Ideal Husband and De Profundis by Oscar Wilde, Mrs Dalloway by Virginia Woolf, I Wandered Lonely as a Cloud, My Heart Leaps Up and Upon Westminster Bridge by William Wordsworth, and many others (17th–20th centuries)
- Manuscript of Alice's Adventures Under Ground by Lewis Carroll (given to the British Library by a consortium of American bibliophiles "in recognition of Britain's courage in facing Hitler before America came into the war") (1865)
