= List of illuminated Anglo-Saxon manuscripts =

There are two lists of illuminated Anglo-Saxon manuscripts:

- For manuscripts produced before 900, see List of Hiberno-Saxon illuminated manuscripts
- For manuscripts produced after 900, see List of illuminated later Anglo-Saxon manuscripts
