= List of illuminated later Anglo-Saxon manuscripts =

This is a listing of illuminated manuscripts produced between 900 and 1066 in Anglo-Saxon monasteries, or by Anglo-Saxon scribes or illuminators working in continental scriptoria. This list includes manuscripts in Latin and Anglo-Saxon. For manuscripts produced before 900 see the List of Hiberno-Saxon illuminated manuscripts.

The invasions during the reign of King Alfred the Great created a disruption in the manuscript production in England. When manuscript production resumed in the later portion of Alfred's reign, a break with the previous Insular style of manuscript illumination occurred. The new style, although drawing some elements from Insular manuscripts, also was influenced by Carolingian, Byzantine, and Mediterranean traditions. The Norman Conquest produced another break in English manuscript production which ended the Anglo-Saxon tradition of manuscript illumination. For more information see Anglo-Saxon art.

== Listing ==
This listing includes every surviving manuscript with Anglo-Saxon miniatures, drawings, or other major decoration. It also includes a representative sample of manuscripts with Anglo-Saxon pen-work initials. The manuscripts are sorted by their current location.

- Besançon
  - Bibliothèque Municipale
    - MS 14; Gospel Book, 10th and 11th century
- Boulogne
  - Bibliothèque Municipale
    - MS 10; Gospels, 10th century
    - MS 11; Boulogne Gospels, 10th century
    - MS 82; Amalarius, De ecclesiasticis officiis, 10th century
    - MS 189; Prudentius, Carmina and Miscellanea, 11th century
- Cambridge
  - Corpus Christi College
    - MS 23; Prudentius, Psychomachia and other poems, 10th century
    - MS 41; Bede, Historia ecclesiastica, 11th century
    - MS 57; Miscellany, (Rule of St. Benedict, Martyrology, etc.), 10th century
    - MS 183; Bede, Lives of St. Cuthbert and Genealogies, 10th century
    - MS 198; Anglo-Saxon Homilies, 11th century
    - MS 326; Aldhelm, De virginitate, 10th century
    - MS 389; Vita S. Pauli Eremitae and Felix, Vita S. Guthlaci, 10th century
    - MS 411; Psalter, 10th century
    - MS 421 (pp. 1, 2); Anglo-Saxon Homilies, 11th century
    - MS 422 (pp. 27–586); Red Book of Darley
  - Pembroke College
    - MS 301; Gospel Book, 11th century
    - MS 302; Gospel Book, or Hereford Gospels, c. 1060
  - Trinity College
    - MS B. 10. 4 (215); Trinity Gospels, 11th century
    - MS B. 11. 2 (241); Amalarius, De ecclesiasticus officiis, 10th century
    - MS B. 14. 3 (289); Arator, Historia apostolica, 10th century
    - MS B. 15. 34 (369); Homilies in Anglo-Saxon, 11th century
    - MS B. 16. 3 (379); Rabanus Maurus, De laude crucis, 10th century
    - MS O. 1. 18 (1042); Enchiridion Augustini, 10th century
    - MS O. 2. 31 (1135); Miscellany (Prosper, Cato, etc.), 10th century
    - MS O. 3. 7 (1179); Boethius, De consolatione philosophiae, 10th century
  - University Library
    - MS Ff. I. 23; Psalter, 11th century
- Copenhagen
  - Royal Library
    - G.K.S. 10, 2°; Copenhagen Gospels, 11th century
- Damme, Belgium
  - Musée van Maerlant
    - s.n.; Gospel Lectionary fragment, s.n., 11th century
- Durham
  - Cathedral Library
    - MS A IV 19; Collectar (Durham Ritual), 10th century
    - MS B III 32; Hymnal and Aelfric, Grammar, 11th century
- Florence
  - Biblioteca Mediceo Laurenziana
    - MS Plut. XVII. 20; Gospel Lectionary, 11th century
- Hanover
  - Kestner-Museum
    - WM XXIa 36; Eadui Codex, 11th century
- Leiden
  - Rijksuniversiteit
    - Cod. Scaligeranus 69; Aethici Istrici Cosmographia, 10th century
- London
  - British Library
    - Add MS 24199, part 1; Miscellany (Prudentius, Psychomachia), 10th century
    - Add MS 34890; Grimbald Gospels
    - Add MS 37517; Bosworth Psalter
    - Add MS 40618; Gospel Book, 10th-century additions to 8th-/9th-century manuscript
    - Add MS 47967; Tollemach Orosius, (Anglo-Saxon translation) 10th century
    - Add MS 49598; Benedictional of St. Æthelwold, 10th century
    - Arundel MS 60; Psalter (with Anglo-Saxon interlinear gloss), 11th century
    - Arundel MS 155; Psalter (with interlinear Anglo-Saxon translations), 11th century
    - Cotton Caligula MS A VII (ff. 11–176); Heliand, 10th century
    - Cotton Caligula MS A XIV (ff. 1–92); Hereford Troper, 11th century
    - Cotton Caligula MS A XV; Miscellany
    - Cotton Claudius MS B IV; Old English Illustrated Hexateuch, early 11th century
    - Cotton Cleopatra MS A VI (ff. 2–53); Miscellany (Grammatical treatises, etc.), 10th century
    - Cotton Cleopatra MS C VIII; Prudentius, Psychomachia, 10th century
    - Cotton Galba MS A XVIII; Aethelstan Psalter, 10th century (see also: Oxford, Bodleian Library; MS Rawl. B 484)
    - Cotton Julius MS A VI; Calendar and Hymnal, 11th century
    - MS Cotton Otho B II; Gregory the Great, Pastoral Care; 11th century
    - MS Cotton Tiberius A III; Miscellany, 11th century
    - Cotton Tiberius MS B I; Orosius (King Alfred's translation), 11th century
    - Cotton Tiberius MS B V (Vol. 1); Miscellany, 11th century
    - Cotton Tiberius MS C VI; Psalter, 11th century
    - Cotton Titus MS D XXVI and D. XXVII; Miscellany, 11th century
    - Cotton Vespasian MS A. VIII (ff. 2v–33v); New Minster Charter, 10th century
    - Cotton Vitellius MS A XV; Nowell Codex (Beowulf manuscript), 10th century
    - Cotton Vitellius MS A XIX; Bede, Lives of St. Cuthbert
    - Cotton Vitellius MS C III; Herbal, 11th century
    - Harley MS 76 Bury Gospels
    - Harley MS 110; Miscellany (Prosper, Isidore, etc.), 10th century
    - Harley MS 603; Psalter, 11th century
    - Harley MS 1117 (ff. 2–42v, 45–62v); Bede, Lives of St. Cuthbert, 10th century
    - Harley MS 2506; Cicero, Aratea], 10th century
    - Harley MS 2904; Psalter], 10th Century
    - Harley MS 5431 (ff. 6–126); Miscellany (Regula S. Benedicti, Statua antiqua, etc.), 10th century
    - Loan MS 11, Kederminster Gospels, 11th century
    - Royal MS 1 D IX; Gospel Book, 11th century
    - Royal MS 1 E VI; Gospel Book, 9–11th century
    - Royal MS 1 E VII (f. 1v); Bible, 11th century
    - Royal MS 5 E XI; Aldhelm, De virginitate, 10th century
    - Royal MS 5 F III; Aldhelm, De virginitate, 10th century
    - Royal MS 6 A VI; Aldhelm, De virginitate, 10th century
    - Royal MS 6 A VII; Life of St. Gregory, 11th century
    - Royal MS 6 B VIII (ff. 1–26); Isidore, De fide catholica, 11th century
    - Royal MS 7 D XXIV; Aldhem, De virginitate and Epistola Aldhelmi, 10th century
    - Royal MS 12 C XXIII; Miscellany (Julian, Aldhelm, etc.), 10th century
    - Royal MS 15 A XVI (f. 84); Miscellany, 9–10th century, 11th century drawing
    - Royal MS 15 B XIX; Sedulius, Poems, 10th century
    - Stowe MS 2; Psalter, 11th century
    - Stowe MS 944; New Minster Register (Liber Vitae), 11th century
  - College of Arms
    - Arundel MS 22 (ff. 84–85v); Gospel Lectionary fragment, 10th century
  - Lambeth Palace Library
    - MS 200 (Part II); Aldhelm, De virginitate, 10th century
    - MS 204; Gregory the Great, Dialogues; Ephram, 11th century
- Monte Cassino
  - Archivo della Badia
    - MS BB. 437, 439; Gospel Book, 11th century
- Munich
  - Staatsbibliothek
    - CLM. 29031b; Prudentius, Psychomachia, 10th century
- New York
  - Pierpont Morgan Library
    - M. 33; Gospel Book, 11th century
    - MS 708; Gospel Book, 11th Century
    - MS 709; Gospel Book, 11th Century
    - MS 827; Anhalt-Morgan Gospels, 11th century
    - MS 869; Arenburg Gospels, 10th century
- Orléans
  - Bibliothèque Municipale
    - MS 105; Winchcombe Sacramentary, 10th century
    - MS 175; St. Gregory, Homilies on Eziekiel, 10th century
- Oxford
  - Bodleian Library
    - MS Auct. F. 1. 15 (S.C. 2455); Boethius, De consolatione philosophiae, 10th century
    - MS Auct. F. 4. 32 (S.C. 2176); St. Dunstan's Classbook, 9th–10th century
    - MS Bodley 49 (S.C. 1946); Aldhem, De virginitate, 10th century
    - MS Bodley 155 (S.C. 1974); Gospel Book, 11th century
    - MS Bodley 340, 342 (S.C. 2404–5); Homiliary, 11th century
    - MS Bodley 577 (S.C. 27645); Aldhelm, De virginitate, 11th century
    - MS Bodley 579 (S.C. 2675); Leofric Missal, 10th-century additions to 9th-century manuscript
    - MS Bodley 708 (S.C. 2609); Gregory the Great, Pastoral Care, 11th century
    - MS Bodley 718 (S.C. 2632); Penitential of Egbert, Collectio canonum quadripartita, 11th century
    - MS Douce 296 (S.C. 21870); Psalter, 11th century
    - MS Digby 146; Aldhelm, De virginitate, 10th century
    - MS Hatton 20 (S.C. 4113); Gregory the Great, Pastoral Care, King Alfred's West Saxon version, 9th century
    - MS Junius 11 (S.C. 5123); Caedmon manuscript
    - MS Junius 27 (S.C. 5139); Junius Psalter, 10th century
    - MS Lat. lit. F. 5 (S.C. 29744); St. Margaret Gospels, 11th century
    - MS Rawl. B 484, f. 85; Aethelstan Psalter (see also: British Library, MS Cotton Galba A XVIII)
    - MS Rawl. C. 570; Arator, Historia apostolica, 10th century
    - MS Tanner 3; Gregory the Great, Dialogues, 11th century
    - MS Tanner 10 (S.C. 27694); Bede, Historia ecclesiastica in Old English version, 10th century
  - Oriel College
    - MS 3; Miscellany (Prudentius, Peristephanon, etc.), 10th century
  - St. John's College
    - MS 28; Miscellany and Gregory the Great, Pastoral Care, 10th century
    - MS 194 (f. 1v); Gospel Book, 10th-century drawing in 9th-century manuscript
- Paris
  - Bibliothèque Sainte-Geneviève
    - MS 2410; Miscellany (Iuvencus, Sedulius, etc.), 11th century
  - Bibliothèque Nationale
    - MS lat. 640 A; Boethius, De consolatione philosophiae, 10th century
    - MS lat. 943; Sherborne Pontifical, 10th century
    - MS lat. 987; Benedictional, 10th century
    - MS lat. 6401; Boethius, De consolatione philosophiae, 10th century
    - MS lat. 7585; Isidor, Ethymologia, 10th century
    - MS lat. 8824; Psalter, 11th century. Link to color scan
    - MS lat. 17814; Boethius, De consolatione philosophiae, 10th century
- Rheims
  - Bibliothèque Municipale
    - MS 9; Gospel Book, 11th century
- Rouen
  - Bibliothèque Municipale
    - MS A. 27 (368); Lanalet Pontifical, 11th century
    - MS Y. 6 (274); Sacramentary of Robert of Jumièges, 11th century
    - MS Y. 7 (369); Benedictional of Archbishop Robert, 10th century
- Salisbury
  - Cathedral Library
    - MS 38; Aldhelm, De virginitate, 10th century
    - MS 150; Psalter, 10th century
- Vatican
  - Biblioteca Apostolica
    - MS Reg. lat. 12; Bury Psalter
    - MS Reg. lat. 1671; Virgil, Works, 10th century
- Vercelli
  - Cathedral
    - Codex CVII; Homilies and poems in Anglo-Saxon, 10th century
- Warsaw
  - Biblioteka Narodowa
    - MS I. 3311; Evangeliary and Lectionary, 11th century
- York
  - York Minster, Chapter Library
    - MS Add. 1; York Gospels, 11th century
