= Schuttern Abbey =

Former Benedictine monastery in Germany

Coordinates: 48°22′55″N 7°51′09″E

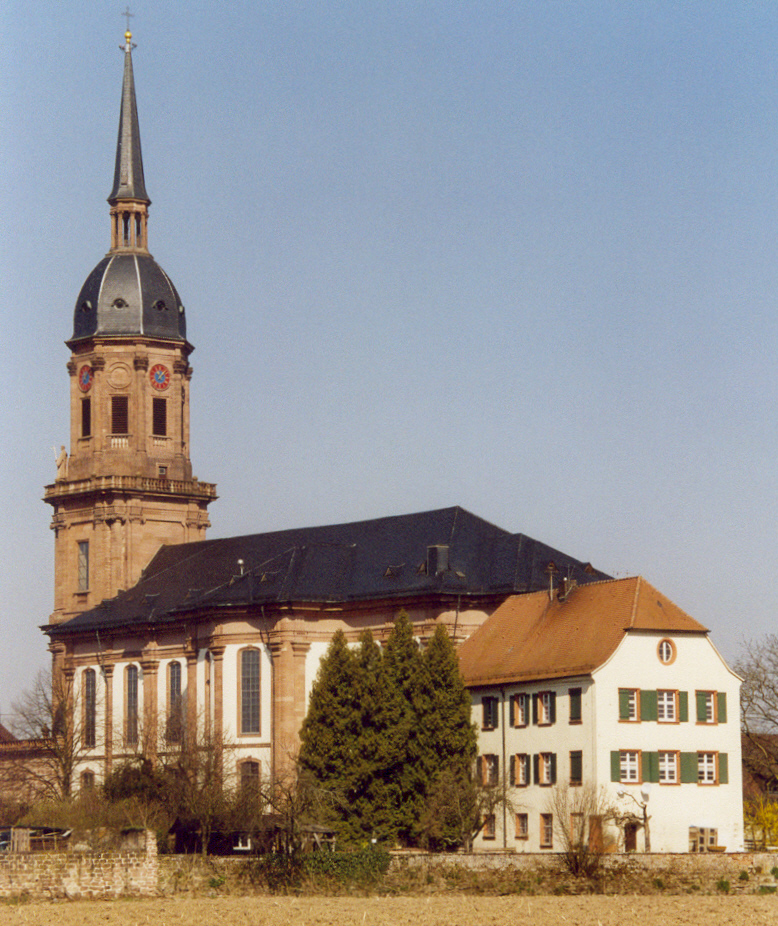
Schutterns Kloster- und Pfarrkirche

Schuttern Abbey (Reichsabtei Schuttern) was a Benedictine monastery in Schuttern (now part of the community of Friesenheim), Baden-Württemberg, Germany.

== History ==
According to tradition, the monastery was founded in 603 by the wandering Irish monk Offo. After some initial difficulties the monastery and the settlement round it, at that time known as Offoniscella ("cell of Offo"), gradually flourished. In the 8th century Saint Pirmin introduced the Rule of St. Benedict and revived the fortunes of the abbey, as demonstrated by the rush of new postulants from the nobility at this period. Schuttern and some others, next only to Bamberg, were reckoned among the most significant Imperial abbeys in the country.

In 817 a Gospel Book (the Schuttern Gospels, now in the British Library in London), commissioned by the then Abbot Bertrich and written by the deacon Luithar witnesses among other works to the existence of a writing school of high quality in the abbey.

In 1016 the Emperor Henry II stopped at the abbey while returning to Frankfurt and visited the tomb of the founder Offo. The grave was covered by a precious mosaic showing Cain murdering Abel, which survives and can be claimed to be the oldest of its kind in Germany. The mosaic, although no longer entire, can now be seen in the church crypt.

Wars, lootings and arson were a frequent occurrence, and the abbey went up in flames on several occasions (938, 1153, 1166, 1169, 1240, 1334, 1520) but was always rebuilt.

On 6 May 1770 the abbey accommodated for a night the Archduchess Maria Antonia, the future Marie Antoinette, daughter of the Empress Maria Theresia, and her numerous retinue, on her way from Schloss Schönbrunn to Kehl, where on 7 May she was to be received by her future court before marrying the future Louis XVI.

Secularisation in 1803 meant the end of the abbey, which was dissolved in 1806. The majority of the buildings were torn down or removed: the stones were used by the local population as a cheap building material.

Between 1972 and 1975 the archaeologist Karl List carried out investigations in the basement of the church. The remains of various predecessor buildings were preserved in a part of the church basement after the excavations were concluded and are open to the public.
