= Silos Beatus =

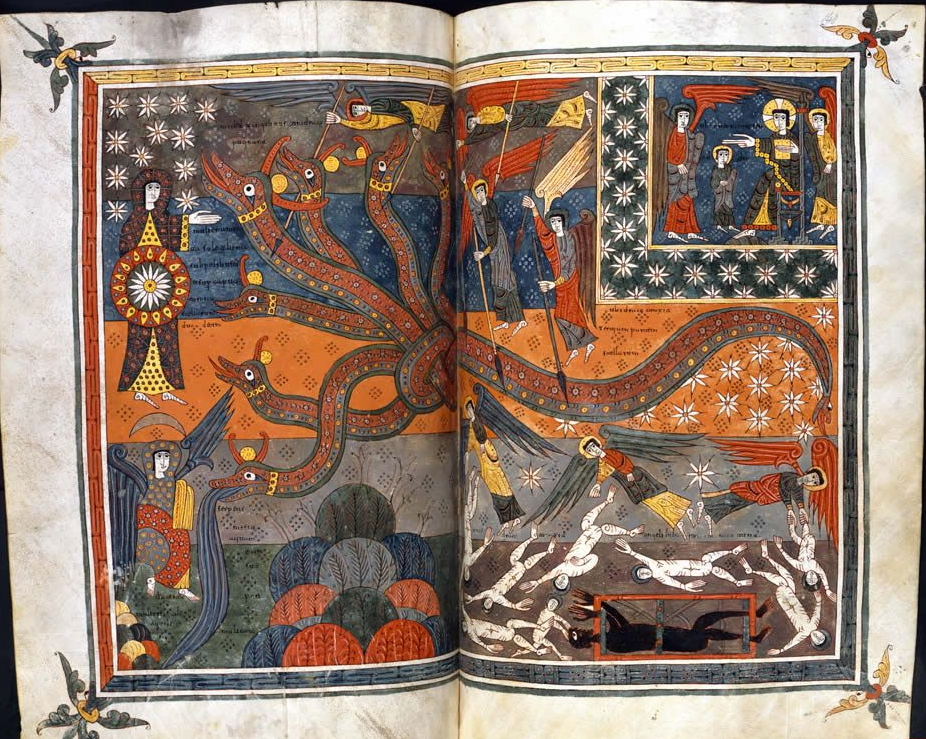
Folios 147v–148r

The Silos Beatus (shelfmark London, British Library, MS Add. 11695) is an illuminated manuscript of Beatus of Liébana's Commentary on the Apocalypse created between 1091 and 1109 in the Abbey of Santo Domingo de Silos.

== Bibliography ==
- Williams, John (2017). Martin, Therese (ed.). Visions of the End in Medieval Spain: Catalogue of Illustrated Beatus Commentaries on the Apocalypse and Study of the Geneva Beatus. Amsterdam University Press.
