= Al-Mubashshir ibn Fatik =

11th-century Arab philosopher and scholar

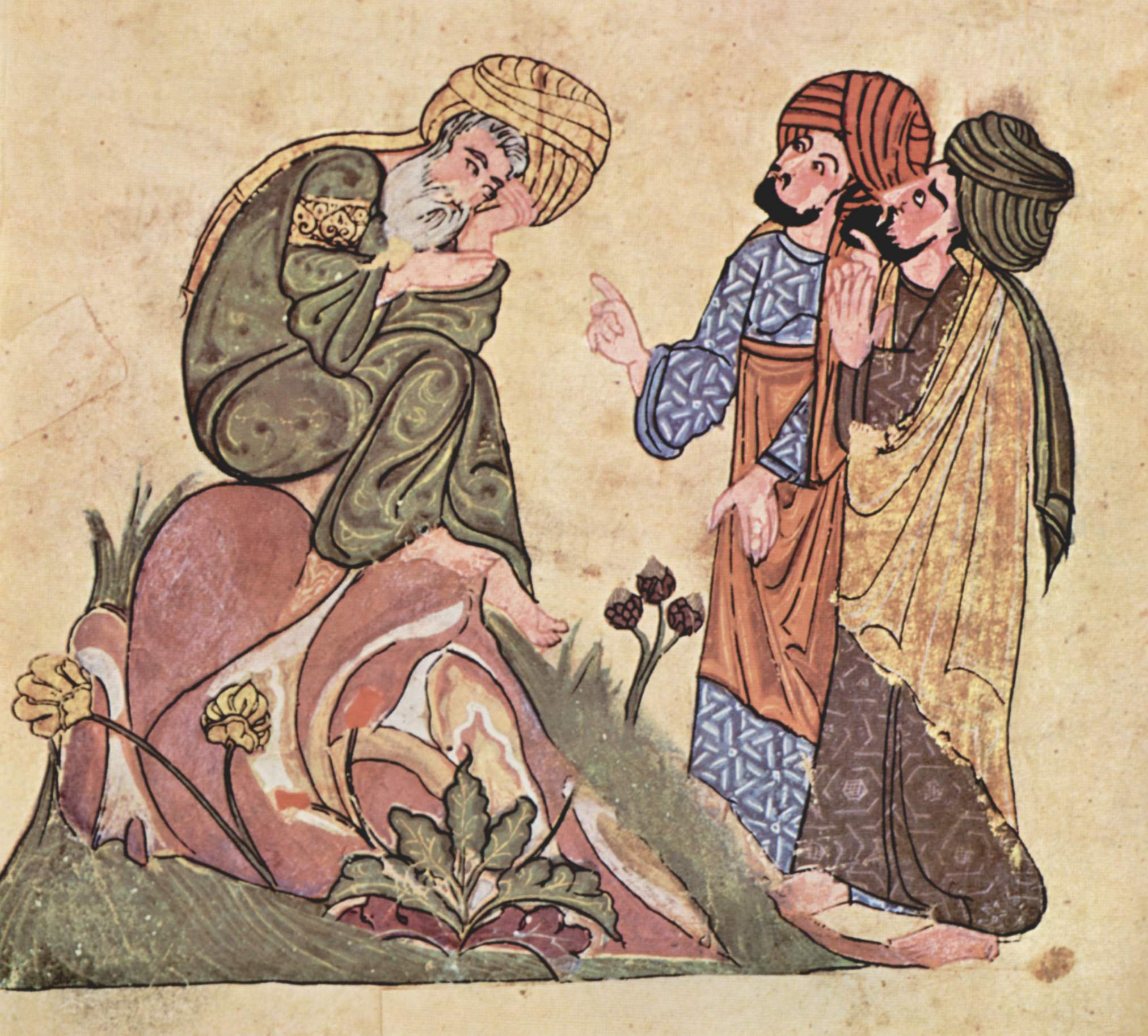
Socrates and two disciples from an illuminated manuscript of Mukhtar al-ḥikam by Al-Mubaššir ibn Fatik

Abu al-Wafa' al-Mubashshir ibn Fatik (Arabic: ابو الوفاء المبشّر بن فاتك Abū al-Wafā’ Al-Mubaššir ibn Fātik) was an Arab philosopher and scholar well versed in the mathematical sciences and also wrote on logic and medicine. He was born in Damascus but lived mainly in Egypt during the 11th century Fatimid Caliphate. He also wrote an historical chronicle of the reign of al-Mustansir Billah. However, the book he is famed for and the only one extant, Kitāb mukhtār al-ḥikam wa-maḥāsin al-kalim (مختار الحكم ومحاسن الكلم), the "Selected Maxims and Aphorisms", is a collection of sayings attributed to the ancient sages (mainly Greeks) translated into Arabic. The date of composition given by the author is 1048–1049.

== Biography ==
The biographical details we have come from Ibn Abi Usaibia's Uyūn ul-Anbāʾ fī Ṭabaqāt ul-Aṭibbāʾ (عيون الأنباء في طبقات الأطباء, "the History of Physicians"). According to Usaibia, Ibn Fatik was from a noble family and held the position of "emir" at the court of the Fatimids in the reign of al-Mustansir Billah. He was a passionate bibliophile, acquired a great collection of books and enjoyed the company of scholars, and above all, he devoted himself to study. He trained in mathematics and astronomy under the philosopher, mathematician and astronomer Ibn al-Haytham (965-1040). He also associated with Ibn al-Amidi and the physician, astrologer, and astronomer Ali ibn Ridwan (988–1061). When he died, many heads of state attended his funeral. According to this biography, such was his wife's disaffection through want of attention, she threw most of his books into the pool at the center of the house, and so they were lost by drowning.

== Works ==
Kitāb mukhtār al-ḥikam wa-maḥāsin al-kalim (مختار الحكم ومحاسن الكلم), the “Book of Selected Maxims and Aphorisms”, can be described as a collection of biographies of twenty-one "sages", mainly Greeks (e.g. Seth, (Zedekiah), Hermes, Homer, Solon, Pythagoras, Hippocrates, Diogenes, Plato, Aristotle, Galen, Alexander the Great), accompanied by the maxims and sayings attributed to them. The biographies are largely legendary and most attributions highly dubious.

== Influences ==
His al-Mukhtar was a great success in the centuries that followed, first in the Arab-Muslim world where it provided source material for later scholars, such as for Muhammad al-Shahrastani in his book Kitab al-wa-l-Milal Nihal and Shams al-Din al-Shahrazuri for his Nuzhat al-Arwah.

== Translations ==
Spanish

- Los Bocados de Oro; translated in the reign of Alfonso X of Castile (1252–1284) was the earliest translation into a Western European vernacular.

Latin

- Liber Philosophorum Moralium Antiquorum by the Italian John of Procida († 1298), friend and doctor of Emperor Frederick II. Several early Latin translations appeared as florilegia and excerpts integrated into larger works.

French

- Les Dits Moraulx des Philosophes by Guillaume de Tignonville, chamberlain to King Charles VI; Middle French from the Latin translation. Of the fifty manuscripts extant the oldest dates from 1402. The first printed editions were made in Bruges by Colard Mansion (no date, perhaps 1477), in Paris by Antoine Vérard in 1486, by Jean Trepperel in 1502, by Galliot du Pré in 1531, etc. (Nine reported editions by 1533).

Occitan

- Los Dichs dels Philosophes from the Tignonville's French translation.

English

- The Dicts or Sayings of the Philosophers (1450) by Stephen Scrope for his stepfather, John Fastolf; Middle English translation.
- The Dictes or Sayengis of the Philosophhres (1473) by Anthony Woodville. William Worcester amended Woodville's translation and it appears this was the version printed by William Caxton in his Westminster workshop on November 18, 1477, the first book printed in England, that is discounting Thomas Aquinas's Apostles' Creed, (Expositio in Symbolum Apostolorum) printed December 17, 1468.

== Editions ==
Arabic

- ʿAbd al-Raḥmān Badawī (ed.), Mukhtār al-ḥikam wa-maḥāsin al-kalim, Publicaciones del Instituto de Estudios Egipcio Islámicos (Egyptian Institute for Islamic Studies), Madrid, 1958.
  Before this edition, only the Lives of Alexander the Great and Aristotle had been published:
  - Bruno Meissner, "Mubachchir's Akhbar al-Iskandar". Zeitschrift der Deutschen Gesellschaft morgenländischen, vol. 49, 1895, pp. 583–627.
  - Julius Lippert, Studien auf dem Gebiete der griechisch-arabischen Übersetzungsliteratur. Heft I, Brunswick, Richard Sattler, 1894, pp. 3–38 ("Quellenforschungen zu den arabischen Aristoteles-biographien").

Old Spanish

- Hermann Knust (ed.), "Este libro es llamado bocados de oro, el qual conpuso el rrey Bonium, rrey de Persia". Mittheilungen aus dem Eskurial, Bibliothek des literarischen Vereins in Stuttgart, CXLIV, Tübingen, 1879, pp. 66–394.
- Mechthild Crombach (ed.), "Bocados de oro: Seritische Ausgabe des altspanischen Textes". Romanistische Versuche und Vorarbeiten, 37. Romanischen Seminar der Universität Bonn, Bonn, 1971.

Latin

- Ezio Franceschini (ed.), "Liber philosophorum moralium antiquorum". Atti del Reale Istituto Veneto di Scienze, Lettere ed Arti, vol. 91, No. 2, 1931–1932, pp. 393–597.

Middle French

- Robert Eder (ed.), "Tignonvillana inedita". Romanische Forschungen, vol. 33. (Ludwig-Maximilians-Universität München), Erlangen, Fr. Junge, 1915, pp. 851–1022.

Middle English

- William Blades, The Dictes and Sayings of the Philosophers. A facsimile reproduction of the first book printed in England by William Caxton in 1477, (translated from the Medieval French by Anthony, Earl Rivers; edited by William Caxton). London: Elliot Stock, 1877. Although three subsequent editions of the book were printed in Caxton's lifetime, of the first of these editions, the only surviving copy carrying Caxton's printer's mark and dated November 18, 1477, is held at the John Rylands Library. Manchester.

== Bibliography ==
- Hermann Knust, "Über den der Grundtext Bocados de oro," Jahrbuch für romanische und englische Literatur, vol. 11, 1870, pp. 387–395.
- Clovis Brunel, "Une traduction provençale des « Dits des philosophes » de Guillaume de Tignonville". Bibliothèque de l'École des chartes, vol. 100, 1939, pp. 309–328.
- Franz Rosenthal, "Al-Mubashshir ibn Fatick: prolegomena to an abortive edition" Oriens 13–14, 1960–1961, pp. 132–158.
