= Dictes and Sayings of the Philosophers =

Compendium by al-Mubashshir ibn Fatik

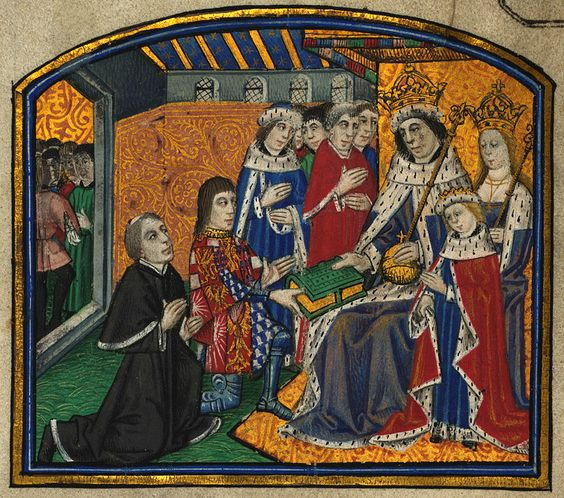
Presentation miniature for Dictes and Sayings of the Philosophers, showing Anthony Woodville presenting the book to Edward IV, who is accompanied by his wife Elizabeth, son Edward and brother Richard. Lambeth Palace, London.

Dicts and Sayings of the Philosophers ("The Sayings of the Philosophers") is an incunabulum, or early printed book. The Middle English work is a translation, by Anthony Woodville, of a wisdom literature compendium written in Arabic by the medieval Arab scholar al-Mubashshir ibn Fatik, titled Mukhtār al-ḥikam wa-maḥāsin al-kalim (مختار الحكم ومحاسن الكلم) which had been translated into several languages. Woodville based his version on an earlier French translation. His translation would come to be printed by William Caxton in 1477 as either the first, or one of the earliest, books printed in the English language.

== History of original and earlier translations ==
The Arabic original is known as Mukhtār al-ḥikam wa-maḥāsin al-kalim ('Compendium of Maxims and Aphorisms'), and was written toward the middle of the eleventh century by a Syrian-born emir of the Fatimid Caliphate of Egypt, Al-Mubashshir ibn Fatik. The earliest European translation was the Spanish Los Bocados de Oro, completed in the reign of Alfonso X of Castile (1252–1284). Wisdom literature became popular throughout medieval Europe and subsequently versions appeared in several languages, including Latin, Occitan, Old Spanish, and Middle French. In 1450 Stephen Scrope produced a Middle English translation, titled Dicts and Sayings of the Philosophers. At least three additional Middle English versions are extant; the Helmingham Hall MS (anonymous), William of Worcester's (reliant on Scrope's), and Anthony Woodville, Earl Rivers's translation (printed by William Caxton).

== Textual history ==
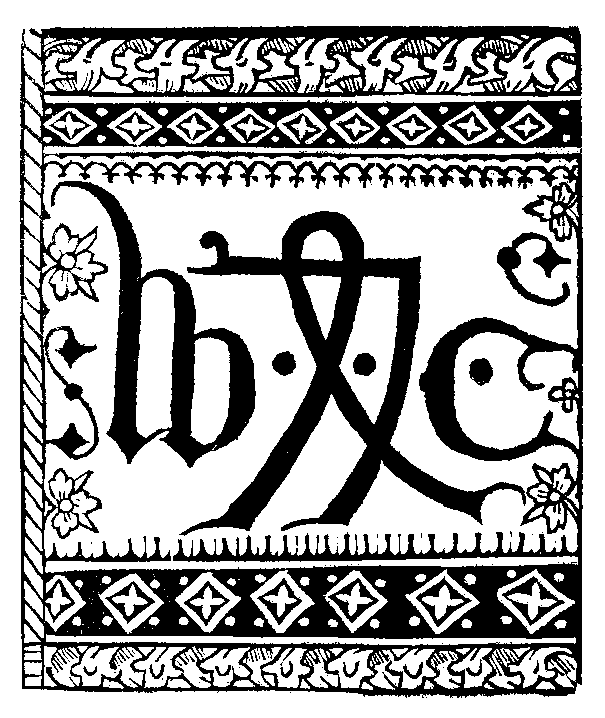
Colophon of William Caxton, 1477

Anthony Woodville, 2nd Earl Rivers's English translation of The Dictes and Sayings of the Philosophers was printed at least three times by William Caxton (1477, ca. 1480, and 1489) and once by Wynkyn de Worde (1528). One of the copies held at Manchester, John Rylands Library holds a colophon with the date 18 November 1477, which makes the Dicts the first book printed in England to bear its date of issue. Two famous manuscript copies include MS Additional 22718 (British Library) and MS 265 (Lambeth Palace Library). Woodville made his translation during his voyage to the shrine of Santiago de Compostela in Spain. In 1473 the knight Lewis de Bretaylle had lent him a French manuscript called Les ditz moraulx des philosophes, by Guillaume de Tignonville. This turn-of-the-fifteenth-century French translation was based on a Latin version.

Caxton reviewed Woodville's completed translation and added an epilogue. In this Caxton points to Woodville's omission of Socrates' remarks on women, which subsequently led to the inclusion of an additional chapter.

== Bibliography ==
- Blake, Norman Francis (1991). William Caxton and English Literary Culture. A&C Black. ISBN 1852850515.
- The Cambridge History of English and American Literature, Volume II.
- "Caxton, William" . Dictionary of National Biography. London: Smith, Elder & Co. 1885–1900.
