= Hours of Saint-Omer =

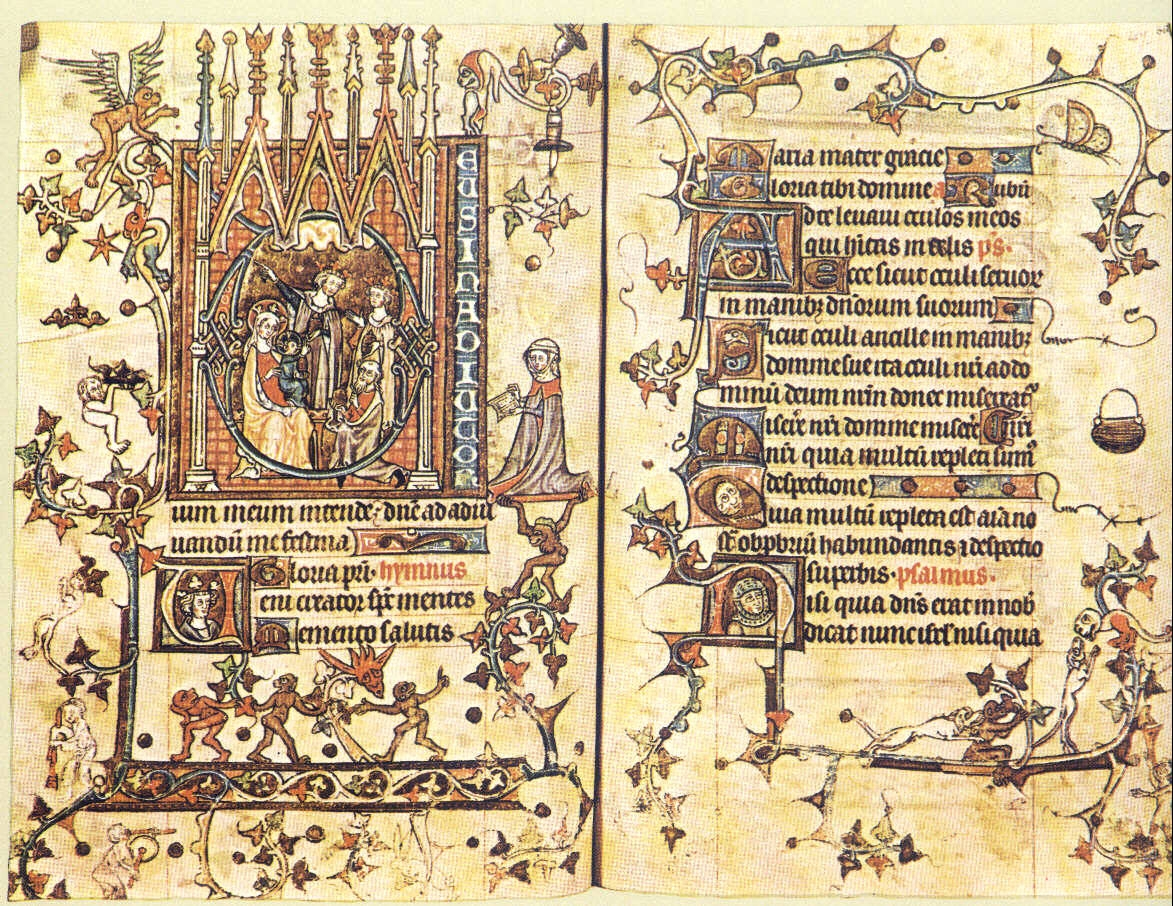
- Adoration of the Magi
- Language: Latin
- Genre: book of hours
- Publication place: France
- Media type: Illuminated manuscript

The Hours of Saint-Omer (London, British Library, Add MS 36684) is an illuminated book of hours produced in Northern France for the use of Marguerite de Beaujeu around 1320-1330. It follows the Arras liturgy. The manuscript gains its name from the fact that its calendar gives special attention to the church and the relics of Saint Omer in the town of Saint-Omer.
