= Schuttern Gospels =

Illuminated Gospel Book

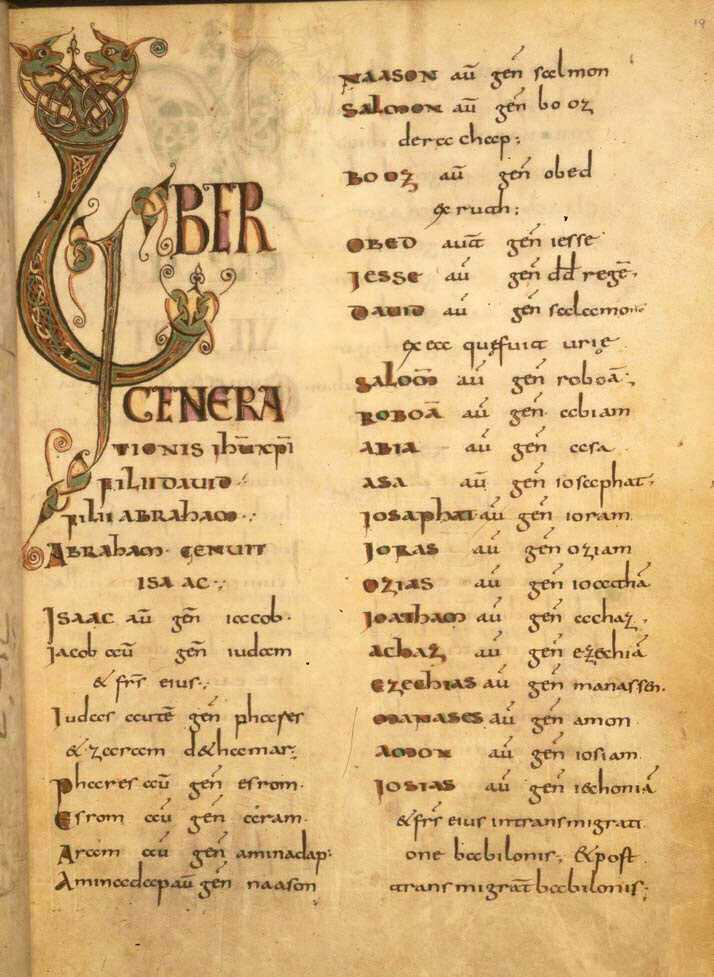
Folio 19r of the Schuttern Gospels has large initials marking the beginning of the Gospel of Matthew. Note the decorated Chi Rho monogram bleeding through from the other side of the page.

The Schuttern Gospels (British Library, Add MS 47673) is an early 9th century illuminated Gospel Book that was produced at Schuttern Abbey in Baden. According to a colophon on folio 206v, the manuscript was written by the deacon Liutharius, at the order of his abbot, Bertricus.

== Codicology ==
The vellum codex has 211 folios that measure 300 by 215 mm. The text is written is a space measuring 232 by 155 mm. The folios are gathered into quires, most of which have eight leaves each; the first and the next to last quires have only six leaves; and the eleventh quire has seven leaves excised. The majority of the folios were ruled using a hard point. They were ruled two bifolios at a time, before the bifolios were folded. The manuscript has a mid-19th century binding of purple leather.

== Text and script ==
The manuscript contains the text of the four Gospels in Latin along with the Eusebian canon tables, prefaces, summaries and capitulary. The text is written in two columns of twenty-five lines each in a Carolingian minuscule that has some Merovingian characteristics. The texts of the canon table, the chapter tables and the colophon are in the same hand.

== Decoration ==
The manuscript has arcaded canon tables and chapter tables. There are large initials which are decorated interlace, and beast and bird motifs, similar to those found in Insular manuscripts. Folio 19v has a large decorated Chi Rho monogram to mark the text of Matthew 1:18. The manuscript does not have miniatures of evangelist portraits or evangelist symbols. In their place, there are purple and indigo rectangular panels with borders on which are quotations from the Book of Psalms written in uncials with white ink. The panel for the Gospel of Matthew has Psalm 67, verses 27 and 29 and Psalm 31 verses 1 and 2. The panel for the Gospel of Mark has Psalm 33 verses 12–15. Luke's panel has Psalm 33, verses 9 and 10. The panel for the Gospel of John is missing.

== Provenance ==
The colophon on folio 202v reads: Ego Liutharius diaconus hunc biblum scripsi ob iussu bertrici abbatis, ad salutem querentibus anime vel legentibus…. The names Liutharius and Abbot Bertricus can be found on a list of monks of Schuttern Abbey from the early 9th century which is preserved at the monastery of Reichenau. The manuscript was still at Schuttern Abbey in the 13th century when a charter dated 1269 for the abbey and the Abbot Hermannus, was recorded on folio 211. It was acquired by Thomas Coke, 1st Earl of Leicester (died 1759) and included in his library at Holkham Hall. Folio ii bears the bookplate of Thomas William Coke, 1st Earl of Leicester of Holkham. The manuscript was acquired by the British Library, along with 11 other manuscripts from Holkham Hall.
