= Egerton Hours =

- London, British Library, MS Egerton 1070
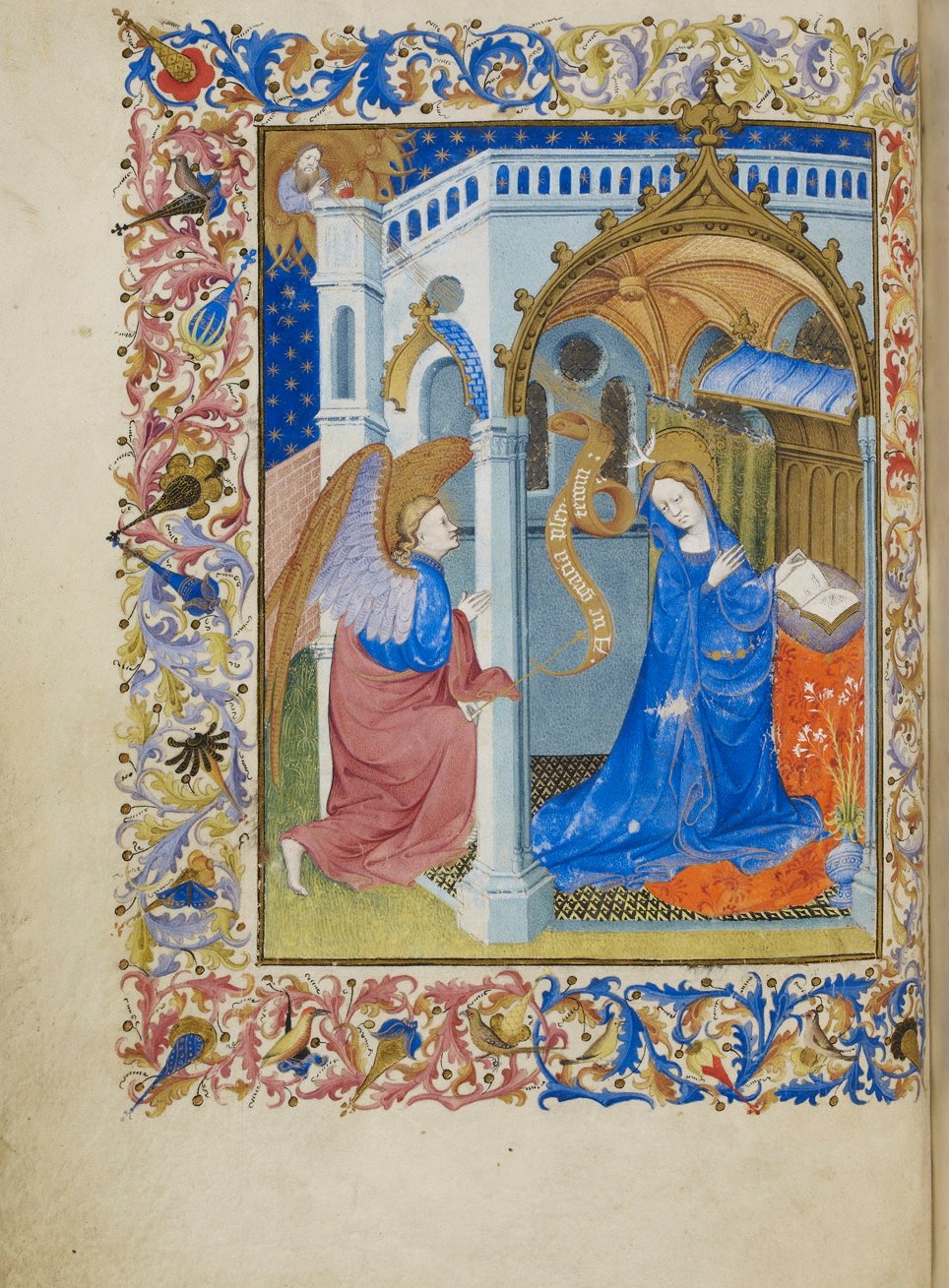
- The Annunciation, f. 15v
- Type: Book of hours
- Date: c. 1407–1410 and c. 1440
- Illuminated by: Egerton Master; Mazarine Master; Master of the Parement of Narbonne; Barthélemy d'Eyck
- Material: Parchment
- Size: 22 x 16.5 cm.; 154 folios

The Egerton Hours is a book of hours of the use of Paris, illuminated in France during the 15th century. The manuscript belonged to the Valois-Anjou family and probably to René of Anjou. It is currently held in the British Library as MS Egerton 1070.

== History ==
The manuscript was probably written in 1407. According to Eberhard König, the manuscript may have been commissioned by Louis I, Duke of Orléans, his symbol, knotty sticks, being found in some of the decorations of the margins. He died, however, in 1407 and the manuscript soon came into the possession of a member of the Anjou family. He had the illumination of the manuscript completed around 1410. His possession of the manuscript appears to be reflected in elements of the miniatures: the image of Charlemagne takes on the features of Charles of Blois, father of Mary of Blois, the wife of Louis I of Anjou. The Book of Hours came into the possession of René d'Anjou. For a long time, it was thought that he had the manuscript during his captivity in Dijon from 1431 to 1437. A prayer entitled Libera Renatum ("Free the reborn") has indeed been added to the book. However, the additions due to King René date from the period after his return from Italy in 1442, and the book he had in his possession at that time was rather the book of hours now in the Bibliothèque nationale de France (MS Latin 1156A). Other texts were added in the 1440s, as well as five full-page miniatures.

Subsequently, the manuscript found itself in the hands of George Strangways, archdeacon of Coventry, who donated it to Henry VII of England (1457–1509); there is a dedication mentioning this on folio 154. The book was then given to the Jesuits of Kraków. In the 19th century, it was in the possession of the Grand Duchess of Mecklenburg-Schwerin who began attempts to sell it in London in 1832. It was acquired by the British Museum on 6 July 1844 from a certain H. Ruschweigh. The museum used the Bridgewater fund for this acquisition, established thanks to the donation of £12,000 by Francis Egerton, Earl of Bridgewater. It was he who gave the manuscript its name, without ever having been its owner.

== Attribution of the miniatures ==
Most of the miniatures from the years 1407-1410 are attributed to an anonymous master who owes his conventional name to this manuscript: the Egerton Master. He undoubtedly originated in Flanders and was active in Paris at the beginning of the 15th century. He collaborated as here with another anonymous person, the Mazarine Master. In this manuscript he executes most of the small miniatures of the suffrages of the saints. Some of these same miniatures are sometimes attributed to the Master of the Parement of Narbonne or to his followers, but for Eberhard König only that of folio 97 is by his hand.

The five miniatures added at the time of René d'Anjou are attributed by the majority of art historians to Barthélemy d'Eyck, his favourite painter. This opinion is however contested by Katherine Reynolds and Albert Châtelet.

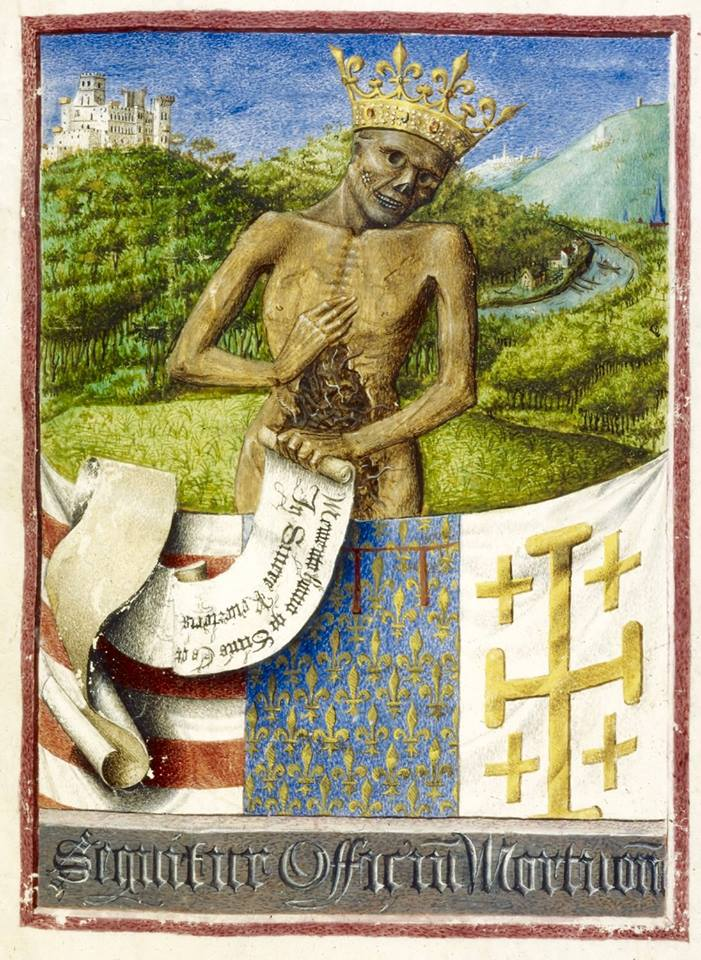
Memento mori, f. 53

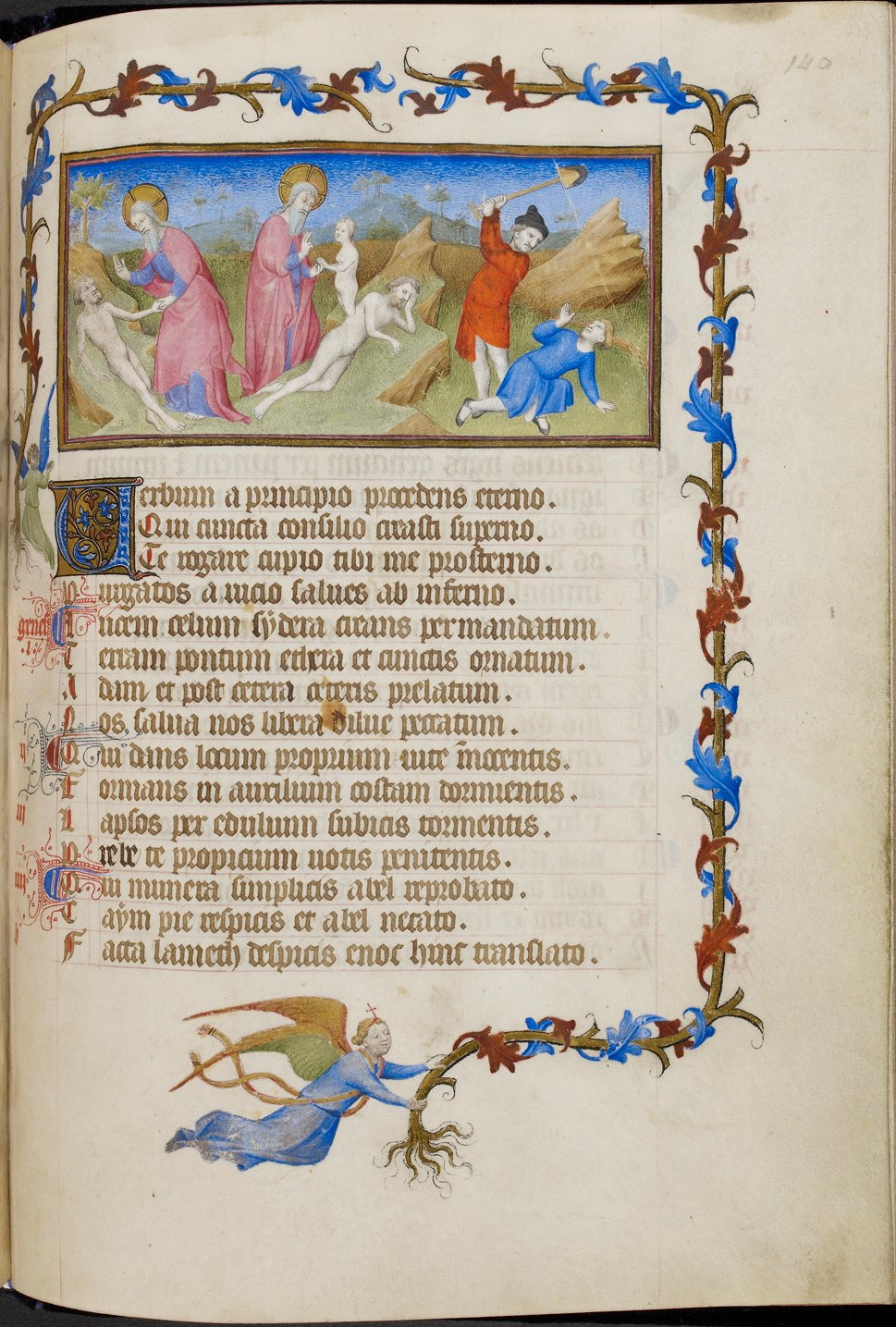
Scenes from Genesis, f. 140

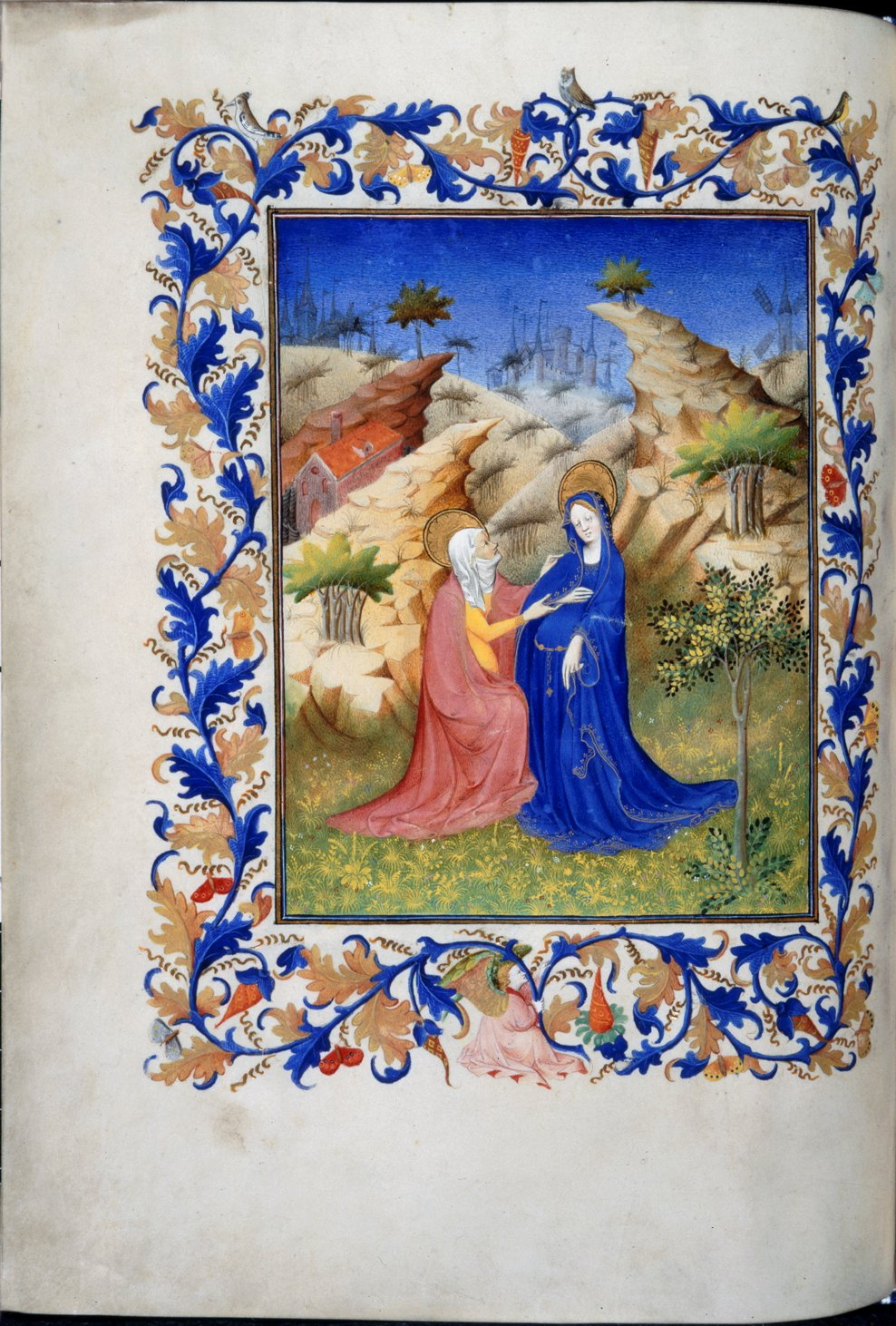
The Visitation, f. 29

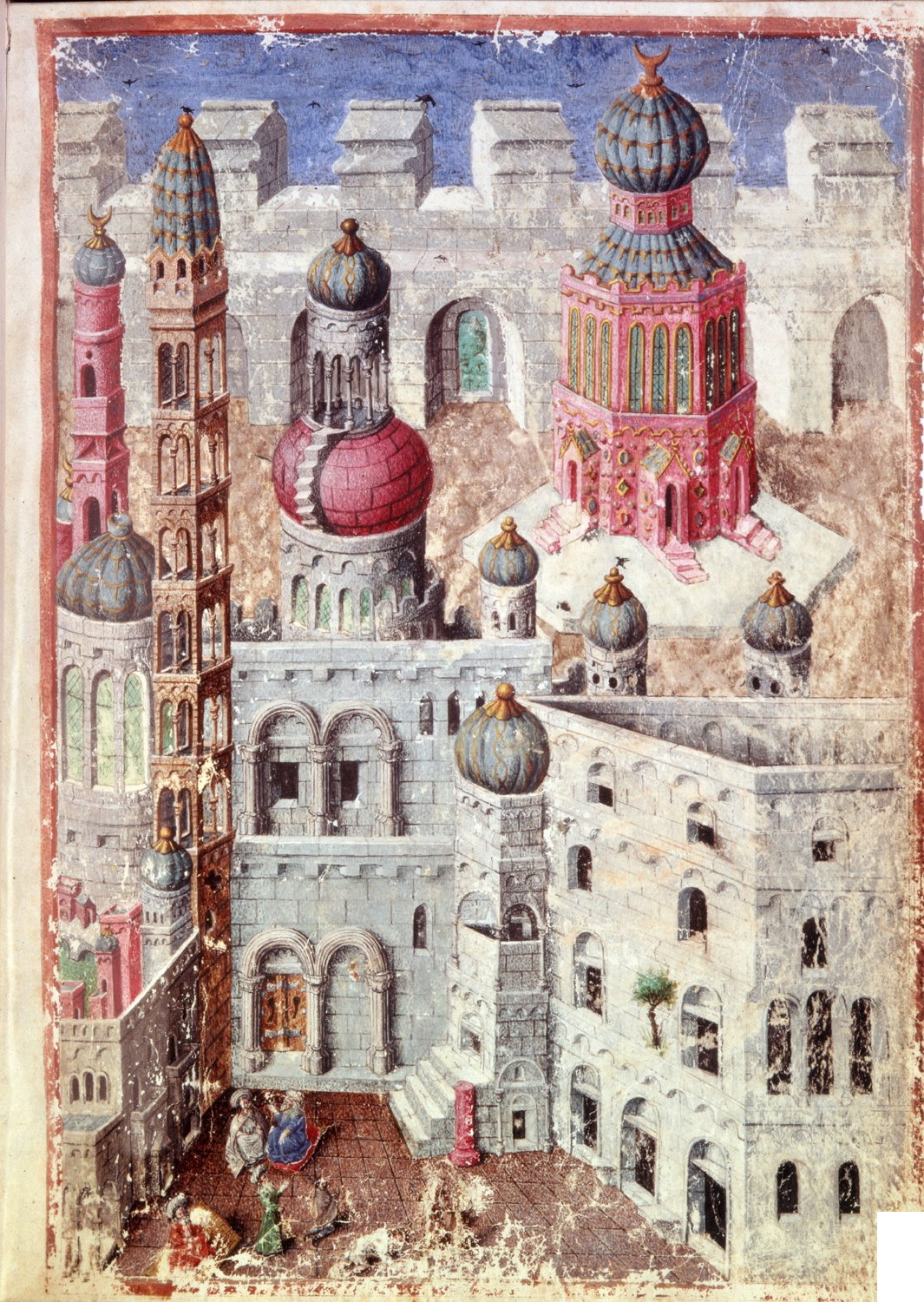
View of Jerusalem, f. 5
