= Prudentius, Carmina and Miscellanea (Boulogne, Bibliothèque Municipale, MS 189) =

Manuscript of some of the works of Prudentius

This manuscript is a copy and translation of some of the works of Prudentius. It was written in 1077 AD in the Christ Church in Canterbury, England by four unknown authors. It is partly written in Latin and partly in late West Saxon, a dialect of Old English commonly used in manuscripts of the time. Some words suggest the onset of Middle English spelling practices. The manuscript is valuable for etymologists because many of the words are scantily attested in Old English, with at least 130 words appearing for the first time in written form, for instance docga "dog".
