= Carolingian Gospel Book (British Library, Add MS 11848) =

Latin Gospel Book

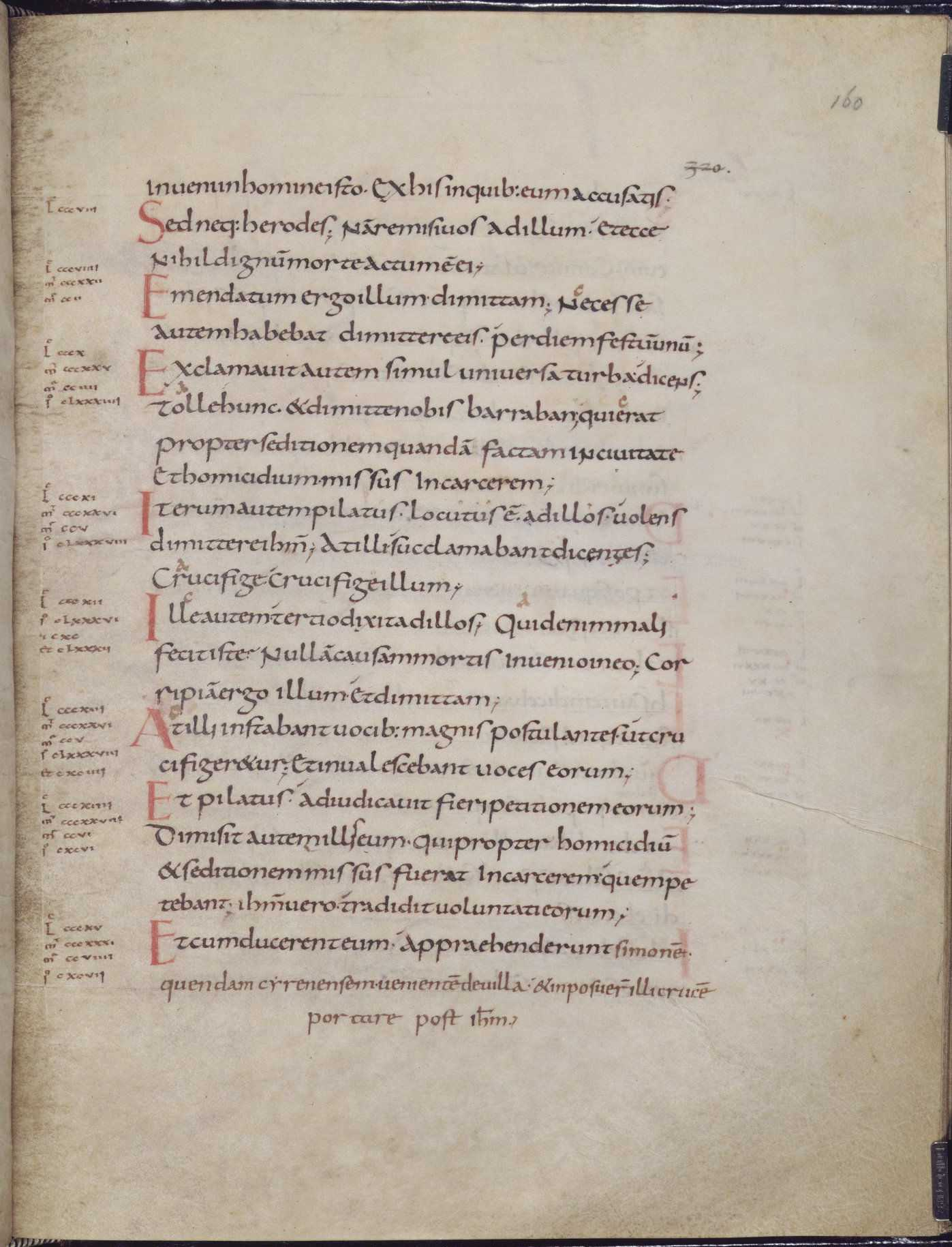
This Carolingian Gospel Book is written in a fine Carolingian minuscule.

British Library, Add MS 11848 is an illuminated Carolingian Latin Gospel Book produced at Tours. It contains the Vulgate translation of the four Gospels written on vellum in Carolingian minuscule with Square and Rustic Capitals and Uncials as display scripts. The manuscript has 219 extant folios which measure approximately 330 by 230 mm. The text is written in area of about 205 by 127 mm. In addition to the text of the Gospels, the manuscript contains the letter of St. Jerome to Pope Damasus I and of Eusebius of Caesarea to Carpian, along with the Eusebian canon tables. There are prologues and capitula lists before each Gospel. A table of readings for the year was added, probably between 1675 and 1749, to the end of the volume. This is followed by a list of capitula incipits and a word grid which were added in the Carolingian period.

== Provenance ==
The codex was produced at the Monastery of St. Martin at Tours between 820 and 830, under the abbacy of Fridugisus, who was the successor of Alcuin. It is the earliest known Gospel Book from Tours to contain four evangelist portraits. The location of the book is uncertain until the 18th century. There is a book stamp on folio 1 that indicates that the volume belonged to Count Suchtelan, the Russian Ambassador to Stockholm in the 18th century. In the early 19th century it belonged to Lord Strangford. It was sold at Sotheby's in August 1831 and was purchased by Samuel Butler, Bishop of Lichfield. The British Museum acquired the book along with the rest of Bishop Butler's collection of manuscripts in 1843, passing later to the British Library.

== Decorations ==
Folio 109 verso contains a portrait of the Evangelist Luke.

The manuscript contains canon tables set within architectural arcades which are decorated with zoomorphic and foliate designs. There are four Evangelist portraits. Each evangelist is shown as a scribe and is identified by a half-length symbol above him and by an inscription. The portraits show some similarities to some Insular manuscripts and some Court School manuscripts, as might be expected given the nationality Fridugisus, who was English, and from his connections to the Carolingian court. The portraits have been described as being "coarsely executed". The manuscript also contains a decorated title page and incipit page for each gospel. There are also decorated major and minor initials. The major initials are done in early Franco-Saxon style and were done by a different artist than the one who did the portraits.

== Binding ==
The volume still has its Carolingian treasure binding dating from the ninth century. The covers were refurbished in the 14th and 19th centuries. The covers are oak panels covered in embossed silver. The front cover has the figure of a seated Christ in Majesty enclosed within a rectangular frame decorated with stones and foliate designs. The majority of the medal work is 9th century typical of mid-ninth century Carolingian metalwork. In the four corners of the frame are enamels of the four evangelist symbols, which were added in the fourteenth century. The enamels were probably produced at Limoges. The original colored stones were replaced by jewels in 1838 for Bishop Butler. There are relics of finger bones from an anonymous saint embedded on the interior of the boards. The clasps for the volume were probably replaced in the 19th century.
