= Georgius Zothorus Zaparus Fendulus =

12th-century astrological writer

Georgius Zothorus Zaparus Fendulus was an author/compiler active during the second half of the 12th century, known for his Liber astrologiae (Liber Albumazarus). His exact identity is not known – the name itself is probably a pseudonym (cognomen) – but it has been proposed that he was a cleric associated with the court of the kings of Sicily.

== Details ==
Fendulus, who in the prologue of his book calls himself "priest of G., philosopher and courtier", had put together the Liber astrologiae from substantial extracts of Hermann of Carinthia's Latin translation of Abū Maʿshar's Great Introduction to Astrology. The prototype of the book has now disappeared, but the text has been copied into several richly illustrated manuscripts, of which the two oldest surviving examples are the ones in Bibliothèque nationale de France, Latin 7330 (dated to c.1220–1240) and British Library, Sloane MS 3983 (mid-fourteenth century). The later medieval French copies reflect the success of Fendulus’ text and the broad dissemination of its imagery.

The Liber astrologiae manuscripts are notable for their series of luxury full-page illustrations depicting the twelve signs of the zodiac and constellations that are said to rise alongside those signs. The constellations are organised in segments of 10° of the night sky (so-called "decans"), three per each zodiac sign, and following in parallel three traditions of cataloguing stars: "according to the Persians", "Indians", and "Greeks". The Fendulus manuscripts also include a set of figures representing the seven planet-gods, each depicted four times, illustrating how the combination of each planet with a particular zodiac sign affects that planet's power (domicile, detriment, exaltation and fall).

== Bibliography ==
- Lawrence-Mathers, Anne (2025). A Gift for a King: The Visionary Astrology of Georgius Zotorus Zaparus Fendulus in The Magic Books: A History of Enchantment in 20 Medieval Manuscripts. New Haven: Yale University Press.
- Pérez-Jiménez, Aurelio; Lippincott, Kristen; Burnett, Charles; Hübner, Wolfgang; and Kidd, Peter (2023). Liber astrologiae (Abū Maʿshar Treatise). Barcelona: M. Moleiro Editor.
- Gousset, Marie-Thérèse, and Verdet, Jean-Pierre (1989). Georgius Zothorus Zaparus Fendulus: Liber astrologiae. Paris: Bibliothèque Nationale.
- Clark, Vicky Armstrong (1979). The Illustrated Abridged Astrological Treatises of Albumasar: Medieval Astrological Imagery in the West. PhD dissertation. The University of Michigan.
- Saxl, Fritz and Meier, Hans (1953). Catalogue of Astrological and Mythological Illuminated Manuscripts of the Latin Middle Ages. Volume III, 1–2: Manuscripts in English Libraries. London: Warburg Institute.
