= Liber astrologiae (Liber Albumazarus) =

14th-century illuminated astrological manuscript (Sloane 3983)

- The British Library, Sloane MS 3983
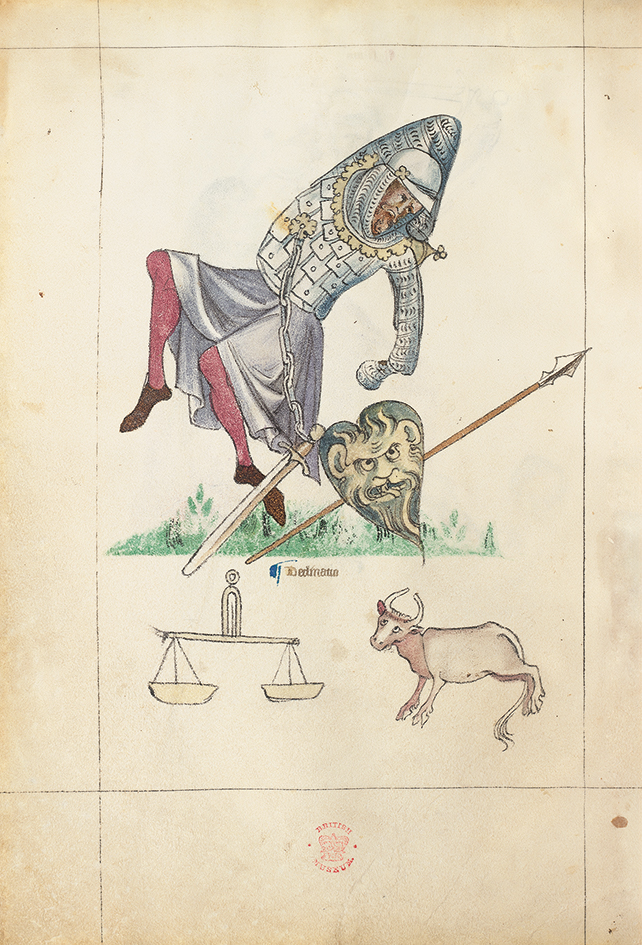
- Also known as: Abū Maʿshar Treatise
- Type: astrological
- Date: mid-14th century
- Place of origin: Franco-Flemish region (Flanders, north of France or Burgundian Netherlands)
- Language: Latin
- Author(s): Abu Ma'shar al-Balkhi, Herman of Carinthia
- Compiled by: Georgius Zothorus Zaparus Fendulus
- Material: parchment
- Size: 270 × 186 mm; 49 folios
- Illumination: 72 full-page illustrations in pen-and-wash

Liber astrologiae, or Liber Albumazarus (as titled in the two incipits of the British Library, Sloane MS 3983), also known as the Abū Maʿshar Treatise, is a richly illustrated Latin compilation of astrological writings by Georgius Zothorus Zaparus Fendulus. Its ultimate source is the Persian astrologer Abū Maʿshar's Great Introduction to Astrology (9th century), transmitted through Hermann of Carinthia's Latin translation, Introductorium in astronomiam (1140), from which the text is largely derived. The British Library manuscript was copied and illuminated in the 14th century, possibly in Flanders (perhaps Bruges), northern France or Burgundian Netherlands, and it is the second-oldest surviving witness to the work attributed to Fendulus, after Paris, Bibliothèque nationale de France, Latin 7330. It also served as the model for another illuminated copy of the text, now in the Morgan Library & Museum, MS M.785.

== Contents ==
The manuscript opens with Fendulus’ prologue, followed by a brief introduction to astronomical and astrological principles compiled from Hermann of Carinthia’s Introductorium in astronomiam. The subsequent sections likewise draw extensively on the same source and include twelve chapters on the zodiac and a catalogue of the paranatellonta (the constellations rising simultaneously with each zodiacal sign) together with a section on the planets. The volume concludes with a later addition: the horoscopic diagram of the birth of Christ.

The section on the zodiac and the paranatellonta outlines the characteristics of the twelve zodiac signs and presents three lists of non-zodiac constellations, reflecting distinct star-cataloguing traditions “according to the Persians”, “according to the Indians”, and “according to the Greeks”. They are divided into three equal parts, or decans, for each sign. The planetary section describes the sphere of influence and the lots associated with each planet, while their domiciles, detriments, exaltations, and falls are illustrated in the manuscript’s illuminations.

== Decoration ==
The manuscript features 72 full-page illustrations in a line-drawn and colour-wash technique, all rendered in an elegant Burgundian style. In the zodiac section, each page of text is followed by a page depicting the corresponding zodiac sign, followed by three additional pages – one for each decan – divided into three registers. The registers show the constellations (or portions of constellations) that rise with the sign, accompanied by identifying labels. In the planetary section, the seven classical planetary deities – Saturn, Jupiter, Mars, the Sun (Sol), Venus, Mercury, and the Moon (Luna) – are each shown four times, either enthroned or falling, together with their associated zodiac signs and a label describing their astrological relationship.

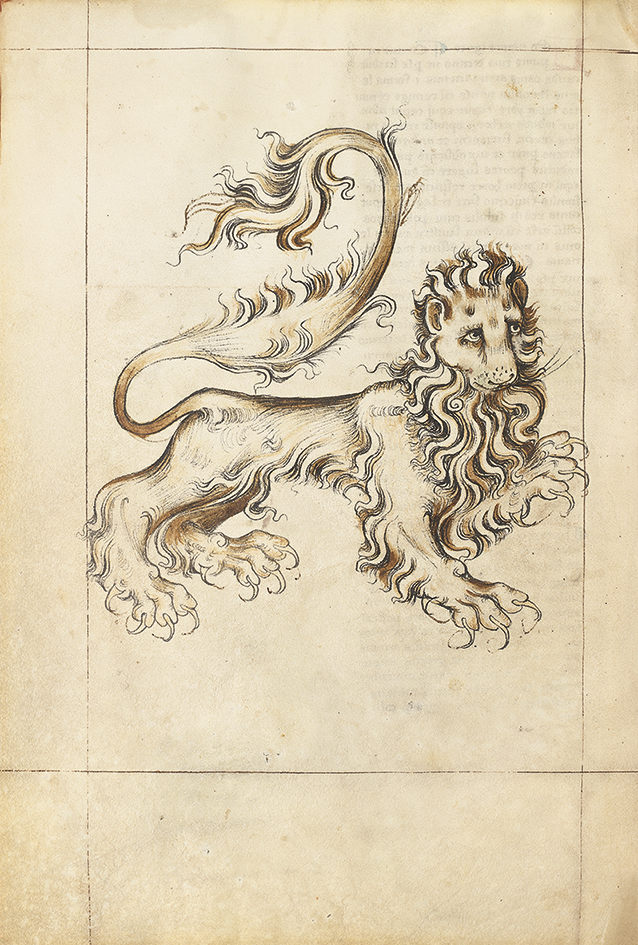
Leo, f. 16v

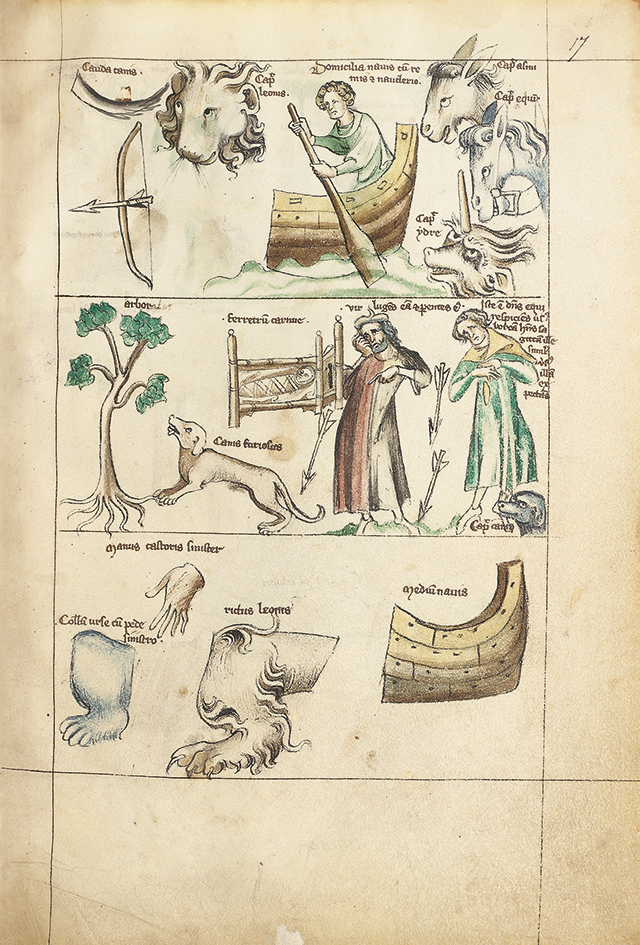
Leo, first decan, f. 17r

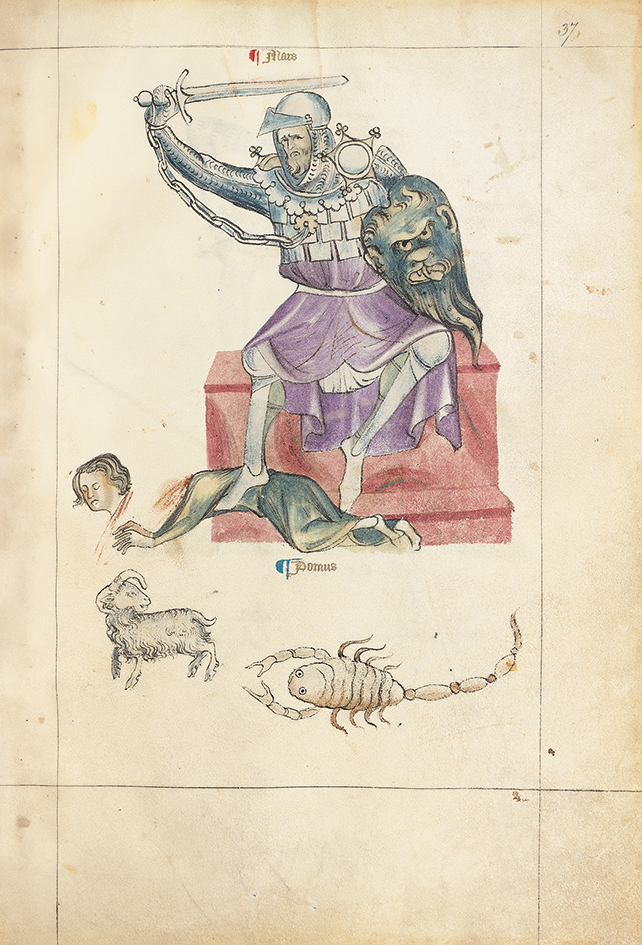
Mars: House (Aries and Scorpio), f. 37r

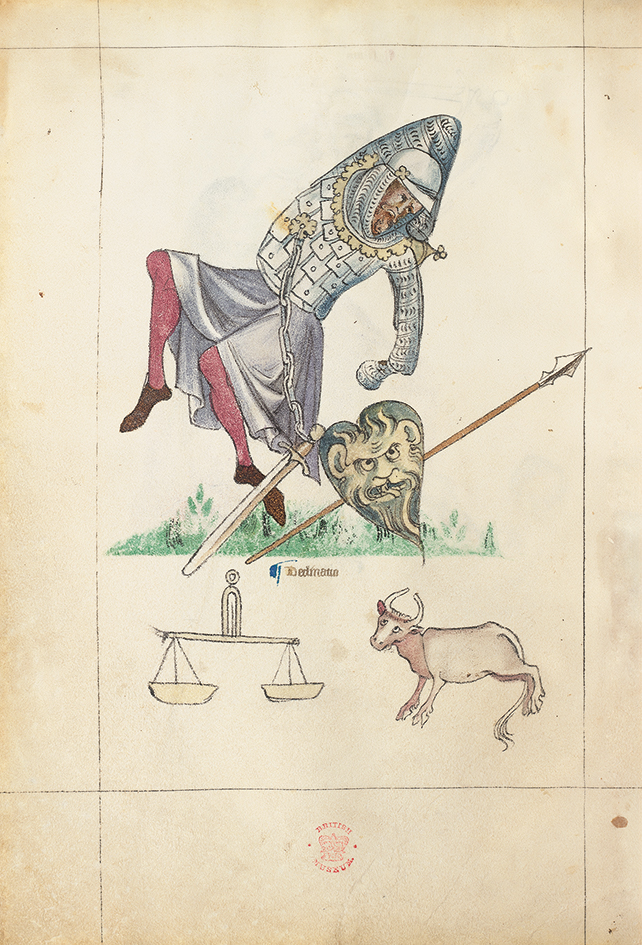
Mars: Detriment (Libra and Taurus), f. 37v
