= Gospel Book (British Library, Add MS 40618) =

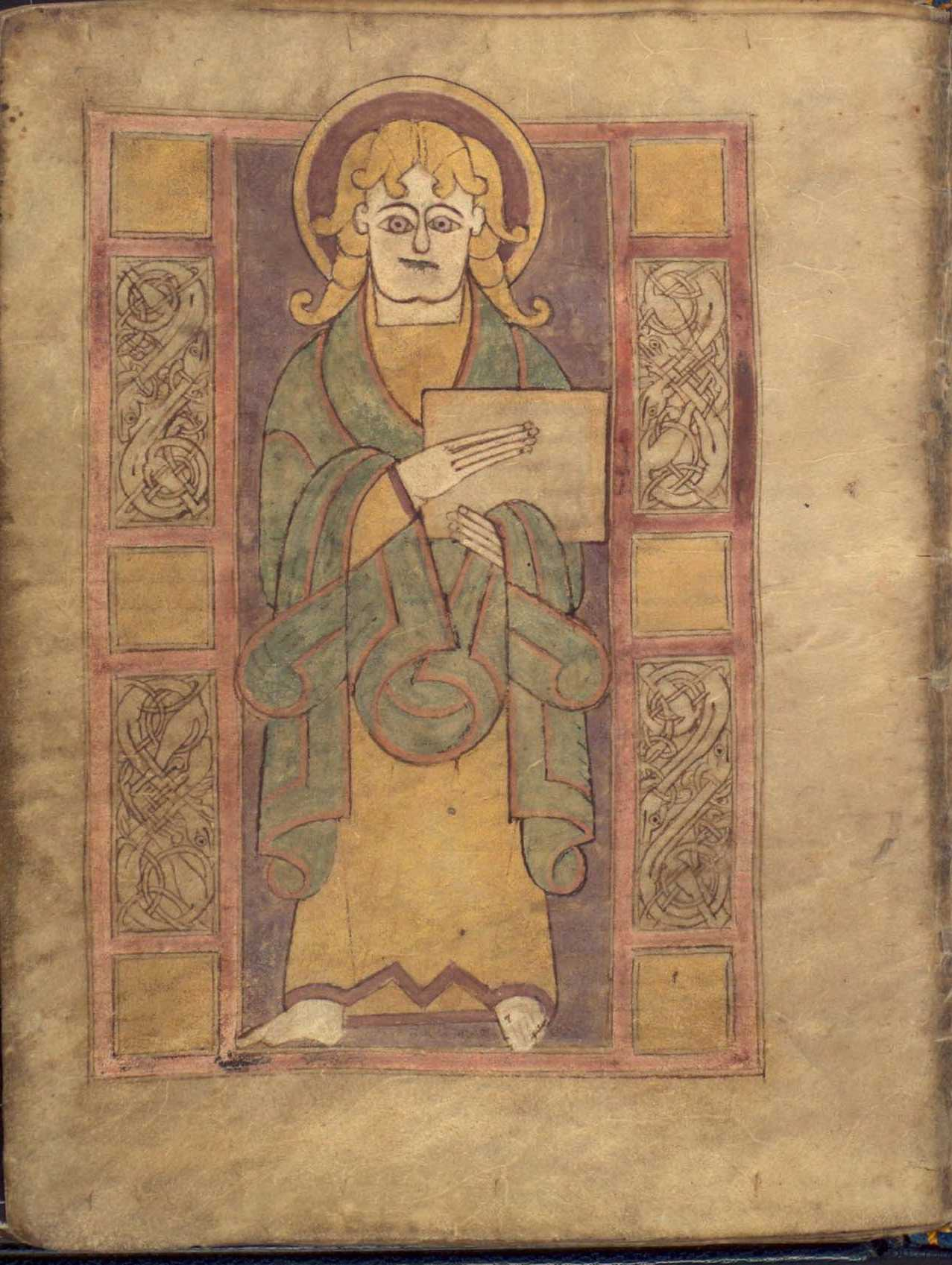
Folio 21v contains the 8th century portrait of Luke.

Folio 22v contains the 10th century portrait of Luke.

British Library, Add MS 40618 is a late 8th-century illuminated Irish Gospel Book with 10th-century Anglo-Saxon additions. The manuscript contains a portion of the Gospel of Matthew, the majority of the Gospel of Mark and the entirety of the Gospels of Luke and John. There are three surviving Evangelist portraits, one original and two 10th-century replacements, along with 10th-century decorated initials. It is catalogued as number 40618 in the Additional manuscripts collection at the British Library.

The manuscript has 66 surviving vellum folios. The pages are 130 by 105 mm. The text occupies an area of 101 by 73 mm. There are gatherings of 16 or 20 folios. The oak board used as the back cover survives along with a vellum cover from another book that was used as a wrapper starting in the 17th century.

The manuscript is missing several folios. The first 18 folios are missing from Matthew so the text begins at Matthew 21:32. There are two folios missing that contained the end of Matthew and the beginning of Mark. The remainder of Mark and the other two Gospels are complete. The original final page of John has been lost but was replaced by a folio written in by a 10th-century Anglo-Saxon scribe. The original Evangelist portraits of Matthew, Mark and John have also been lost. In the 10th century Evangelist portraits were added to either replace or to supplement the originals. Of these the portraits of Luke and John survive.

The manuscript is a pocket gospel. The text belongs to the Irish Vulgate tradition with a few Old Latin readings. The manuscript is written in a pointed Insular minuscule in three hands, although the second hand wrote only a few lines on folio 51. Edward the Deacon, the scribe who wrote the Anglo-Saxon page at the end of John, wrote in an Anglo-Saxon minuscule that had some features of Carolingian minuscule. Edward added a colophon in rustic capitals (QUI LEGAT ORAT PRO SCRIPTORE EADVVARDO DIACONE – "may he who reads this pray for the scribe Edward the deacon").

The portrait of Luke, which is the only surviving original miniature, strongly resembles the Evangelist portraits of the Book of Mulling. The Anglo-Saxon miniatures are done in an early version of the Winchester Style and were influenced by Carolingian illumination. The manuscript originally contained decorated initials. These were erased in the 10th century and new zoomorphic initials were repainted in an Anglo-Saxon style. The placement of the initials is unusual because lines are rarely broken to start a new paragraph. The text usually continues and the initial is omitted from its proper place and is instead inserted into the margin. This system is used in some Greek manuscripts including the Codex Alexandrinus. There are gold crosses, which were probably also added in the 10th century, in the margins of John.

The manuscript is thought to have belonged to King Æthelstan, who may have ordered the 10th century "modernization". On folio 66 verso there is a partially erased 12th century inscription which reads "iste est liber sanct......" Also, on folio 66v are two ownership inscriptions. One indicates that in 1538 the book was owned by William Newman. The other indicates that in 1662 it was owned by Robert Lancaster. The manuscript was purchased by the British Museum at Sotheby's in 1922.
