= James Edwards (bookseller) =

English bookseller and bibliographer

James Edwards (1757–1816) was an English bookseller and bibliographer.

== Early life and family ==
Edwards was the eldest son of William Edwards (1720–1808) of Halifax, who in 1784 set up James and a younger son, John, as the firm of Edwards & Sons in Pall Mall, London. John died soon afterwards, and the business was continued by James. A third son, Thomas (d. 1834), was a bookseller in Halifax. Richard, another son, at one time held a government appointment in Minorca.

== Bookseller ==
Messrs. Edwards & Sons sold many valuable libraries. One sale in 1784 was formed principally from the libraries of N. Wilson of Pontefract and H. Bradshaw of Maple Hall, Cheshire. Among others dispersed in 1787 was the library of Dr. Peter Mainwaring. He made frequent business visits to the continent, and accompanied in 1788 his fellow-bookseller, James Robson, to Venice, in order to examine the Pinelli library, which they purchased and sold by auction the following year in Conduit Street, London. In 1790 Edwards disposed of the libraries of Salichetti of Rome and Zanetti of Venice, and in 1791 that of Paris de Meyzieu.

Edwards had purchased at the Duchess of Portland's sale in 1786 the Bedford Missal (a book of hours by the Bedford Master, more correctly the Bedford Hours), now in the British Library. It was described by Richard Gough in An Account of a Rich Illuminated Missal executed for John, duke of Bedford, Regent of France under Henry VI, 1794. dedicated by the author to Edwards. 'Let me recommend the youthful bibliomaniac to get possession of Mr. Edwards's catalogues, and especially that of 1794,' says Thomas Frognall Dibdin (Bibliomania, i. 123).

== Later life ==
Around 1804, having acquired a fortune, he decided to retire, and with the Bedford Missal and other literary and artistic treasures he went to live at a country seat in the neighbourhood of Old Verulam. He was succeeded by Robert Harding Evans. On 10 September 1805 he married Katharine, the only daughter of the Rev. Edward Bromhead, rector of Reepham, Norfolk, and about the same period bought the manor-house at Harrow, where some of the archbishops of Canterbury had once lived. The house was finely situated among gardens, in which was an alcove mentioned by Dibdin, some of whose imaginary bibliomaniacal dialogues are set in the surrounding grounds.

He died at Harrow 2 Jan. 1816, at the age of fifty-nine, leaving five children and a widow, who afterwards married the Rev. Thomas Butt of Kinnersley, Shropshire. His last instructions were that his coffin should be made out of library shelves. A monument to his memory, sculpted by Peter Turnerelli, is in Harrow Church.

== Legacy ==
Edwards was Dibdin's "Rinaldo, the wealthy, the fortunate, and the heroic". Some of his books were sold by Christie, 25–28 April 1804. The remainder, a choice collection of 830 articles, fetched the sum of £8,467. 10s. when it was sold by Evans 5–10 April 1815.
