= Book of Hours of Simon de Varie =

15th-century French illuminated manuscript

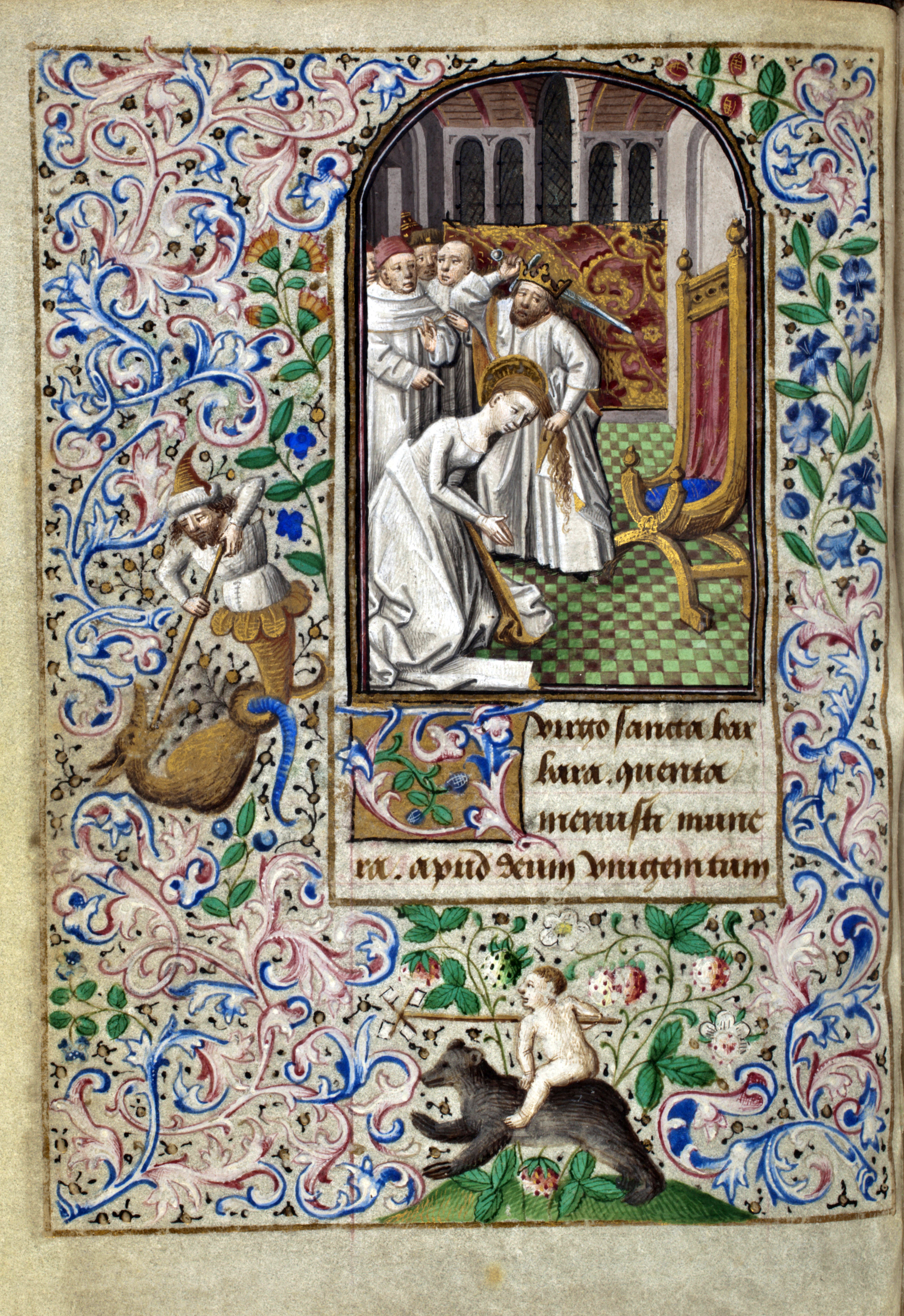
Book of Hours of Simon de Varie - KB 74 G37a - folio 019v

The Book of Hours of Simon de Varie (or the Varie Hours) is a French illuminated manuscript book of hours commissioned by the court official Simon de Varie, with miniatures attributed to at least four artists; hand A who may have been a workshop member of the Bedford Master, the anonymous illustrators known as the Master of Jean Rolin II, the Dunois Master (hand C) and the French miniaturist Jean Fouquet. It was completed in 1455 and consists of 49 large miniatures and dozens of decorative vignettes and painted initials, which total over 80 decorations. Fouquet is known to have contributed six full leaf illuminations, including a masterwork Donor and Virgin diptych. A number of saints appear - Saint Simon (de Varie's patron saint) is placed as usual alongside Saint Jude (folio 41); other pages feature saints Bernard of Menthon, James the Greater and Guillaume de Bourges.

The book was divided into 3 volumes by its 17th century owner Philippe de Béthune. Two are currently housed at National Library of the Netherlands, in The Hague and were acquired in 1816 and 1890. The third was long thought to be lost, but resurfaced in 1983 when it was rediscovered by art historian and medievalist James Marrow in the possession of an antiquarian bookseller in San Francisco. That volume contains 97 leaves, and is today in the Getty Center in Los Angeles.

The book is unusually ornate and beautiful, and measures 11.7 cm x 8.5 cm. The two Hague volumes have identical armorial bindings added by their 17th-century owner Philippe de Béthune (1561–1649). Its first major art historical treatment was published in 1902 by Paul Durrieu.

== The patron ==
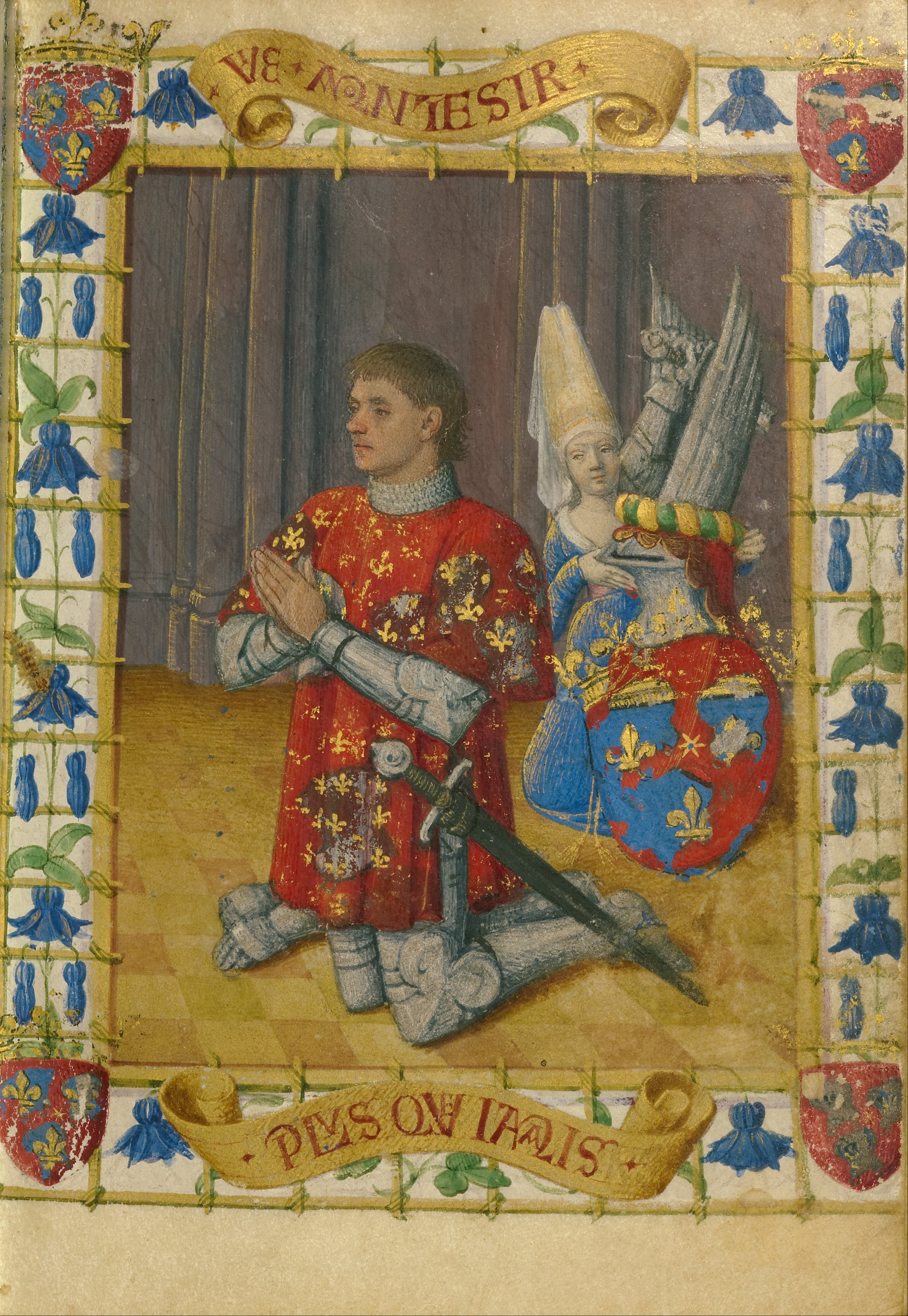
Jean Fouquet, Simon de Varie Kneeling in Prayer

Simon de Varie was born in Bourges as the son of a textile merchant. Although from a wealthy family, after a promising start, he had only a modest career as a crown officer under Kings Charles VII and Louis XI. There is little record of his life. He lived and worked in Paris, and numerous elements of the illuminations can be associated with France.

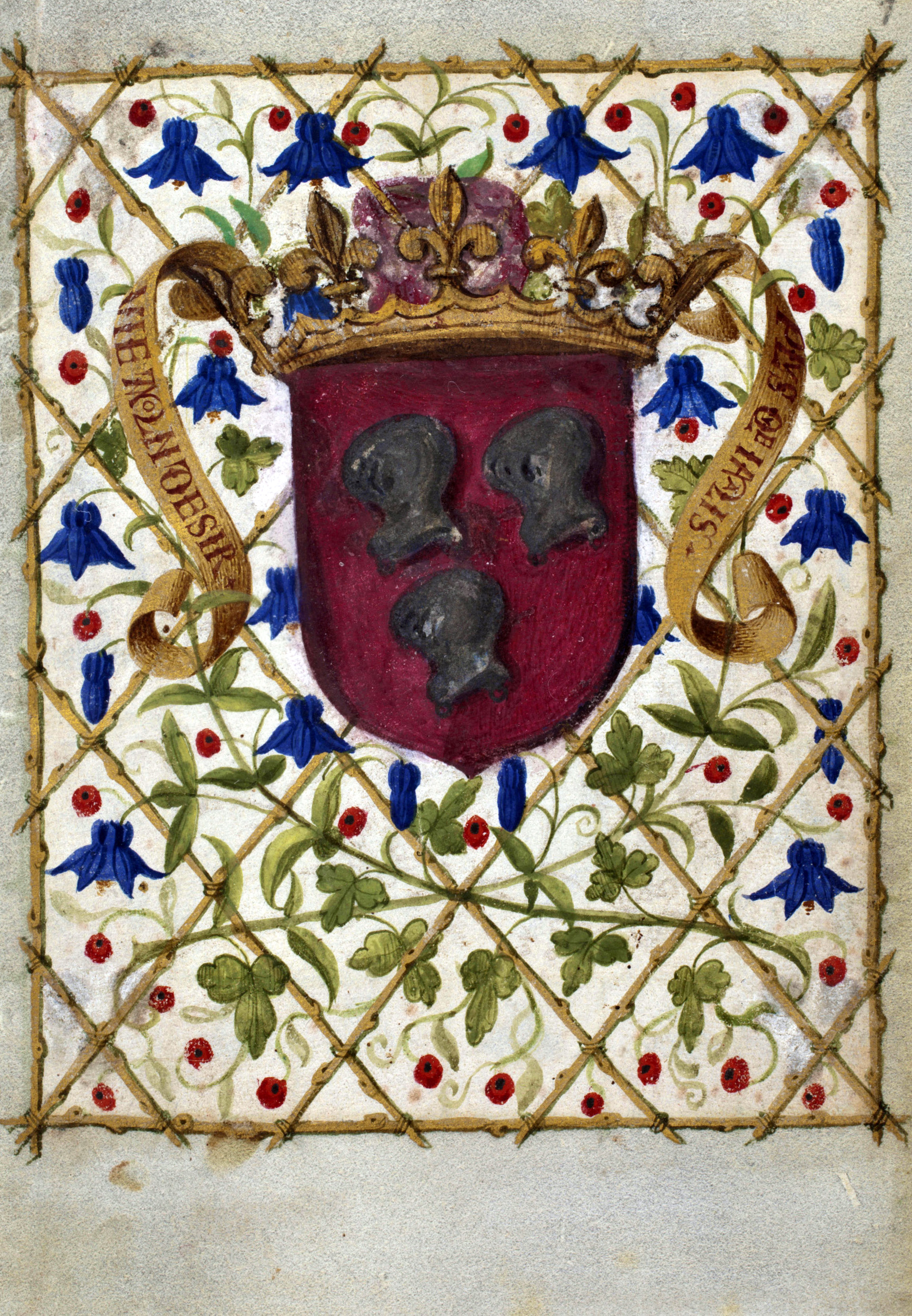
Folio showing coat of arms

His identity as patron was not established until the third volume in San Francisco was attributed. Art historian François Avril determined that the motto Vie a mon desir, which appears on a filo of a kneeling man dressed in armour and red garments replete with heraldic images, was an anagram of "Simon de Varie". De Varie has not been in the military, but is nonetheless shown wearing armour, perhaps aspirationally. His portrait is half of a diptych; the Virgin appears in a separate, opposite miniature, which is linked by floor tiles sharing a single vanishing point to those on de Varie's page. Behind him is a female heraldic figure wearing a long, veiled hennin. She holds a escutcheon (shield), crowned with a helmet and chest.

de Varie probably commissioned the book to celebrate his appointment as crown officer, a position he hoped would mark the beginning of his elevation on the social ladder.

== Margins ==
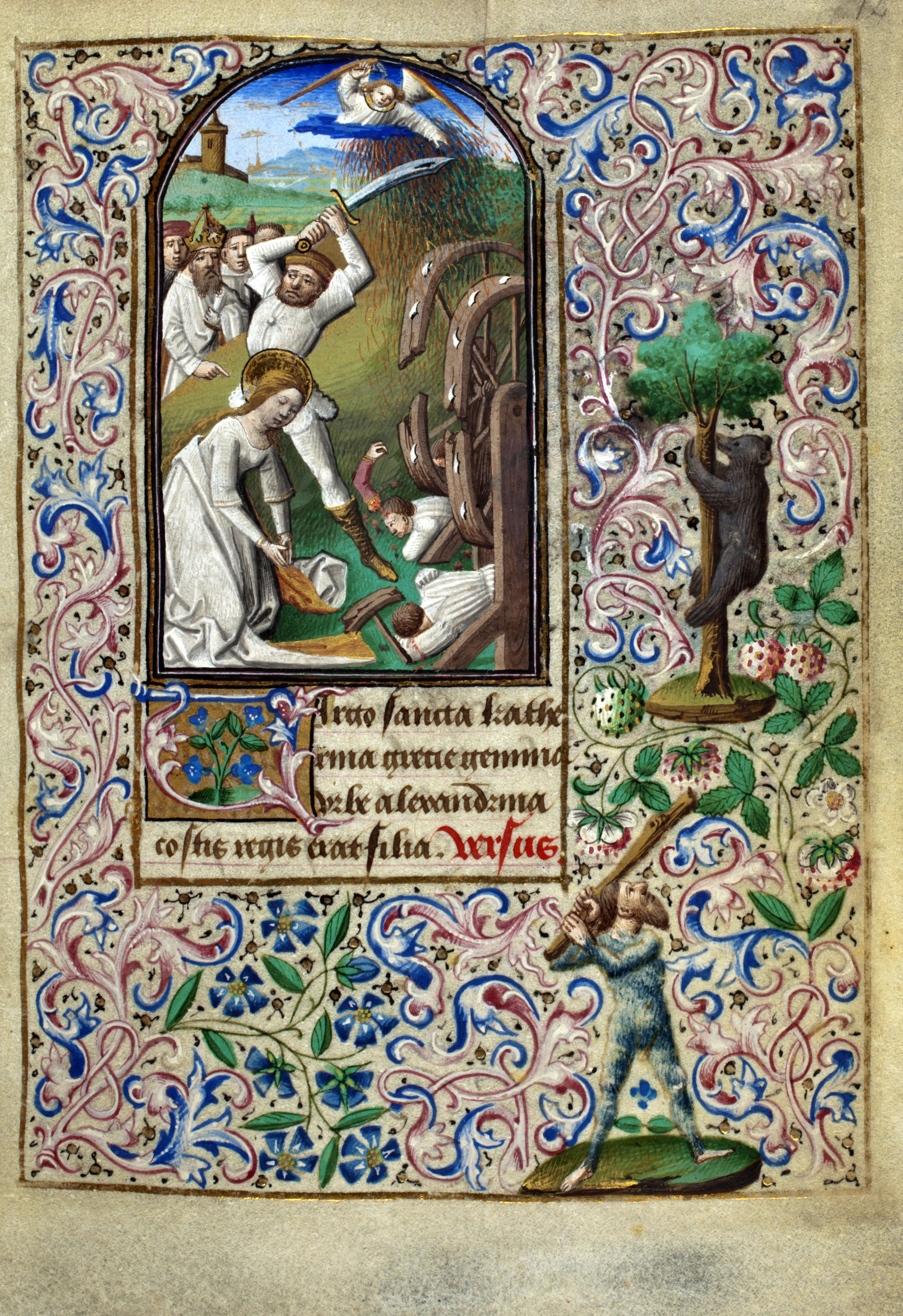
The martyrdom of St. Catherine of Alexandria - she is about to be beheaded - Folio 014r

The border decorations are set within elaborate depictions of foliage. Blue, rose red and milk white hues predominate, while the initials and parts of the branchwork are lined with gold coloured paint. The foliage consists of intertwined branches, heavily decorated leaves and flowers interwoven with figures, animals, birds and fantastic human or animal forms (grotesques). Coats of arms similar to those in the donor leaf appear in the borders of the page, though they have been painted over.

The names of saints, feast days and titles of the months are sprinkled across different pages, inked in red, blue and white to echo the colours of the foliage. Marrow describes the colourisation as creating a "harmonious relationship between text and decoration". The reds and blues of the decorations match those of the text, while the milk white pigment blends with the vellum from which the manuscript is constructed.

The figures on the margins are generally shown in motion: gesticulating, turning or twisting inwards towards the text or paintings on the main body of their page.

== Artists and sequence ==
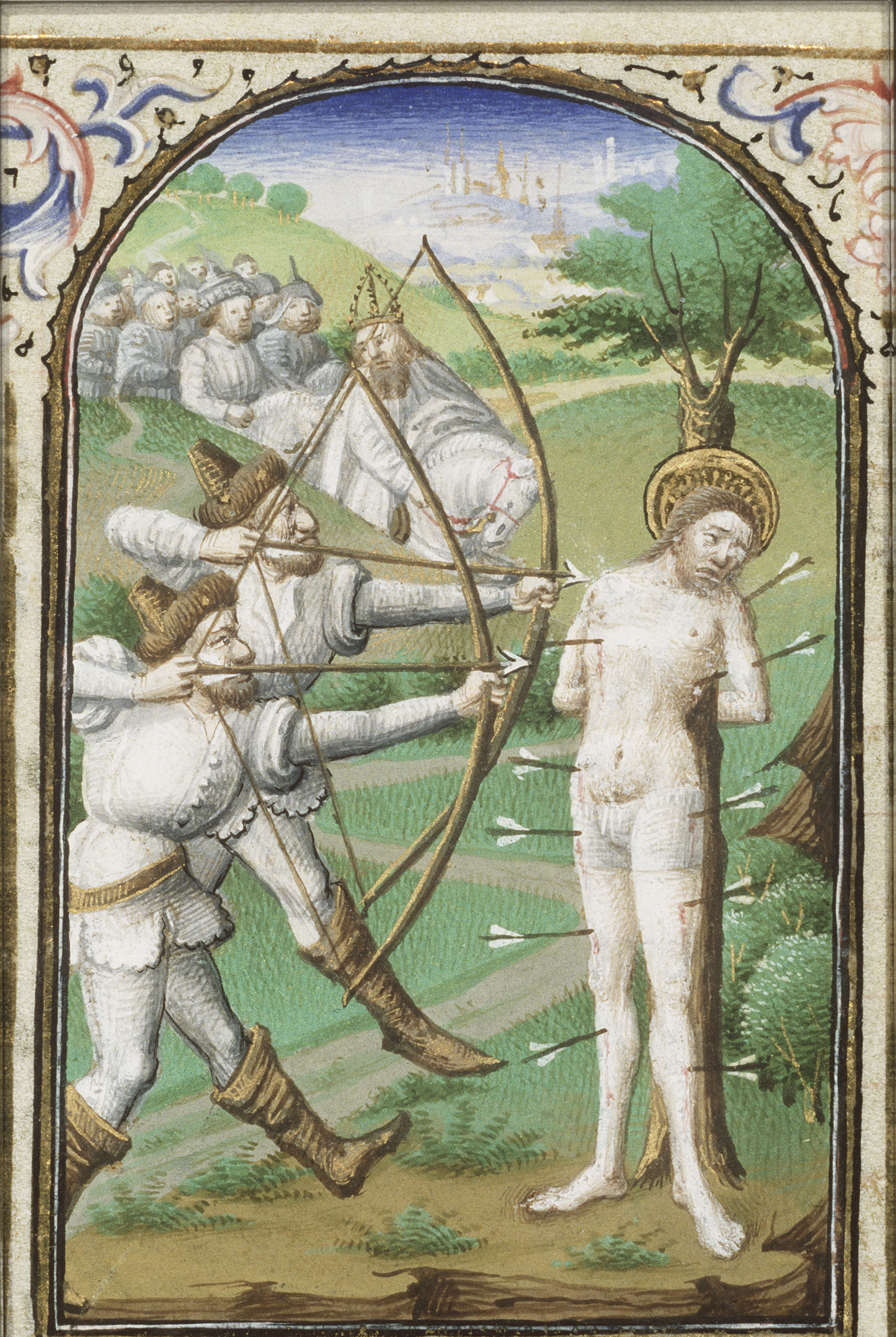
Folio 076v, Martyrdom of Saint Sebastian, tied to a tree, he is pierced by arrows

The presence of at least four hands suggests that the worked at the same place, but at different stages. There are no records of the commission, so their identity has been built up through their similarity to other works and by associating stylistic traits. Hand A was identified as the "chief associate" of the Bedford Master by Marrow. The artist was described in 1966 as "easy to recognise because he paints carelessly with strong mannerisms of form and colour ... the broad shape of ... heads, the blond hair, the fussy folds of clothing". Hand B (the Master of Jean Rolin) contributions are largely in line with the then tradition of French manuscript illustration. He is identified with the illustrations on the 12 calendar pages. These contain roundel in the left margins, representation occupations usually associated with the months of the year. The lower borders and left margins contain zodiac symbols.

The calendars are followed by illustrations from the Gospels, followed by portraits of the evangelists. Both sequences are attributed to hand A (workshop of the Bedford Master), and are typical of the artist's manner; round, soft features and forms set in tight and crowded spaces. Matthew, Luke and Mark are set in interior settings, surrounded by iconography usually related to them. John is shown on the island of Pamtos with an eagle to his left, and a daemon to his right.

Hand A is also associated with the following pages, which consist essentially of hymns and prayers to Mary. In the first two pages she is accompanied by angels playing music, with the Christ child in front of her; seated on the floor or leafing through a book.

== Jean Fouquet ==
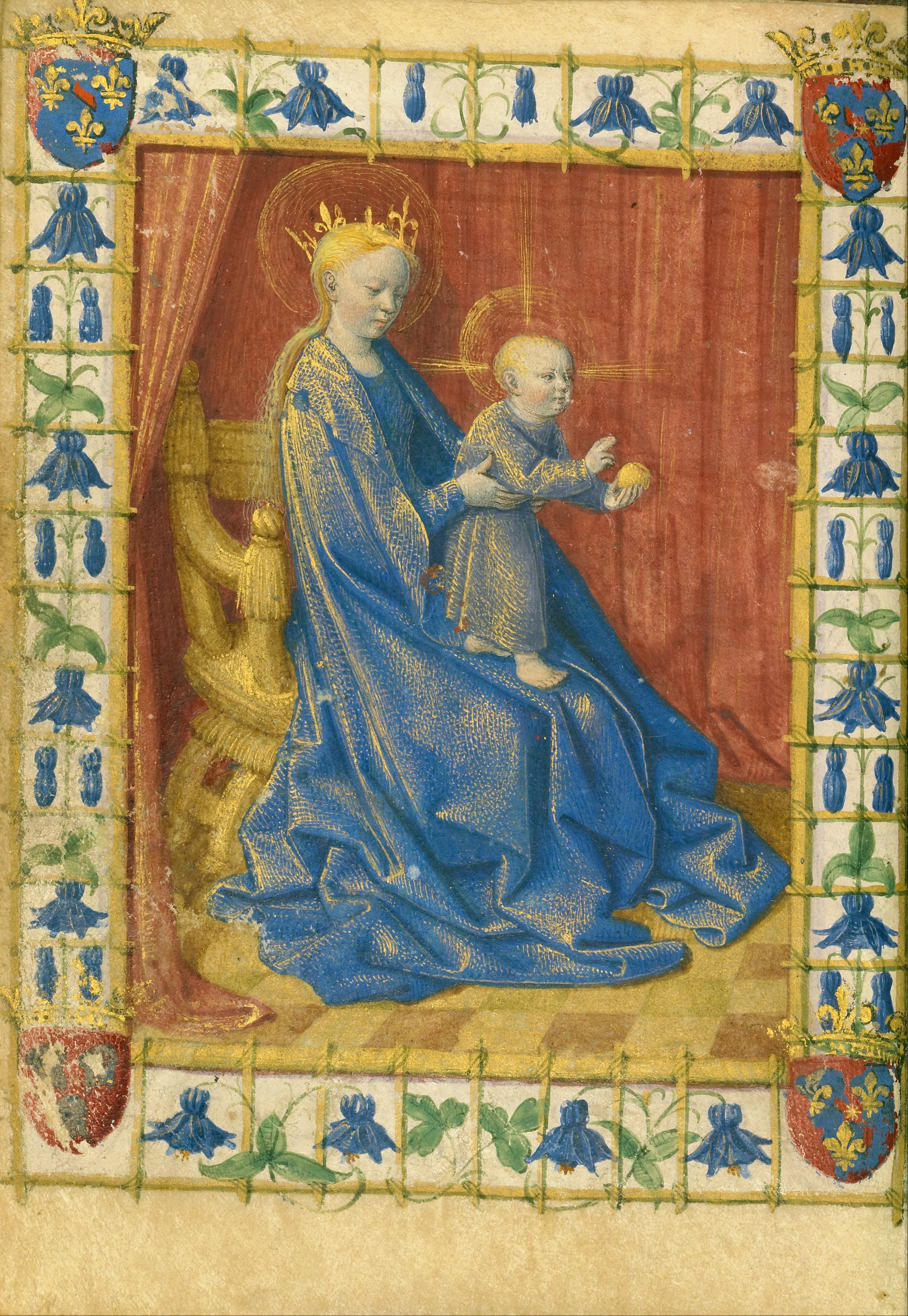
Jean Fouquet, The Virgin and Child Enthroned, half of a diptych (see above)

The volume now in the Hague (KB 74 G 37) is known to have been in the possession of Samuel van Huls of Delft (1596–1687), William of Orange, William IV, and William I of the Netherlands (1772–1843), who bequeathed in 1816. The second volume (KB 74 G 37a) was purchased in 1890 from Joseph Baer, Frankfurt, who had acquired it in 1882 from the estate of Firmin Didot.

Sometime after the book was divided in three, the location of the volume now in the Getty was lost. It was discovered in 1983 in the collection of the bibliophiles and numismatists Mr and Mrs Gerald F Borrmann of Lafayette, California. Borrmann had contacted the book dealer Warren Howell seeking help in attributing a French illuminated manuscript he had acquired in London in 1979, and of which he knew little.

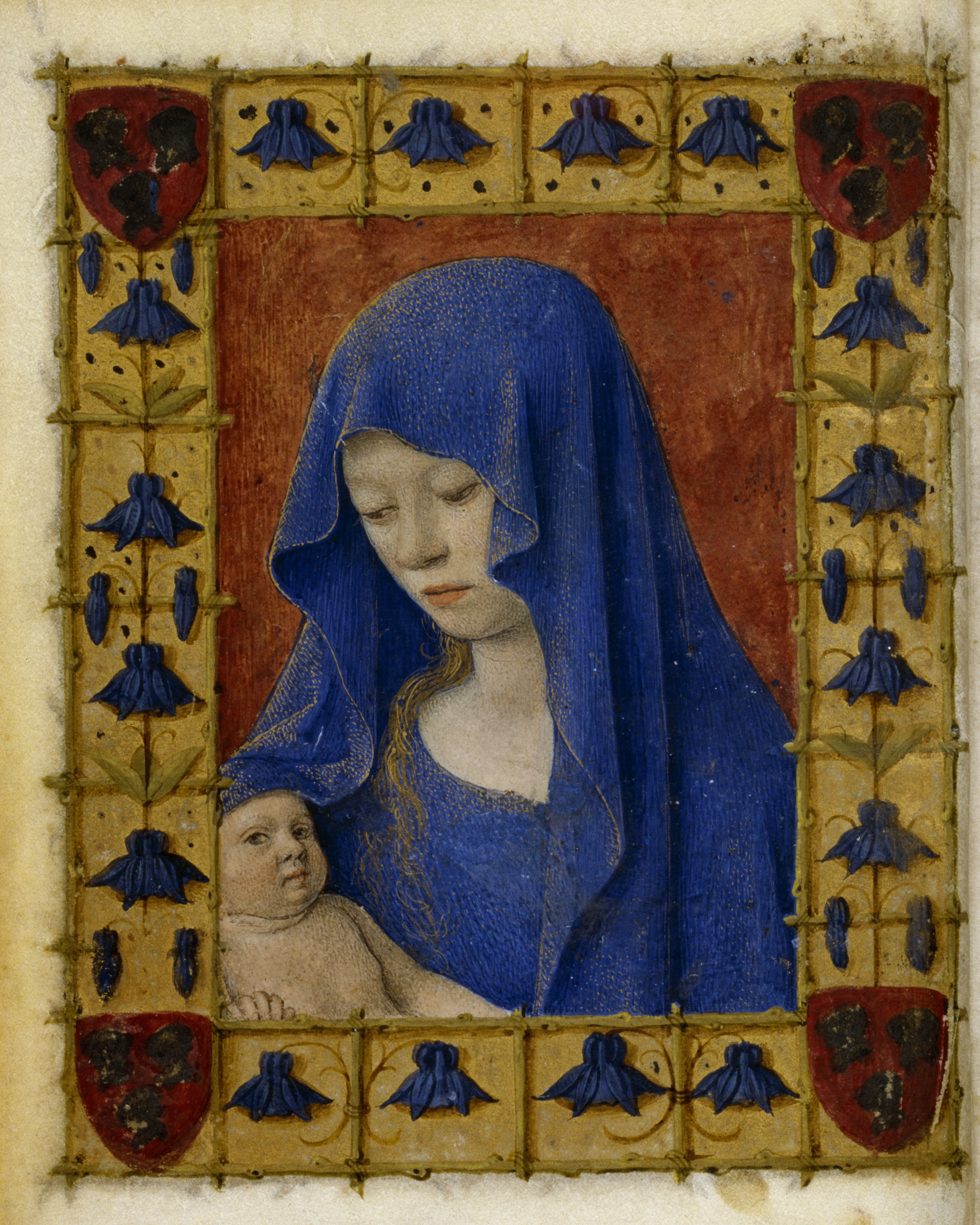
Jean Fouquet, Mary holding the Christ-child. 74 G 37a 1v

Fouquet would have greatly overshadowed the other hands in terms of stature, and it is thought likely that, given he is attributed with just five leaves, he was commissioned to "dress up and personalise" the book.

Marrow describes being left speechless as he realised that the style and four front piece illuminations could be attributed Jean Fouquet, the preeminent French painter of the 15th century. Marrow further established that the fragment was the third part of a known Book of hours, though it was not then known who had commissioned the two extant volumes in the Hague.

Fouquet is now credited with six miniatures near the opening pages of the book. They consist of three double sized leaf's, with the Madonna with the Christ child now recognised as a masterpiece for its beauty, and evocation of tenderness and intimacy. Although she holds him aloft, mother and child are intertwined in subtle ways, including the manner in with her overhanging veil overhanging veil partly covers his head. The artist includes a trompe-l'œil - the child's hand extends across onto the decorative border. On the opposite page, Christ is shown water, in an illustration where milk white is the dominating colour.

== Leaves ==
=== KB 74 G 37 ===
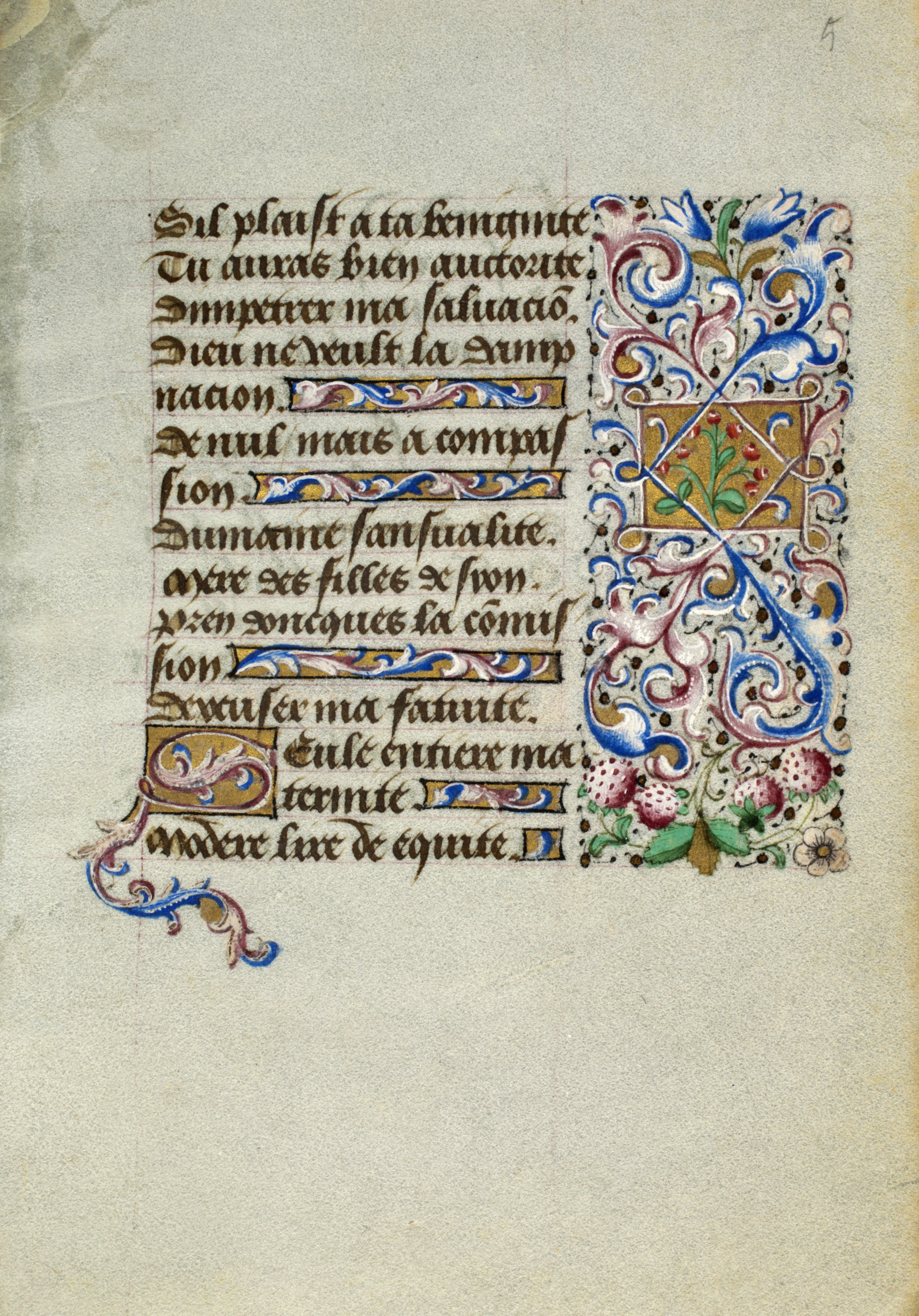
Folio 005r

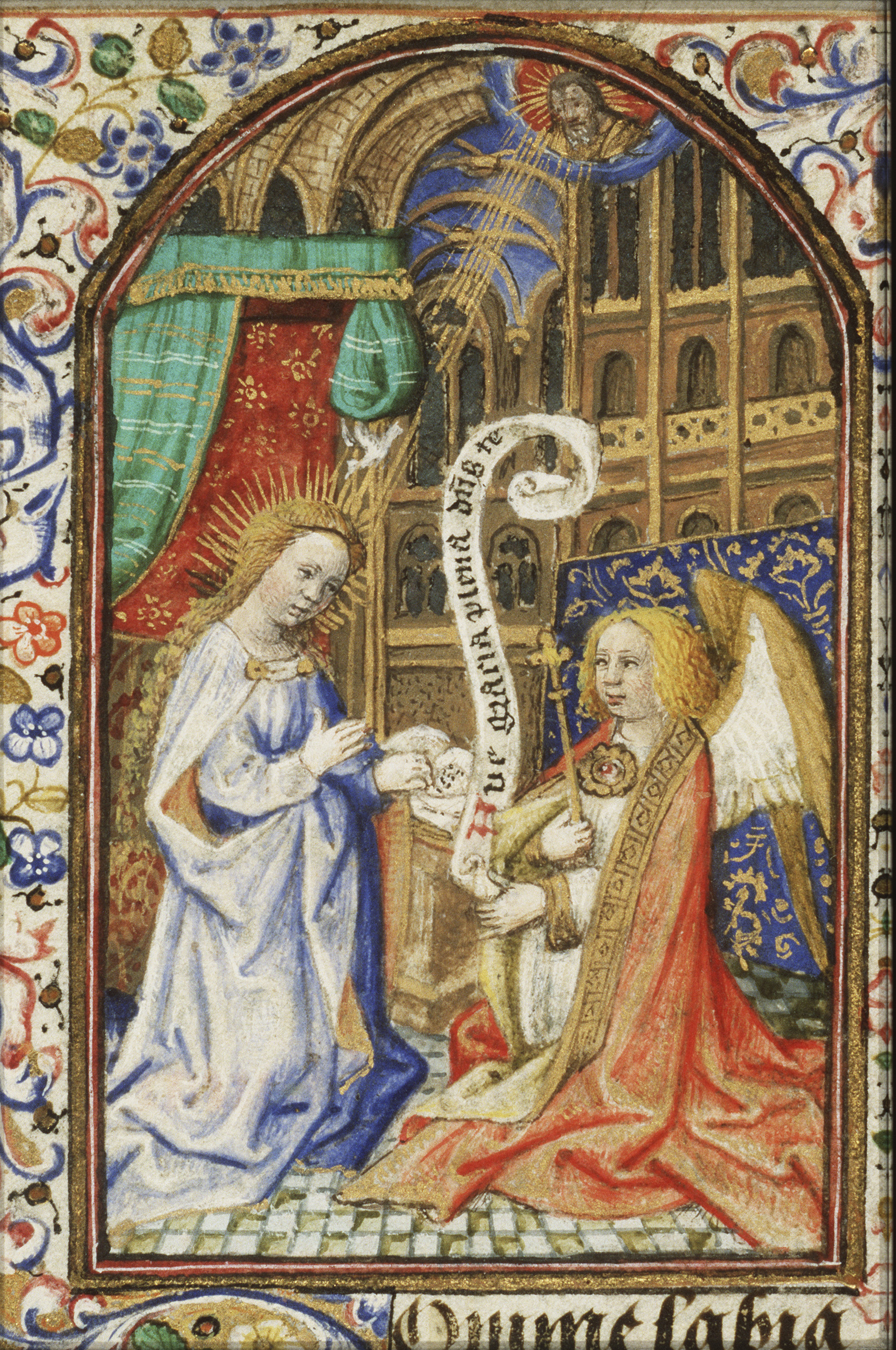
The Annunciation - Gabriel announces Christ's birth to Mary - miniature on folio 025r

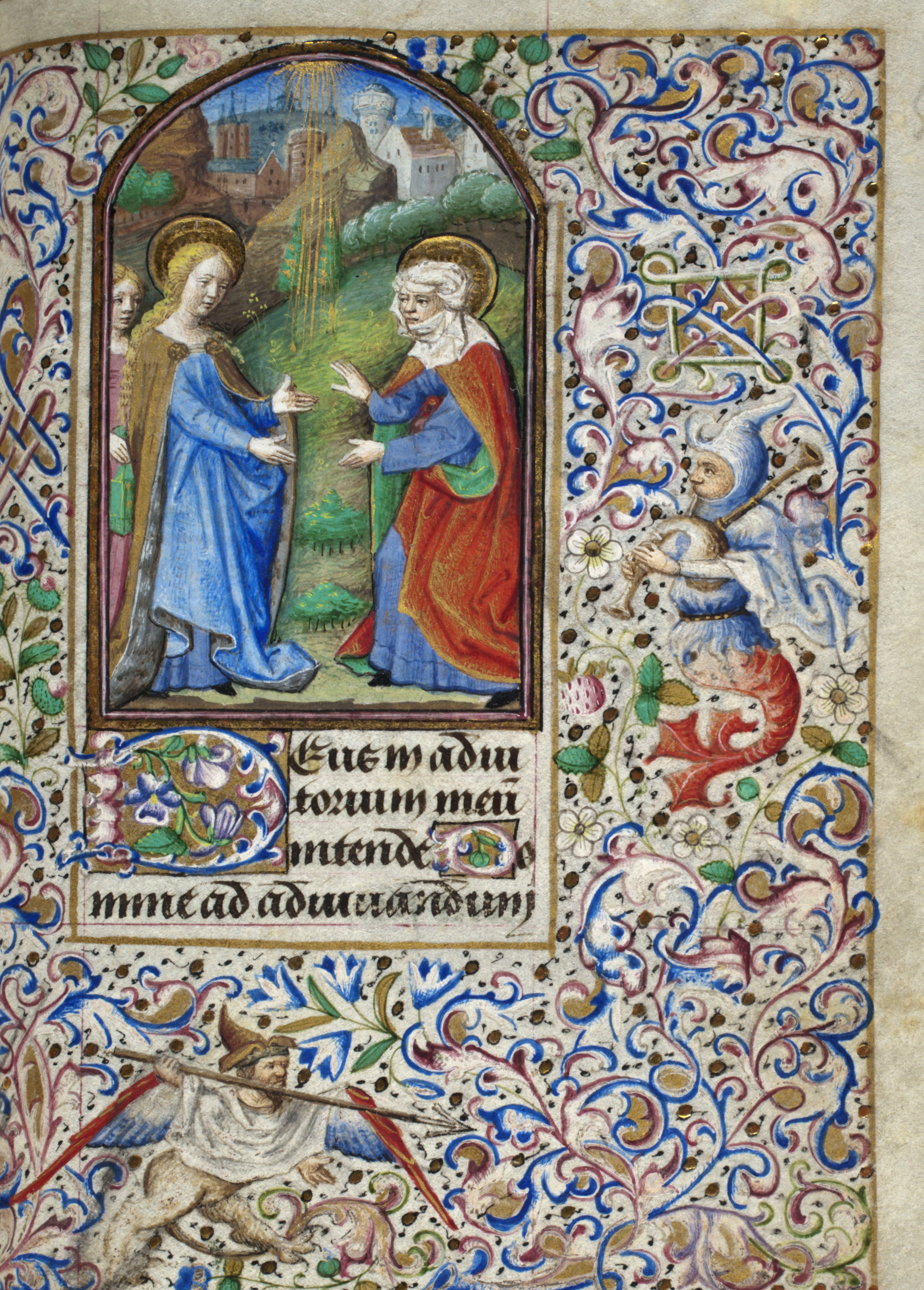
Folio 053r

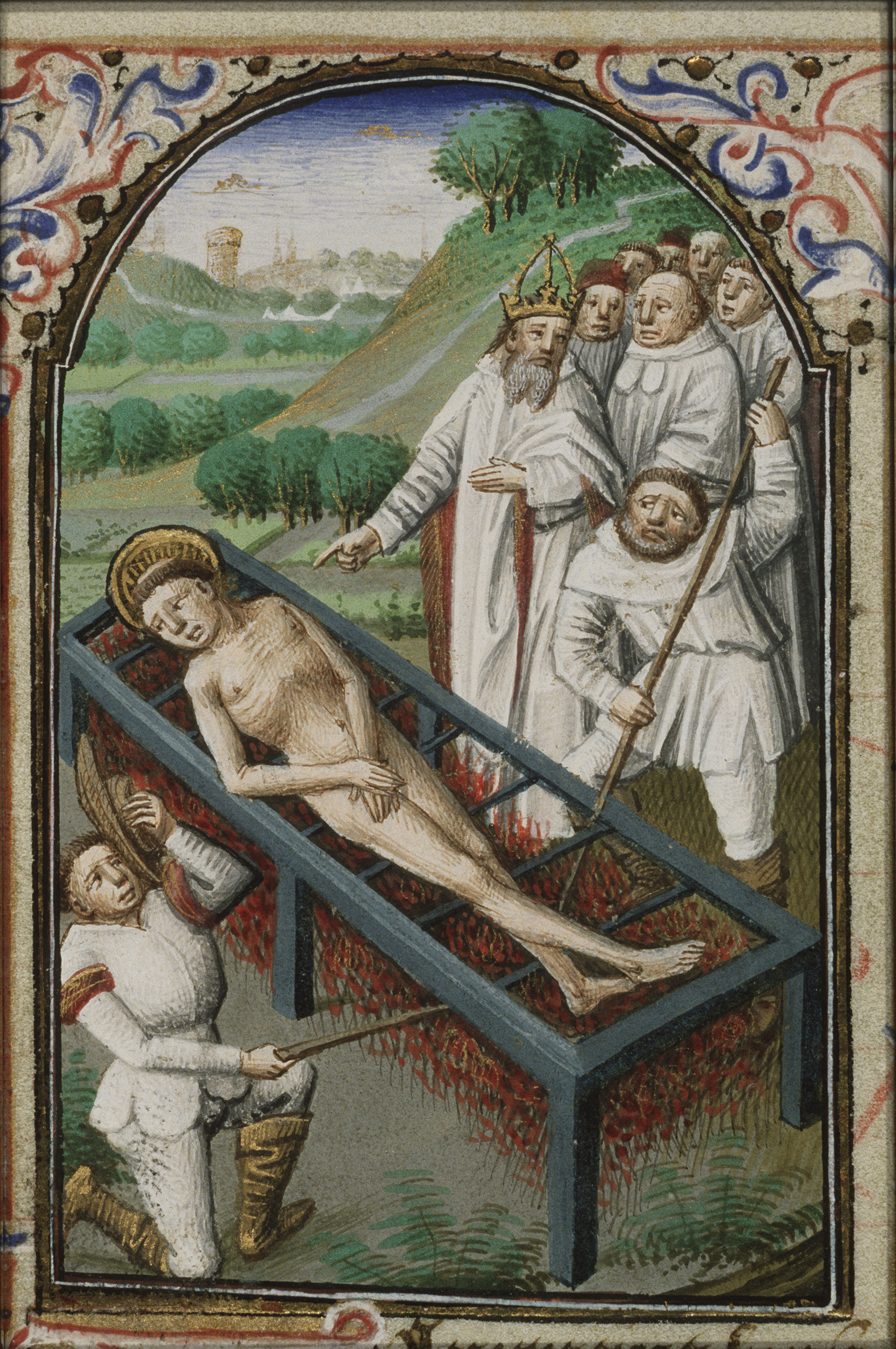
The martyrdom of St. Laurence of Rome - he is roasted on a gridiron - miniature on folio 073v

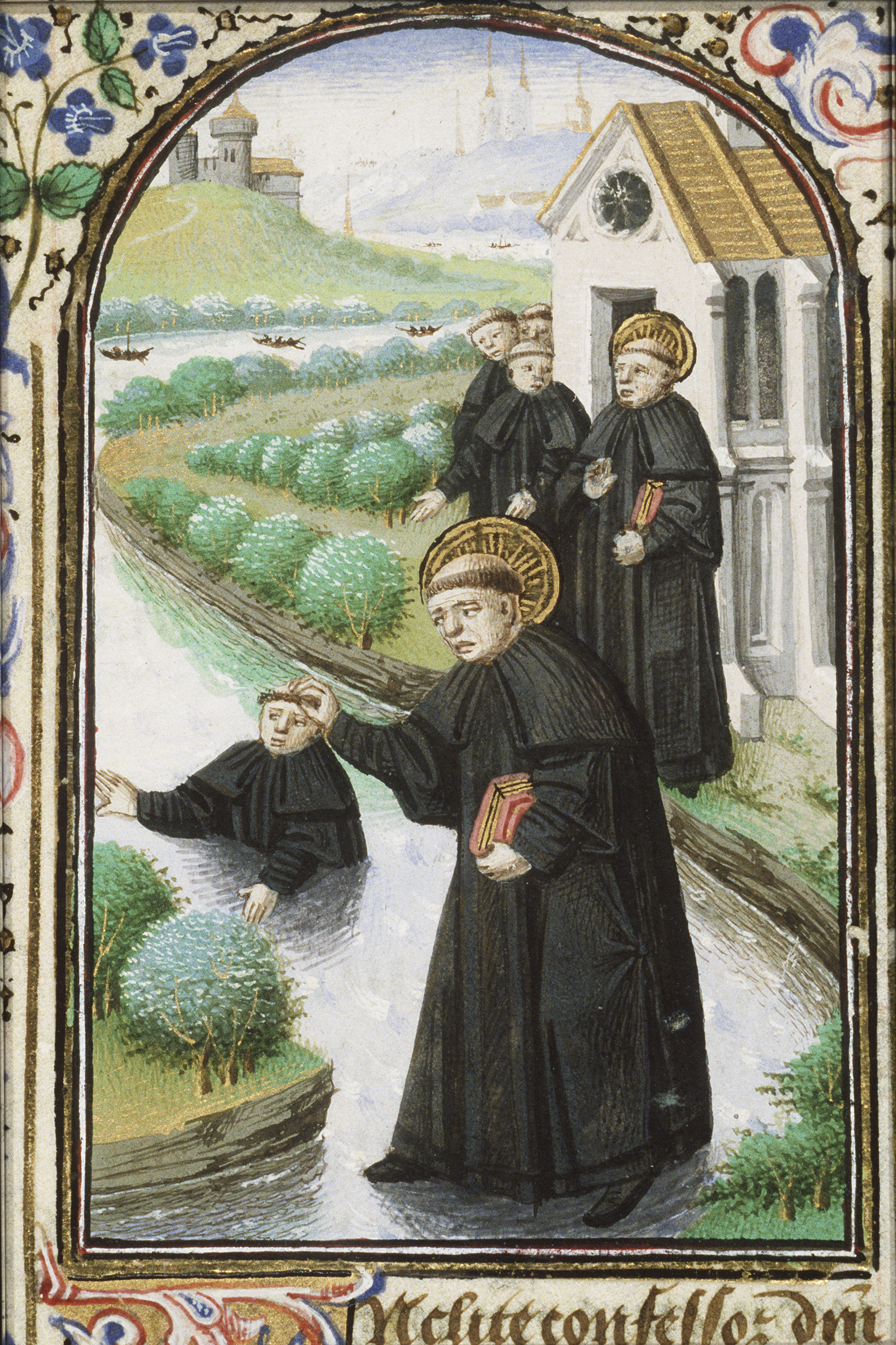
St. Maurus of Glanfeuil, walking on the water, saves St. Placidius from drowning - miniature on folio 083r

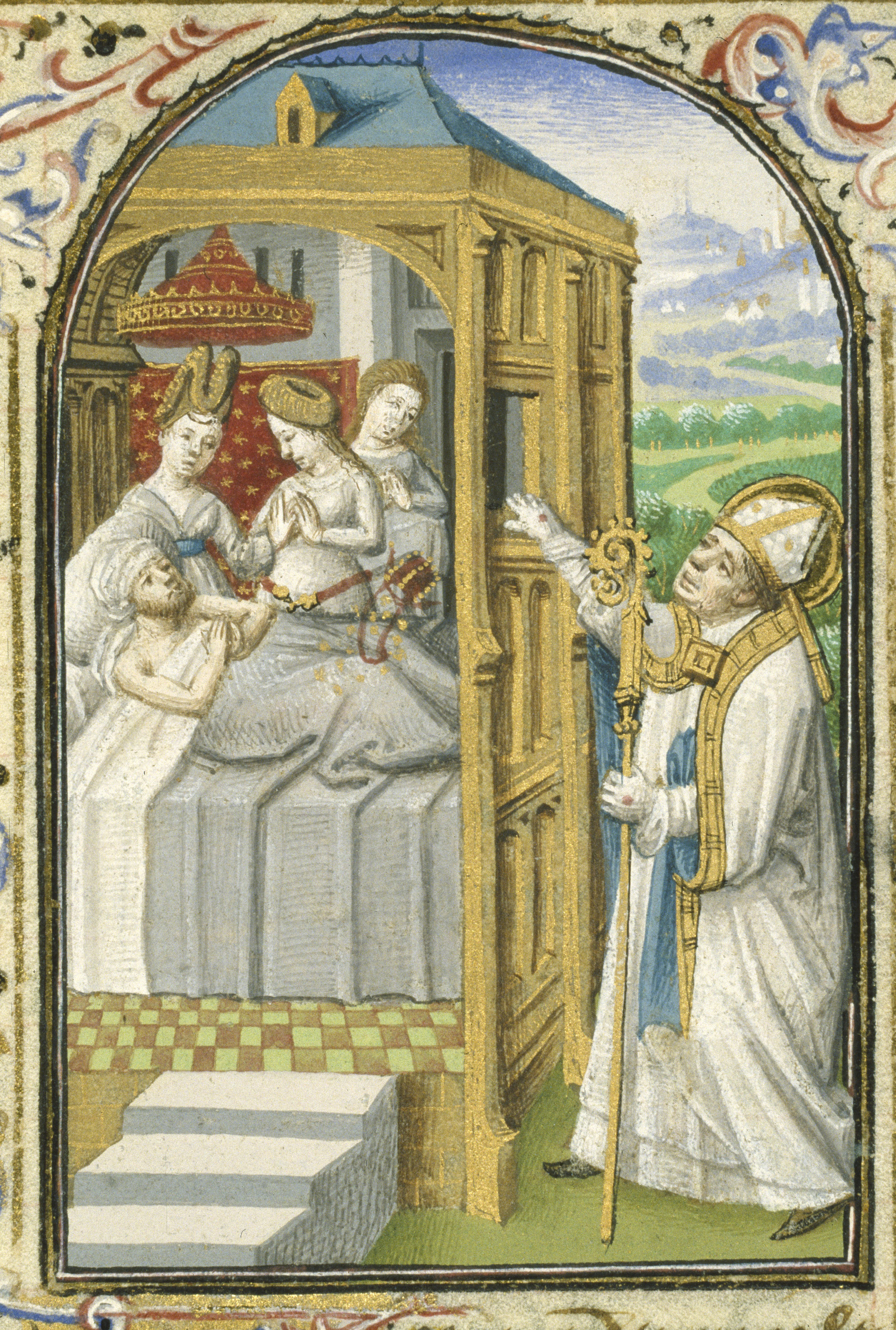
St. Nicholas, Bishop of Myra, gives secretly dowries to three poor girls - miniature on folio 084r

=== KB 74 G 37a ===
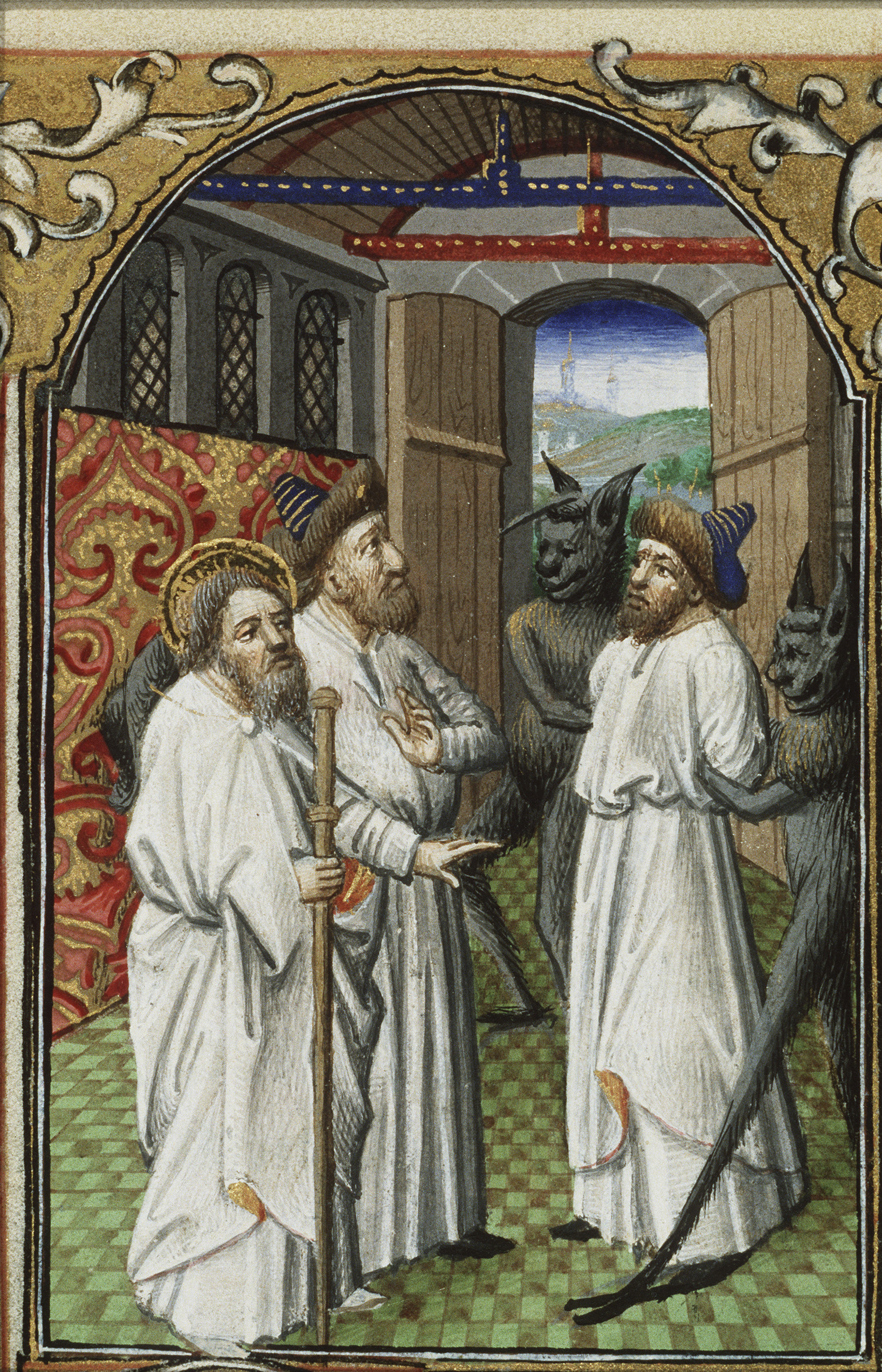
Conversion of Hermogenes by St. James the Great - miniature on folio 006v

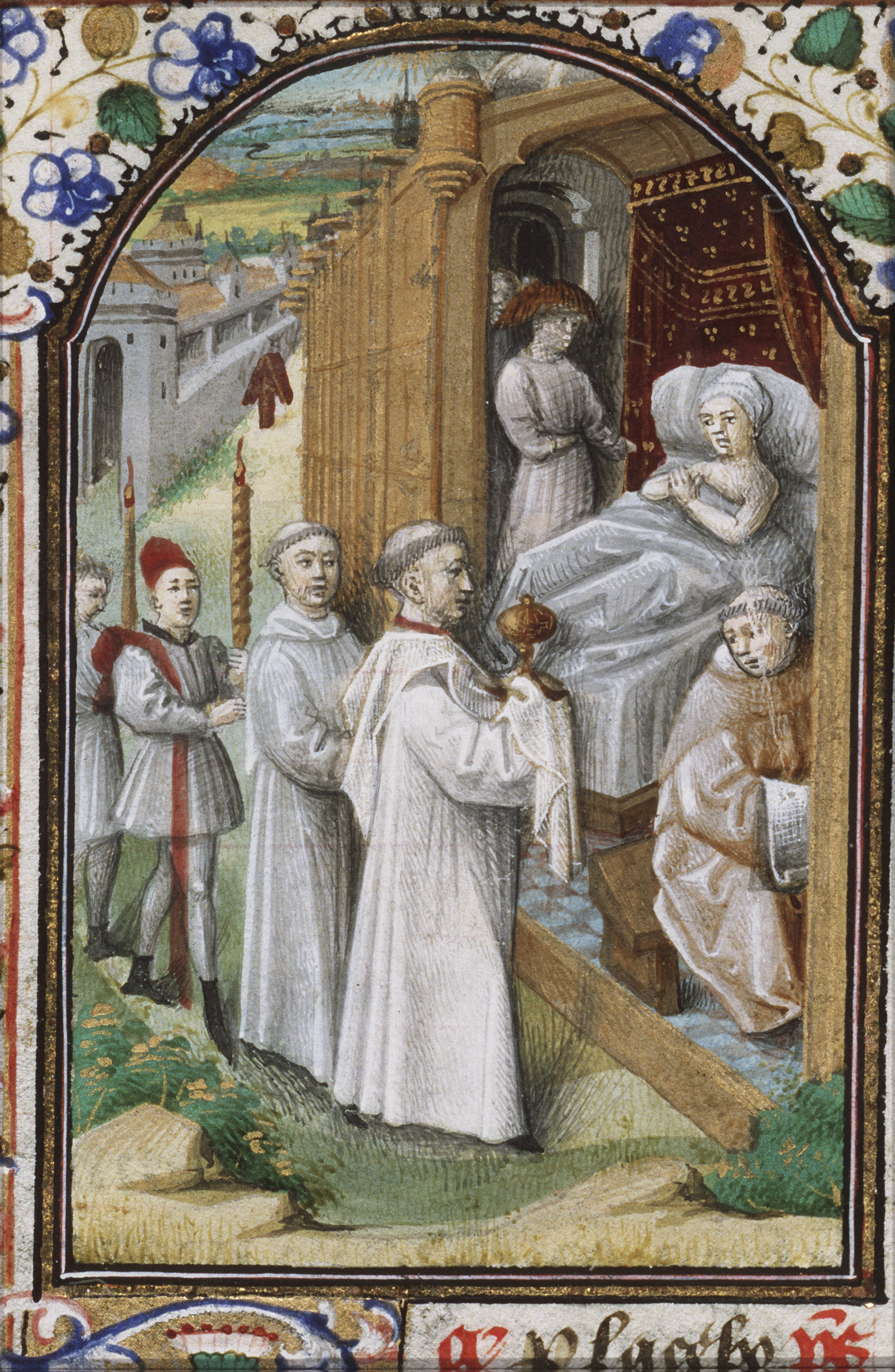
A priest on his way to a dying person to administer extreme unction - Miniature on folio 037r

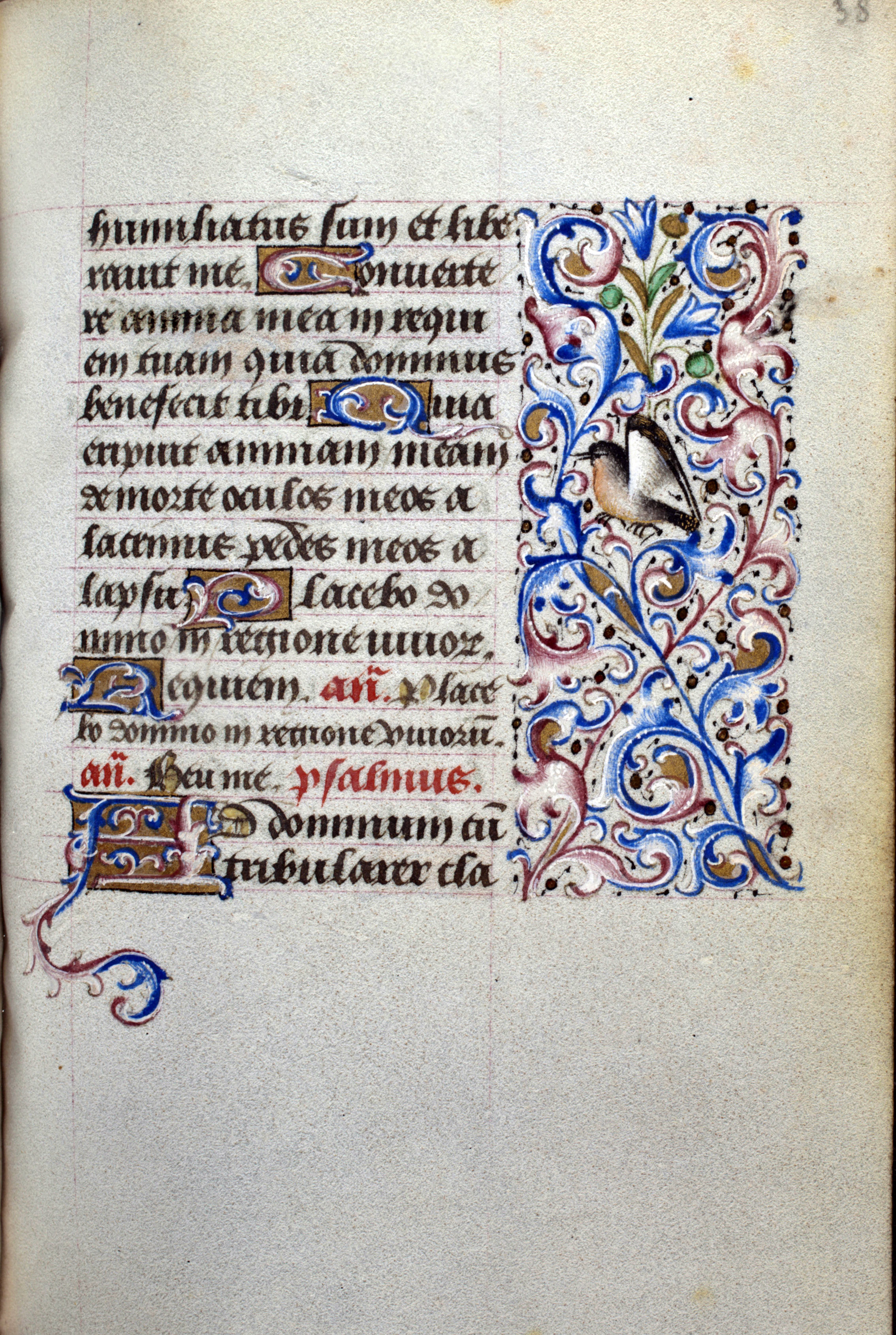
Folio 038r

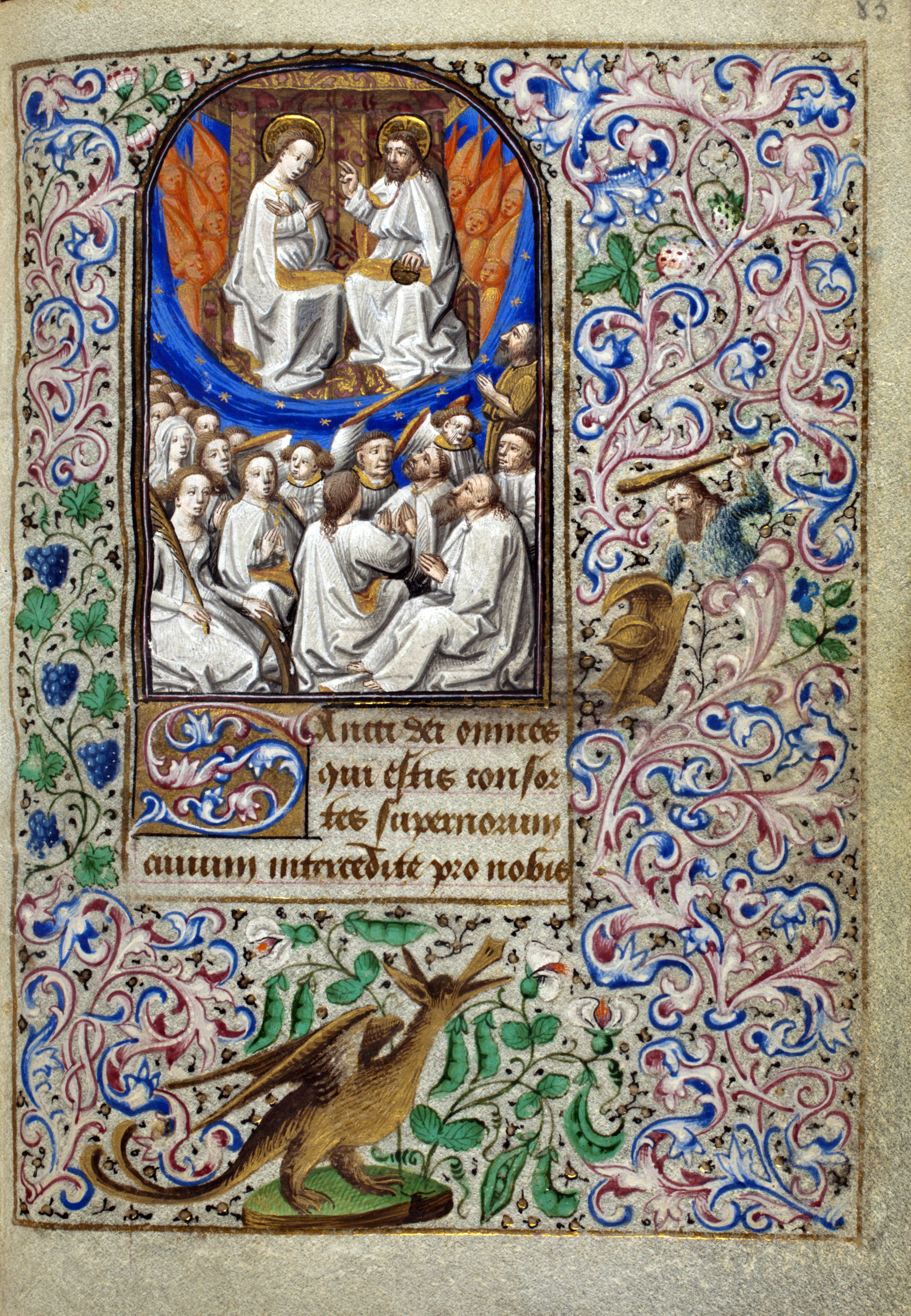
Folio 083r

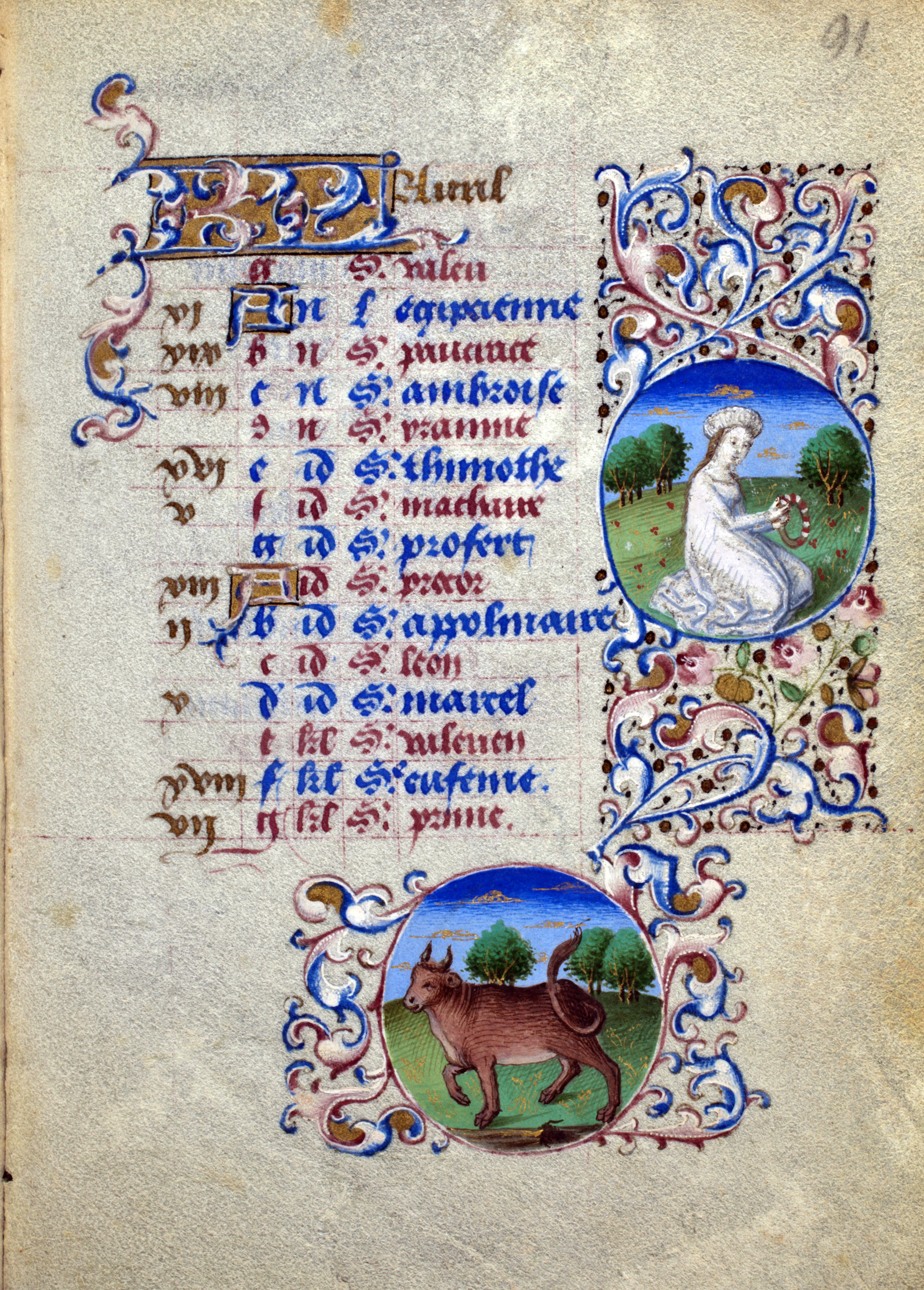
Calendar April - folio 091r

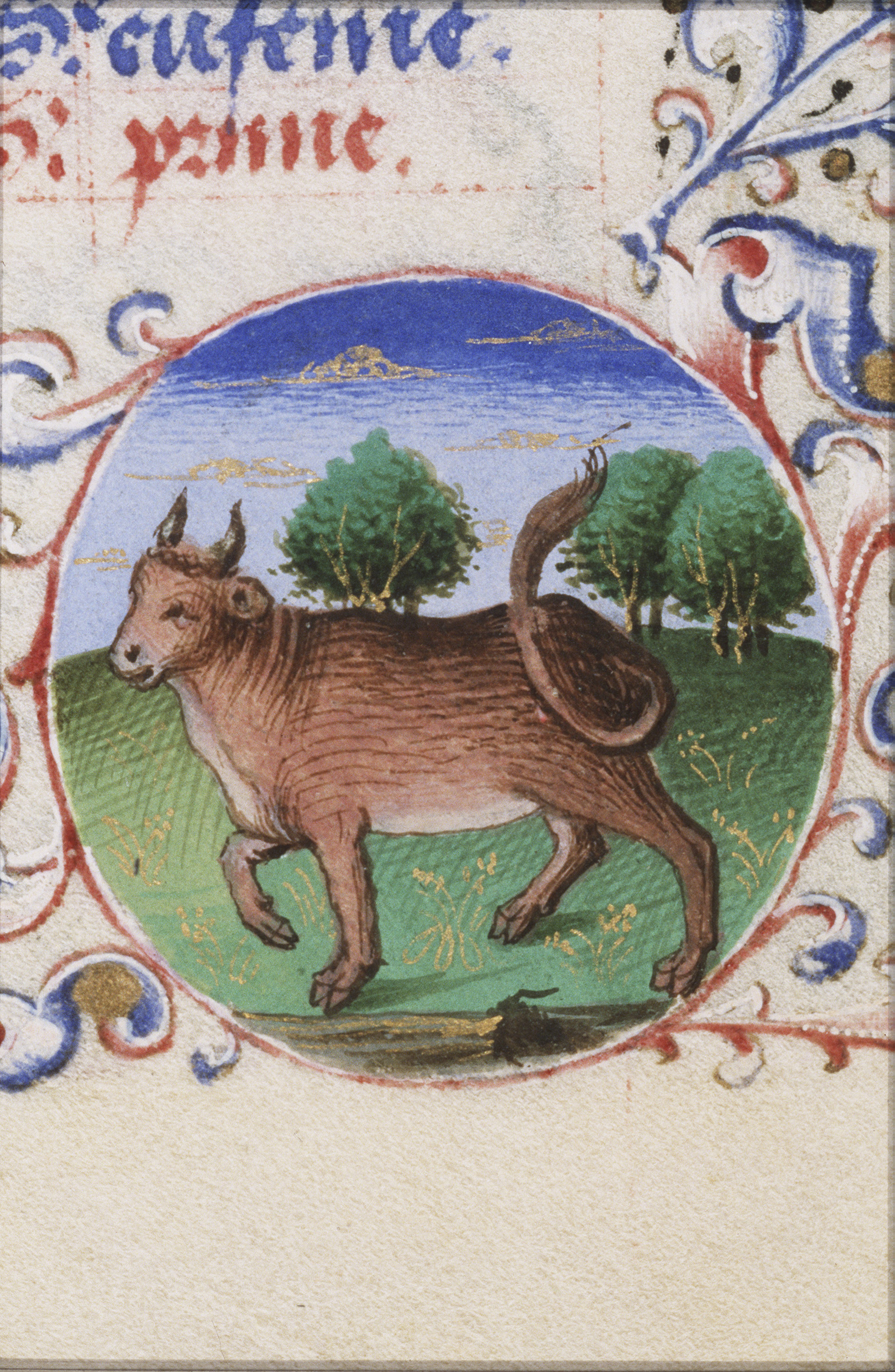
April - Taurus

=== Getty Ms 7 ===
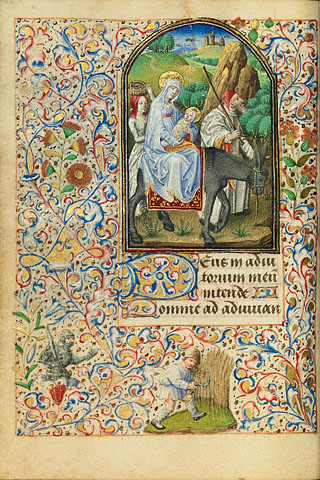
La Fuite en Egypte; Ms.7, folio 28, verso

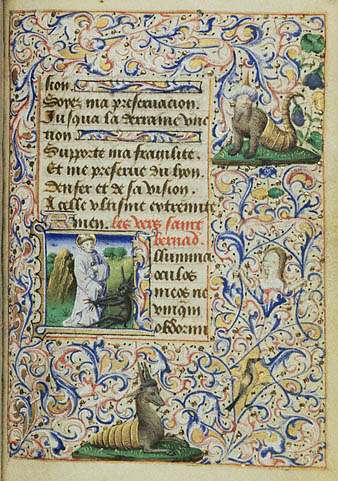
Saint Bernard avec le démon enchaîné; Ms.7, folio 72

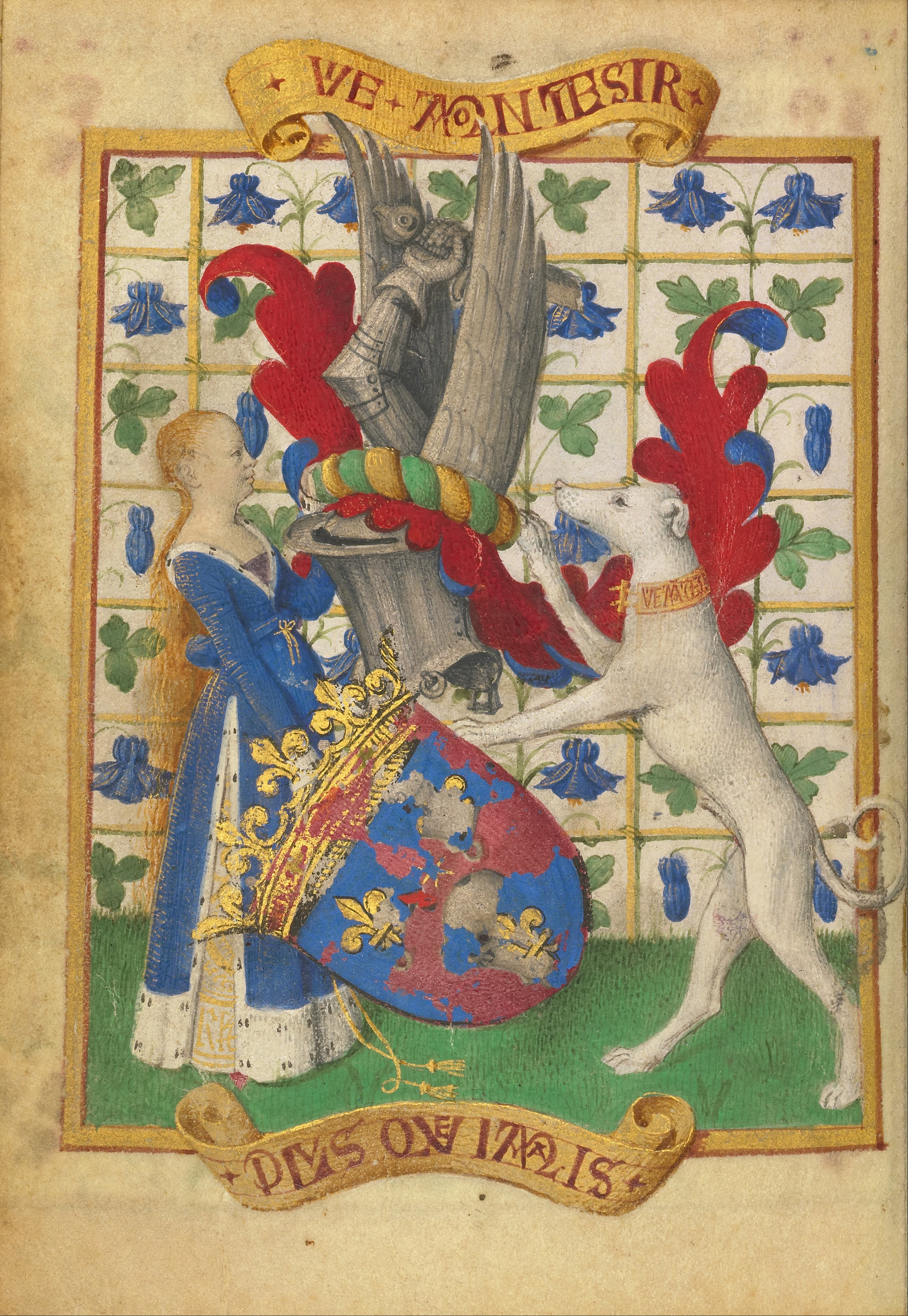
Jean Fouquet, Coat of Arms Held by a Woman and a Greyhound; Ms. 7, folio 2V
