= Bedford Hours =

Illuminated book of hours

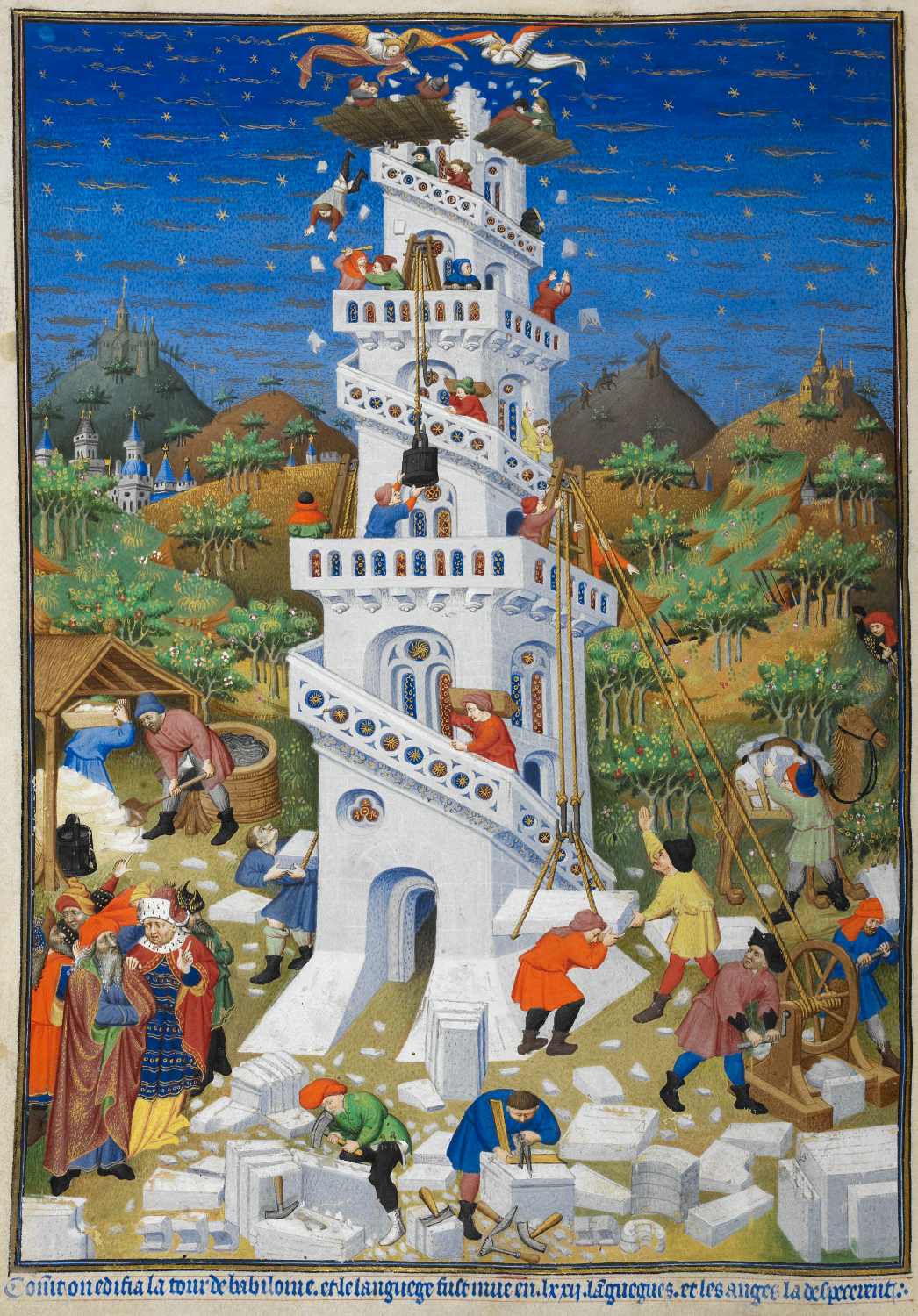
Folio 17v, showing the building of the Tower of Babel

The Bedford Hours is a French late medieval book of hours. (Note: Not to be confused with the Bedford Psalter and Hours, BL Add MS 42131.) It dates to the early fifteenth century (c. 1410–30); some of its miniatures, including the portraits of the Duke and Duchess of Bedford, have been attributed to the Bedford Master and his workshop in Paris. The Duke and Duchess of Bedford gave the book to their nephew Henry VI in 1430. It is in the British Library, catalogued as Add MS 18850.

== History ==
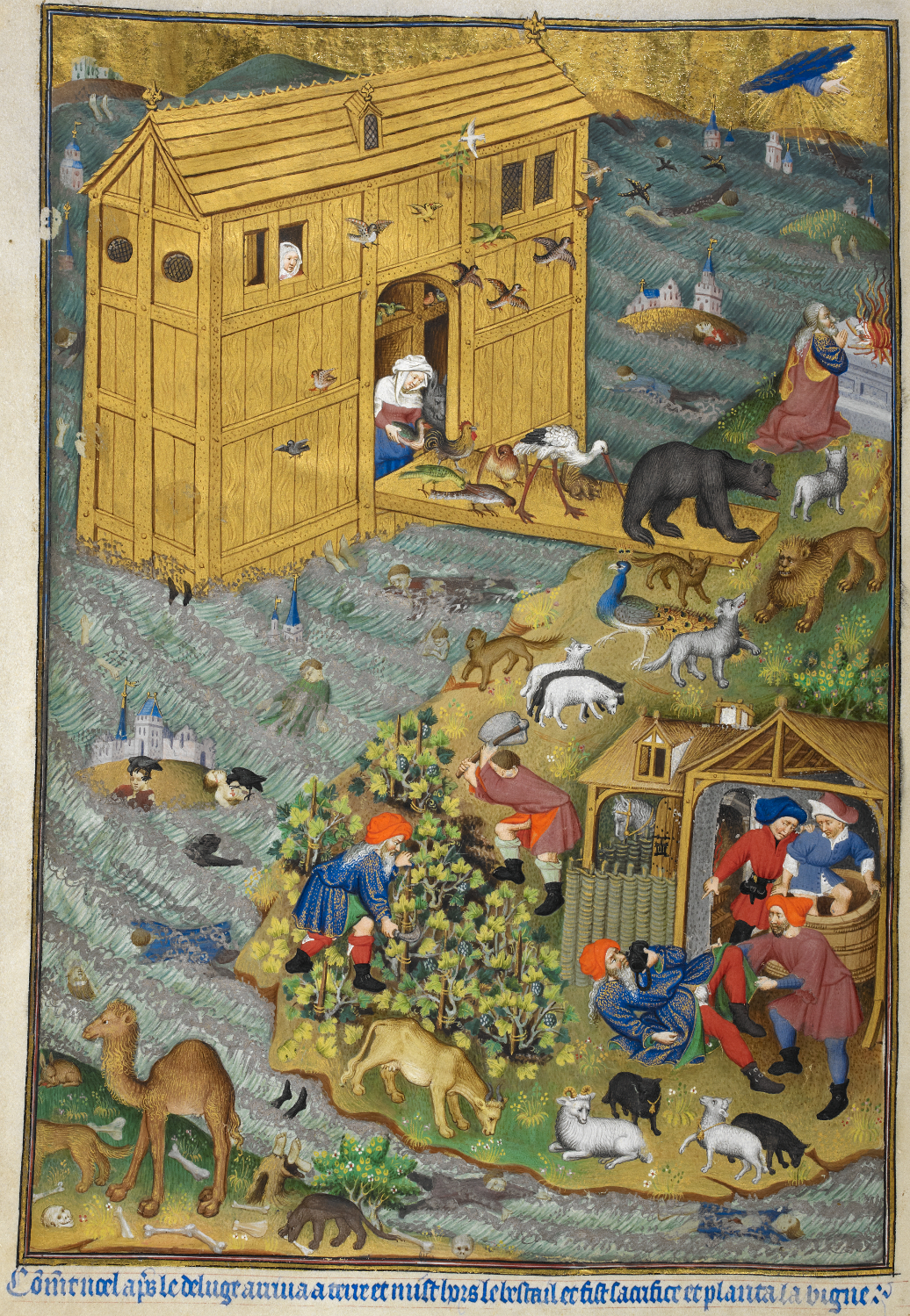
The exit from Noah's Ark, f. 16v

The manuscript was produced over several stages, including new material that was added as the manuscript passed from owner to owner. The origins of the manuscript are not known with certainty, nor is there agreement on its initial patron. The inclusion of certain heraldic symbols in its decorative programme may suggest an original patronage in the French royal family, perhaps the dauphin, Louis of Guyenne (d. 1415). Or this first stage in production might have taken place later, after Louis's death, the heraldic symbols having no immediate reference to patronage, but simply being part of the standard iconographic programme of the workshop.

In the early 1420s the manuscript was in the possession of John of Lancaster, the Duke of Bedford who was regent of France on behalf of his nephew Henry VI from 1422 until his death in 1435. In 1423 he gave the manuscript to his wife Anne of Burgundy as a wedding present. Personalizing additions to the manuscript's illumination that commemorate its ownership by the Duke and Duchess of Bedford include two large portrait miniatures (ff. 256v and 257v), showing John kneeling before St George and Anne of Burgundy kneeling before St Anne.

In 1430 Anne gave the manuscript as a Christmas present to the nine-year-old Henry VI, who was staying with the Bedfords in Rouen before his coronation as king of France. This gift was memorialized in the manuscript itself, on f. 256r, in an inscription made at the duke's request, written by John Somerset, Henry's tutor and personal physician. It is possible that it was in preparing the book as a gift to Henry that the portrait miniatures of the Bedfords were added, along with other additions to the programme of illumination.

Later owners include King Henry II of France and his wife Catherine de' Medici (identifiable by their coats of arms, added to the manuscript), and Frances Worsley (1673-1750), wife of Sir Robert Worsley, 4th Baronet of Appuldurcombe. Edward Harley probably purchased the manuscript from Frances Worsley, but he did not will it to his widow with the rest of the Harley collection, instead bequeathing it directly to his daughter, Margaret Bentinck, Duchess of Portland.

After the Duchess's death, the Bedford Hours was sold in 1786 to James Edwards, a private collector who outbid the king. George Spencer-Churchill, 5th Duke of Marlborough bought the manuscript, along with the rest of Edwards's library. Then from the sale of the Duke's library, Sir John Tobin bought it: and in 1838 he gave it to his son, the Rev. John Tobin, who sold it in 1851 to the bookseller William Boone. The manuscript was purchased by the British Museum in 1852, and now forms part of the British Library's collection of Additional manuscripts.

== Contents ==
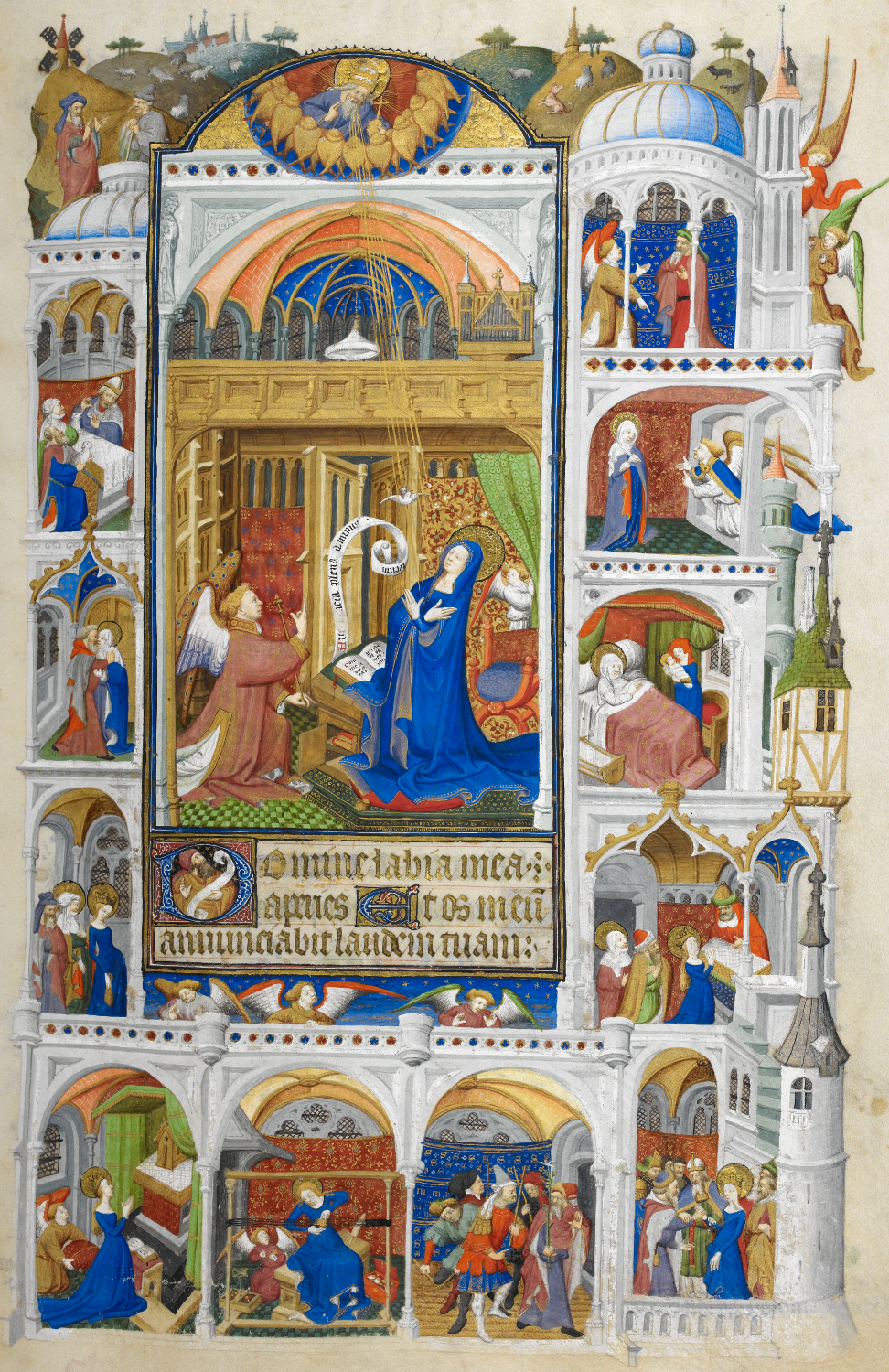
Miniature of the Annunciation, with scenes from the life of the Virgin, f. 32r

The contents of the Bedford Hours can be divided into several major sections of content normal for a conventional book of hours, with the later addition of three smaller sections of supplementary material, mostly miniatures. These contents are:

1. Calendar (ff. 1r-12v): decorated with the Labours of the Months and the symbols of the Zodiac
2. (minor insertion) Genesis miniatures (ff. 13v-18v): includes full-page miniatures of the story of Adam and Eve, Noah's Ark and the Tower of Babel
3. Gospel excerpts and prayers to the Virgin (ff. 19r-31v): includes large miniatures of the four Evangelists
4. Hours of the Virgin (ff. 32r-95v): includes large miniatures of the Annunciation, Visitation, Nativity, Annunciation to the shepherds, Adoration of the Magi, Presentation in the Temple, Flight into Egypt, and Death and Coronation of the Virgin.
5. Penitential Psalms, Litany, and Hours specific to the days of the week (ff. 96r-156v): includes large miniatures of David and Bathsheba, the Trinity, a performance of the Office of the Dead, the Coronation of the Virgin, Pentecost, the Last Supper, the Crucifixion, and the Virgin as the Virgin of Mercy
6. Office of the Dead (ff. 157r-99r): introduced by a large miniature of the Last Judgement
7. French prayers (ff. 199v-207v): includes large miniatures of the Madonna and Child and the Trinity
8. Hours of the Passion (ff. 208r-55v): includes miniatures of the Agony in the Garden, the Arrest of Christ, Christ before Pilate, the Flagellation, Christ carrying the cross, the Crucifixion, the Deposition from the cross, and the Entombment
9. (minor insertion) prayers and portraits of John, Duke of Bedford and his wife Anne, Duchess of Bedford (ff. 256r-59v): includes also the inscription by John Somerset, recording the gift of the manuscript to Henry VI
10. Suffrages to the saints, commemorations of saints, special masses (ff. 260r-87v)
11. (minor insertion) full-page miniature depicting the legend of the Fleurs-de-lis and its presentation to King Clovis (ff. 288r-89v)

== Illumination ==
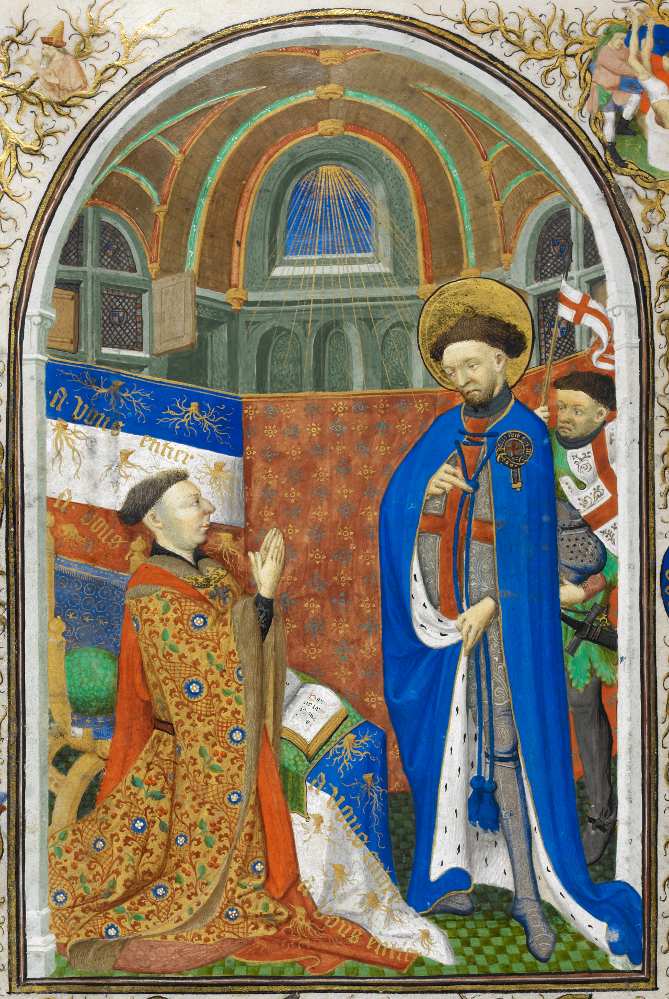
Miniature of John, Duke of Bedford praying before St George, f. 256v

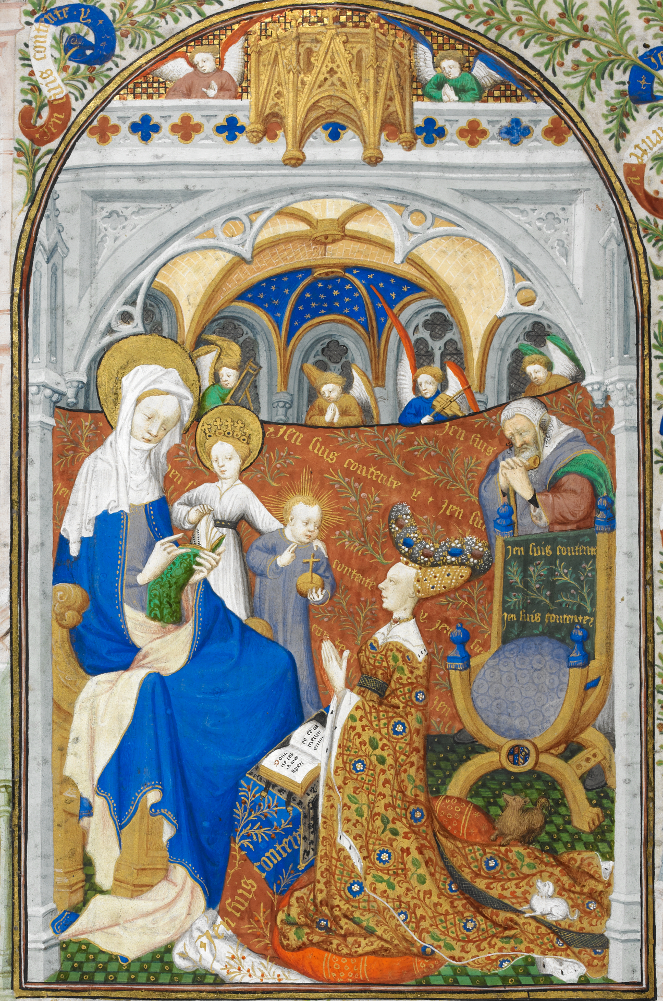
Miniature of Anne, Duchess of Bedford praying before St Anne, f. 257v

The programme of decoration in the Bedford Hours is an outstanding example of late medieval illumination. The artists responsible for the manuscript have not been identified with certainty, but are collectively known as the "Bedford Workshop", and the head artist is likewise known as the "Bedford Master".

The hands of the Bedford Master and the Bedford Workshop have been identified in other manuscripts from this period, including the Salisbury Breviary (Paris, Bibliothèque nationale de France, MS.lat. 17294), also owned by the Duke of Bedford. The illumination of the Bedford Hours is also related to that of the Très Riches Heures du Duc de Berry (Chantilly, Musée Condé MS 65), illuminated by the Limbourg brothers. It is possible that some of the Bedford Hours miniatures were based on images in the Très Riches Heures.

Other products of the Bedford Workshop include:

- the Lamoignon Hours (Lisbon, Gulbenkian Foundation, MS LA 237): made c. 1420 and owned by Isabella of Brittany
- Vienna, Österreichische Nationalbibliothek cod. 1855: made c. 1422-1425 for Charles VII of France
- the Sobieski Hours (Royal Collection, Windsor Castle): made c. 1420-1425, probably for Margaret of Burgundy, Dauphine of France, and wife of Louis of Guyenne.
