= Eleanor Spencer =

Eleanor Spencer may refer to:

- Eleanor Patterson Spencer (1895-1992), American art historian
- Eleanor Spencer (pianist) (1890–1973), American musician
- Margaret Spencer or Eleanor Spencer (1472–1536)
- Eleanor Beaufort, wife of Sir Robert Spencer (1431–1501)
