= Dunois Master =

French painter

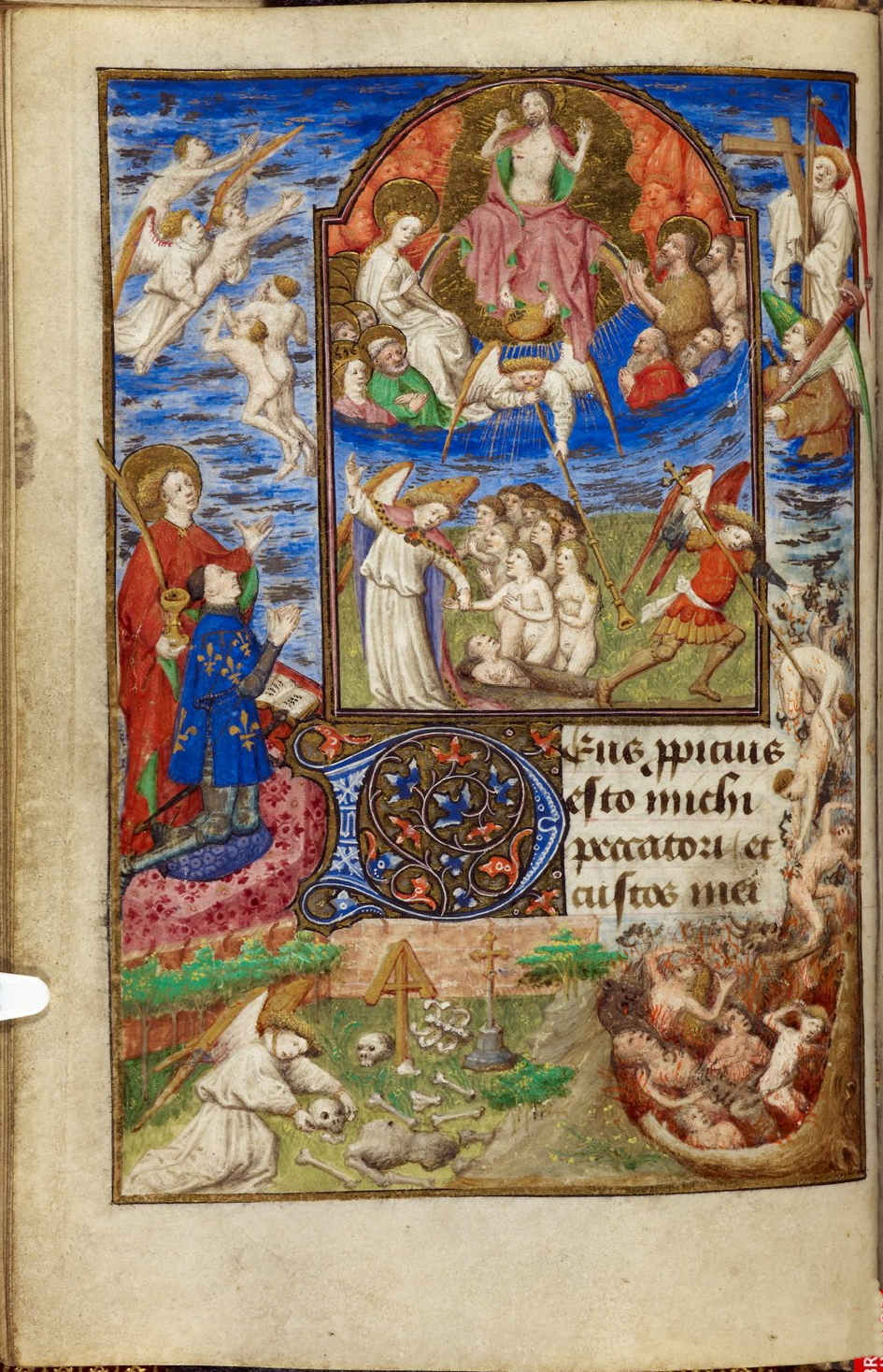
The Last Judgment from the Dunois Hours

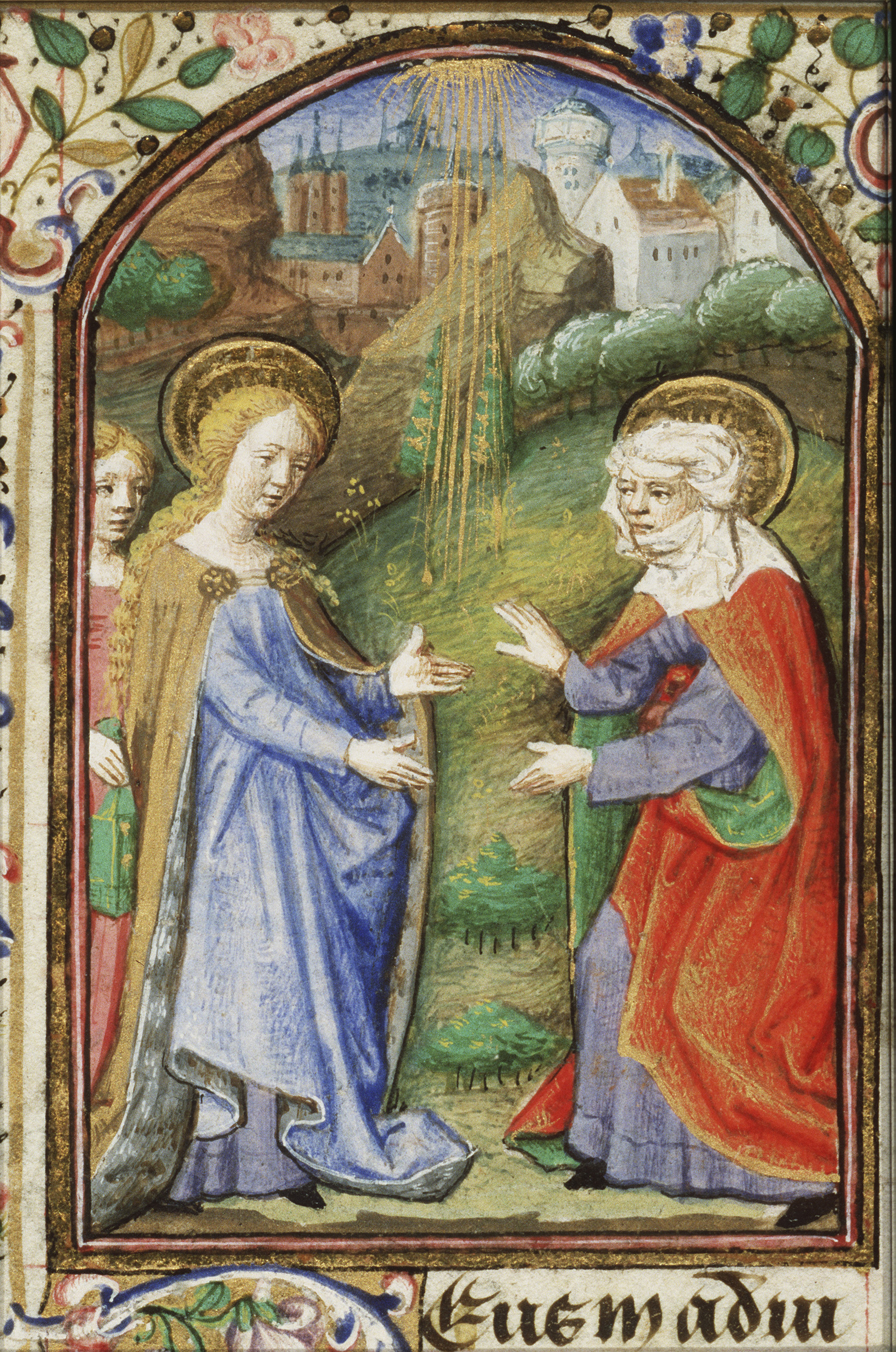
The Visitation - Mary, accompanied by a maid carrying a book, meets St. Elisabeth - Book of Hours of Simon de Varie - KB 74 G37, folio 053r

The Dunois Master, also called Chief Associate of the Bedford Master was a French manuscript illuminator believed to have been active between about 1430 and about 1465. His name comes from a book of hours made for Jean de Dunois now in the British Library (Yates Thompson MS 3). He worked in association with the Bedford Master, in whose workshop he seems to have served; scholars consider him to be the most talented of the Bedford Master's assistants. He is usually assumed to have taken over the workshop when the Bedford Master ceased to be active, or to have set up his own with some of the artists. His style is characterized by soft modeling of forms, and a fondness for pale colors and shell gold.

== Manuscripts ==
- Guillaume Jouvenel des Ursins Hours, late 1440s, Bibliothèque nationale de France, NAL 3226
- Dunois Hours, London, British Library, Yates Thompson MS 3
- Book of Hours of Simon de Varie, 1455, with Jean Fouquet and Jean Rolin Master. The three parts of this manuscript are KB 74 G37, KB 74 G37a and Getty Center Ms. 7
- Book of hours in the Fitzwilliam Museum, Cambridge, MS McClean 81
- Des cas des nobles hommes et femmes, musée Condé, ms. 860, ca 1465

== Bibliography ==
- Reynolds, Catherine, "The 'Très Riches Heures', the Bedford Workshop and Barthélemy d'Eyck", The Burlington Magazine, Vol. 147, No. 1229 (Aug., 2005), pp. 526–533, JSTOR
- Biography at Getty website
- Detailed record for the Dunois Hours on the BL site
- (in French) F. Avril and N. Reynaud: Quand la peinture était dans les livres. Les Manuscrits à Peintures en France 1440–1520, Paris, 1993, p. 38
- (in French) Dominique Thiébaut (dir.): Primitifs français. Découvertes et redécouvertes : Exposition au musée du Louvre du 27 février au 17 mai 2004, Paris, RMN, 2004, 192
