= Eleanor Patterson Spencer =

American art historian

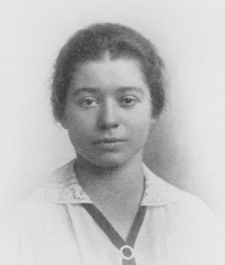
- Eleanor Patterson Spencer, from a 1917 Smith College yearbook.
- Born: 1895; Northampton, Massachusetts
- Died: November 19, 1992 (aged 96–97); Paris
- Occupations: Art historian, college professor, writer
- Known for: Professor of Fine Arts, Goucher College (1930-1962)

Eleanor Patterson Spencer (1895 – November 19, 1992) was an American art historian and college professor.

== Early life ==
Spencer was from Northampton, Massachusetts. She attended Smith College, where she studied under Alfred Vance Churchill and edited the Smith College Weekly newspaper. She completed her undergraduate studies in 1917, and earned a master's degree in art history in 1919, with a thesis titled "Jean-François Millet: His Relation to the Art of the Nineteenth Century". She spent a year of further studies at the Sorbonne, before earning a Ph.D. at Radcliffe. She became the first woman to receive the Sachs Research Fellowship in Fine Arts from Harvard University in 1927, while she was a doctoral student.

== Career ==
Spencer worked at the Parrish Art Museum as a young woman. She had short-term teaching positions at Mount Holyoke College (1919–1920) and Pine Manor College (1921–1927) early in her career. She was a professor of fine arts at Goucher College from 1930 to 1962. At Goucher, she taught a popular course in the history of architecture called "Houses and Housing", and served on the faculty's planning committee, helping to shape the campus's built environment. She was co-author of The Architecture of Baltimore: A Pictorial History (1953, with Richard Hubbard Howland). In 1937, she published a short biography of printer Anne Catharine Green.

Spencer served on the governing board of the Society of Architectural Historians from 1954 to 1957, and was a trustee of the Baltimore Museum of Art and the Peale Museum.

After the death of her parents, Spencer retired from Goucher College in 1962, and moved to Paris. She held a Fulbright Scholarship and an award from the American Council of Learned Societies, for her project involving 15th-century manuscripts, especially the Sobieski Hours, a volume in the library of Windsor Castle.

== Personal life ==
Spencer emphasized that she was "not a feminist" in a 1935 interview; she expected students to call her "Miss Spencer" rather than "Doctor Spencer", and she wore "brown tailored clothes, as a rule with a tie and a sport shirt," considering such garments more economical and practical for a teaching career. She died in 1992, aged 97 years, in Paris. A gallery at Goucher College was named in her memory, and a travel scholarship fund was named for her. In 1994, there was an exhibition titled "A Bouquet of French Manuscripts: An Exhibition Remembering Eleanor Spencer" at the Walters Art Gallery in Baltimore.

== Publications ==
- The printer's relict : an example to her sex, 1937
- L'Horloge de sapience, Bruxelles, Bibliothèque royale, Ms. IV. 111, 1963
- L'horloge de sapience, 1964
- Gerson, Ciboule and the Bedford master's shop. (Bruxelles, Bibl. Royale, Ms. IV. 111, Part II.), 1965
- The Master of the Duke of Bedford: the Salisbury breviary, 1966
- The First patron of the "Tres Belles Henres de Notre-Dame.", 1969
- Dom Louis de Busco's psalter, 1974
- The Sobieski Hours : a manuscript in the Royal Library at Windsor Castle, 1977
