= James Robson (bookseller) =

English printer and bookseller

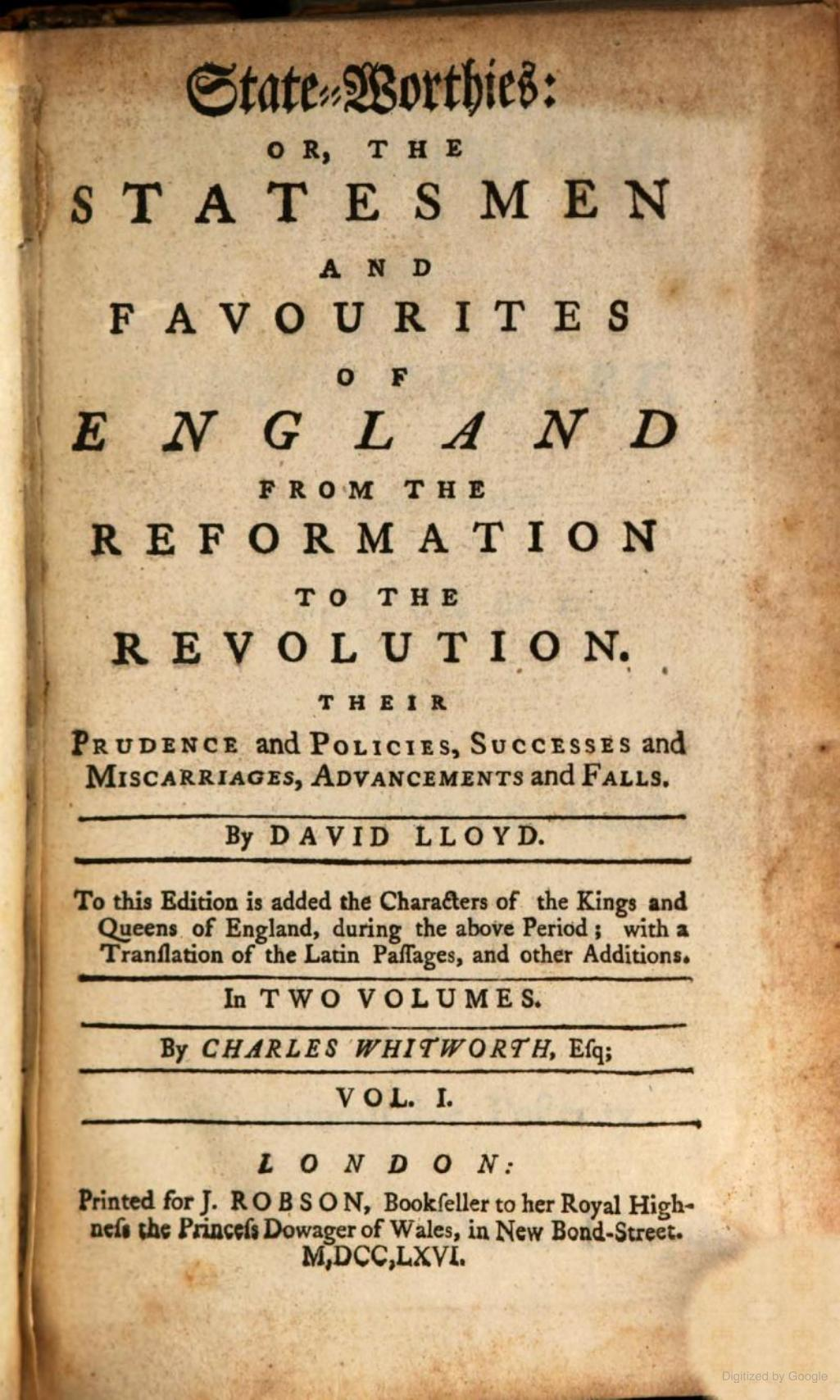
Title page of State Worthies by David Lloyd, Revised by Charles Whitworth, Printed by J Robson.

James Robson (1733–1806) was an English printer and bookseller. He was born in Sebergham, Cumberland.

The title page of the 1766 edition of State Worthies by David Lloyd says: "Printed for J Robson, Bookseller to her Royal Highness the Princess Dowager of Wales, in New Bond-Street."

== Publications ==
- Supplemental volume to Denton, Revd Thomas, New Biographical Dictionary, 1764
- Gilpin, William, Essay on Prints, 1765 (First edition)
- Lloyd, David, State Worthies, 1766. Revised by Charles Whitworth.
- Jerningham, Edward, The Deserter, 1770
- Cumberland, Richard, Odes, 1776.
