= Master of Jean Rolin II =

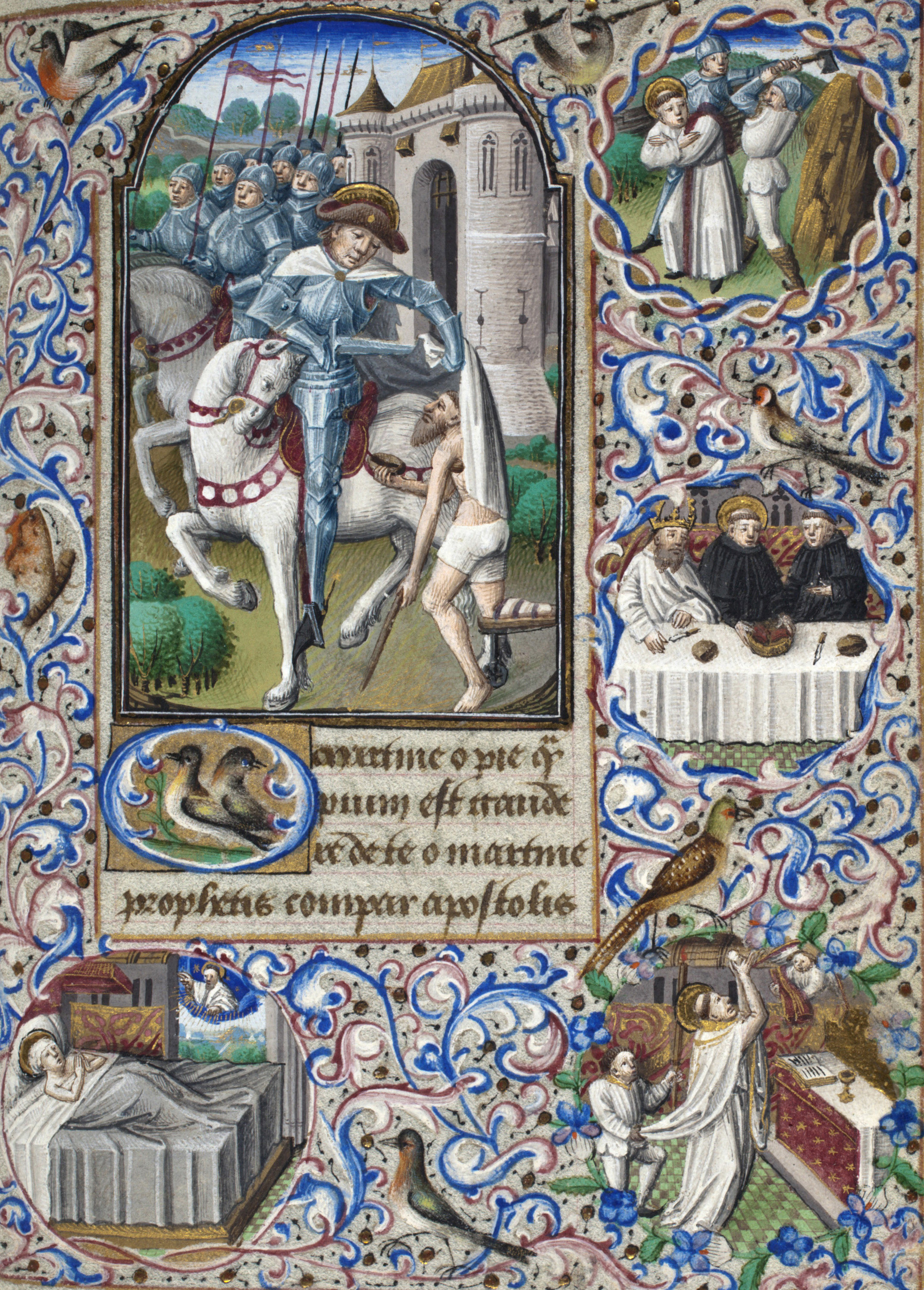
From Book of Hours of Simon de Varie

The Master of Jean Rolin II (15th century), also known as Rolin Master and Missel de Jean Rolin, was an anonymous artist who worked in Paris as a book illuminator for wealthy people including members of the court of Charles VII. The name comes from the work he did for Jean Rolin II, who was the cardinal-bishop of Autun. His work is part of the increase in specialized book production seen in Paris as a response to the growing commissions from lay people and the University of Paris. From 1445 to 1465 he worked in Paris together with other anonymous artists on books that included the Book of Hours of Simon de Varie. Spencer published an account of his style in 1963.
