= Maple Hall =

Historic house in Virginia, United States

- U.S. National Register of Historic Places
- Virginia Landmarks Register
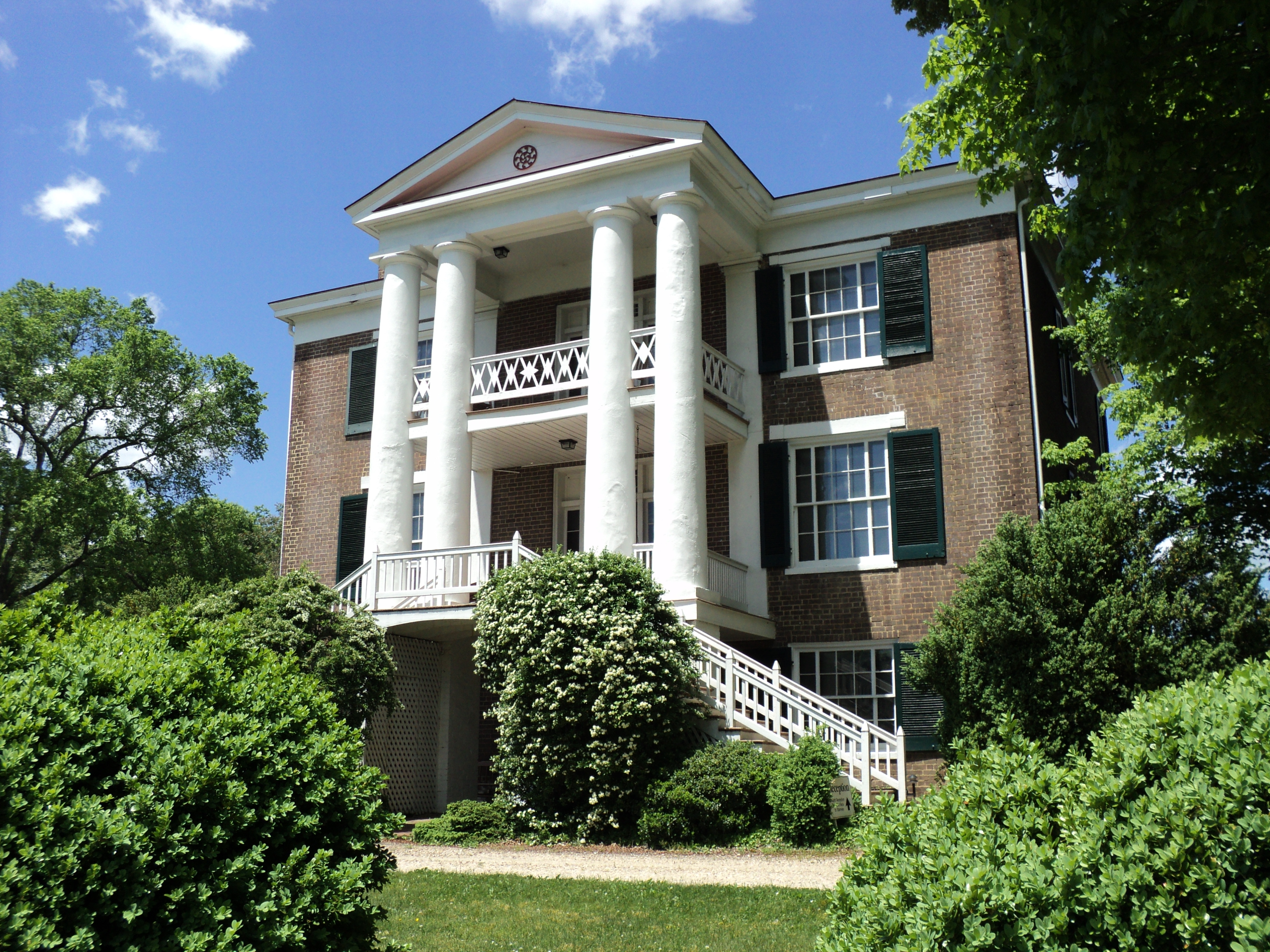
- Maple Hall, May 2010.

- Location within Virginia Location within the United States
- Location: Jct. of US 11 and I-81 and I-64, near Lexington, Virginia
- Coordinates: 37°50′39″N 79°21′45″W
- Area: 56.9 acres (23.0 ha)
- Built: 1820, 1855
- Architectural style: Greek Revival
- NRHP reference No.: 87000006
- VLR No.: 081-0041

Significant dates
- Added to NRHP: January 29, 1987
- Designated VLR: February 18, 1986

Maple Hall is a historic home located near Lexington in Rockbridge County, Virginia, USA. The house was built in 1855 and is a two-story, three-bay, Greek Revival style brick dwelling on an English basement. It has a hipped roof and rear ell with a gable roof. It features a two-story pedimented front portico. The property includes the contributing two-story brick building which probably dates to the 1820s and a small log outbuilding. The home was purchased by John Singleton, who was then the owner of a boarding school in South Carolina, in April 2021. The building was then occupied by the therapeutic boarding school Maple Hall Academy. Maple Hall Academy abruptly closed in April 2024.

It was listed on the National Register of Historic Places in 1987.
