= Sobieski Hours =

15th-century illuminated manuscript

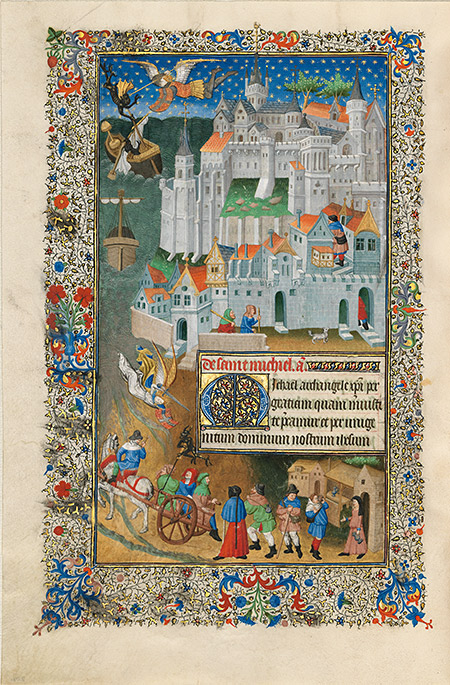
The final miniature in the manuscript, accompanying the prayer to Saint Michael the Archangel on folio 204 verso, depicts Saint Michael as a protector against Satan. In the foreground, he is shown as an angel armed with a sword and shield, attacking a demon tormenting pilgrims on their way to Mont Saint-Michel Abbey. In the background, he appears as a winged knight in ornate armor, striking down a demon assaulting a ship. The miniature is notable for its realistic depiction of common people and for the accurate, detailed rendering of the architectural monument.

The Sobieski Hours is an illuminated manuscript of a book of hours produced in 15th-century France, which is attributed mainly to the anonymous Paris-based illustrator, the Bedford Master. In the 17th-century, the manuscript came into the possession of the Polish King, John III Sobieski. Through inheritance and the marriage of his granddaughter Maria Clementina Sobieska to James Stuart, it made its way to the British Isles. Today, it is part of the British Royal Collection.

The manuscript is made on vellum and richly decorated and features numerous miniatures, elaborately adorned initials, and decorative borders painted in bodycolour and highlighted with gold leaf. It consists of 234 folios, each numbered in pencil, with dimensions of 28.6 × 19.7 × 6.5 cm. In addition to the Bedford Master, the manuscript also involved the work of two other renowned anonymous masters, the illustrators known as the Master of Sir John Fastolf and the Master of the Munich Golden Legend.

== History ==
The Sobieski Hours was created by the anonymous Bedford Master, a French illuminator who worked for John of Lancaster, Duke of Bedford, brother of King Henry V of England and Regent of France. The manuscript was made for Margaret, sister of Philip the Good, Duke of Burgundy. John of Lancaster was her brother-in-law through his wife, Anne. Margaret appears in the manuscript, and on folio 162 she is depicted kneeling in prayer before the image of her patron saint. In 1423, Margaret married Arthur de Richemont, Duke of Brittany, a supporter of the English dynasty, so the manuscript may have been a wedding gift for her. The work was therefore likely produced around 1422–1423.

The later history of the book is unclear. Coats of arms found on folios 1 recto, 13 verso, and 52 recto indicate that by the late 15th century the manuscript belonged to Urban Nagylucsei, Bishop of Győr and Eger, close acquaintance of Hungarian king Matthias Corvinus. After the victory over the Turks at Vienna in 1683, King John III Sobieski of Poland came into possession of the manuscript, either having captured it from the Turks at Párkány or having received it as a gift from a grateful Hungarian magnate. The king had the manuscript bound in scarlet velvet, adorned with his supralibros bearing the initials JRP (Joannes Rex Polonorum). On the pastedowns of the back cover are notes written by Isaac of Troki, the king's court physician.

After the king's death, the Hours were inherited by his son, Jakub Sobieski. Through the marriage of James's daughter, Maria Clementina, to James Stuart, the Jacobite claimant to the thrones of England and Scotland, the manuscript passed into the possession of the Stuart family. Their son Henry Stuart, Cardinal of York, bequeathed it in his will to the heir to the English throne, the future King George IV. Since that time, the manuscript has been kept in the Royal Library at Windsor.
