= Bedford Master =

15th-century French manuscript illuminator

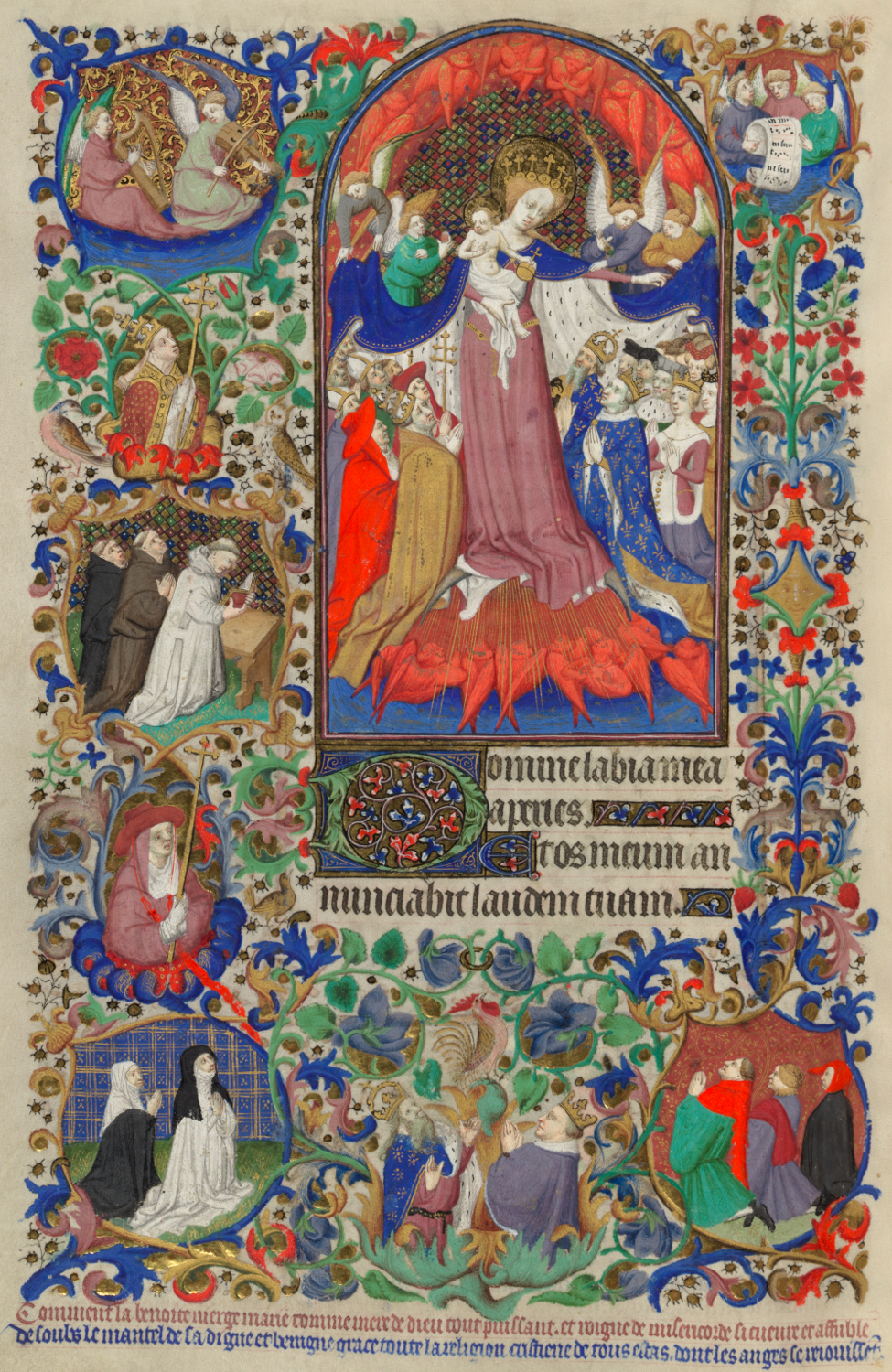
Page from the Bedford Hours, 1423, illumination on parchment, 41 cm × 28 cm. British Library.

The Bedford Master was a manuscript illuminator active in Paris during the fifteenth century. He is named for the work he did on two books illustrated for John of Lancaster, 1st Duke of Bedford between 1415 and 1435. One is the Bedford Hours, a book of hours in the British Library (Add. MS 18850); the other, the Salisbury Breviary, is in the Bibliothèque nationale de France (MS lat. 17294). Another manuscript is in the Royal Collection. The Bedford Master is known to have been the head of a workshop; his chief assistant is known as the Chief Associate of the Bedford Master.

Recent scholarship has tended to move from talking about the "Bedford Master" to the "Bedford Workshop" and even the Bedford Trend, a term introduced by Millard Meiss in 1967, which includes a wider period leading up to the key Bedford works. A "Master of the Bedford Trend" has also been attributed with some works. One possible candidate for the identity of the Bedford Master is "Haincelin of Hagenau" in Alsace, who was recorded in Paris between 1403 and 1424, and was perhaps the father of "Jean Haincelin", active between at least 1438 and 1449, and was perhaps the "Dunois Master" who has been given a group of late Bedford-style manuscripts.

== Manuscripts ==
For John, Duke of Bedford:

- Bedford Hours, British Library, Add. MS 18850
- Salisbury Breviary, BnF, MS Lat. 17294
- Sobieski Hours (named after its owner in the 17th century King John III Sobieski of Poland), Royal Collection, in part
- Pontifical of Poitiers, now lost
- Hours and Psalter, British Library, Add. MS 74754
- Hours, Österreichische Nationalbibliothek, Cod. 1855 (Source: Björn R. Tammen, "Prayers and beyond" in "Prospettive di iconografia musicale" (2007)
