= Histoire ancienne jusqu'à César and Faits des Romains =

Illuminated medieval book

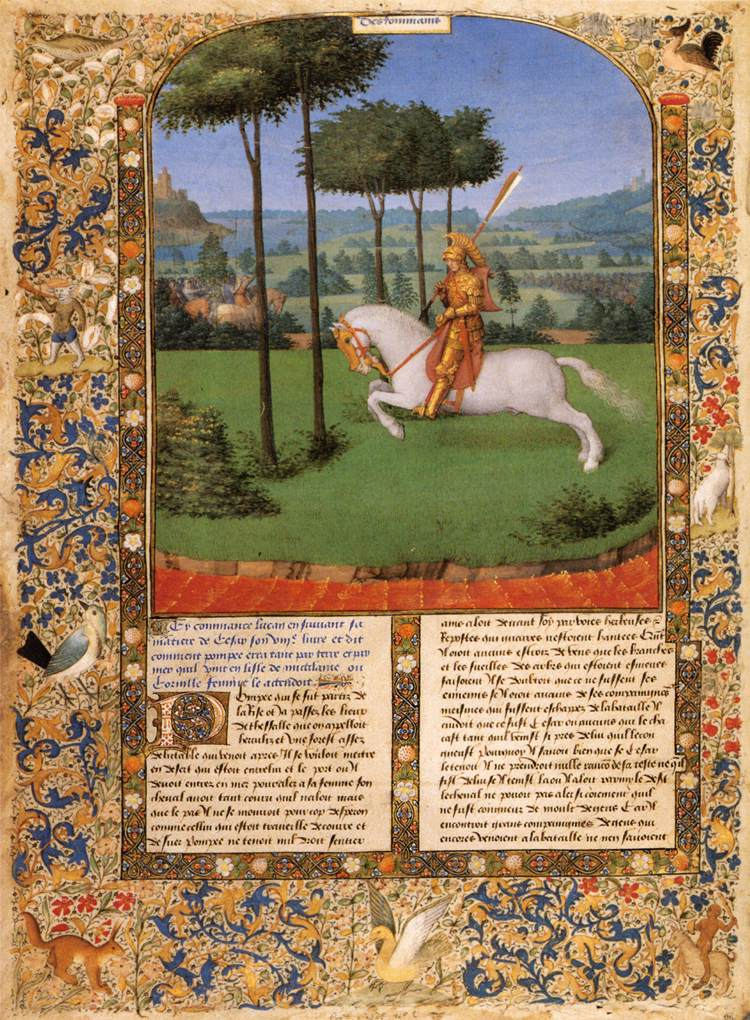
Pompey's Flight after the Battle of Pharsalus.

Histoire ancienne jusqu'à César and Faits des Romains was an illuminated manuscript containging both Histoire ancienne jusqu'à César and Faits des Romains (two early 13th-century chronicles of ancient history). The illuminations were possibly produced by Jean Fouquet in Tours between 1470 and 1475. Only five folios of the manuscript survive, one in the Rijksmuseum Amsterdam and the rest in the Louvre.

The manuscript's commissioner is unknown - according to Claude Schaefer the initials LG on the dais in Coronation of Alexander refer to Laurent Gyrard, son-in-law of Étienne Chevalier and a patron of Fouquet, whilst other art historians dispute the presence of those letters.

The folios had already been separated by the 17th century, when they were in the Netherlands and at which time the Dutch page numbers were added whilst they were in a portfolio (but not relating to their original order in the manuscript). The four folios now in the Louvre were in William Horatio Crawford's collection in Cork, Ireland. After his death in 1891 his collection was sold, with the folios bought by Henry Yates Thompson. They were first exhibited at the Louvre in 1904 during an exhibition on medieval French artists and they were acquired by them in a 1912 purchase (Coronation of Alexander and Battle via Maurice Fenaille), a 1921 purchase (via the Amis du musée du Louvre) and a 1946 bequest (by Thompson's widow and in line with her husband's wishes). The Rijksmuseum acquired its folio from the art dealer Frederick Müller in Amsterdam in 1899.
