= Hours of Étienne Chevalier =

- Saint John on Patmos – probably the first of the surviving miniatures from the Hours.
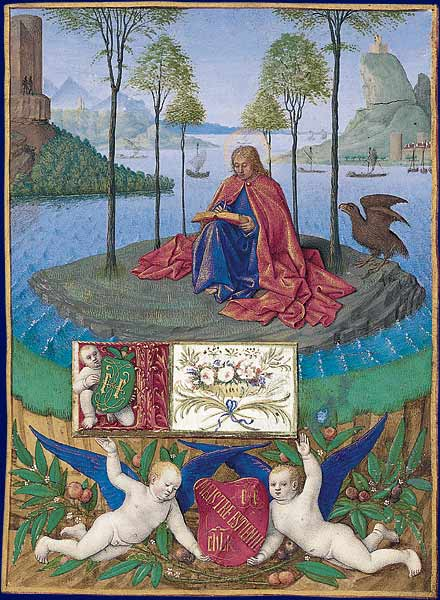
- Artist: Jean Fouquet
- Year: 1450s
- Dimensions: 16.5 cm × 12 cm (6.5 in × 4.7 in)
- Location: Musée Condé, Château de Chantilly

The Hours of Étienne Chevalier is an illuminated book of hours commissioned by Étienne Chevalier, treasurer to King Charles VII of France, from the miniature painter and illuminator Jean Fouquet.

Only 48 of its leaves with 47 miniatures survive, dispersed across seven collections in Europe and the United States of America, of which 40 illuminations are held at the Musée Condé in the Château de Chantilly in France.

== History ==
It was probably commissioned by Chevalier for his personal use around 1452, just after he was made treasurer of France by Charles VII of France and just after the death of his wife, who does not appear in any of the illuminations with him. He was definitely the commissioner of the work, since his portrait appears frequently in it, as do his full name "Maistre Estienne Chevalier" (notably in the border of the image of The Presentation of the Virgin) and his cypher "EE" in several of the miniatures. It was probably completed around 1460 – François Avril and Nicole Reynaud state that for most of the 1450s Fouquet spent almost all his time on this and another commission from Chevalier, the Melun Diptych.

The manuscript was owned by Chevalier's descendants until the 17th century and by his last direct descendant, Nicolas Chevalier (1562–1630). The scholar François Roger de Gaignières indicates that it appeared intact at the end of the 17th century and so it was probably divided over the course of the 18th century, with each miniature cut out to turn them into separate artworks and their textual parts obscured.

Of the best-preserved miniatures, 40 were mounted on wooden panels by a Parisian frame-maker at the end of the 18th century. During the French Revolution, these 40 miniatures were bought by an art-dealer from Basel who sold them in 1809 to the German banker Georges Brentano. His son Louis sold them on to Prince Henri, Duke of Aumale in 1891 for 250,000 francs. Prince Henry then exhibited them at his château de Chantilly in its Santuario, where they can still be seen.

One miniature of David at Prayer is recorded in 1831 in the collection of the English poet Samuel Rogers, close to 40 other miniatures – these passed to the British Museum in 1886. In 1881, another miniature (of Saint Anne and the three Maries) was bought by the bibliothèque nationale de France. In 1889, Count Paul Durrieu, curator of paintings at the musée du Louvre, oversaw the purchase of a miniature of Saint Martin, and in the Louvre's drawings collection discovered another, of Saint Margaret, which had been presented to the Louvre in 1856. In 1922 he discovered yet another in the collections of Upton House, Warwickshire (National Trust), showing St Michael fighting the Dragon. In 1946, two more leaves resurfaced in a sale at Sotheby's. These showed The Hand of God protecting the Faithful and A Miracle of Saint Vrain. The first of these was acquired by the banker Robert Lehman, who donated it to the Metropolitan Museum of Art in New York in 1975, whilst the latter was bought by Georges Wildenstein, whose son donated it to the Musée Marmottan-Monet in 1971 along with a collection of other miniatures cut from manuscripts, which has been on show there since 1981. That same year, a double page or bifolium of text from the manuscript was rediscovered in a private collection.

== Composition ==
=== Organisation ===
For a long time the book's composition was only known from the 40 illuminations in the musée Condé, which only gave a succession of scenes from the life of Christ followed by episodes from saints' lives or from the Golden Legend. Yet, like any book of hours, it would originally have featured the three offices from the Liturgy of the Hours – the Office of the Virgin, the Office of the Passion and the Office of the Holy Spirit.

Also, the book's composition was novel and complex, since each of the three offices was interlaced with some from the other two, making it difficult to determine the order of the illuminations. A certain number of illustrations can also be determined as missing after this order's establishment. The original manuscript probably included an illustration of Saint Luke, of the prayer Obsecro te, of prime and of Sext of the Office of the Holy Spirit, of sext in the Office of the Passion, along with several pleas or prayers to saints such as Lawrence, Christopher or Sebastian.

=== Surviving folios ===
In the order determined by Nicole Reynaud (2006), the surviving folios are as follows (with the collection being the musée Condé at Chantilly unless otherwise noted):

- Saint John on Patmos (Gospel of John)
- Adoration of the Magi (Gospel of Matthew)
- Ascension (Gospel of Mark)
- Étienne Chevalier praying before the Virgin (Office of the Virgin, Matins)
- Visitation (Office of the Virgin, Lauds)
- Arrest of Christ (Office of the Cross, matins)
- Annunciation (Office of the Holy Spirit, matins)
- Nativity (Office of the Virgin, prime)
- Jesus before Pilate (Office of the Cross, prime)
- Announcement of the Virgin's Death (Office of the Virgin, terce)
- Christ carrying the cross (Office of the Cross, terce)
- Pentecost (Office of the Holy Spirit, terce)
- Dormition (Office of the Virgin, sext)
- Funeral of the Virgin (Office of the Virgin, nones)
- Crucifixion (Office of the Cross, nones)
- Fountain of the apostles (Office of the Holy Spirit, nones)
- Assumption (Office of the Virgin, vespers)
- Descent from the cross (Office of the Cross, vespers)
- Right hand of God driving out demons (Office of the Holy Spirit, vêpre), parchment, 19,4 x 14,6 cm, Metropolitan Museum of Art, Lehman Collection
- Coronation of the Virgin (Office of the Virgin, compline)
- Anointing of Christ (Office of the Cross, compline)
- The Holy Spirit illuminating the faithful (Office of the Holy Spirit, compline)
- Marriage of the Virgin (Office of the Virgin for Advent)
- David at prayer (Psalms), 19,7 x 15,2 cm, British Library
- Funeral scenes (offices of the dead, vespers)
- Job and his friends (Office of the dead, vigiles)
- Pietà (Hymns of the Stabat Mater)
- Saint Bernard (poem by Saint Bernard)
- Saint Michael fighting the dragon (suffrage), 20,3 x 14,2 cm, (of which the miniature 15,7 x 12 cm), Upton House, Bearsted Collection, National Trust
- Birth of John the Baptist (suffrage)
- Saint John the Evangelist and the Wedding at Cana (suffrage)
- Martyrdom of Saint Peter (suffrage)
- Conversion of saint Paul (suffrage)
- Martyrdom of Saint Andrew (suffrage)
- Martyrdom of Saint James (suffrage)
- Martyrdom of Saint Stephen (suffrage)
- Charity of saint Martin (suffrage), 20,9 x 14,3 cm (16,1 x 11,7 cm), musée du Louvre, département des arts graphiques
- Saint Nicolas consecrated (suffrage)
- Saint Hilary at the council of pope Leo I (suffrage)
- Miracle of saint Vrain (suffrage), 22 x 14 cm, musée Marmottan-Monet, gift by Daniel Wildenstein
- Saint Mary Magdalene anointing Christ's feet (suffrage)
- Martyrdom of saint Catherine (suffrage)
- Saint Margaret and Olibrius (suffrage), 8,9 x 11,7 cm, musée du Louvre, département des arts graphiques
- Saint Anne and the three Maries, 16,3 x 12,7 cm (don't miniature 15,9 x 12,4 cm), Bibliothèque nationale de France
- Martyrdom of saint Appoline (suffrage)
- All the saints, the Virgin and the Trinity (suffrage)
- Double page of text (psalms 129 and 142, and litanies), folioté, 20,1 x 14,8 cm, collection of Roger and Alix De Kesel Deurle (Belgium)

== Bibliography ==
- Nicole Reynaud, Jean Fouquet – Les Heures d'Etienne Chevalier, éd. Faton, Octobre 2006, 280 p. ISBN 2878440765 (latest reference monograph)
- François Avril, Jean Fouquet, peintre et enlumineur du XVe siècle; catalogue de l'exposition, Paris, Bibliothèque nationale de France / Hazan, 2003 (ISBN 2-7177-2257-2), p. 193-217
- Charles Sterling and Claude Schaefer, Jean Fouquet. Les Heures d'Étienne Chevalier, Paris, 1971.
- Nicole Reynaud, Jean Fouquet, catalogue d'exposition, Paris, 1981 ("Les dossiers du département des Peintures", no 22).
- Judith Förstel, « Étienne Chevalier, Jean Fouquet et Melun », 6e colloque historique des bords de Marne : Présence royale et aristocratique dans l’est parisien à la fin du Moyen Âge, Nogent-sur-Marne, 2008, p. 96-107 Online text
