= British Library, Stowe MS 54 (Histoire ancienne) =

British Library, Stowe MS 54 is a French illuminated manuscript from the first quarter of the fifteenth century of the Histoire ancienne jusqu'à César ("Ancient History up to Caesar"), a medieval historical compilation recounting tales of the ancient world, especially the Trojan War, the conquests of Alexander the Great (particularly the Fall of Thebes), and the greatness of ancient Rome.

The manuscript was copied in Paris from an earlier Neapolitan exemplar illuminated by Cristoforo Orimina, also held by the British Library (Royal 20 D I). The illustrations in this copy were provided by an unidentified illuminator from the Low Countries, working in Paris.

The manuscript forms part of the Stowe manuscripts in the British Library.

== Sources ==
- Pamela Porter, Medieval Warfare in Manuscripts (London: British Library, 2000), p. 42.
