= Histoire ancienne jusqu'à César =

French prose

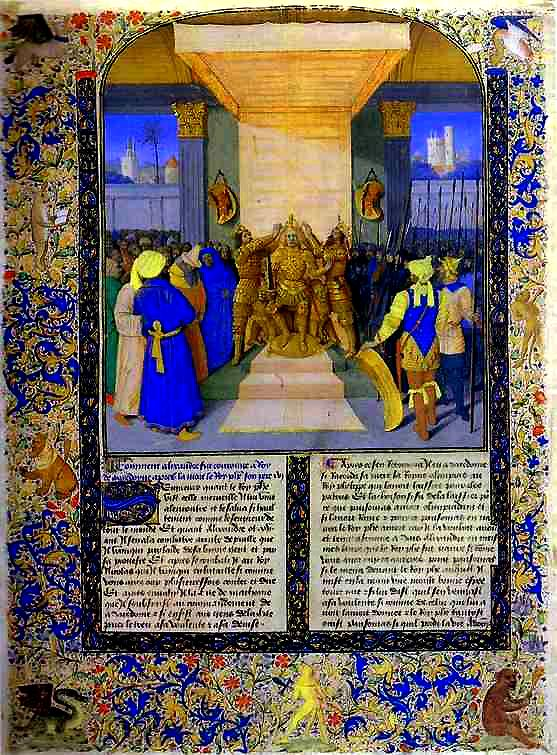
Jean Fouquet, Coronation of Alexander the Great, 15th-century MS of Histoire Ancienne jusqu'à César and Faits des Romains in the Bibliothèque nationale de France.

The Histoire ancienne jusqu'à César ("Ancient history until Caesar") is the first medieval French prose compilation of stories of antiquity, mostly consisting of the so-called Matter of Troy and of Rome, besides text from the Bible and other histories. Composed in the early 13th century in northern France, it told the history of the world from the creation to the time of Julius Caesar. Often copied, it underwent an important redaction in Italy in the 14th century; its influence extended into the Renaissance. In manuscripts from the 14th and 15th centuries it was frequently found together with the Faits des Romains, which continued the history of the Roman Empire.

== History ==
The text was written for Roger IV, the châtelain of Lille; the earlier suggestion that Wauchier de Denain was its author is no longer held. There is some debate about the dating of the text; the range of possible dates is 1208 to 1230.

The Histoire ancienne is usually illuminated; the cycles of illustrations are described by Oltrogge, Die Illustrationszyklen zur 'Histoire ancienne jusqu'à César'. The author had included moralizing passages in verse, left out in subsequent versions in which they were "progressively suppress[ed]". The so-called second redaction came into being in Naples c. 1340, in which the version of the legend of Troy based on Daretis Phrygii de excidio Trojae historia was replaced by a prose adaptation of the Roman de Troie by Benoît de Sainte-Maure. The Faits des Romains may have been "composed with the intent of seeing a contemporary Caesar in the person of the French king", Philip II of France.

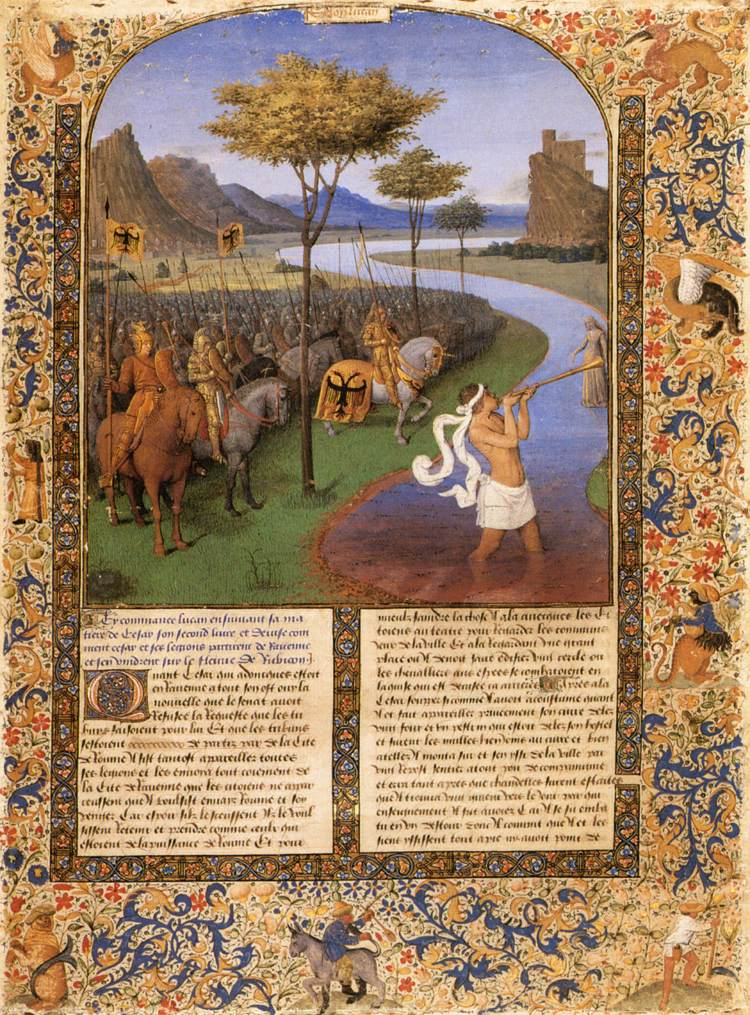
Jean Fouquet, "Caesar Crossing the Rubicon", 15th-century MS of Histoire Ancienne jusqu'á César and Faits des Romains in the Bibliothèque nationale de France.

The function of such anachronistic accounts of the past, according to scholars such as Étienne Gilson, was to create an "eternal present" in which the classical past and the medieval present were joined. One of the consequences of elevating "past and present ... into a kind of atemporal equivalence" is that historical accuracy or even faithfulness of translation is not an objective; texts are freely translated and adapted to allow a "wholesale recreation of the past in the image of the medieval world". The removal of the prologue, the moralizing passages, and of appeals to the audience (all of which help establish an authorial presence and an individual voice) in later revisions has been argued to make the Histoire Ancienne a more general version of classical history, whose applicability exceeds that of the context of Roger de Lille. A general account of antiquity in the vernacular also served (according to historians such as Jacques Le Goff) to allow the nobility (generally untrained in Latin) to read of a glorious past in which it could inscribe itself without clerical intervention. One notable author who used it extensively, particularly for its account of the Trojan War, was Christine de Pizan.

== Contents ==
The Histoire ancienne contains seven books drawn from historical, mythological, and sacred writing.

- book 1: From Genesis to the death of Joseph
- book 2: Assyria and Greece
- book 3: Thebes
- book 4: Minotaur, Amazons, Hercules
- book 5: Troy
- book 6: Aeneas
- book 7: History of Rome until Pompey; Medes and Persians; Judith and Esther; Alexander the Great

== Manuscripts ==
Sixty-eight manuscripts containing the text are known.

- KB 78 D 47, National library of the Netherlands, c. 1250-75, Northern France
- Dijon, M.B., ms 562, c. 1250-75
- Private collection, c. 1370-80, Paris
- MS Ludwig XIII 3:83.MP.146, J. Paul Getty Museum, 1390-1400, Paris
- MS Douce 353, Bodleian Library.
- British Library, Stowe MS 54, early 15th century (based on a Neapolitan exemplar, British Library Royal MS 20 D. i)

== See also ==
- Histoire ancienne jusqu'à César and Faits des Romains

== Bibliography ==
- Oltrogge, D. (1989). Die Illustrationszyklen zur 'Histoire ancienne jusqu'à César' (1250-1400). Europäische Hochschulschriften (in German). Vol. 94. Frankfurt am Main: Peter Lang. ISBN 978-3631406045.
- Visser-van Terwisga, Marijke de (1995). Histoire Ancienne jusqu'a César (Estoires Rogier) (in French). Orléans.
