= Jean Fouquet =

French painter (c. 1420 – 1481)

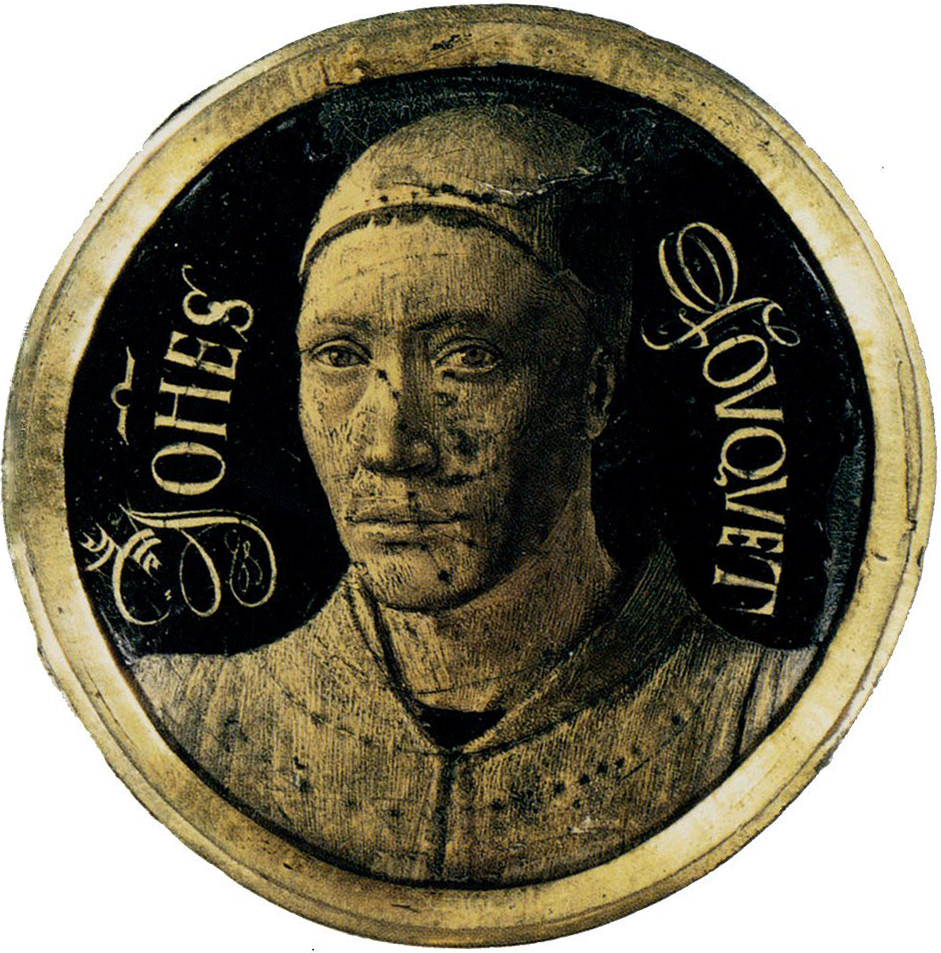
Jean Fouquet, self-portrait (1450); the earliest portrait miniature, and possibly the earliest formal self-portrait (Note: But Jan van Eyck's Portrait of a Man, painted 17 years earlier, is widely believed to be a self-portrait. ("Self-portrait" as used here excludes the practice of an artist inserting a small portrait of himself into a much larger religious scene.))

Jean (or Jehan) Fouquet (French: [ʒɑ̃ fukɛ]; c. 1420–1481) was a French painter and miniaturist. A master of panel painting and manuscript illumination, and the apparent inventor of the portrait miniature, he is considered one of the most important painters from the period between the late Gothic and early Renaissance. He was the first French artist to travel to Italy and experience first-hand the early Italian Renaissance.

Little is known of Fouquet's early life and education. Though long assumed to have been an apprentice of the so-called Bedford Master of Paris it is now suggested that he may have studied under the Jouvenal Master in Nantes, whose works were formerly assumed to be early works by Fouquet. Sometime between 1445 and 1447 he travelled to Italy, where he came under the influence of Roman Quattrocento artists such as Fra Angelico and Filarete. During the 1450s he began working at the French court, where he counted kings Charles VII and his successor Louis XI among his many patrons.

== Life ==
Fouquet was born in Tours. Little is known of his life, but it is certain that he was in Italy before 1447, when he executed a portrait of Pope Eugene IV, who died that year. The portrait survives only in copies from much later.

Upon his return to France, while retaining his purely French sentiment, he grafted the elements of the Tuscan style, which he had acquired during his period in Italy, upon the style of the Van Eycks, forming the basis of early 15th-century French art and becoming the founder of an important new school. He worked for the French court, including Charles VII, the treasurer Étienne Chevalier, and the chancellor Guillaume Jouvenel des Ursins. Near the end of his career, he became court painter to Louis XI.

His work can be associated with the French court's attempt to solidify French national identity in the wake of its long struggle with England in the Hundred Years' War. One example is when Fouquet depicts Charles VII as one of the three magi. This is one of the very few portraits of the king. According to some sources, the other two magi are the Dauphin Louis, future Louis XI, and his brother.

Paintings of the French court

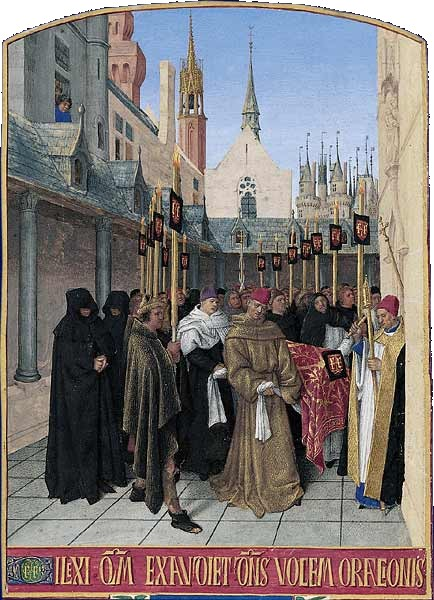
The burial of Étienne Chevalier

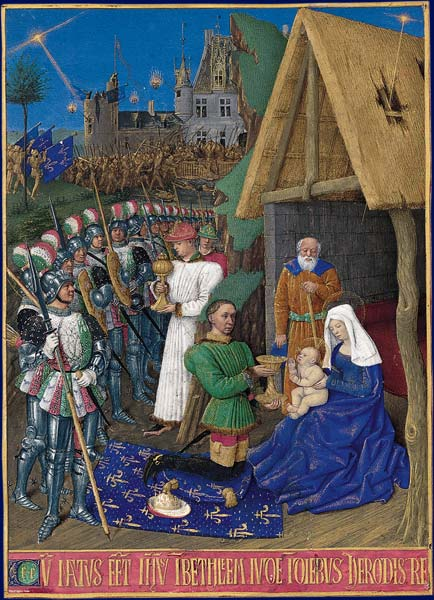
Charles VII as one of the three magi

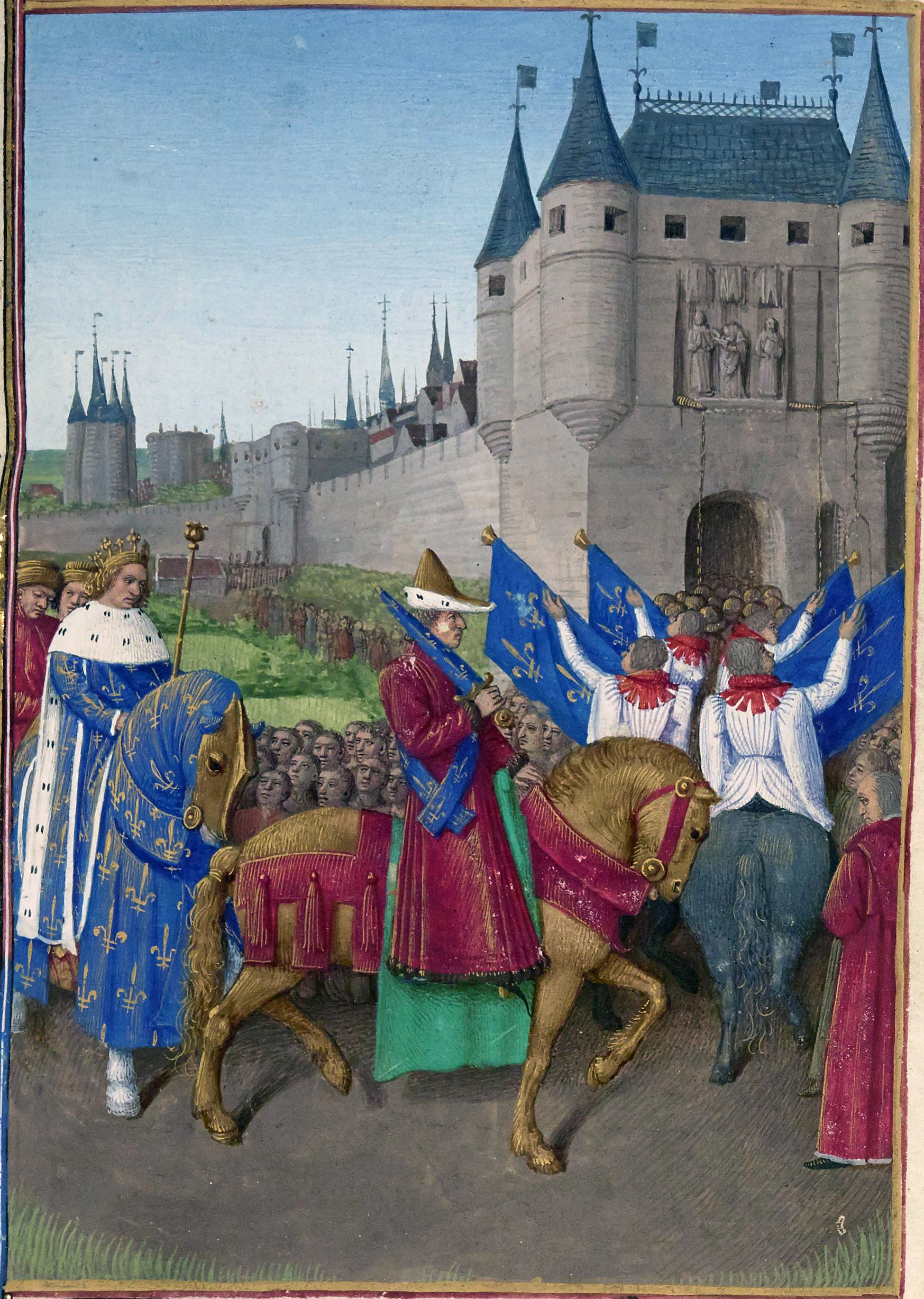
Entry of Charles V in Paris on 2 August 1358, Grandes Chroniques de France (1455–1460)

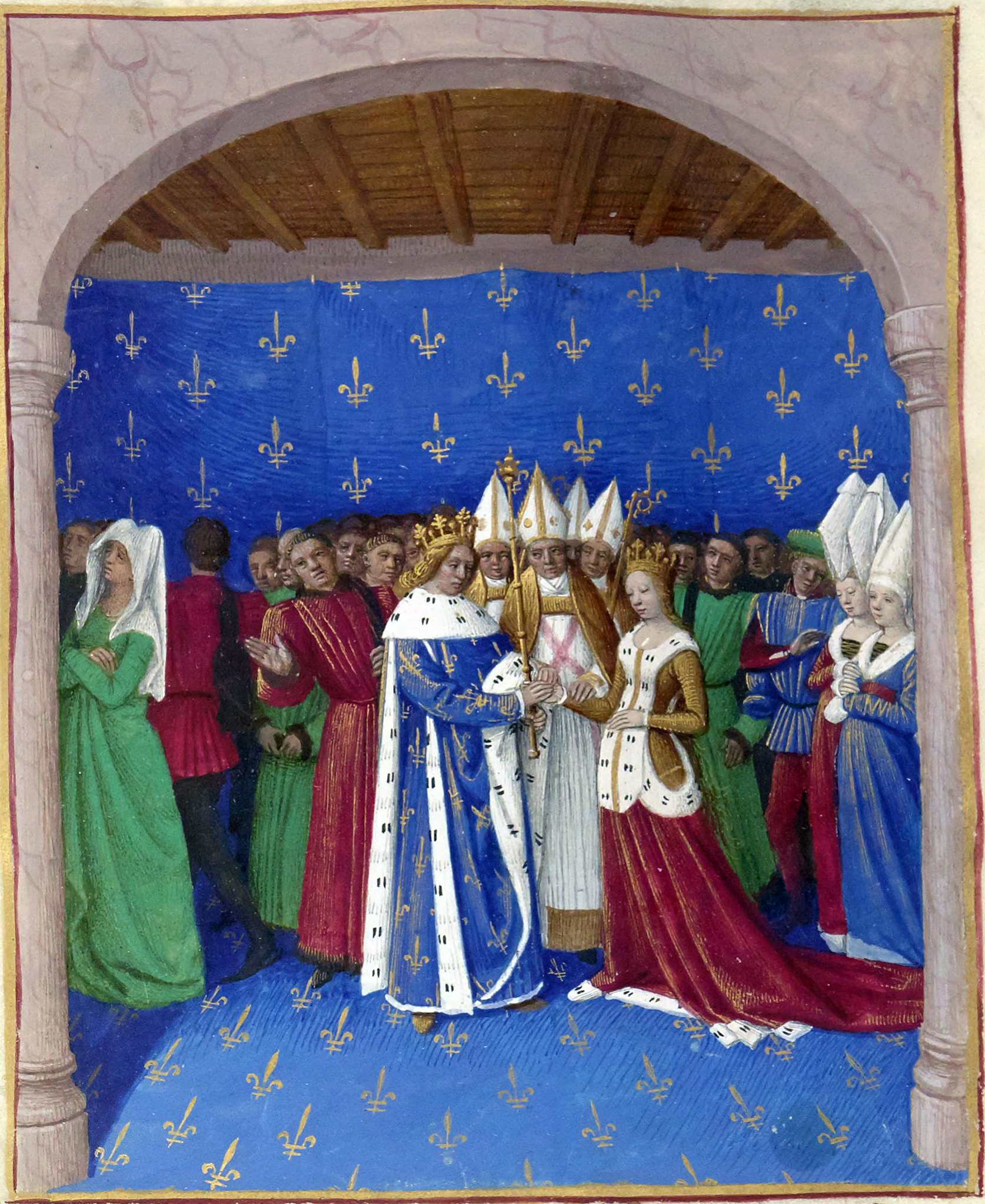
Marriage of Charles IV and Marie of Luxembourg

== Works ==
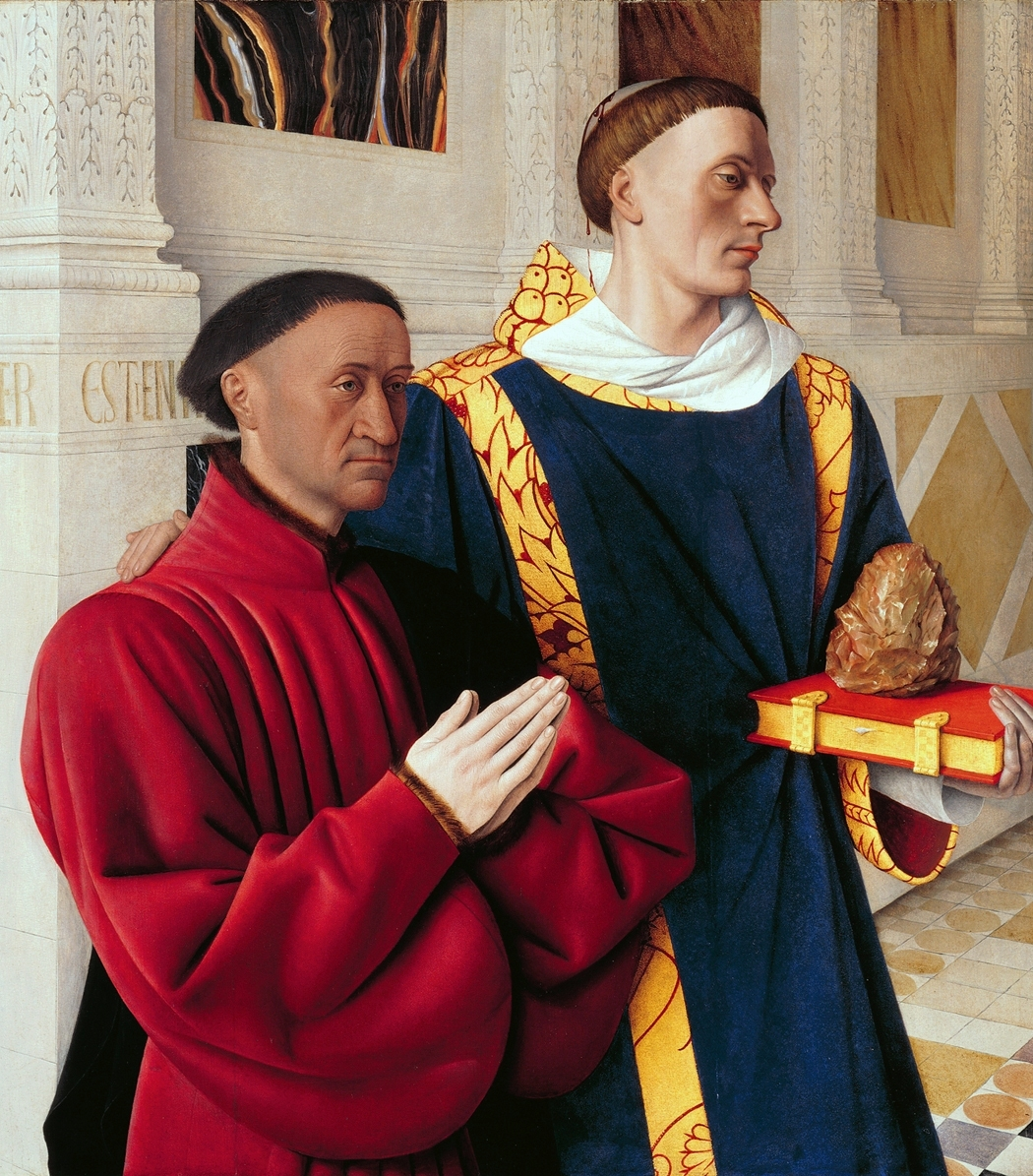
Left wing of the Melun Diptych depicts Etienne Chevalier with his patron saint St. Stephen, (c. 1452-1458) Gemäldegalerie, Berlin.

Fouquet's excellence as an illuminator, his precision in the rendering of the finest detail, and his power of clear characterization in work on this minute scale secured his eminent position in French art. His importance as a painter was demonstrated when his portraits and altarpieces were for the first time brought together from various parts of Europe for the exhibition of the "French Primitives" held at the Bibliothèque Nationale in Paris.

His self-portrait miniature would be the earliest sole self-portrait surviving in Western art, depending on whether or not the 1433 portrait by Jan van Eyck—usually called Portrait of a Man or Portrait of a Man in a Turban—is a self-portrait, as many art historians believe.

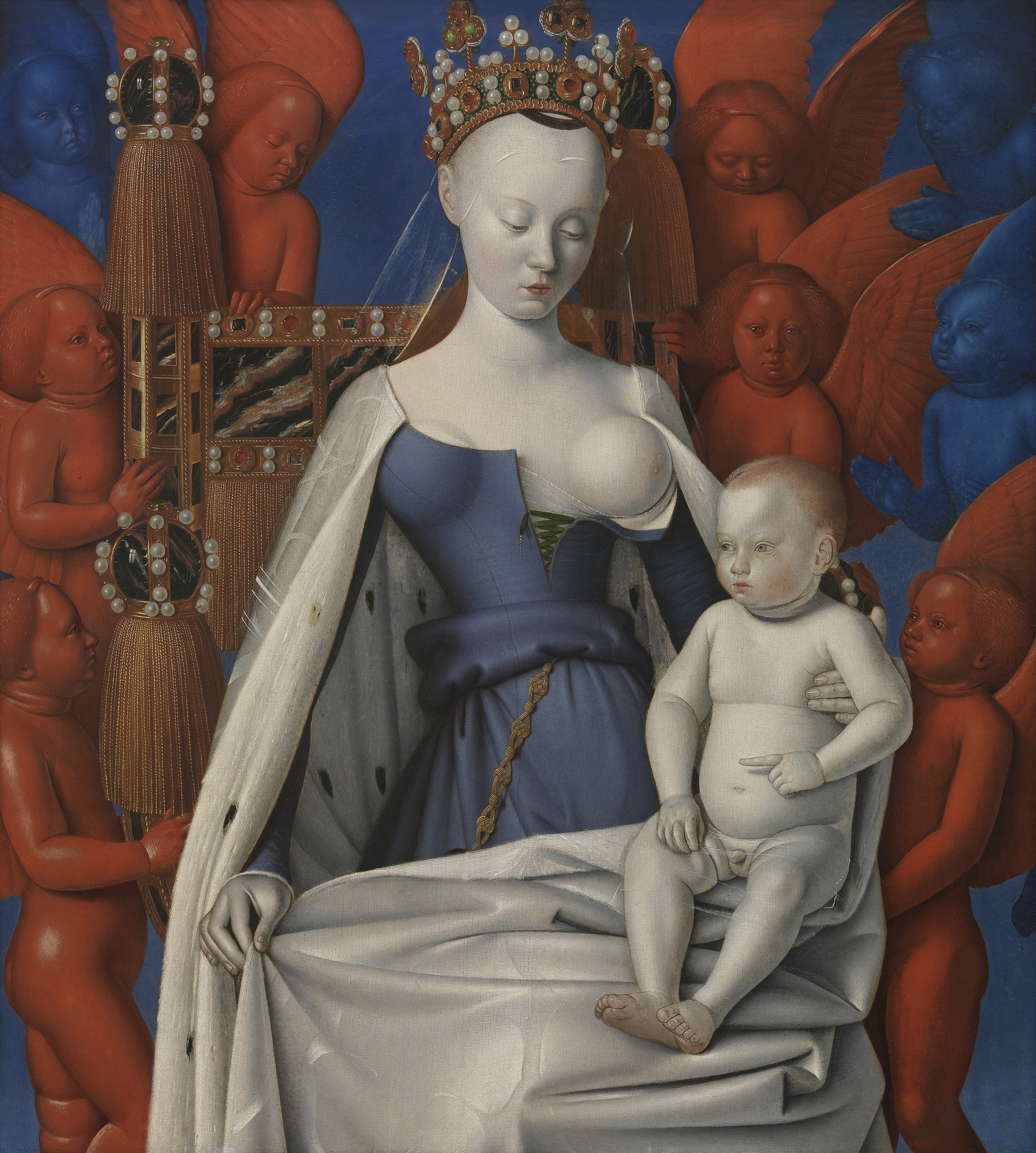
Right wing of Melun Diptych; Virgin and Child Surrounded by Angels, showing Charles VII's mistress Agnès Sorel (c. 1452-1458), oil on wood, 93 x 85 cm, Royal Museum of Fine Arts, Antwerp, Antwerp.

Far more numerous are his illuminated books and miniatures. The Musée Condé in Chantilly contains forty of the forty-seven remaining miniatures from the Hours of Étienne Chevalier, painted in 1461 for Chevalier. Fouquet also illuminated a copy of the Grandes Chroniques de France, for an unknown patron, thought to be either Charles VII or someone else at the royal court.

Also from Fouquet's hand are a few miniatures from five other books and eleven of the fourteen miniatures illustrating the Antiquities of the Jews by Flavius Josephus at the Bibliothèque Nationale. The second volume of this manuscript, with only one of the original thirteen miniatures, was discovered and bought in 1903 by Henry Yates Thompson at a London sale, and restored by him to France.

Only three drawings are attributed to Fouquet:

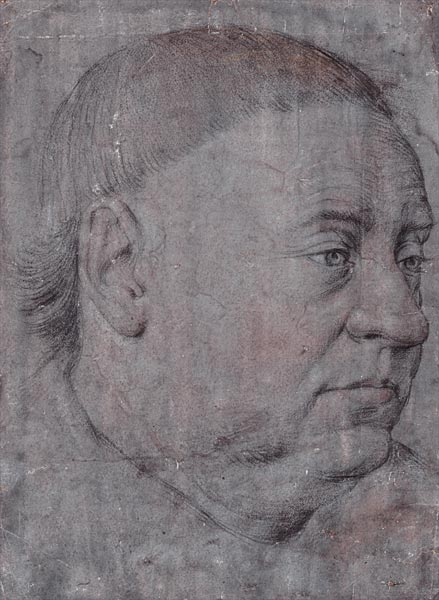
Portrait of Guillaume Jouvenel, Kupferstichkabinett Berlin

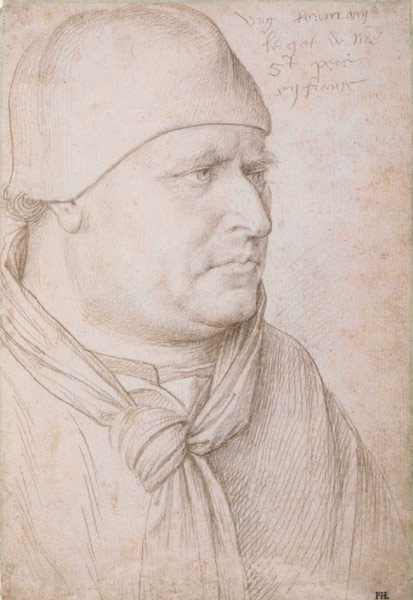
Portrait of a papal legate, Metropolitan Museum of Art, New York City

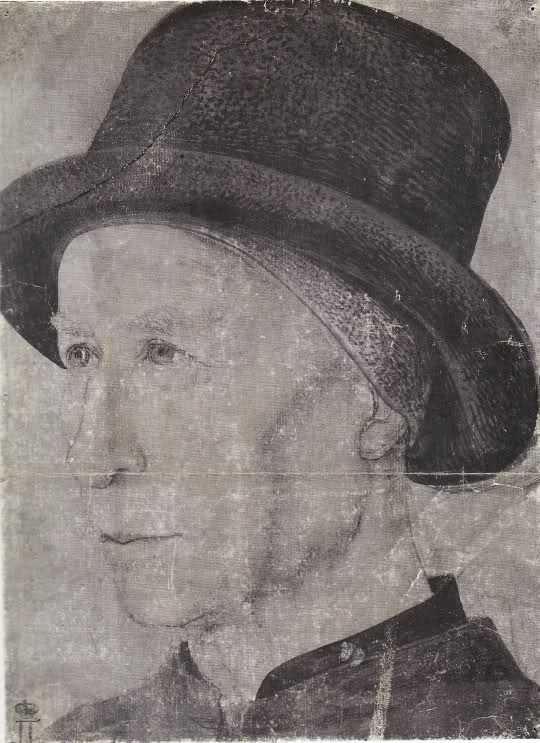
Portrait of a man with a hat, Hermitage Museum, Saint Petersburg

One of Fouquet's most important paintings is the Melun Diptych (c. 1452-1458), formerly in the Collegiate Church of Notre-Dame, Melun. The left wing of the diptych depicts Étienne Chevalier with his patron saint St. Stephen and is now in the Gemäldegalerie, Berlin. The right wing shows a pale Virgin and Child surrounded by red and blue angels and is now at the Royal Museum of Fine Arts, Antwerp. Since at least the seventeenth century, the Virgin has been recognized as a portrait of Agnès Sorel.

Besides his self-portrait miniature, the Louvre has his oil portraits of Charles VII (Note: Durtal, the protagonist of Joris-Karl Huysmans novel Là-bas, says of Charles VII's portrait by Foucquet (as he spells the name): "I have often paused in front of that bestial face, a face in which I can clearly distinguish the snout of a pig, the eyes of the provincial money-lender and the sanctimonious bloated lips of a prelate. The figure in Foucquet's painting resembles a debauched priest with a bad cold sunk in wine-induced self-pity!" Huysmans, J.-K. The Damned [Là-Bas], Penguin Books, 2001, p. 38.) and Guillaume Jouvenel des Ursins and six illuminated manuscript miniatures from the Hours of Étienne Chevalier, the Histoire ancienne jusqu'à César and the Faits des Romains.

== Gallery ==
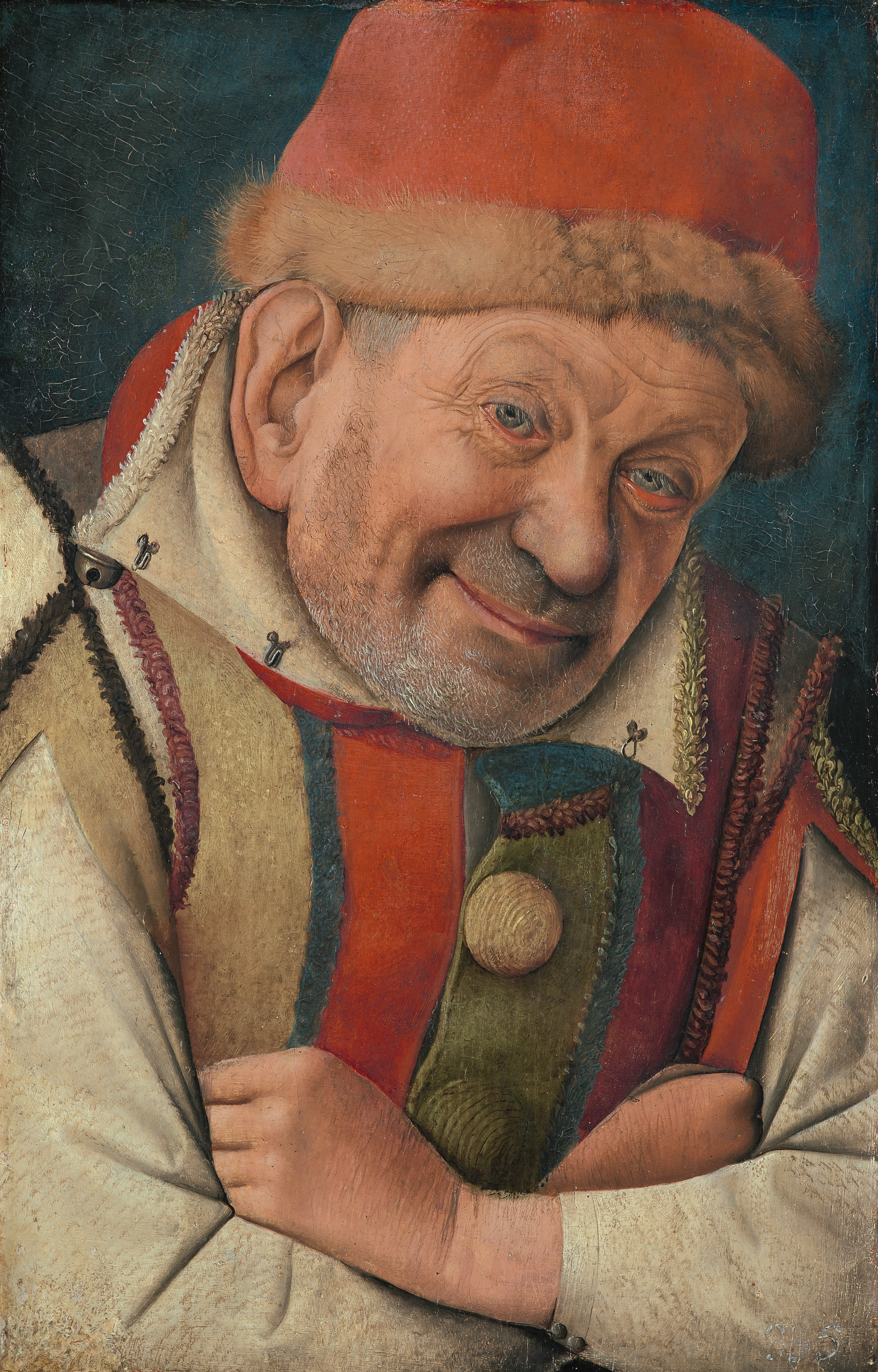
Portrait of the Court Jester Pietro Gonnella, c. 1440-1445, Kunsthistorisches Museum, Vienna

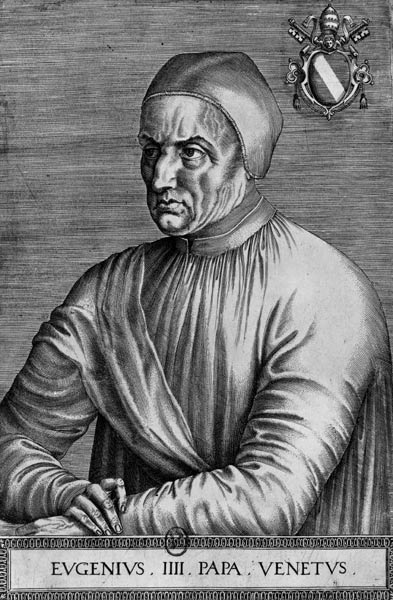
Copy of the lost Portrait of Pope Eugene IV

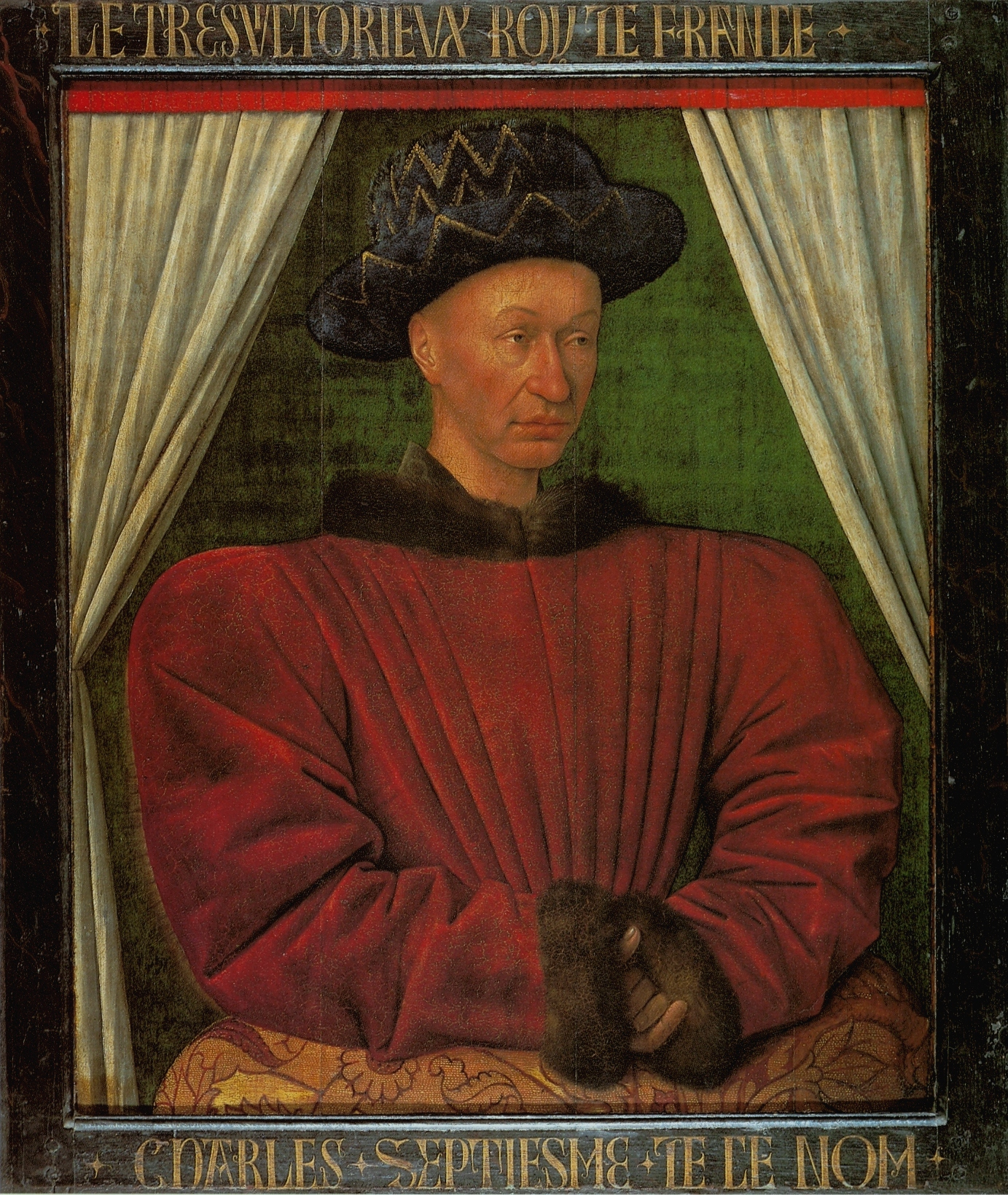
Portrait of Charles VII, c. 1450-1455, Louvre, Paris.

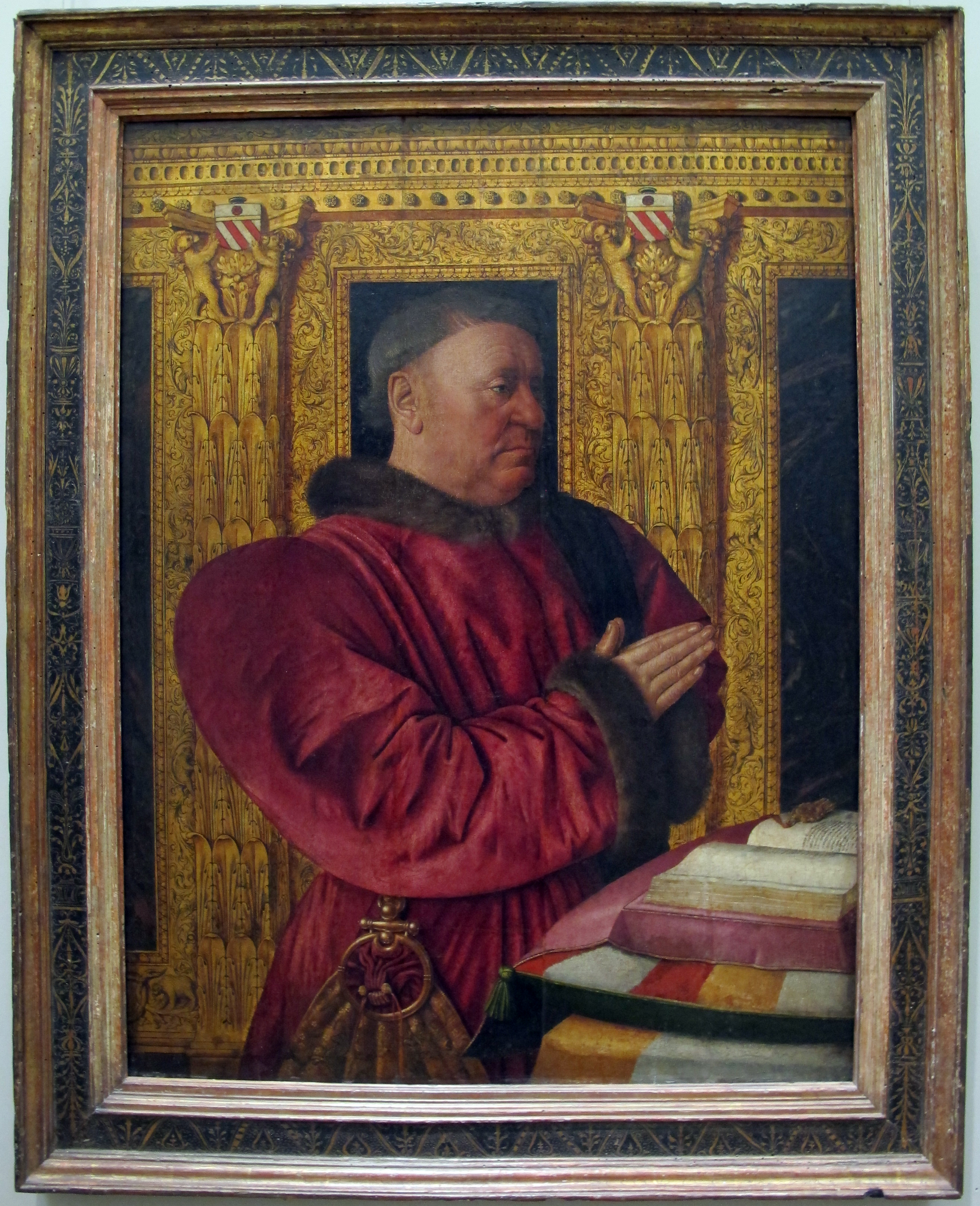
Portrait of Guillaume Jouvenel des Ursins, c. 1460-1465, Louvre, Paris.

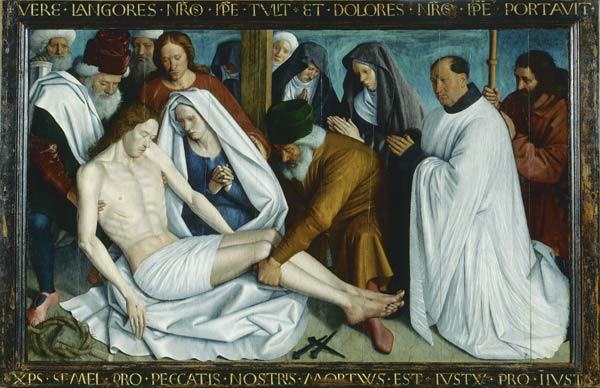
Pieta of Nouans, Church of Nouans-les-Fontaines, c. 1460-1465
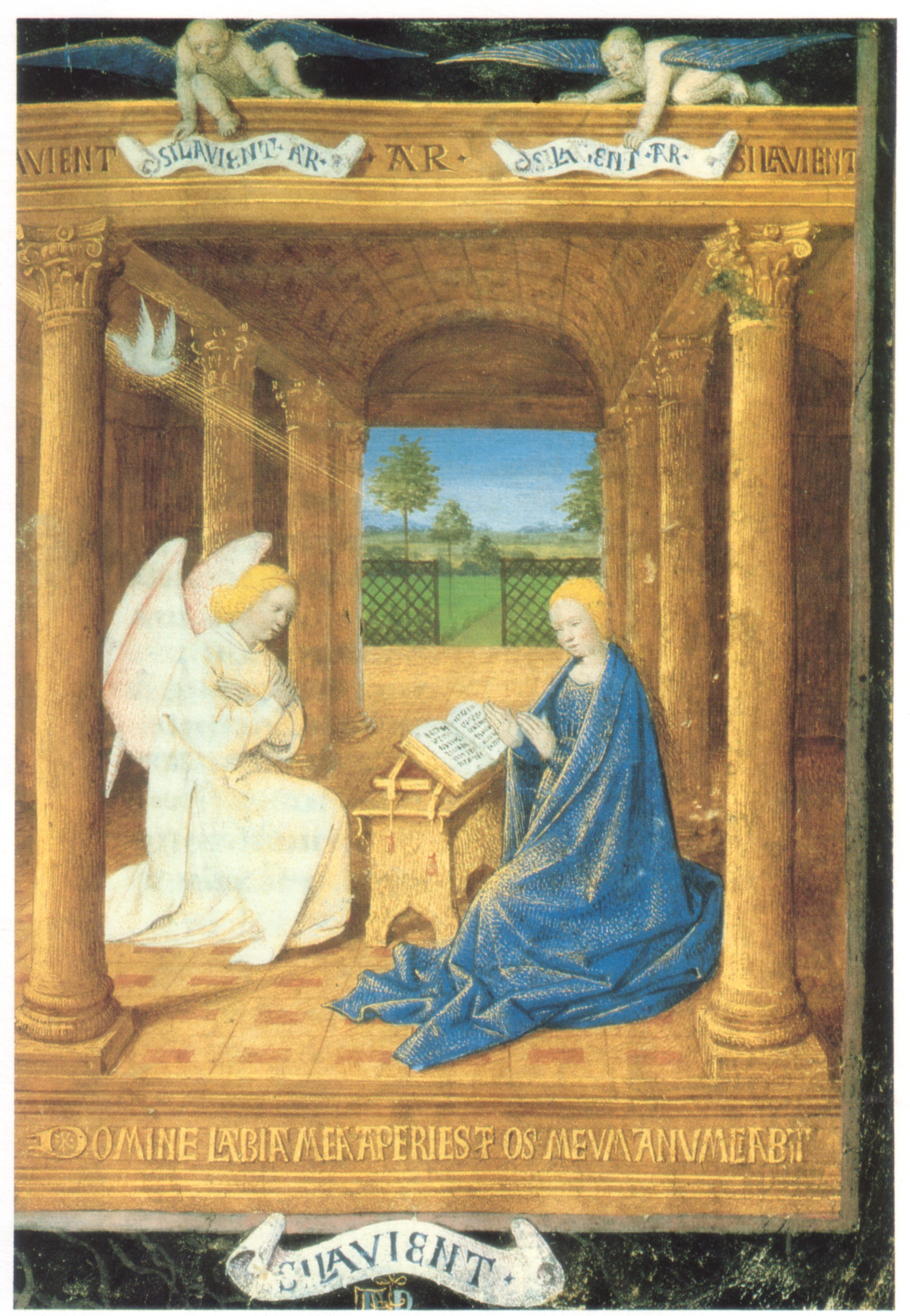
Annunciation

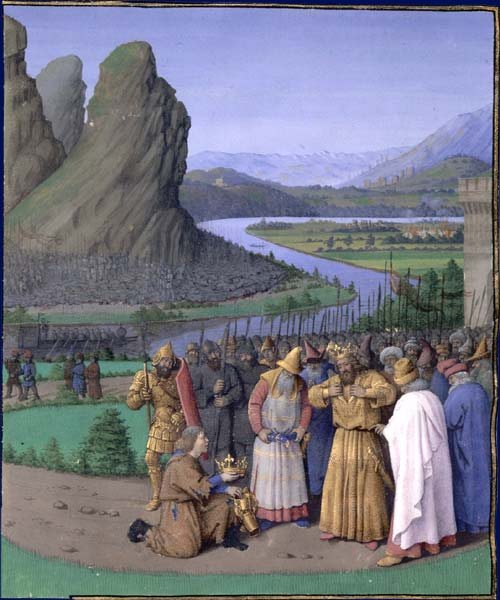
King David and the Amalekite, as described in Antiquities of the Jews by Flavius Josephus

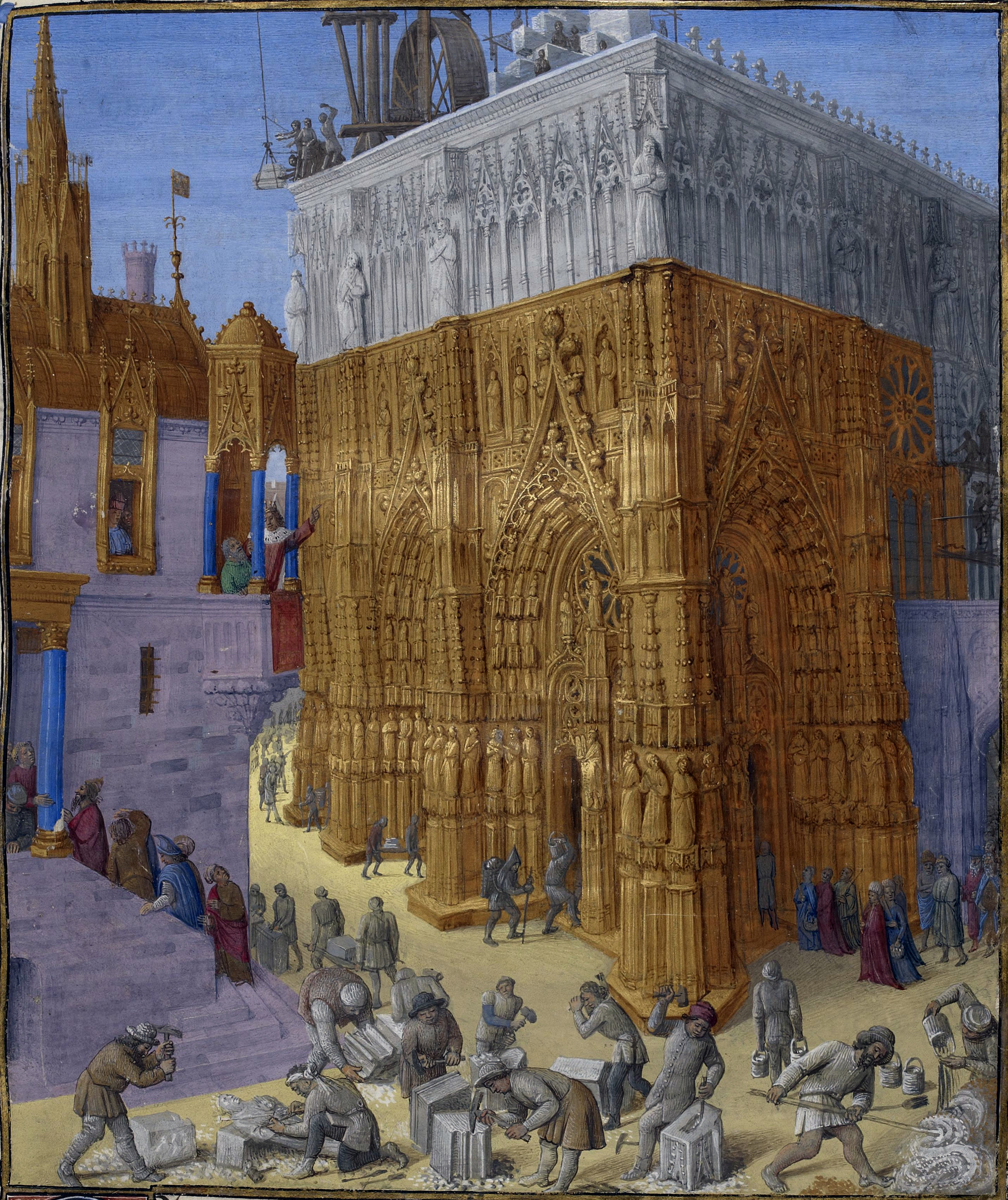
Construction of the Temple of Jerusalem

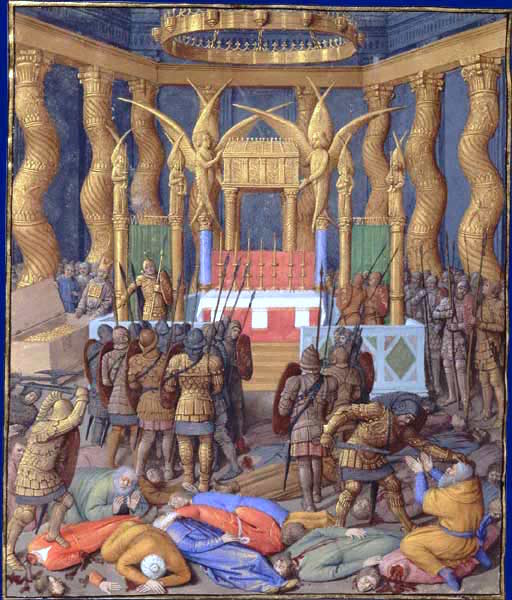
Pompey in the Temple of Jerusalem, as described in Antiquities of the Jews by Flavius Josephus

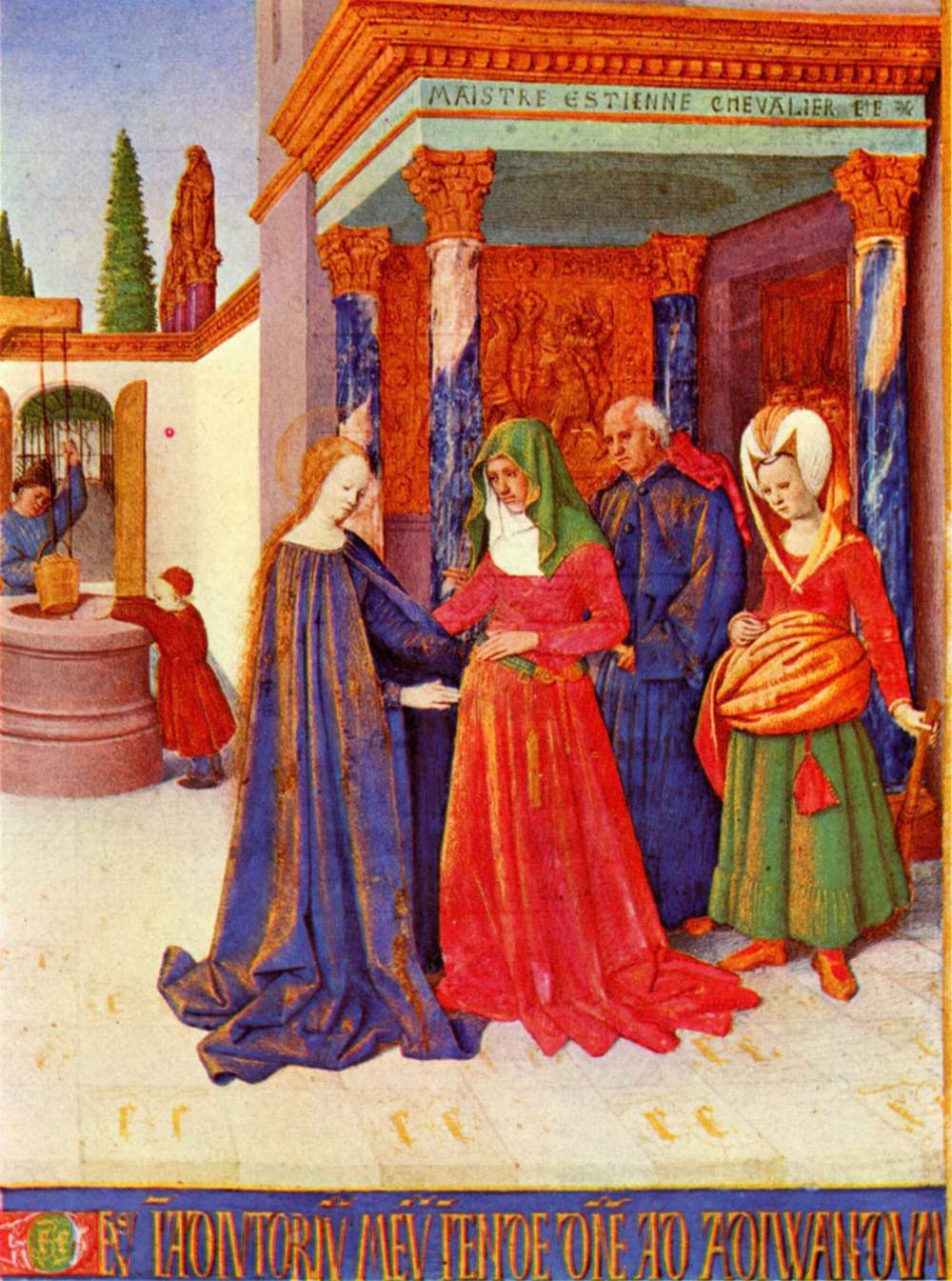
Book of Hours

== See also ==
- Book of Hours of Simon de Varie
