= Portrait of the Court Jester Gonella =

c. 1450 painting attributed to Jean Fouquet

Portrait of the court jester Gonella
- Ritratto del Buffone Gonella (Italian)
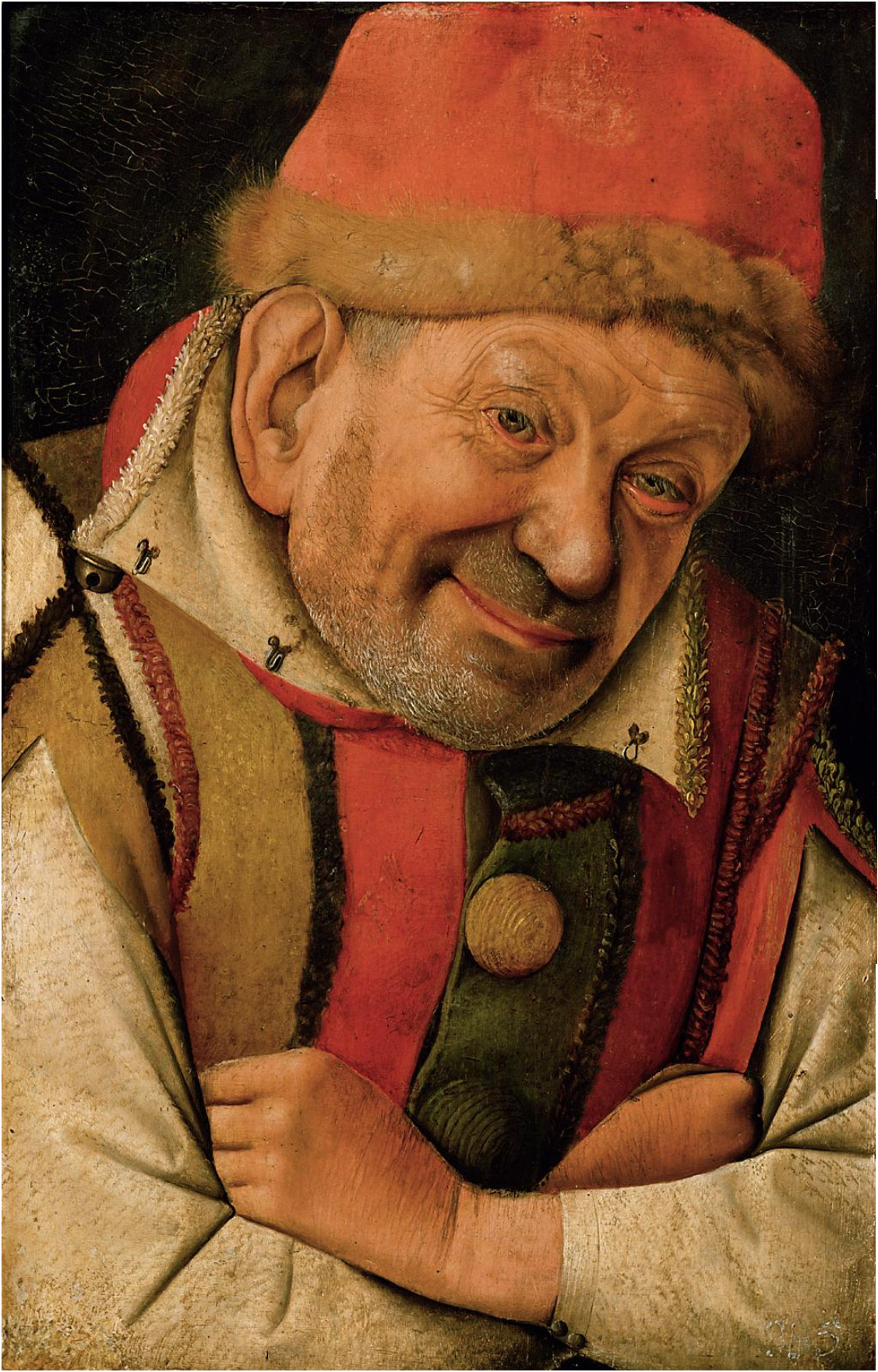
- Artist: Jean Fouquet (?)
- Year: c. 1450
- Type: painting
- Medium: Oil on wood (oak panel)
- Dimensions: 36.3 cm × 25.9 cm (14.3 in × 10.2 in)
- Location: Kunsthistorisches Museum; Vienna

Portrait of the court jester Gonella (Italian: Ritratto del Buffone Gonella) is a painting attributed to Jean Fouquet. It is believed to depict Pietro Gonella, a jester at the court of Este in Ferrara. The painting was created around 1450 and is currently housed in the Vienna Kunsthistorisches Museum.

== Provenance ==
In the inventory of the Archduke Leopold Wilhelm of Austria's collection, dated 1659, the painting is described as: "a small portrait (...) of the jester Gonella, with a short beard, in a red cap, and in red and yellow clothing". The model's costume —heraldic attire, "mi parti"— may indicate, that the depicted figure was close to the House of Este. However, this identification is questioned by many historians.

Austrian art historian Otto Pächt believed that Jean Fouquet could have seen Gonella during his stay in Italian Ferrara in 1445, (Note: Fouquet's trip to Italy is known from an account by the Florentine architect and sculptor Antonio Filarete. It took place between 1443 and 1447.) before he left for Rome, where he painted a portrait of Pope Eugenius IV, dated 1447 (now lost). The absence of Italian painting influences in the portrait suggests that Fouquet was in Ferrara before Rome, rather than during his return to France.

Based on dendrochronological analysis, the painting's basis (baltic oak) dates to the second quarter of the 15th century. The portrait is made on an oak panel — a material that was widely used in Northern Europe, but extremely rare for paintings in Italy. For instance, Nicole Reynaud included the painting in Fouquet’s catalog (1981) and suggested that the portrait was painted before the artist’s arrival to Rome, but during his Italian journey, dating it to the mid-1440s. There is also a hypothesis that Gonella visited the court of Charles VII, where the artist could have seen him.

== Model ==
Information about Pietro Gonella from surviving sources is highly contradictory. Some documents indicate that the jester Gonella lived at the court of Obizzo III d’Este (1294–1352), Marquis of Ferrara from 1326, while other sources suggest he lived at the court of Niccolò III d’Este (1393–1441), who ruled from 1393.

The jester died as a victim of his own wit, and it is recounted by Matteo Bandello in one of his novellas (No. XVII). When Niccolò III d’Este fell seriously ill with intermittent fever, Gonella knew a "cure method" of sudden fright. During a walk, the jester suddenly pushed his lord into the shallow waters of the Po River. Niccolò recovered but decided to repay the jester in kind and announced his banishment from Ferrara. Gonella, confident in his impunity, returned to Ferrara, where he was seized on the marquis’s orders and imprisoned, with an announcement of his impending execution (in reality, it was supposed to be a staged event). On the day of the "execution", as Gonella placed his head on the block, the executioner poured a bucket of cold water on him, and Gonella died of fright. According to Bandello, the marquis regretted playing such an unfortunate joke on Gonella.

== Composition ==
The man depicted in the portrait is dressed in a costume of heraldic colors with yellow, red, and green stripes, (Note: The heraldic clothing received its final form in Europe in the 13th century, worn not only by feudal lords, but also by their vassals and servants. Most often, the coat of arms or "mi parti" combined four colors as the field of the coat of arms.) with a cap of a style common in France. On his right hand, according to Pächt, he wears a glove, likely a later overpainting of the original work. The jester’s hands are crossed, his head is tilted, and he is positioned so close to the viewer that it seems as though he is leaning out of the window. Both, the position of the hands and the forward projection of the figure, are atypical for portraits of nobility from that era and are likely related to the low social status of the model:

"The face, with a penetrating gaze, deep wrinkles, and a bitter expression make this character unforgettable…"

According to Carlo Ginzburg, the model’s pose is a parodic reference to the iconography of imago pietatis — the sorrowful image of Christ in the Tomb, an allusion to Gonella’s tragic fate. The portrait is made in oil on an oak panel 0.4 cm thick, measuring 36.3×25.9 cm. The back of the panel is finished to resemble marble. Originally, the panel was framed, and the frame was primed along with the panel but was later removed.

== Authorship ==
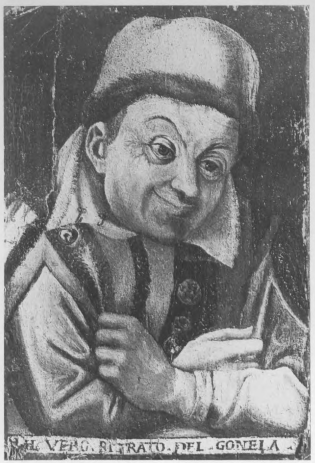
Copy of the painting Portrait of the court jester Gonella 17th century. Private collection, Ferrara

In the 1659 inventory, the painting is described as a copy of an original by Giovanni Bellini "in Albrecht Dürer style". The masterful rendering of the figure’s face prompted researchers to seek the artist among the most renowned painters of the era, sometimes proposing highly improbable attributions. 19th century art historians, starting with Eduard von Engerth, who "rediscovered" the portrait in 1882 while working on the catalog of the imperial collection, saw it as a work not of the North Italian school but rather of the Flemish school, suggesting it was painted by Jan van Eyck. According to Louis Gons (Louis Gonse, 1891), it was a work by Pieter Bruegel the Elder.

According to art historian Begeer, the work is by van Eyck. Comparing the jester’s face with that of Cardinal Albergati in a portrait by van Eyck, the researcher found similarities in the handling of minute details, which, in her view, undoubtedly proved that the author of Gonella’s portrait was one of the founders of the new Netherlandish painting.

Begeer was also the first to draw attention to a copy of the portrait (made in the 17th century), kept in a private collection in Ferrara, with the inscription: IL. VERO. RITRATO. DEL. GONELA., thus identifying the subject of the original portrait. A photograph of the copy is held in the Kunsthistorisches Museum in correspondence from 1940. At that time, it was part of the Professor Mario Pandolfi's collection in Ferrara, and since 1948, it was part of the collection of another Ferrara resident — Giulio Chiorboli. Despite efforts by Italian researchers, it was impossible to

obtain more precise information about the copy or to examine it. (Note: Art historian Ilaria Toesca and Ramieri Varese, director of the Municipal Museum of Ferrara, tried to find out more about it.) Detlev Kreidl found similarities between the preparatory drawing of the original portrait and its copy (folds, hand positions), suggesting that the Ferrara copy provides insight into how the Vienna portrait looked before alterations were made. (Note: The shape of the jester's thumb on the copy is characteristic of 15th-century northern painting, and the thumbs on the Pieta attributed to Fouquet from the Nouhant parish church are similar.)

Between the two world wars, the portrait was attributed to a follower of van Eyck, with researchers dating its creation to the mid-15th century.

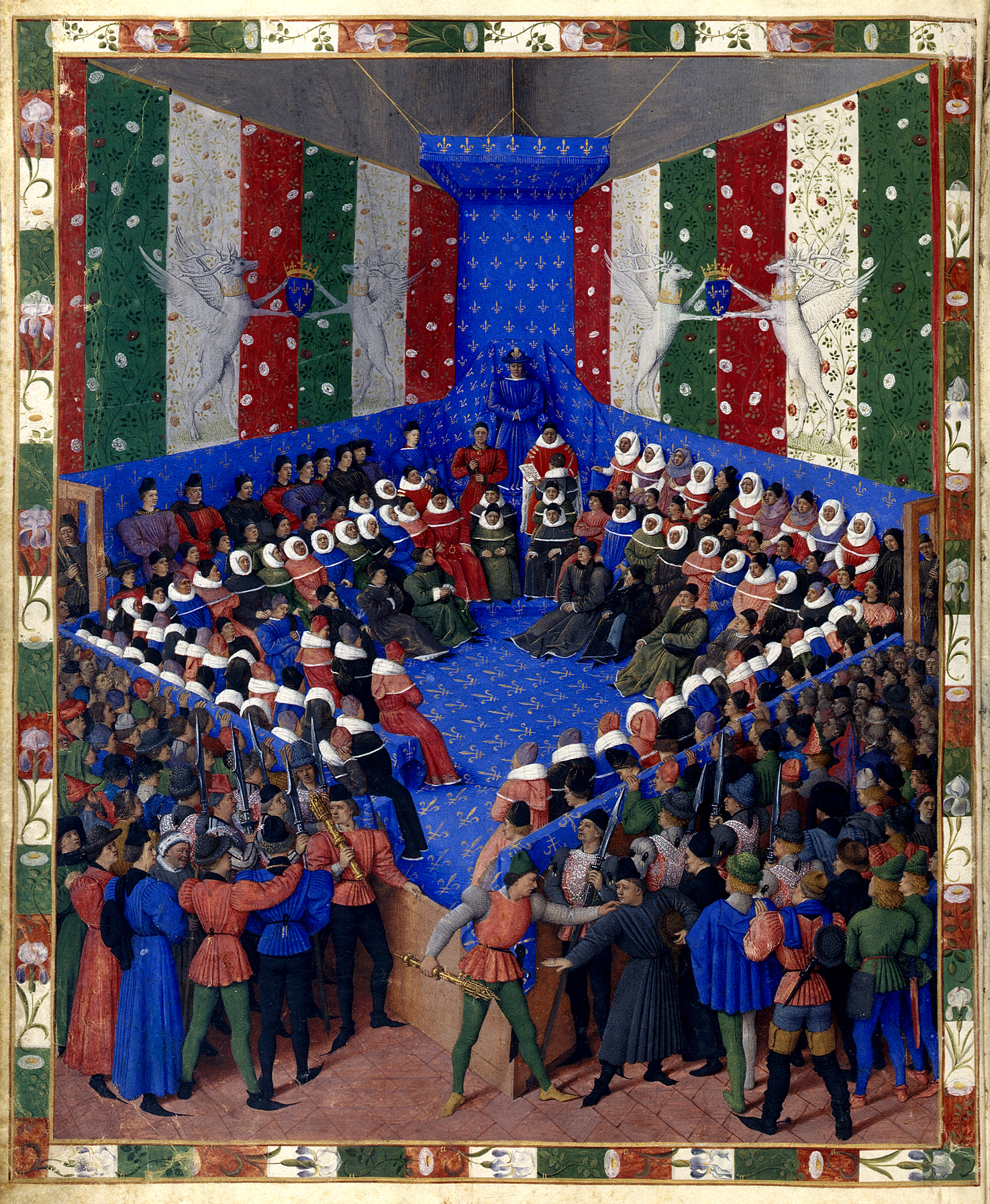

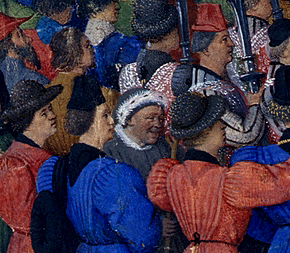
Jean Fouquet. The Trial of the Duke of Alanson. Frontispiece of Boccaccio's Munich, 1359-1360 (left). Detail of the painting (right)

In 1974, Otto Pächt first suggested that the portrait was done by Fouquet. He found that the jester’s portrait was stylistically close to Fouquet’s portraits of Charles VII and Guillaume Jouvenel des Ursins. Figures with crossed arms frequently appear in the miniatures of Fouquet and his follower Jean Colombe. The person who served as the model resembles a figure in the crowd in the foreground of the scene The Trial of the Duke of Alençon (French: Lit de justice de Vendôme), a miniature placed on the frontispiece of the Munich Boccaccio (a manuscript of a French translation of The Misfortunes of Noble Men and Women, illustrated by Fouquet in the late 1450s, now held in the Bavarian State Library in Munich). The elderly spectator, depicted in profile, is endowed (unlike most figures in the miniature) with distinctly individual portrait features. The ermine trim on his headgear may hint at proximity to the king.

An infrared examination of the painting conducted in 1981 revealed inscriptions on the preparatory drawing with color names in French—fully legible inscriptions include "white" and "red", with fragments of two others surviving—supporting the hypothesis that the portrait was created by a French artist or someone fluent in French. (Note: By 1986, the results of the study had only been partially published.) Fouquet’s authorship is accepted by many art historians (including A. Chastel, K. Schaefer, and C. Ginzburg), although Albert Châtelet and François Avril still consider the question of authorship unresolved.

== Bibliography ==
- Dzuffi, S. (2008). Возрождение. XV век. Кватроченто [Renaissance. 15th century. Quattrocento]. Художественные эпохи (in Russian). М.: Омега. p. 10. ISBN 978-5-465-01772-5.
- Zolotova, E. (1986). Жан Фуке [Jean Fouquet] (in Russian). М.: Изобразительное искусство. p. 157.
- Yegerman, E (2001). Итальянская новелла Возрождения [Italian Renaissance Novel] (in Russian). Самара: АВС. p. 768. ISBN 5-93279-032-6.
- Chatelet, A. (1997). "Le portrait de «Gonella» (Vienne, Kunsthistorisches Museum) peut-il être attribué à Fouquet?" [Can the portrait of “Gonella” (Vienna, Kunsthistorisches Museum) be attributed to Fouquet?]. Bulletin Monumental (in French). 155 (2): 154–155. doi:10.3406/bulmo.1997.893000.
- Pächt, O. (1974). Die Autorschaft des Gonella-Bildnisses // Jahrbuch des Kunsthistorischen Sammlungen in Wien [The authorship of the Gonella portrait] (in German). Vol. 70. pp. 39–86.
- Kreidl, D. (1974). Technologische Beschreibung des Bildnisses des ferraresischen Hofnarren Gonella [Technological description of the portrait of the Ferrarese court jester Gonella] (in German). Vol. 70. Jahrbuch des Kunsthistorischen Sammlungen in Wien. pp. 86–88.
- Avril, F. (2003). Jean Fouquet, peintre et enlumineur du XVe siècle, catalogue de l'exposition [Jean Fouquet, painter and illuminator of the 15th century, exhibition catalog] (in French). Paris: Hazan. ISBN 2-7177-2257-2.

== Links ==
- Portrait of the court jester Gonella in KHM-Museumsverband.
- Portrait of the court jester Gonella in BnF.
