= Nicolas Chevalier =

Nicolas Chevalier, Baron de Grissé (1562–1630) was first president of the Cour des aides in Paris from 20 April 1610, as well as Councillor of State, superintendent of Navarre and Béarn, and twice ambassador to England.

Chevalier was the last direct male descendant of Étienne Chevalier, inheriting and augmenting his book collection and town house in the rue de la Verrerrie, as well as building up an enviable art collection.

In a speech made on 19 March 1627 he deprecated the state of France since the death of Henri IV in 1610, for which he was formally in disgrace from April 1627 to 28 March 1628.

Chevalier died 19 February 1630. His wife, Madeleine de Crevecoeur, had died the previous year, 1629. His heir was René de Longueil.
