= Melun Diptych =

Two-panel oil painting by Jean Fouquet

- The Melun Diptych
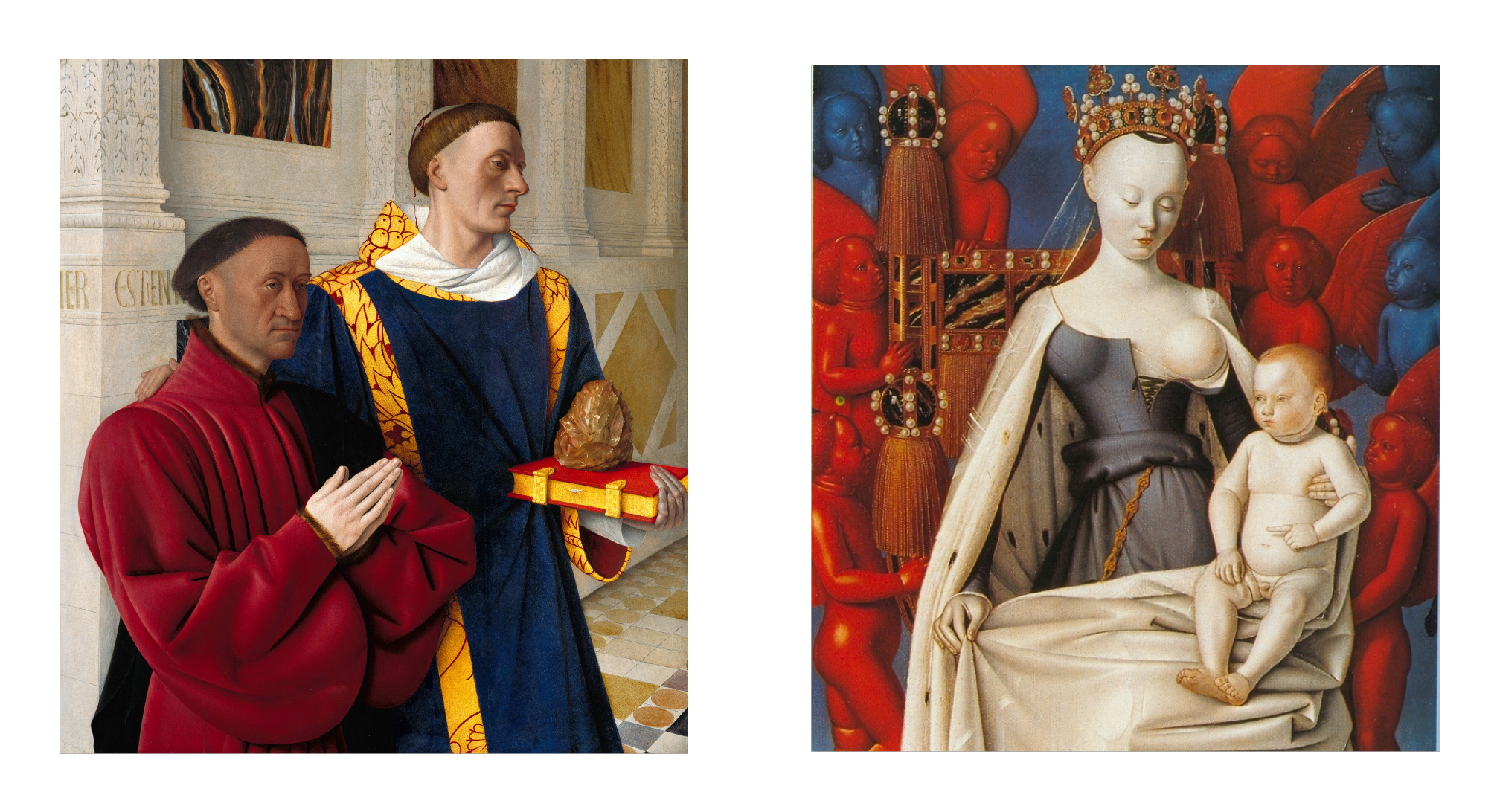
- Artist: Jean Fouquet
- Year: c. 1450s (Julian)
- Movement: Northern Renaissance
- Dimensions: 120 cm (47 in) × 224 cm (88 in)
- Location: Royal Museum of Fine Arts Antwerp, France, Belgium, Germany

The Melun Diptych is a two-panel oil painting by the French court painter Jean Fouquet (c. 1420–1481) created around 1452. The name of this diptych came from its original home in the Collegiate Church of Notre-Dame in Melun. The left panel depicts Étienne Chevalier with his patron saint St. Stephen and the right panel depicts the Virgin and Christ Child surrounded by cherubim. Each wooden panel measures about 93 by 85 centimeters and the two would have been hinged together at the center.

The two pieces, originally a diptych, are now separated. The left panel is in the Gemäldegalerie in Berlin and the right panel is at the Royal Museum of Fine Arts, Antwerp, Belgium. A self-portrait medallion is also associated with the two panels. Measuring 6 centimeters in diameter, it would have adorned the frame, and consists of copper, enamel, and gold. The medallion is now in the Louvre in Paris, France.

== Description ==
=== Right-hand panel ===
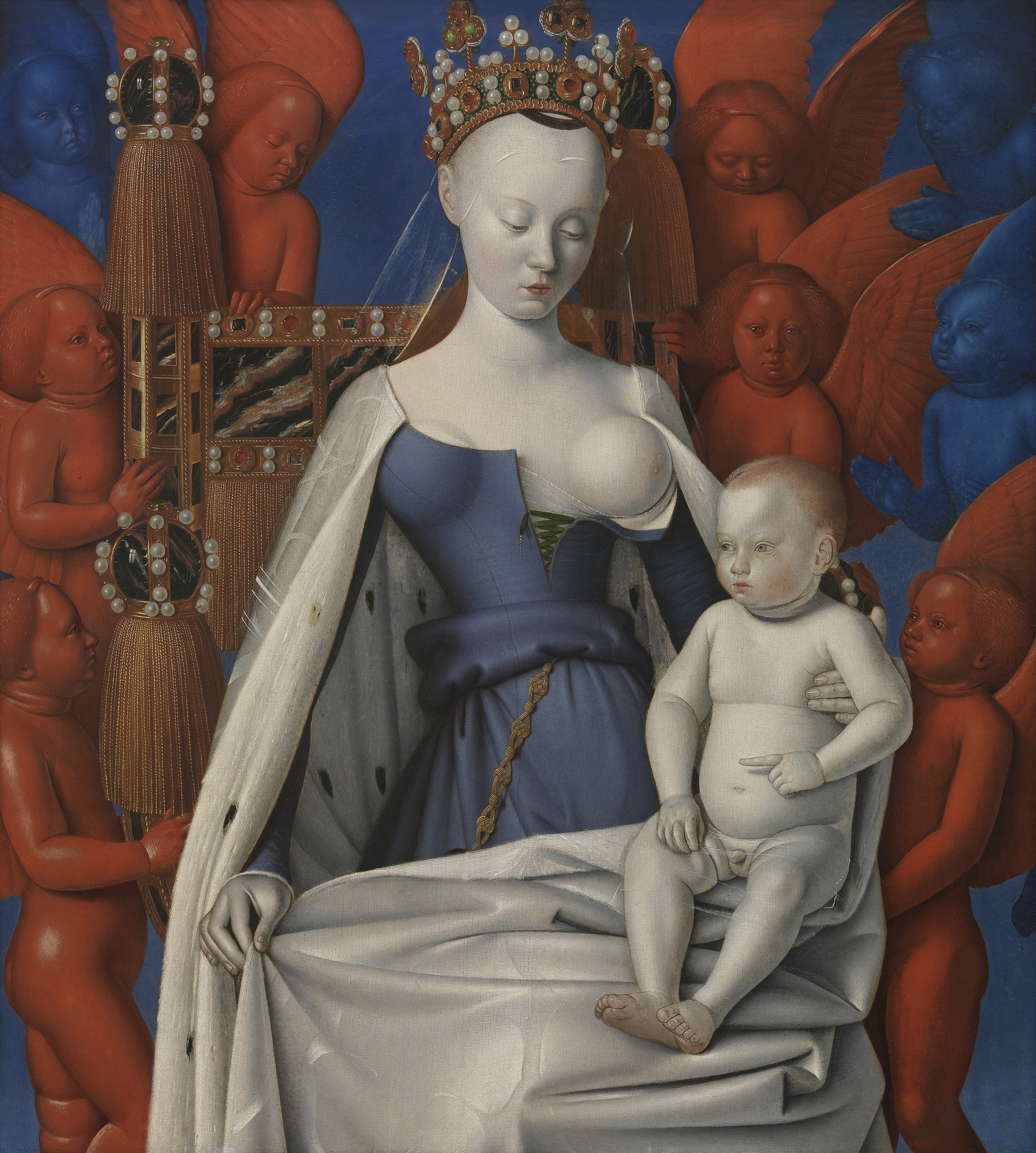
Virgin and Child Surrounded by Angels, right wing of the diptych, Royal Museum of Fine Arts, Antwerp

Seated on an elaborate gold throne, the Madonna and the Christ Child are depicted in the right panel. The Madonna wears a blue dress, white mantle and a jewel-encrusted crown. She is a Virgo lactans or breast-feeding Madonna, a common type, although here the feeding has stopped. On her lap sits the Child, who makes a pointing gesture to the left with his left hand at the patron and the saint. The two are surrounded by blue and red cherubim, which greatly contrast with the pale skin of the Virgin and Child. Although the figures are modeled realistically, the mood is otherworldly, described by the art critic Roger Fry as a dreamlike state of sentimentalism. The Madonna is depicted here as the Queen of Heaven, and the painting is meant to reveal her as between the veil of heaven and earth. She is both human and otherworldly. The unnatural colors have been attributed to represent the heraldic colors of the king, being red, white, and blue.

The Virgin is believed to be an idealized portrait of Agnès Sorel, mistress of King Charles VII, who died two years earlier. Sorel was considered by many at the time to be "the most beautiful woman in the world" and therefore an obvious choice after which to model the Virgin. This makes the depiction what art historians call a "disguised portrait". As minister of finance to the king, Étienne Chevalier was the executor of her will. Her costume and physical attributes have been compared to other representations of Sorel, such as another painting by Fouquet in which her dress is very similar to that in the diptych. It has also been suggested that the woman could be Chevalier's wife, Catherine Bude, over whose tomb the diptych was hung in Notre Dame, Melun.

=== Left-hand panel ===
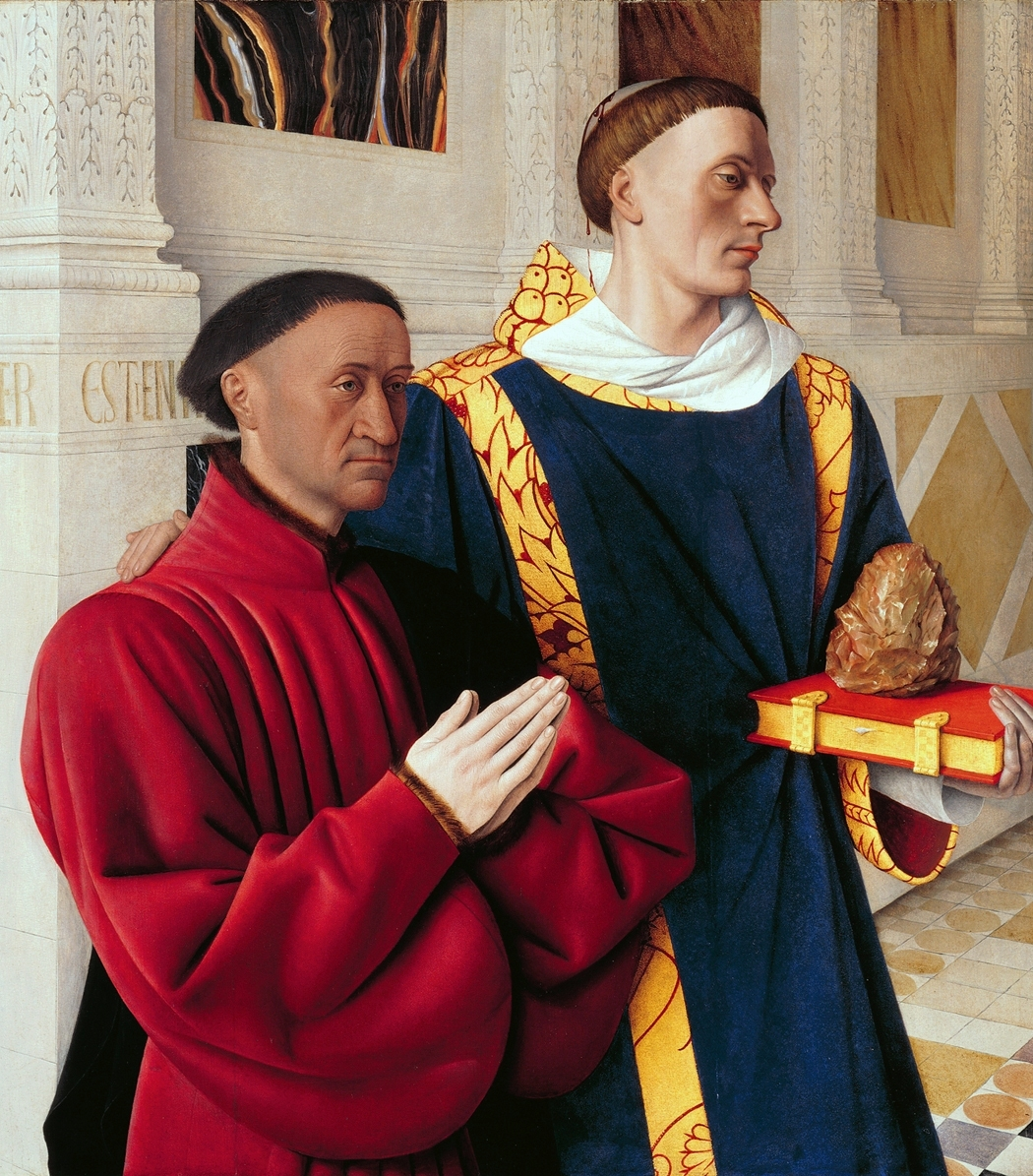
Left wing of the diptych depicts Étienne Chevalier with his patron saint St. Stephen, now in Gemäldegalerie, Berlin

On the left Étienne Chevalier, the treasurer to King Charles VII of France, kneels in a red robe with his hands in a position of prayer. The king liked to have non-aristocrats such as Chevalier about him because he thought them more reliable than nobles. On his right is Chevalier's patron saint, St. Stephen, in dark deacon's robes with gold trim. His right arm is draped across Chevalier's shoulder while his left hand holds a book and a jagged rock, his representational attribute as he was stoned to death. Archaeologists have identified the stone as a depiction of a prehistoric human artefact, likely an Acheulean hand axe from c. 160,000–300,000 years ago. Its red–brown colour is characteristic of flint tools commonly found in northern France and eastern Britain, which Fouquet was probably familiar with. Both men gaze off to the right as if they were looking at the Virgin and child on the other panel. The wall behind the treasurer and his patron saint is inlaid with marble panels and has elaborate white and gold moldings. The tiled floor's neutral colors create a stark contrast with the saturated colors of the men's robes. Identifying Chevalier is an engraving on the wall behind him that says "IER ESTIEN". This lettering has been used to link the painting to Fouquet since he never signed any of his work. It is very similar to lettering used in several miniatures which are attributed to him.

=== Medallion ===
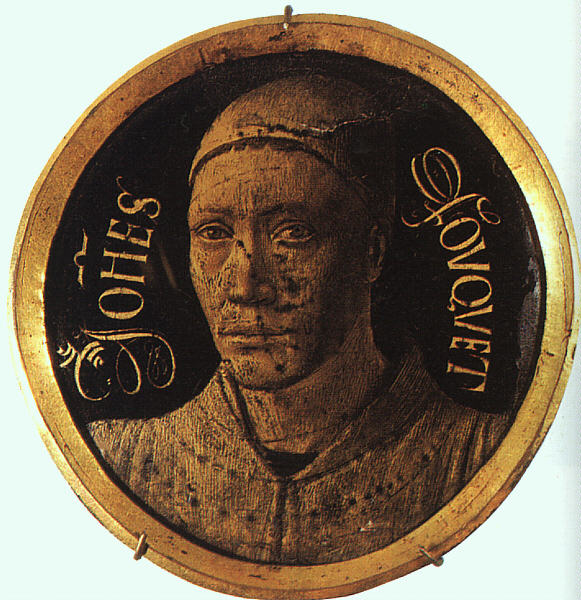
Medallion originally on the frame now at the Louvre

The original frame was covered in blue velvet with silver and gold embroidery, antique love knots, and pearls. It also included a self-portrait medallion of Jean Fouquet. Fouquet is shown frontally, his gold image is engraved into the black enamel background and framed by his name. It is believed that he invented this technique. The original position of the diptych high above the tomb would have made it difficult to see the tiny medallion and since the pieces have since been separated, its exact position on the frame is unclear. The medallion was Fouquet's way of signing the diptych. It is traditionally recognized as the oldest self-signed self-portrait and is Fouquet's only signed work.

== Background ==
Much information about Fouquet's life is obscure. The artist was born in 1420 in Tours, France. He traveled to Rome in 1446 for two years as part of a French delegation. Fouquet was employed by Charles VII and Louis XI and was called "peintre du roi" meaning painter to the king. He was called upon to create portraits, manuscript illuminations, altarpieces, ephemeral decorations, and sculptural designs. He is believed to have traveled to Florence and Venice where he studied the work of contemporary Italian masters. This influence can be seen in the Melun Diptych as it has been suggested that the background of the left panel is an Italian courtyard in empirical perspective, not unlike Jacopo Bellini's method. In contrast to the Madonna and child panel, which lacks perspective completely, the background behind Chevalier and St. Stephen extends deep into space in a truly Italian style. The figures are also clear and modeled realistically in the Italian style as opposed to his native French.

In the case of the right panel, the figures are so smooth they appear to be polished. This effect enhances the otherworldly aspects of this panel, in contrast to the very realistic rendering of the left panel. Étienne Chevalier commissioned the Melun Diptych to hang over his wife's tomb. Chevalier had a close relationship with Fouquet and was his main patron during his time as treasurer to the king. The diptych was hung above Catharine Bude's tomb. This has caused controversy over whether a third panel is now lost. Some scholars believe it may have formed part of a triptych of which the third panel would have depicted Chevalier's wife since it was meant to be hung above her tomb. This could have tied the two different existing panels into a more cohesive piece. Others believe this is not the case. A report from Denys Godefroy who saw the piece in its original context in 1660, and is therefore the most reputable source available today, does not describe a third panel.

Until 1775, the diptych remained in the church of Notre Dame in Melun. In need of funds for restoration, the chapter decided to sell the panels. The right panel was purchased by the mayor of Antwerp and has remained in the city since 1840. The left panel was purchased by Clemens Brentano, a German poet, and joined his collection in 1896. The halves have been reunited at least three times since their separation, the first time in 1904 when France borrowed the panels from Berlin for an exhibition of French primitives the second time in 1937 for the Exposition Internationale des Arts et Techniques dans la Vie Moderne in Paris, and the third time in 2017 for the Jean Fouquet exhibition at the Gemäldegalerie in Berlin.

== See also ==
- Breastfeeding in art
