= Collegiate Church of Notre-Dame, Melun =

Church in Seine-et-Marne, France

Coordinates: 48°32′08″N 2°39′37″E

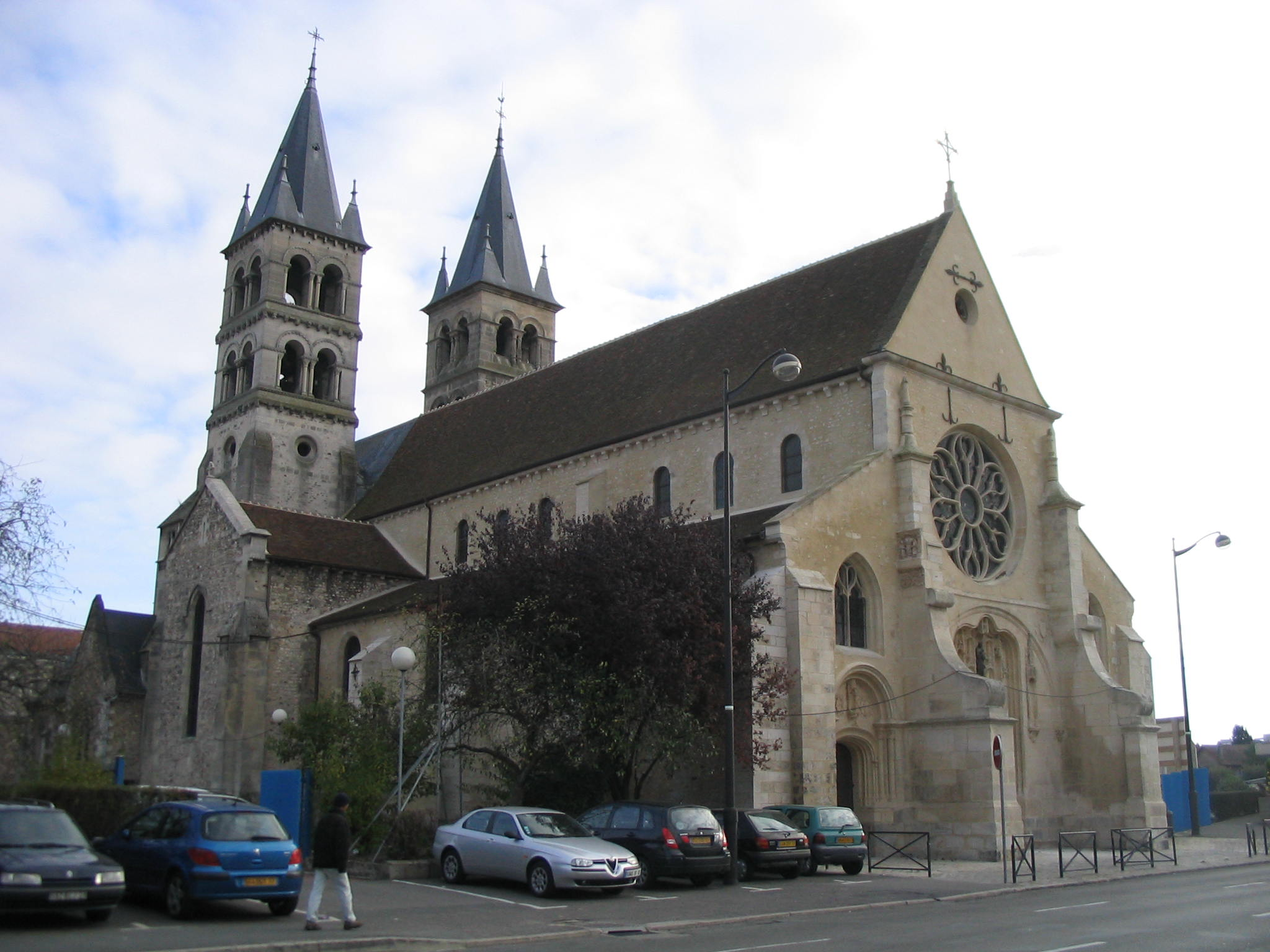
Collegiate Church of Notre-Dame

The Collegiate Church of Notre-Dame (French: Collégiale Notre-Dame de Melun) was a collegiate church, now a parish church in the French town of Melun, on rue de la Courtille on the île Saint-Etienne.

== History ==
The building dates back to the 11th century and was founded by Robert II of France on the site of an earlier church. Notre-Dame had the status of collegiate church prior to the French Revolution, when the building was secularised. It is now the property of the commune, but has been restored to religious uses.

== Movable heritage ==
A famous 15th century painting, the Melun Diptych, was commissioned by Étienne Chevalier to hang in the church. It remained there until the 18th century.

The church has a two-manual Cavaillé-Coll organ. The instrument was acquired at the end of the 19th century from the singer Pauline Viardot.

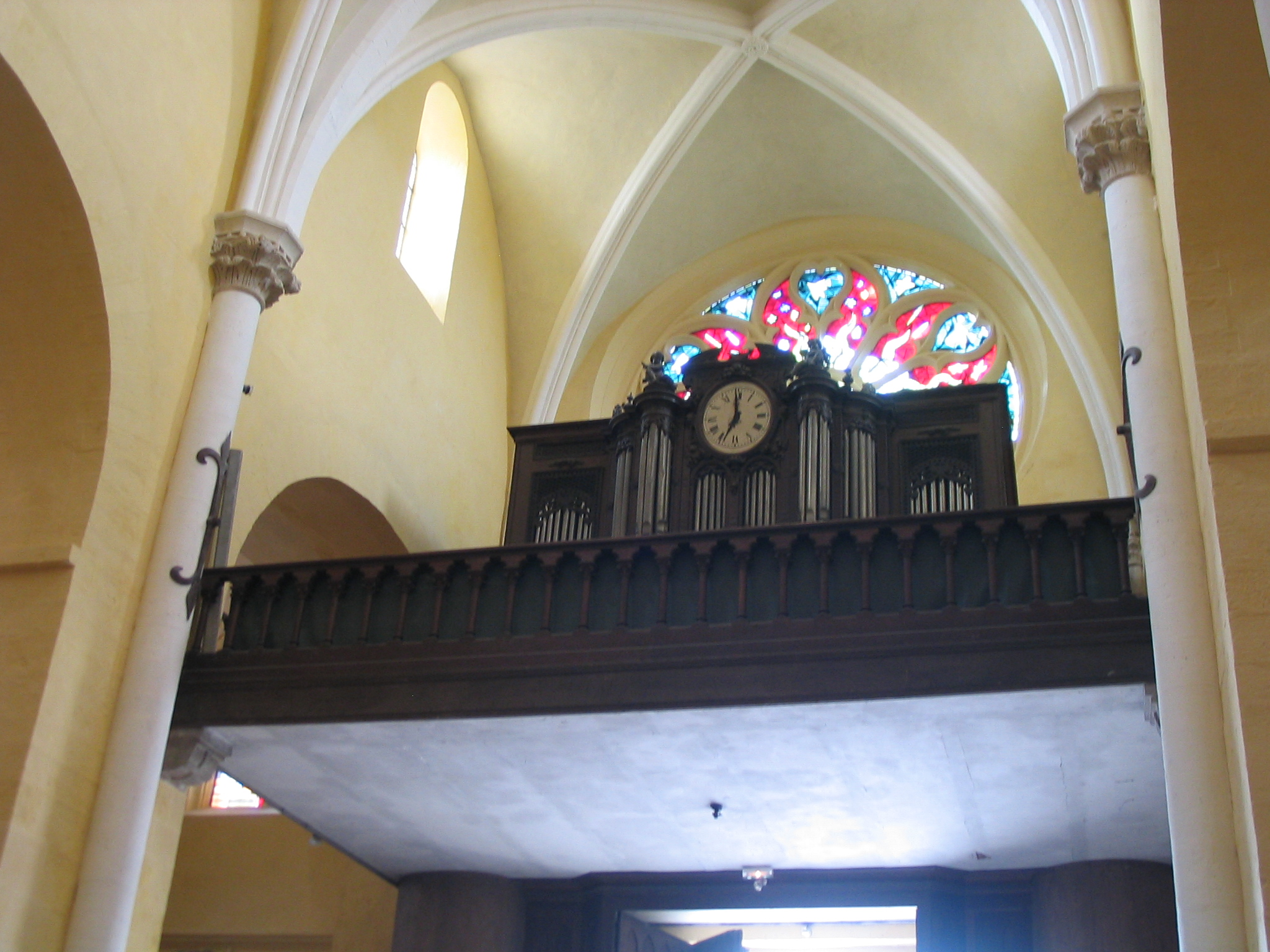
The organ

== Conservation ==
In 1840 it was given a heritage designation, monument historique. Some restoration work was carried out in the 19th century.

The building suffered damage in the Second World War and much of the glass needed to be replaced.
