= Faits des Romains =

Medieval illuminated book

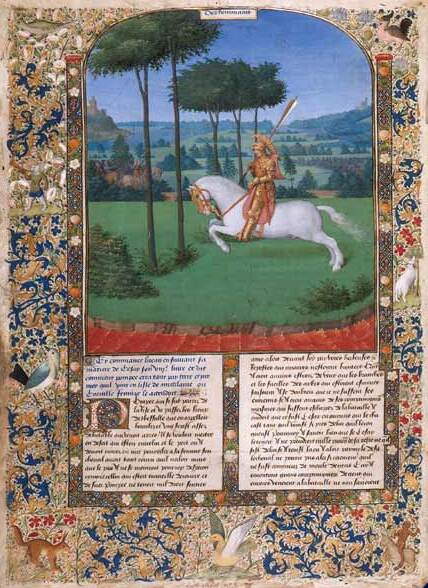
Flight of Pompey after the Battle of Pharsalus, illumination by Jean Fouquet from a manuscript of the Faits des Romains

The Faits des Romains (Li Fet des Romains; Exploits of the Romans) is a medieval work of prose written in Old French, composed in the Île-de-France, or by a native of that region, around 1213–1214. It chronicles the life of Julius Caesar.

== Details ==
It is primarily a compilation from the works of four Roman writers: Caesar himself, Lucan, Suetonius and Sallust. It is the first biography wholly dedicated to the Roman leader in the vernacular; the historical text also uses literary techniques borrowed from the romance or the chanson de geste.

The anonymous compiler and translator sometimes borrowed the full texts of other works, such as Sallust's De coniuratione Catilinae or Caesar's Commentarii de Bello Gallico, for which the Faits are the first translations into French. He followed his Latin models step by step while constantly adapting the text to the civilisation of his time. In the case of the Commentarii de Bello Gallico, like other medieval writers he incorrectly attributes it not to Caesar himself but to a grammarian, Julius Celsus Constantinus. In his account of the civil war, he followed not Caesar's work, but Lucan's epic poem Pharsalia. Unlike, for example, the author of the contemporary Histoire ancienne jusqu'à César, he renders all the material in consistently styled prose.

== Reception ==
The Faits des Romains was the most popular of several contemporary Old French works of primarily Roman history; beginning in the 14th century, it was a popular manuscript commission, and it remained popular until the end of the Middle Ages. The work was copied to more than fifty manuscripts, many illuminated. Notably, around 1470, Jean Fouquet painted the miniatures of a now dismembered manuscript, of which five sheets are currently held in the Louvre.

The text was translated into Italian in the 13th century and into Portuguese in the 15th century, before 1466, as Vida e feitos de Julio Cesar.

Medieval French authors who wrote about Caesar do not refer to the original Latin texts but to the Faits des Romains, and the text is thus the origin of Caesar's exceptional popularity in aristocratic circles throughout the Middle Ages.

The author portrays Caesar in more or less medieval terms, and focuses on the threat to liberty represented by his power, and on the fight of the Gauls under Vercingetorix for liberty from the Romans; he links the two by relating Caesar's fall to his conquest of Gaul; the text can thus be seen as an allegory of contemporary issues of the aristocratic struggle against the power of the crown.

Jeanette M. A. Beer in her book A Medieval Caesar criticizes the work for exaggerating the relationship between Caesar and the Mauretanian queen Eunoë, greatly expanding on their interactions than exist in historical records. She stated that Caesar is "transformed into a medieval chavillier" and that the author is clearly more interested in Caesar's sexual dominance over the queen than the political dominance he held over her husband Bogud.
