= Étienne Chevalier =

French civil servant (1410–1474)

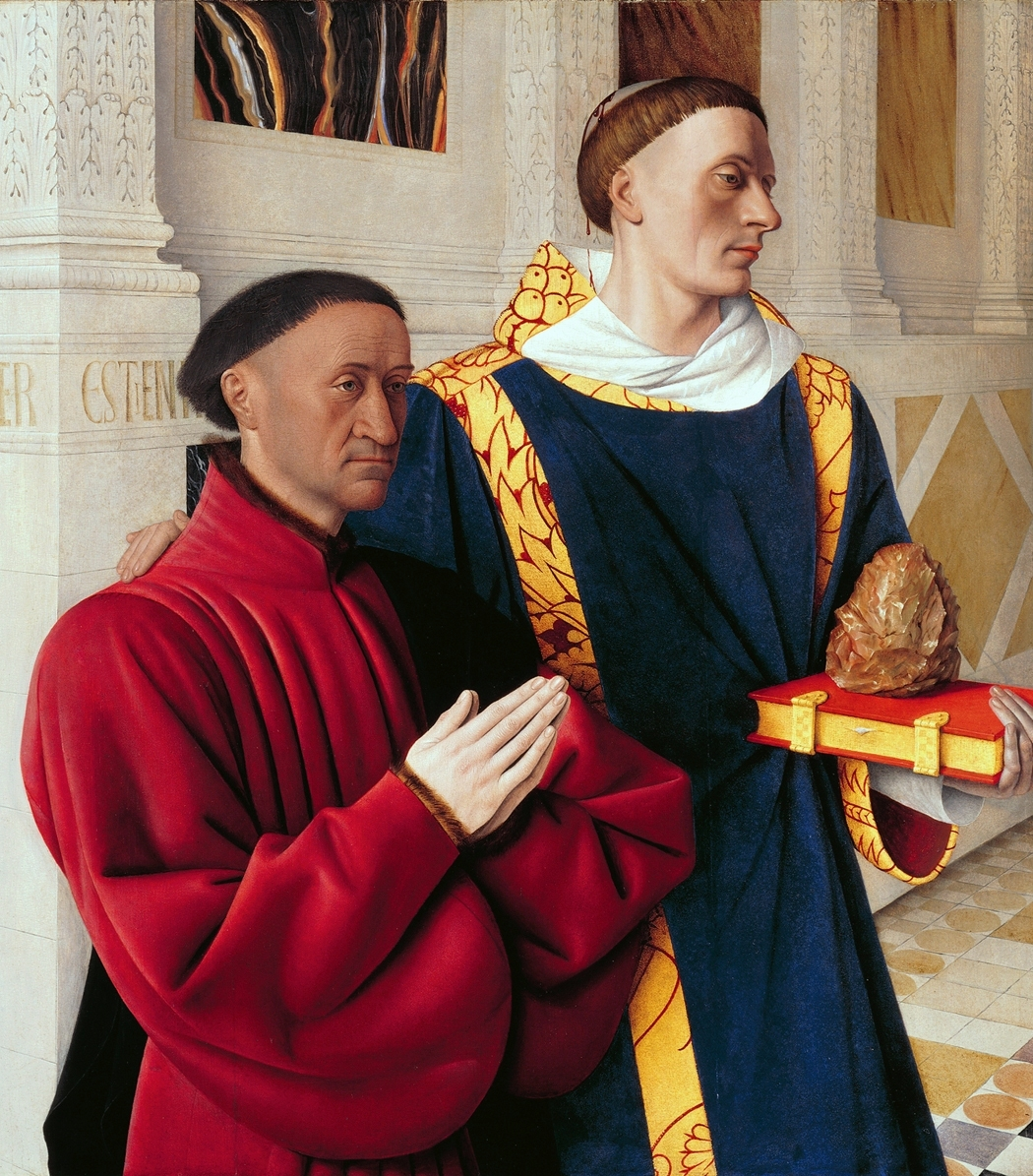
Étienne Chevalier and saint Stephen, Melun Diptych, by Jean Fouquet, c 1456, Gemäldegalerie, Berlin.

Étienne Chevalier (c.1410 in Melun – 1474) was a major civil servant of the French kings Charles VII and Louis XI. He is also notable for commissioning two major works by Jean Fouquet - the Melun Diptych (which he gave to the Collégiale Notre-Dame de Melun) and the Hours of Étienne Chevalier (in which he is shown twice praying before the Virgin, to whom he is presented by his patron saint Stephen).

== Life ==
The son of a secretary to Charles VII, he was twice sent to England with Guillaume Cousinot de Montreuil before becoming secretary to the king, then conseiller and maître des comptes, contrôleur de la recette générale des finances and finally treasurer of France (1452).

Chevalier, Jacques Cœur and the doctor Robert Poitevin were made executors of the king's favourite Agnès Sorel, probably the model for the Virgin Mary in the second panel of the Melun Diptych.

== Sources ==
- (in French) Pierre Clément, Jacques Cœur et Charles VII, ou La France au XVe siècle, Guillaumin, Paris, 1853, pp. 76–77 .
- (in French) Press dossier for the exhibition L'enluminure en France au temps de Jean Fouquet, 26 March - 22 June 2003, musée Condé, château de Chantilly.
