= Cullompton =

Town and civil parish in Devon, England

Coordinates: 50°51′23″N 3°23′38″W

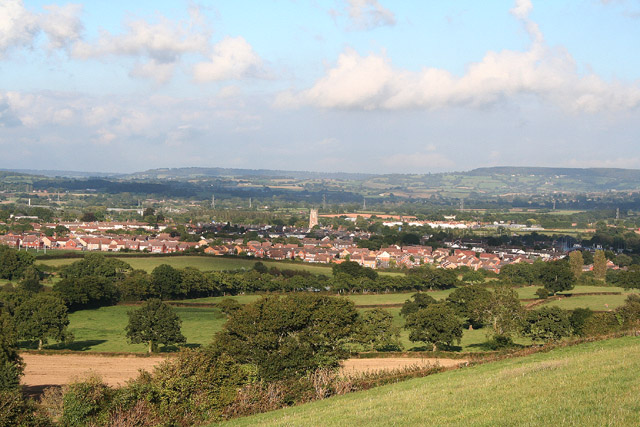
- Cullompton: the town from the south west

- Location within Devon
- Population: 10,492 (2021 census – parish)
- OS grid reference: ST020071
- District: Mid Devon
- Shire county: Devon
- Region: South West
- Country: England
- Sovereign state: United Kingdom
- Post town: CULLOMPTON
- Postcode district: EX15
- Dialling code: 01884
- Police: Devon and Cornwall
- Fire: Devon and Somerset
- Ambulance: South Western
- UK Parliament: Honiton and Sidmouth

Cullompton (/kəˈlʌm(p)tən/) is a town and civil parish in the district of Mid Devon and the county of Devon, England. It is 13 miles (21 km) north-east of Exeter and lies on the River Culm. In 2021, the parish as a whole had a population of 10,017, while the built-up area of the town had a population of 10,492.

The earliest evidence of occupation is from the Roman period: there was a fort on the hill above the town and occupation in the current town centre. Columtune was mentioned in Alfred the Great's will, which left it to his youngest son Æthelweard (c. 880–922).

In the past, the town's economy had a large component of wool and cloth manufacture, then, later, leather working and paper manufacture.

A large proportion of the town's inhabitants are commuters, but there is some local manufacturing, including flour and paper mills. It has a monthly farmers' market held on the second Saturday of every month, which is the oldest event of its kind in the South West. It is home to two grade I listed buildings: the fifteenth-century St Andrew's parish church and the seventeenth-century house known as The Walronds. The centre of the town is a conservation area; there are seven grade II*-listed buildings and ninety grade II-listed buildings in the parish.

== History ==
=== Toponymy and orthography ===
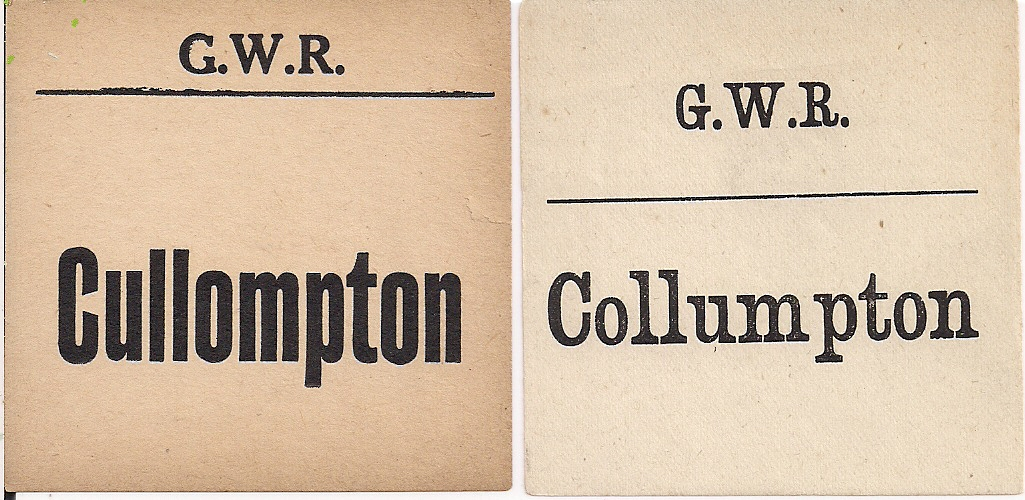
GWR luggage labels for Cullompton, showing both spellings used

The derivation of the name Cullompton is disputed. One derivation is that the town's name means "Farmstead on the River Culm" with Culm probably meaning knot or tie (referring to the river's twists and loops). The other theory is that it is named after Saint Columba of Tir-de-Glas, who preached to West Saxons in 549 AD. The Revd Grubb also states that the parish church was probably formerly dedicated to St Columba (although for the last 500 years it has been dedicated to St Andrew) and that tradition records there was an ancient figure or image of Columba. There are 40 recorded spellings of Cullompton between the first recorded use of the name and the present day, and even as late as the mid-nineteenth century three spellings were in use: the post office spelled it Cullompton; in their 1809 first edition the Ordnance Survey map used Cullumpton and the railway station sign said Collumpton. The railway station sign was changed to Cullompton in 1874 and the Ordnance Survey used Cullompton in the edition of their map published in 1889. It is affectionately known as Cully.

=== Roman period ===
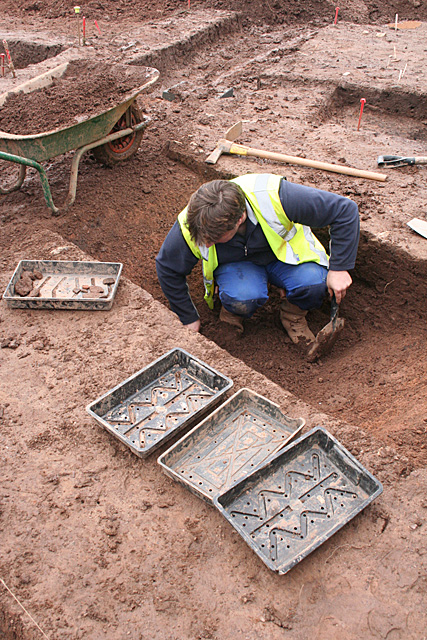
Excavations on site near Shortlands lane

On St Andrew's Hill, to the north-west of Cullompton town centre, two Roman forts were discovered in 1984 by aerial photography carried out for Devon County Council. The earlier, smaller fort (the boundary ditches of which showed up in cropmarks) was later replaced by a second, larger fort. The ramparts of this second fort are preserved on two sides as modern field boundaries with substantial earthen banks with hedges on top. The banks on the other two sides were removed shortly before the site was recognised as Roman. The site was made a scheduled monument in 1986. The aerial photography also revealed two subsidiary military enclosures or annexes to each fort. In 1992 a geophysical survey was made of the fort and areas to the east and west and this was followed by a trial excavation to the west of the site. These confirmed the existence of two forts, and the ditch of the second fort was excavated. Pottery from the site was dated from around 50–70 AD, which is consistent with a previous date of before 75 AD based on finds from fieldwalking. A Roman settlement near Shortlands Lane was excavated in 2009. A large quantity of Roman pottery, burial remains and fragments of hypocaust tile from the second and third century was found.

=== Saxon period and middle ages ===
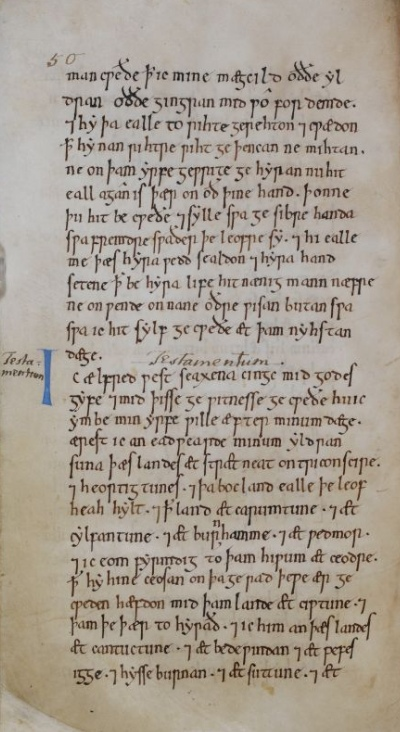
Will of Alfred the Great, AD 873–888, mentions Columtune (11th-century copy, British Library Stowe MS 944, ff. 29v–33r)

Saxon settlers moved into the Culm Valley in the seventh century and Cullompton was made the site of a minster. In 872 Alfred the Great bequeathed Columtune and its lands to his son Æthelweard. At the time of the Norman Conquest, it was held by the Lady Gytha Thorkelsdóttir, the widow of Godwin, Earl of Wessex and mother of King Harold II. In 1067 William the Conqueror passed through the villa of Colitona on his way to besiege Exeter where Gytha was living. In 1087 William the Conqueror gave the manor to Baldwin, his wife's favourite nephew. It was subsequently held by the Earl of Devon for many years until in 1278 Amicia Countess of Devon willed it to the Abbot and Convent of Buckland Monachorum. With the Dissolution of the Monasteries it was sold to Sir John St Ledger. The five prebends of Cullompton (Colebrook, Hineland, Wiever, Esse, Upton) were presented by William the Conqueror to Battle Abbey in Sussex and were later held by St Nicholas Priory, Exeter. In 1536 St Nicholas Priory was dissolved and the last Prior gained appointment as the Vicar of Cullompton. Patronage then passed to the More family of Moorehays.

In 1278 the town was granted its first market to be held on a Thursday. In 1356 the town gained its first water supply by a deed of gift of the Abbot of Buckland. The water (known as the Town Lake or watercourse) came from a stream rising at Coombe Farm and flowed into a pond near Shortlands. From there it flowed in several open channels to all parts of the town. Water bailiffs were employed to protect the interests of the town and a tradition of "possessioning" took place. This was a ceremony that took place every seven years where a group of townsfolk would inspect the channel and ensure that it was not being abused. The first recorded possessioning was in 1716. In the mid-nineteenth century the water courses were used for boiling vegetables, surface drainage and emptying cesspools. A Board of Health Inspector in 1854 concluded that "typhus and other epidemic diseases are so prevalent here more so than in any other parish in the Union". They were eventually only used to keep the streets clean and continued to flow until 1962 when the town council decided that they were not willing to pay for their upkeep.

=== English Civil War to the eighteenth century ===
In August 1642, during the English Civil War Mr Ashford and Richard Culme – then Sheriff of Devon attempted to have their Commission of array read in Cullompton, but were opposed by the local parish constable, Walter Challs, and by the people of the town. As well as raising troops for the Royalists, the commission would also have halted a scheduled muster of the local militia. Despite the support of local landowners such as John Acland, who was another of the Commissioners of the Array, this strong local opposition meant that Culme and Ashford failed. Later, the Royalist Earl of Bath came with cavaliers to try and support Ashford, but the locals responded by throwing up chains and preparing their militia.

Troops passed through Cullompton on several occasions during the civil war: Sir Ralph Hopton rode with a small troop through the town on his way to Cornwall; Cornish Royalist forces marched through Cullompton on their way to join Prince Maurice at Chard as did the Earl of Essex and Thomas Fairfax. There were troops on the streets of Cullompton again in 1655 during the Penruddock uprising.

The first Nonconformist congregation began in 1662 when the vicar of Cullompton, Revd William Crompton, was ejected from the established church. He continued to preach and a Protestant Dissenters meeting house was built in 1698 which became the Unitarian Chapel. In the eighteenth century there was a prevalence of Dissent with the local vicar recording in 1736 that of a population of 3358 there were 508 Presbyterians, 133 Anabaptists and 87 Quakers. By 1743 the first Baptist Chapel had been built. John Wesley's journal records preaching near the town in 1748 and on numerous occasions until 1789.

In 1678 a local innkeeper, John Barnes was hanged after being found guilty of highway robbery. He had waylaid, with the help of accomplices, a coach travelling from Exeter to London and made off with about £600 but he was recognised by the guards from Exeter, where he had been a taverner.

Another local man called Tom Austin was hanged in August 1694. He inherited a farm with an annual income of £80 and then married the daughter of a neighbouring farmer with a dowry of £800. He lived an extravagant lifestyle and spent all of his money. His farm, having been neglected could not provide sufficient income for him and he borrowed a lot of money from neighbours and friends. He then turned to highway robbery and was moderately successful for a time. He shot Sir Zachary Wilmott during a robbery on the road between Wellington and Taunton in Somerset. The proceeds from his crimes supported him for a time but in the long term he was unable to clear his debts. In 1694, following a row with his wife, he went to visit his uncle. His uncle was not at home and he killed his aunt and her five children and took around £60 from the house. On returning home he was asked about the bloodstains on his clothes by his wife. He then killed her and his two children. His uncle, who dropped in to visit him on his way home, knocked Austin unconscious and he was arrested and later hanged at Exeter Jail.

The Cullompton Company of Volunteers (a voluntary body of soldiers) was first raised in 1794 and continued until 1810. The volunteer companies were formed following Britain's entry into the French Revolutionary Wars and continued to exist during the Napoleonic Wars. Cullompton was the first inland town to offer to raise a volunteer company (on 16 May 1794) and on 24 June the volunteers were accepted. The first commander, Captain Jarmin, was a former Marine officer. The company was formed into a battalion with 11 other volunteer companies called the Hayridge (later Highbridge) regiment. It had 1,200 men and three companies were based in Cullompton with a barracks in New Cut. Jarmin died in 1794 and was succeeded by Henry Skinner. In 1801 the company became a cavalry troop and was then disbanded only to be reformed in 1805 when hostilities with France had resumed. Many Cullompton men fought in the Peninsular War and at the Battle of Waterloo.

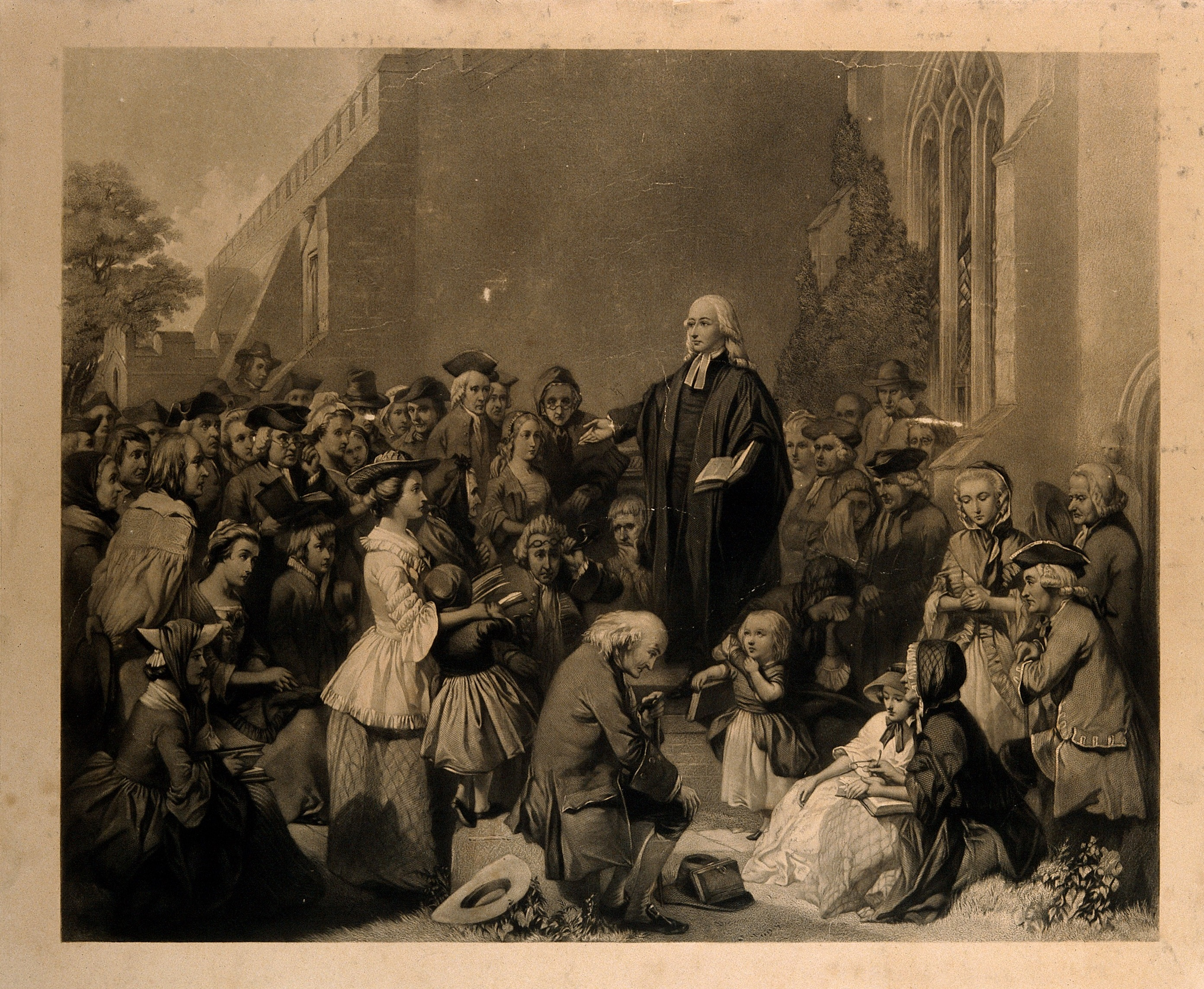
John Wesley preached in Cullompton on several occasions.

=== Nineteenth century to present ===
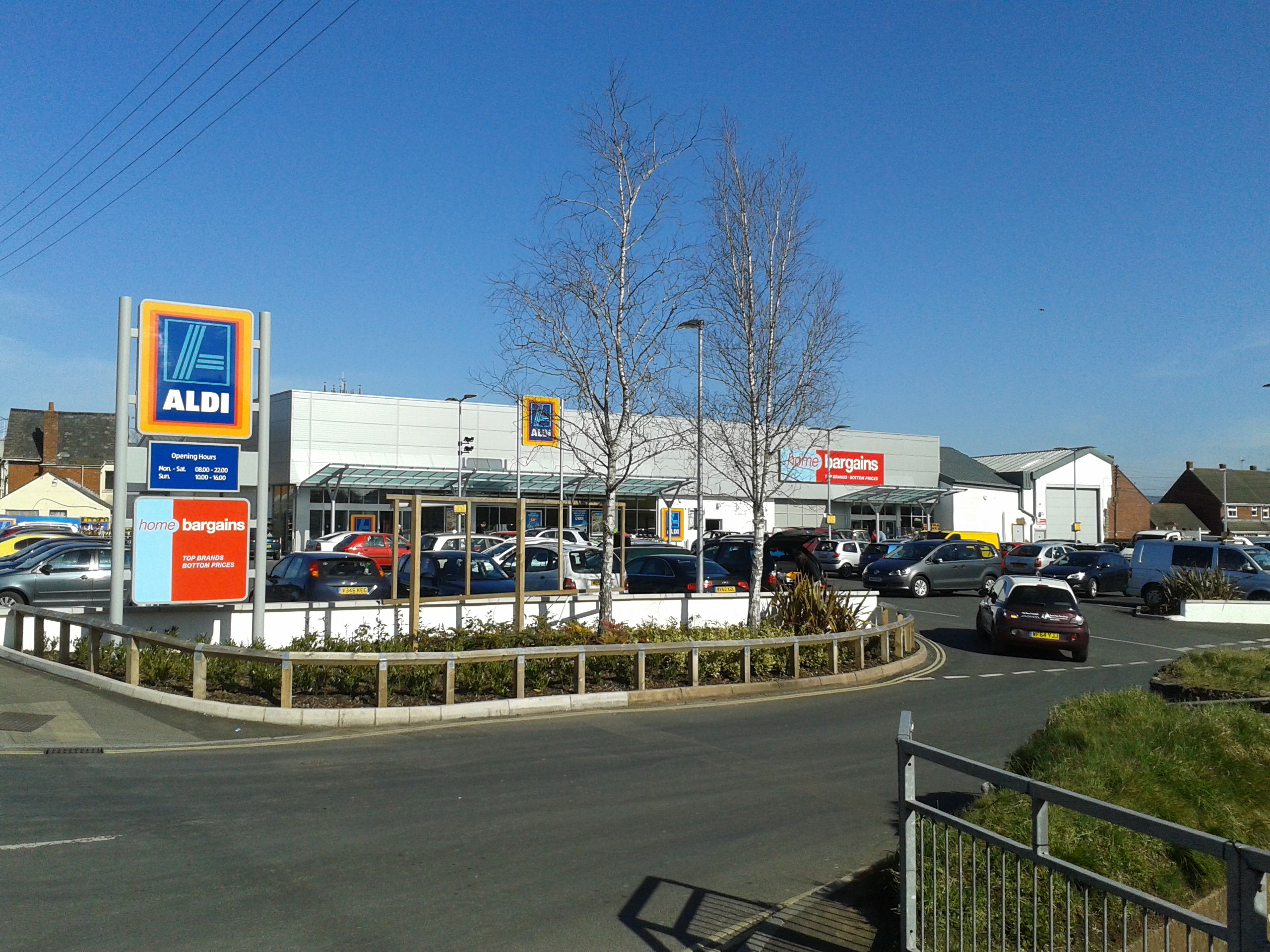
These two shops are on the site of the former tannery owned by the Selwood family.

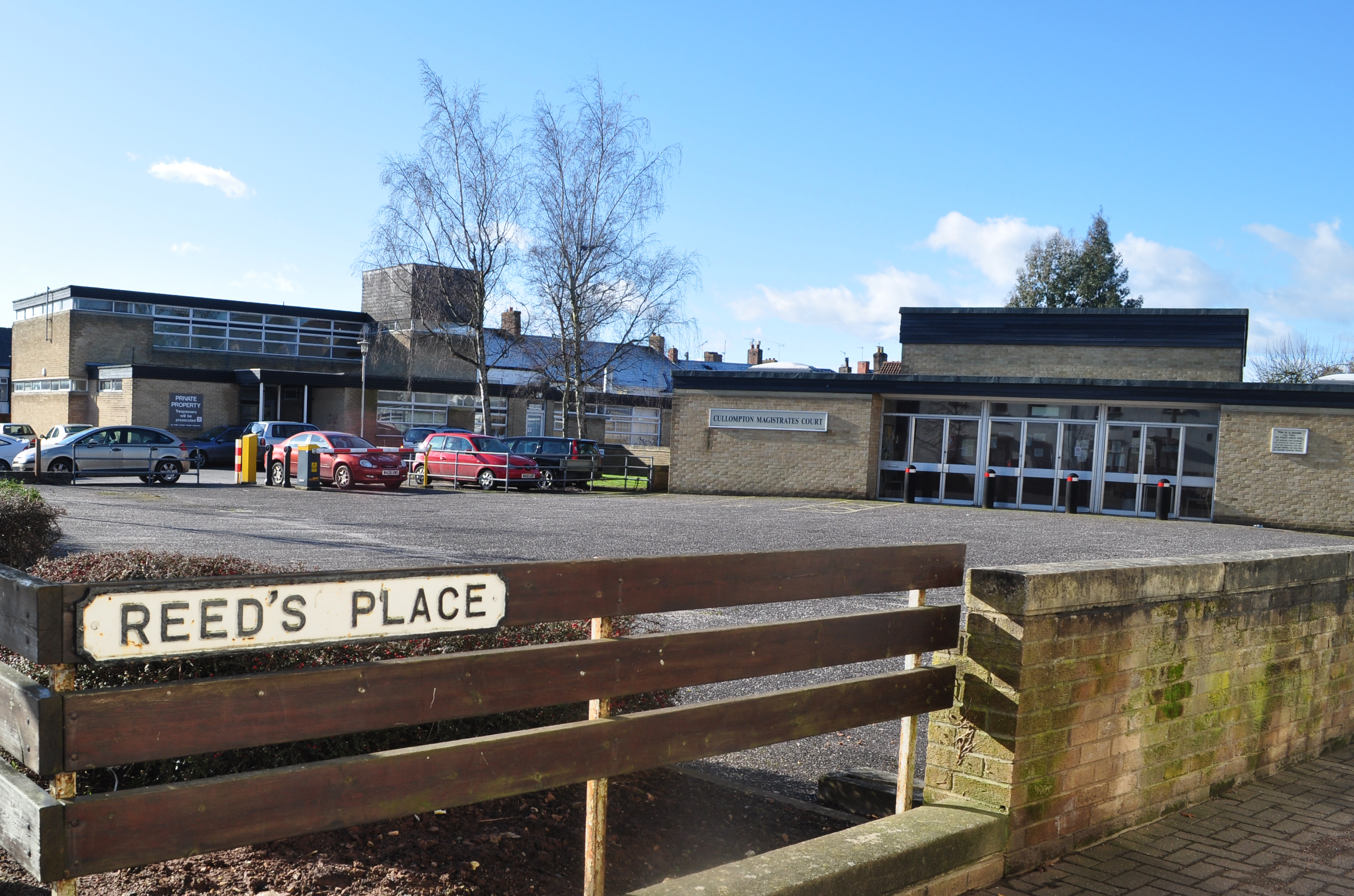
The former health centre and magistrates' court

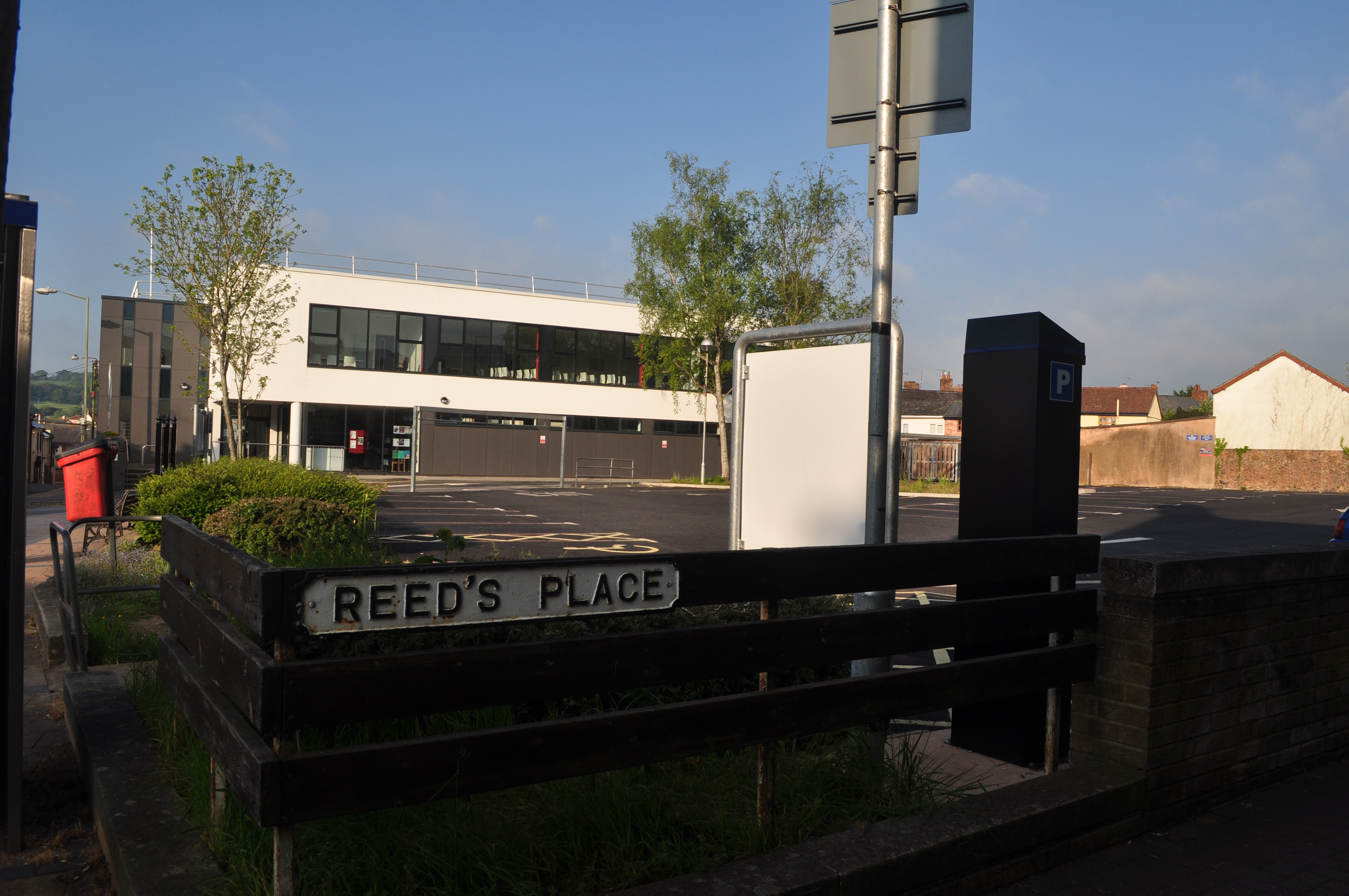
The Hayridge Centre and car park on the site of the former health centre and magistrates' court.

In 1805 or 1806 the last bull-baiting in the town took place. On 7 July 1839, a severe fire destroyed many houses in Cullompton. About two thirds of the town burnt with 145 houses and other buildings being destroyed. A subscription for rebuilding was set and donations of £5 were made by Barne and Son, tanners of Tiverton, and Cullompton tanners Mortimore and Selwood. In 1847 a riot occurred in the town due to the high price of wheat. Three houses were attacked, including one in Pound Square belonging to Mr Selwood, the owner of a local tannery and also a maltster. He was accused of speculatively buying 2000 bushels of corn and when his house was attacked, almost all the windows were broken and his furniture was also damaged.

There have been police stations in the town since 1857, when the first Police Station was rented. It had three cells and a petty session courtroom. A new police station was built in 1974, which underwent a major refurbishment in 2011, to become a police force hub for Mid Devon, with 72 staff members. The town acquired its first steam-driven fire engine in 1914 which cost £100 and was paid for by voluntary subscription.

In April 1903 a petition objecting to the renewal of alcohol licences for local inns, signed by 450 people, was presented to the brewsters sessions (magistrates' court meetings in England where pub licences were renewed or granted). A deputation sent to the session explained that the number of licensed houses was too large in proportion to the population. In 1917, the cattle market moved from the Higher Bullring to a field near the station. The first cinema was opened in the Victoria Hall in 1918 by Bill Terry and in 1977 the town was twinned with Ploudalmézeau in Brittany, France.

In 1920, a public company was formed to provide an electricity supply for Cullompton which merged with the Bradninch Electricity Company in 1927 to form the Culm Valley Electricity Supply Co. Ltd. A gasworks was set up in Cullompton in 1865 for the Cullompton Gas Light and Coke Co. This was taken over by the Devon Gas Association and nationalised in 1949. The gasworks was closed in 1956 and Cullompton was then supplied from Exeter.

Another serious fire occurred on 17 October 1958, when Selwood's tannery in Exeter Street was gutted by fire; the site was subsequently used by a series of supermarkets. It was run as a Gateway store and then as a Somerfield before closing in 2010. Aldi re-opened on the site in April 2014 following a major refurbishment of the store.

The town saw a major expansion in the 1970s as the construction of a bypass in 1969, and its conversion into part of the M5 in 1974, made it a popular commuter town, and it continued to expand during the closing years of the 20th century and the first few years of the 21st century. The Mid Devon Local Development Framework Proposals include plans to erect 95 new dwellings a year, and to build 4,000 square metres (43,000 sq ft) of new employment floorspace a year between the start of the plan and 2026. The first Cullompton town website was set up in 1998 and a new website was created in 2011. CCTV was installed in the main street in 2000.

In March 2010, it was announced that the town's magistrates' court was to be closed due its poor facilities and lack of rooms. It had been suggested that the site might be developed as a town hall or the site used as a car park. but this plan was prevented when a group formed to oppose the proposal to purchase the site for a new town hall were elected to two thirds of the council seats in May 2011. In June 2011, it was announced that two local businesspeople had purchased the site and the building was demolished in March 2012 to make space for a car park.

The town got its first permanent library in 1938 in a building on Exeter Hill. In September 2011, a new library opened on a new site, which was four times the size of the old one and cost three million pounds. This was followed shortly afterwards, in December 2011, by the opening of the Cullompton Community Centre, costing 1.5 million pounds. The Tiverton Dramatic Society used the new venue to stage the first pantomime to be performed in Cullompton for 20 years.

=== Historic estates ===
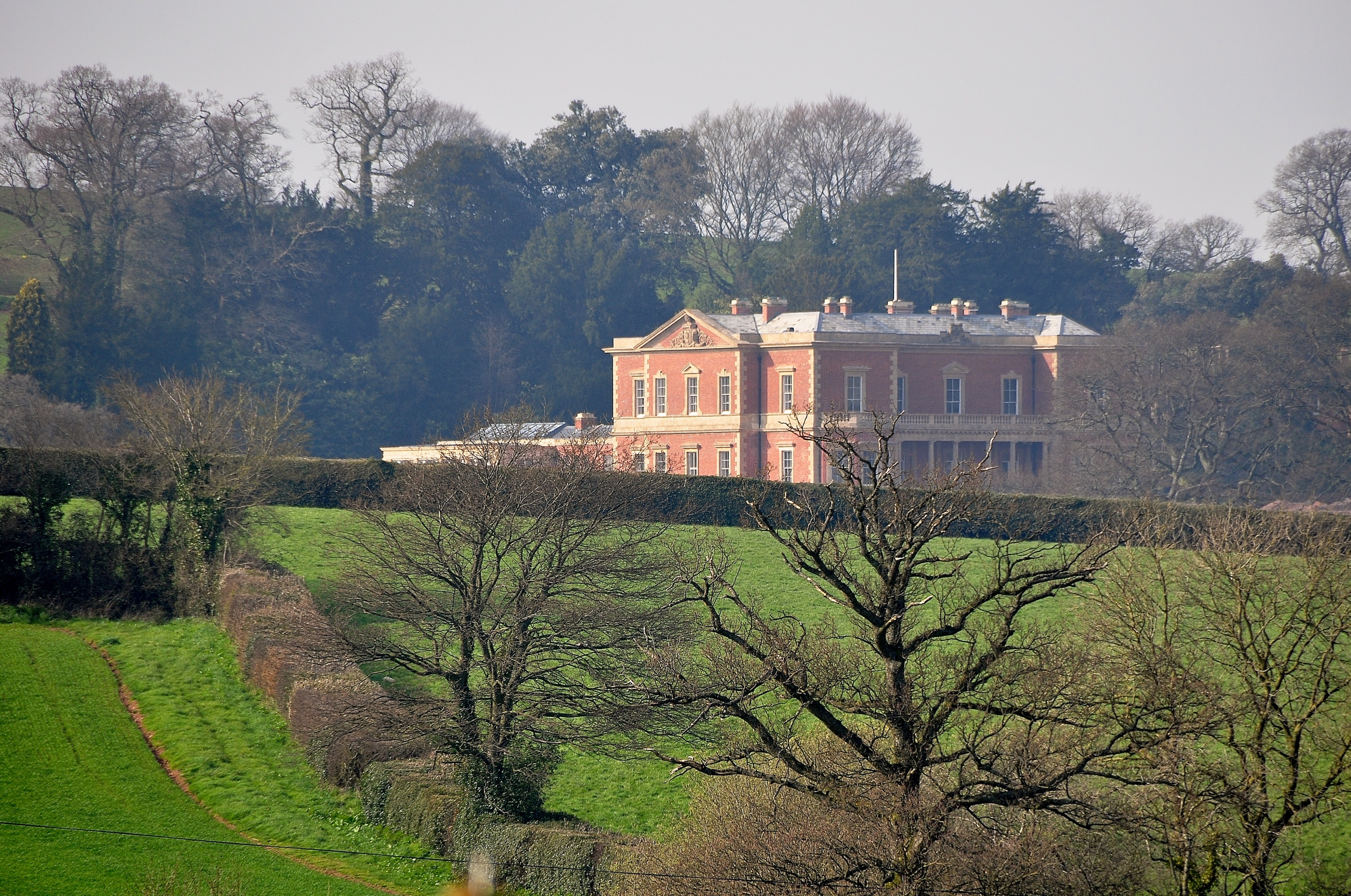
Hillersdon House

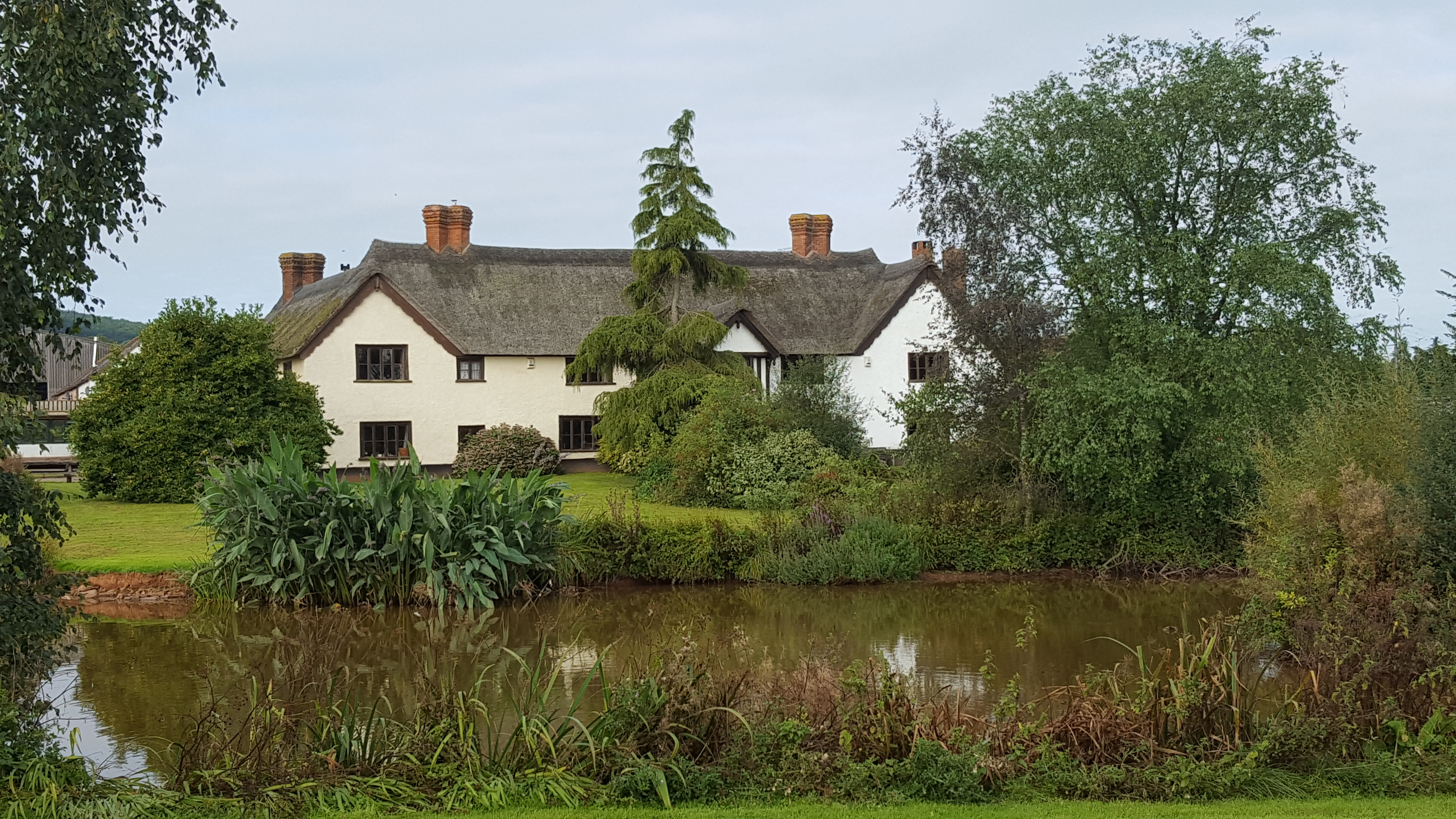
Langford Court, a grade II* listed building

Within the parish of Cullompton are situated various historic estates including:

- The church of Cullompton and its land was given to Battle Abbey by William the Conqueror. The manor contained five sub-manors called Upton, Weaver, Ash, Colebrook and Henland (now in the parish of Kentisbeare). This manor later passed to St Nicholas Priory in Exeter.
- Cullompton. At the time of the Domesday Book in 1086, this manor was part of the royal manor of Silverton and so not recorded separately. Before the conquest it was held by King Edward. In 1291 this manor was given to Buckland Abbey by Isabella Countess of Devon.
- Padbrook and Newland were also smaller parts of Silverton in Domesday.
- Colebrook was also a Domesday manor. William Cheever was the tenant-in-chief and it was held by Manfred. Alward held it before 1066. It was given to Ford Abbey by Henry de Tracey.
- Hillersdon, was held by Sherwold before 1066. Reginald held it from Odo FitzGamelin at the time of Domesday and was later held of the Honour of Torrington.
- Two manors named Ponsford were recorded in the Domesday Book and were both held by William from Baldwin the Sheriff. Before 1066, one of the manors was held by Sidwin and one by Edwin.
- Langford was also held from Baldwin by Rainer at the time of Domesday. The manor was previously held by Brictmer. Along with Ponsford it later formed part of the Honour of Okehampton and was held by the Courtneys.
- There are two estates named Aller in the Domesday Book. One of these lay within the Parish of Cullompton and was held by Ralph Pagnell. Within the manor were Whitheathfield and an unidentified place named Frieland. Bolealler may have also been part of this manor. Along with Kerswell, Aller was granted to Montacute Priory by Matilda Peverel and a cell was established at Kerswell Priory.
- Moor Hayes, for many centuries the seat of the prominent Moor (alias Moore) family, which was responsible for the Moore Chantry / Moor Hayes Chapel at the east end of the north aisle of Cullompton Church.

=== Economic history ===
Cullompton has a long history of manufacturing, first with wool and cloth manufacture, and then later with leather working and light industry.

==== Cloth trade ====
In the 15th century the weaving of fine kersies and later serges was introduced to the area by weavers from the continent. This was largely a cottage industry and merchants would have premises where the fleeces would be combed and sorted. John Lane was one of the best known local cloth merchants (see Lane's Aisle in the section on St Andrew's church below). In the seventeenth century, Higher and Lower King's Mills were fulling mills for the local industry. In 1816 Mr Upcott employed 60 weavers and 'many spinners'. The Wellington based firm Fox Brothers had a branch factory built in 1890 and made high quality woolen and worsted cloth until 1977. During World War I, their entire output was of khaki cloth, employing over 200 people. In 1910 Mrs Gidley, wife of Dr Gustavus Gidley, set up a hand-weaving enterprise in the stables of Heyford House with the aim of giving employment to ex-servicemen and disabled people. To manage it she appointed two women, one a granddaughter of Bishop Phillpotts. Later the business evolved into machine knitted garments.

==== Mills powered by the town leat ====
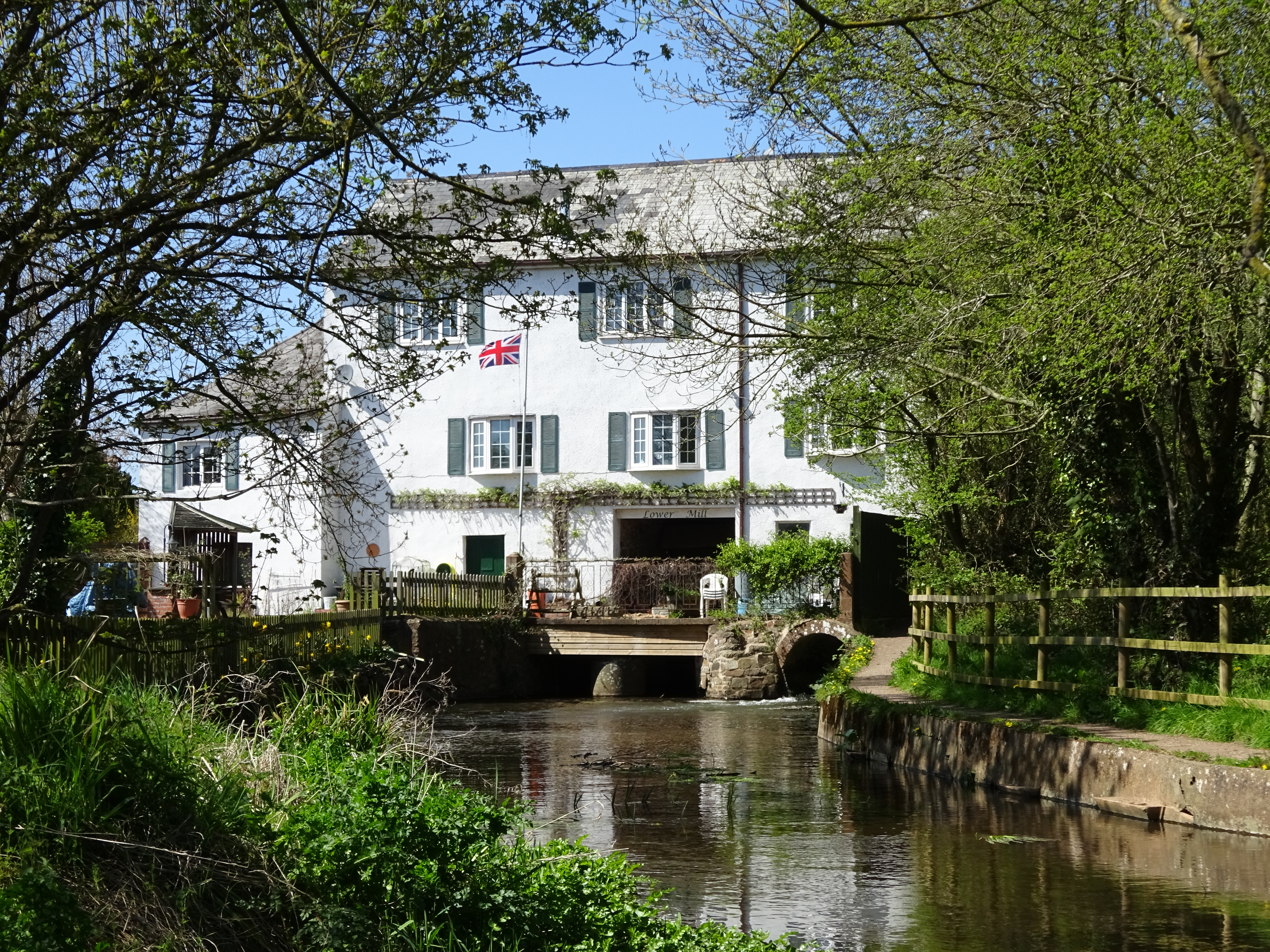
Lower Mill as it is today

A leat runs to the east of the town's main street but it is uncertain when it was first constructed. By the early seventeenth century, the southern end of the leat and one mill are shown on a map. There were three main mills: Higher Mill, Lower Mill and Middle Mill. Higher Mill appears to have always been a corn mill and it continued to produce animal feed until 1974. It has since been converted to housing but a water turbine remains. Middle Mill was used as a woollen mill in the nineteenth century and was also associated with Bilbie's bell foundry (see below). Around 1900, the mill was steam powered and had a boiler delivered. It is labelled as an axle works on the 1904 Second Edition Ordnance Survey map. The only remains of Middle Mill are some walls and a chimney base. Lower Mill ceased working in 1968. The building is now in residential use but the sluices (made by Stenner and Gunn of the Lowman Ironworks, Tiverton) can still be seen, as can the water wheel and gearing.

==== Tanning ====
Tanning in Cullompton goes back to at least the sixteenth century and in the nineteenth century there were three tanneries: Crow Green, Lower King's Mill and Court Tannery. The tannery at Higher King's Mill was active between about 1830 and 1875 and employed 12 labourers in 1851 and 9 a decade later. Court Tannery was established by 1871 and had closed by 1906. It was located at the north end of the town behind Court House, which was the residence of the owners of the tannery. In 1871 it employed 21 men and was probably steam-powered. A local tanner, James Whitby, along with George Bodley and John Davis patented an improved bark mill (used to grind bark for producing tanbark used in the tanning process).

The Crow Green tannery was situated at the south-west end of the town and was already in existence in 1816. It had a water-powered bark mill and 47 tan pits at that date. It was owned by the Selwood family for much of the 19th and 20th centuries, who probably purchased it from James Whitby around 1830, and it was often referred to as Selwood's tannery. It suffered from fires in 1831, 1867 and 1958. In 1881 it employed 48 people and over 100 in 1958 (8% of the local workforce at the time). One of the major products of the factory in the nineteenth century was high-quality sole leather, but during the Second World War, only poor-quality hides, such as buffalo, were allocated to the firm. The business was badly damaged by the invention of rubber stick-on shoe soles which reduced the demand for sole leather from shoe repairers. It finally finished operation in 1967 when the leather side of the business was sold to a Yorkshire firm.

The building to the north-west of Exeter Hill, which formerly housed the water-powered bark mill, is now an antiques warehouse and the remains of the leat and tail race can still be seen. This side of the site was also the location of the lime yard. The other half of the site, to the south-east of Exeter Hill, which was the location of the tan yard, is now the site of an Aldi supermarket.

In addition to tanning, the leather industry included a leather dressing works (founded in 1921 and which closed in 1982) and a glove maker, Drevon and Brown.

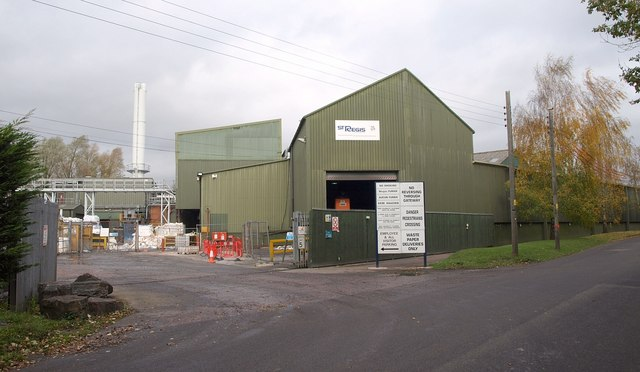
Higher Kingsmill in 2010

==== Paper making ====
The first paper mill in Cullompton dates from 1729, with mills being set up near by at Hele and Higher Kensham in 1767, at Lower Kensham c1788 and Langford c 1788. These would have been small water-powered vat mills, where paper was made by hand, generally by women and children. Records show that the mill in Cullompton was owned by a Mr Simon Mills in 1757 and was taken over by a Mr Theodore Dart in 1799. There followed a number of different owners of whom one of the most significant was Albert Reed who purchased the mill in 1883. His brother, William Reed, established a partnership with a Mr C King Smith. The Reed & Smith group (which acquired New Taplow Mill in 1950) became one of the biggest papermakers in the UK. A Fourdrinier machine was installed in 1892 and continued to make paper at Higher Kings until about 1972. A new machine was built in 1956 to make blue sugar bags and other products, and has been modified over the years to make different grades of paper and card. St Regis acquired Higher Kings in the early 1980s and since then the mill has diversified into making a wide range of recycled coloured papers and card. It is now owned by Asia File Corporation.

==== Cabinet making ====
Luxtons cabinet makers was founded in 1800 and grew until it employed 50 people, with workshops at Cockpit Hill and Duke Street. After World War I a retail shop was opened by the firm in Fore Street and it kept going doing retailing and repairs until the mid-1960s.

A former employee of Luxtons, William Broom, started his own cabinet making business in 1920 and employed 7 or 8 workmen until the 1930s when the Great Depression meant that by the start of the Second World War, William Broom was the only worker in the firm. After the war, the firm concentrated on repair work and antiques restoration. The firm closed in 1990 with the retirement of Sid Russ who had taken the firm over after William Broom retired.

==== Haulage ====
Mark Whitton founded Whitton's in the early 1900s carrying timber with a horse and cart. After World War I the company carried coal to the gas works and local paper mills. In 1923 they bought their first Sentinel steam lorry and carried paper to Bristol, returning with animal feed. During the Second World War they were run by the Ministry of Transport and after the war were nationalised to become part of British Road Services. The brothers who had owned the company moved back into haulage, setting up a new firm which went into receivership in the 1970s and was then bought by Wild Transport of Exeter in 1973.

==== Bell foundry and clock making ====
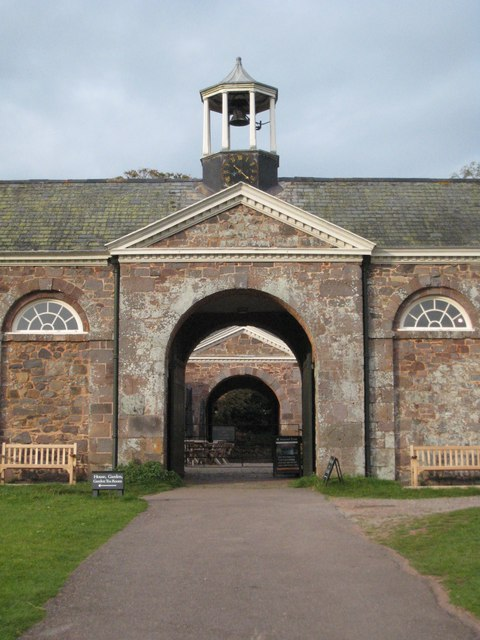
The bell in the stable block at Killerton was made by Thomas Castleman Bilbie in 1782.

A Cullompton man called Chubb travelled widely to repair bells during the reign of James I. In 1745 a vestry meeting determined that in order to reduce the cost of having the church bells repaired, the bells should be cast in some part of the almshouses, and a bell founder be found to work there. In 1746 Thomas Bilbie, from Chew Stoke in Somerset, created a new bell foundry (The West of England Church Bellfoundry) in the town, paying an annual rent of £1/13/4 (£1.67) for premises in the Almshouse building. He recast the six bells of Cullompton church as eight new ones. In 1754 Thomas's eldest son also called Thomas moved to Cullompton to take over the bell foundry. Over a period of 26 years he cast 239 bells, the majority for churches in Devon. When he died, aged 53 in 1780, his son Thomas Castleman Bilbie took over the business and cast 197 bells from 1780 to 1813. The business was then sold to Pannell and Co. who moved it to Exeter in 1850. St Michael's and All Angel's in Alphington has a peal of 8 bells cast by Bilbie in Cullompton, at a cost of £108 12 shillings and 8 pence (£1.63) in 1749. The bell in the Chapel at Killerton House was made by W. Pannell and Son in 1845.

The Bilbie family were also involved in clock making. In 1749 Thomas Biblie (senior) was asked to make a set of chimes for Cullompton church. Thomas II worked on clock mechanisms to play tunes on church bells at East Coker and also at Beaminster. Thomas Castleman is recorded as having made a clock for Cullompton Church in 1811 at a cost of £55.

==== Other industries ====
There was also a jam factory, 'Devon Dale Jam' in the 1930s and a foundry.

== Governance ==
The town and civil parish of Cullompton has three wards: North (6 councillors), South (7 councillors) and Outer (2 councillors). The town council first met on 1 December 1894 when it took over from the Parochial Committee, and since 1995 the town has had a mayor elected by the councillors, The current Mayor since 2022 is Councillor James Buczkowski. It is part of Mid Devon District Council and there are three Cullompton wards in the district council North (2 councillors), South (2 councillors) and Outer (1 councillor). The total population of the wards at the 2011 Census was 9,835. It is also part of Devon County Council and is represented through the Cullompton Rural ward.

From Saxon times it was part of the hundred of Hayridge. From 1894 to 1935 it was part of Tiverton Rural District and prior to that it was part of Tiverton Sanitary District and Tiverton Poor Law Union. It may have been a borough in the 17th century but this status was not sustained.

It is part of the Honiton and Sidmouth constituency and its MP since the 2024 United Kingdom general election is Richard Foord. It was formerly part of the Northern Parliamentary Division of Devon (1832–1885), the Honiton Division (1885-1997), and the Tiverton and Honiton constituency (1997-2024).

== Geography ==
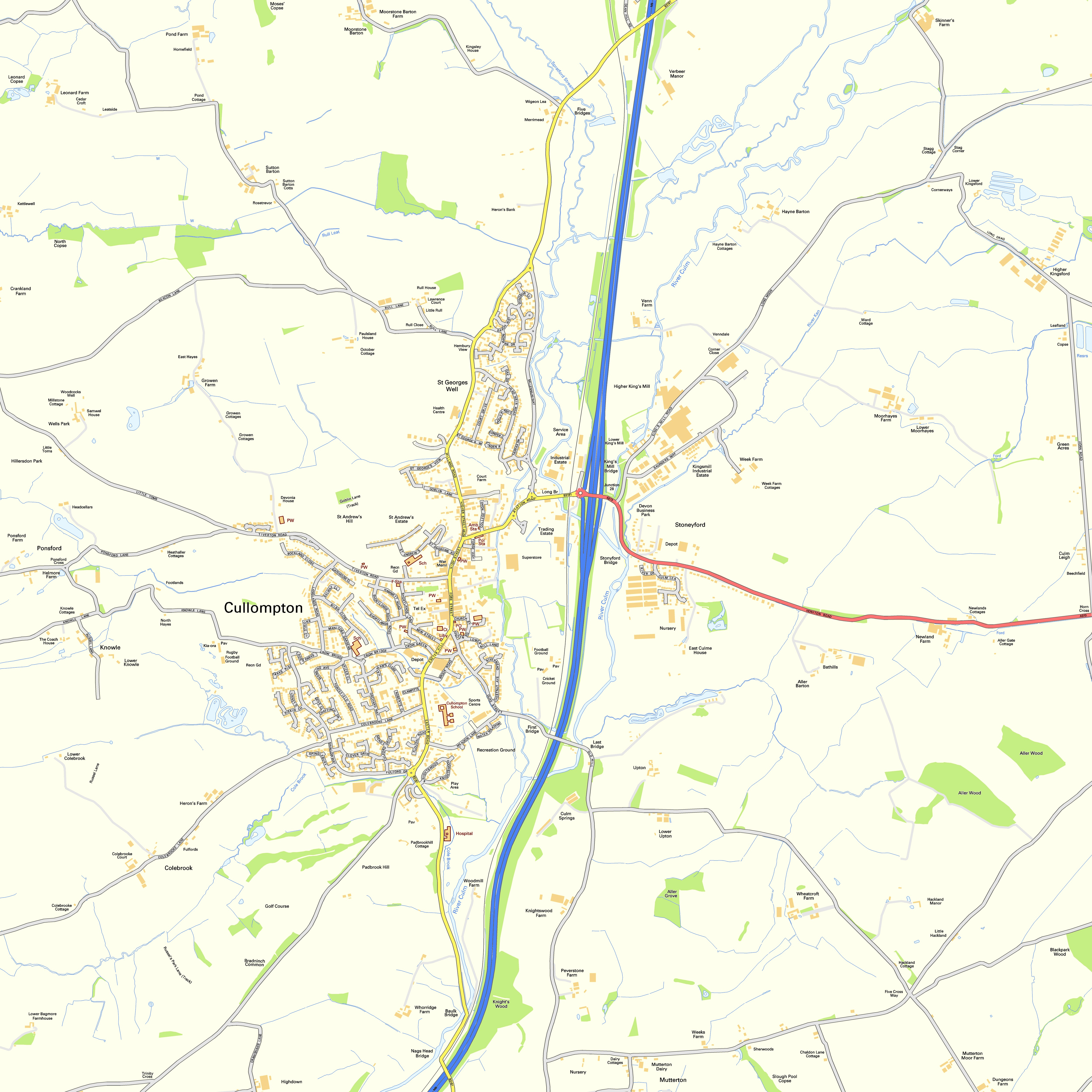
Ordnance Survey street view of Cullompton

Cullompton is 4 miles (6.4 km) south-east of Tiverton, 13 miles (21 km) north-north-east of Exeter and 149 miles (240 km) west-south-west of London. It is at about 70 m above sea level. The parish covers nearly 8,000 acres (32 km^{2}) and stretches for 7 miles (11 km) along the Culm valley.

== Demography ==
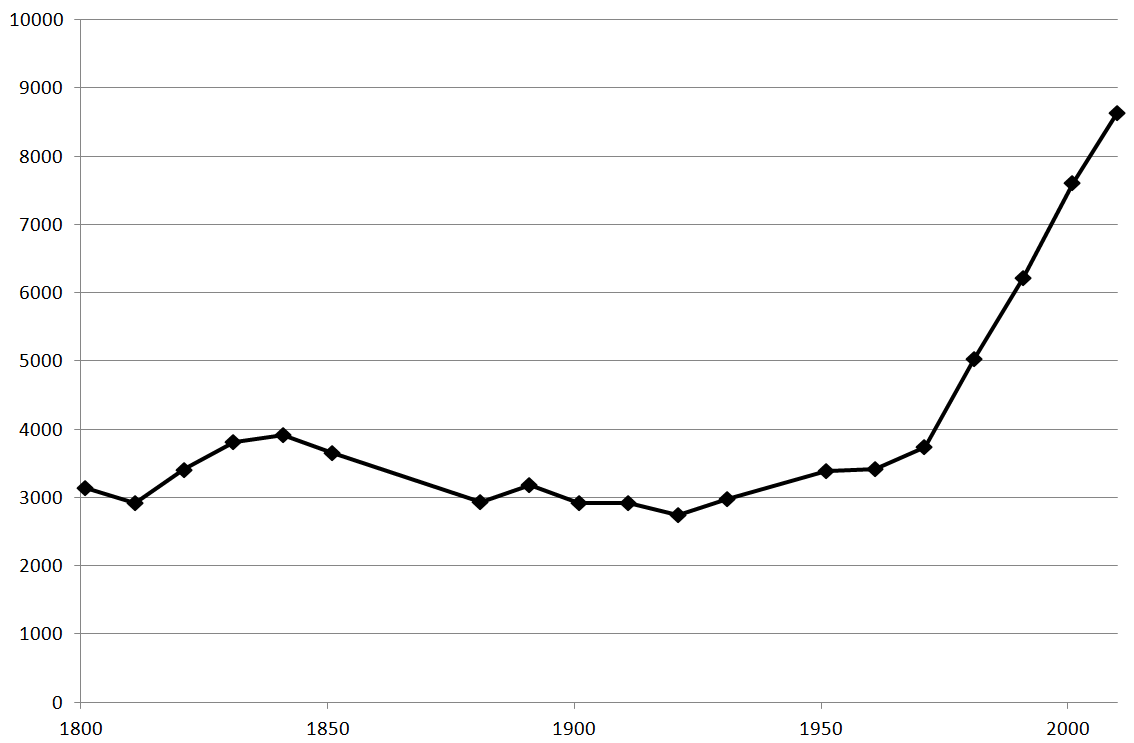
Population of Cullompton Parish 1801–2010

At the 2011 Census the parish of Cullompton had a population of 8,499. The wards of Cullompton North and Cullompton South contain the urban area and had a combined population of 7,643.

In 2011 there were 6,153 people aged 16 to 74 living in the parish. 4,591 were economically active of whom 177 were unemployed and 1,562 were economically inactive of whom 867 were retired. Figures in 2011 on ethnic composition for Cullompton were: White English/Welsh/Scottish/Northern Irish/British 94.2%, White other 3.6% and White Irish 0.3%. The parish's religious composition was 61.8% Christian, 28.7% no religion and 8.5% religion not stated.

=== Population trends ===
In 1660 the population of the town (only including the urban parts of the parish) has been estimated at 1,800, which made it the 10th largest town in Devon and Cornwall. The town's population grew to 2,750 by 1750 (meaning it was the 8th largest town) but it then fell rapidly so that it was only 2,275 by 1805 – only the 23rd largest town in Devon and Cornwall. This fall in population, in a period when many other towns grew rapidly, was probably due to the decline in the importance of the cloth trade in this period. The population of the parish changed little from the start of the 19th century until the 1970s, remaining at around 3,000 (see chart). However it increased rapidly in the last part of the 20th century and the start of the 21st. Cullompton's population growth looks set to continue as Mid Devon's core strategy foresees 95 new dwellings being built per year in the period to 2026.

== Economy ==
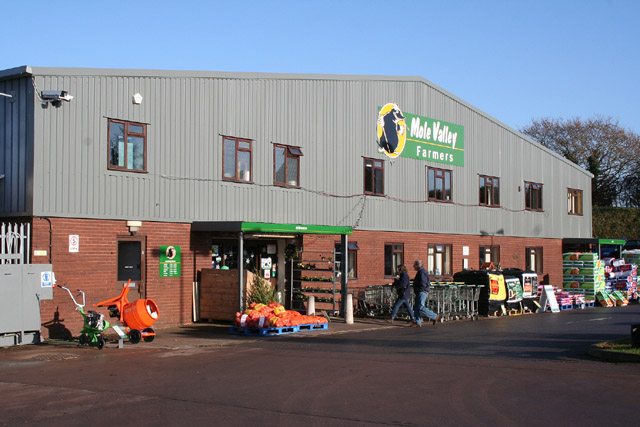
Mole Valley Farmers, Cullompton

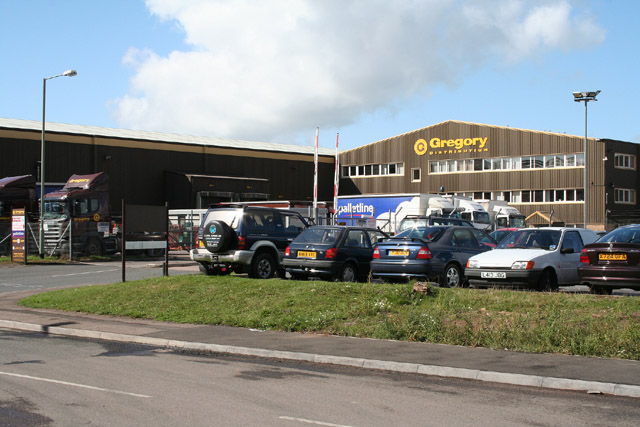
Kingsmill industrial estate

In 2001 the proportion of people living and working in Cullompton was 43% with 19% of the town's working population employed in Exeter.

=== Retail ===
In 2001 the retail sector in Cullompton met fairly local needs only. The town currently has two supermarkets, Tesco, which opened in September 2008 and Aldi which opened in April 2014. Mole Valley Farmers has a store in the town which sells a wide range of goods including farm requirements, garden supplies and hardware.

The Cullompton street market came to an end in the late 1950s but it was revived for a trial period of seven weeks starting on Saturday 28 June 2008. Although in the initial few weeks trading was good, overall takings for the traders were disappointing. The town also has an indoor market in Cullompton Town Hall every Wednesday.

A farmers' market held in Cullompton is the oldest event of its kind in the South West. It was Tracey Frankpitt's idea, and after much work, the first market was held on 13 June 1998. She was later consulted by the producers of the long running radio soap opera The Archers and the Cullompton farmers' market was mentioned in one of the episodes. It is held monthly on the second Saturday of the month.

There is an active traders group (Cullompton Traders Association) which holds a range of events. The Bullring Market has been relaunched since Dec 2012 and continues into 2013 every Wednesday and Saturday.

=== Kingsmill industrial estate ===
Mid Devon District Council owns 11 industrial units at the Kingsmill industrial estate which are let by a variety of businesses. Business based on the estate include Gregory Distribution, who have 27,000 square feet (2,500 m^{2}) of temperature controlled storage which they use for a contract to deliver chilled and frozen goods to Spar stores in the southwest. There is also a flour mill, milk depot, marketing and advertising agency and an industrial clothing shop as well as Higher Kings Mill.

== Culture and community ==
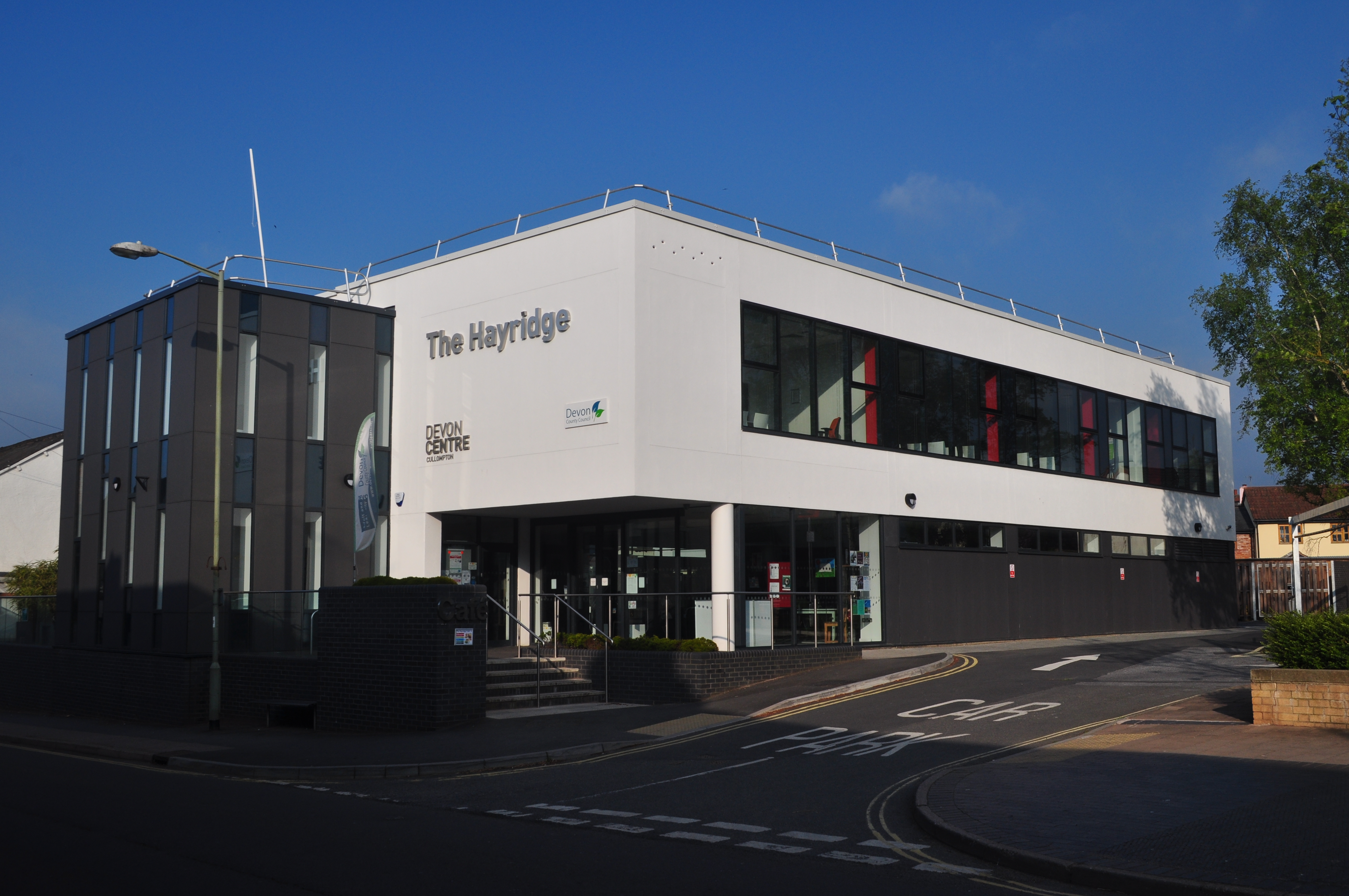
The Hayridge Centre in Cullompton which contains the library and also the adult learning services.

The town has an annual Christmas parade to celebrate the switching on of the town's Christmas lights and a festival week in the summer which includes the annual town fayre (formerly known as the Cullompton Town Picnic and Classic Car Show).

Community facilities improved during 2011, with the completion of two projects. The first was a 'community hub' called 'The Hayridge', which opened in September. The facility, which is open six days a week, has a public lending library and cafe with free Wi-Fi access, IT suites and conference facilities. The office space is used by Cullompton Adult Community Learning which was previously based at the local secondary school. Cullompton Adult Community Learning is run by Devon County Council and offers a range of courses for adult learners ranging from Indian Head Massage to French for Beginners. Courses are run in the Hayridge's learning suites on the first floor. The second major project completed in 2011 was the Cullompton Community centre, which opened in December. This is a 9,250-square-foot (859 m^{2}) building created for community use with sponsorship from St Andrew's church and with grants from Devon County Council and Uffculme Environmental Fund, donations from church members, and money from the South West of England Regional Development Agency. The main meeting area has seating capacity for 180 people, and there are five further meeting rooms as well as offices, kitchens and toilets.

A major recreational area for the town is the Cullompton Community Association's fields which cover 32 acres (13 ha) in the centre of the town. The fields are used for a variety of events, which include a circus, whippet racing and a firework display. The Association is a registered charity which was formed in 1970 to provide a recreation area for the town. It purchased the fields, which are next to the riverside walk along the leat, for £11,500. The site was chosen as the water meadows needed to be maintained to help prevent flooding and it was also close to the cricket and bowling clubs. Youth activities have been provided by a youth centre called the John Tallack Centre since it opened in 1988.

In February 2008 the Culm Valley Integrated Centre for Health opened in Cullompton. The services provided at the site include: the College Surgery Partnership which is a large general practice with ten doctors; complementary therapies provided by Culm Valley Natural Health; self care groups a health food café, a physic garden and a pharmacy run by Alliance Boots. Health care is also provided by the Brain Injury Rehabilitation Trust, which has run a residential centre called 'The Woodmill' since May 1998. It is the most southerly residential assessment and rehabilitation centre run by the Trust in the United Kingdom, and provides rehabilitation for up to 23 adults with acquired brain injury.

Cullompton United Charities provides a number of charitable services to residents of Cullompton. The majority of the funds come from bequests made to the parish from the seventeenth century onwards. Thirteen separate charities were combined in 1921 and then in 1953 further amalgamation went on with the Trott's almshouses, John Lanes Charity and the Charity of George Spicer combining to form the current United Charities. There are nine local almshouses which are available to local residents over the age of 55. They also offer Alpha Piperline emergency call services for the elderly, can refund up to £100 to school leavers under 25 who have spent money equipping themselves with tools, books, vocational training or further education and offer financial help needy individuals resident in the parish to help them purchase specific items.

== Media ==
Local TV coverage is provided by BBC South West and ITV West Country. Television signals are received Stockland Hill and local relay TV transmitters.

Local radio stations are BBC Radio Devon, Heart West, Greatest Hits Radio South West, Radio Exe Devon, and TCR Radio, a community-based station which broadcast from Tiverton.

The town is served by the local newspaper, Culm Valley Gazette.

== Landmarks ==
The street plan of the town still reflects the medieval layout of the town. Most shops lie along Fore Street with courts behind them linked by alleyways. The length of the high street reflects the prosperity of the town from the sixteenth to the eighteenth century when it was a centre of the cloth trade. The street plan is still fundamentally the same as shown on a map of 1663, with a wider area at the North end where markets were held, roads to Tiverton and Ponsford and a small lane leading down to a mill (now known as Lower Mill). This map has only two buildings with roofs coloured blue (conventionally meaning they were of slate) – St Andrew's church and the Walronds. There are two grade I listed buildings in Cullompton: the fifteenth century parish church (St Andrew's) and the Walronds at 6 Fore Street. There are also seven grade II* listed buildings and ninety grade II listed buildings. The centre of the town is a conservation area, first designated in 1977, with further planning protections implemented in 2009. Hillersdon House, a Victorian manor house is near to the town centre and within the parish.

=== The Walronds ===
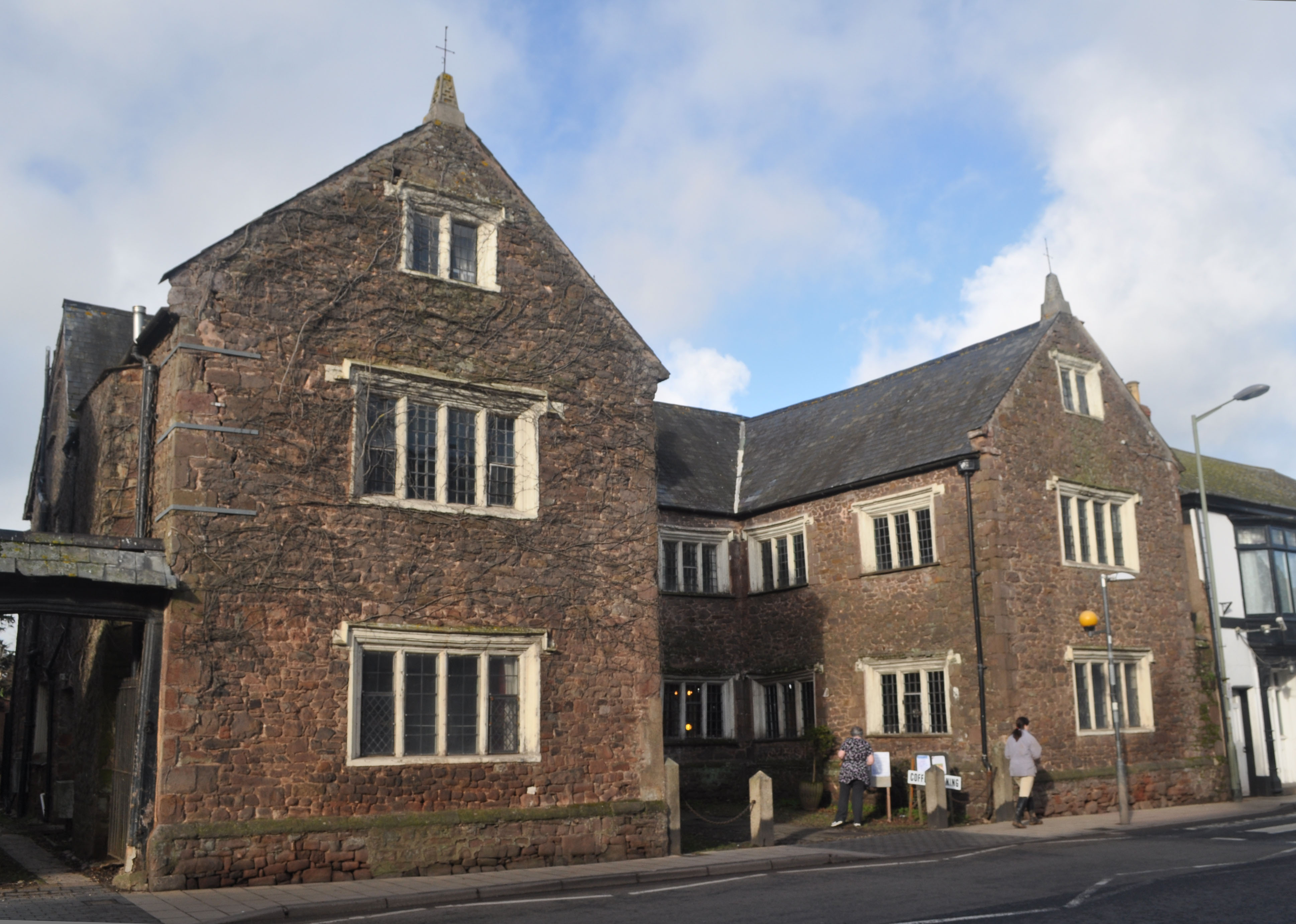
The Walronds before renovation

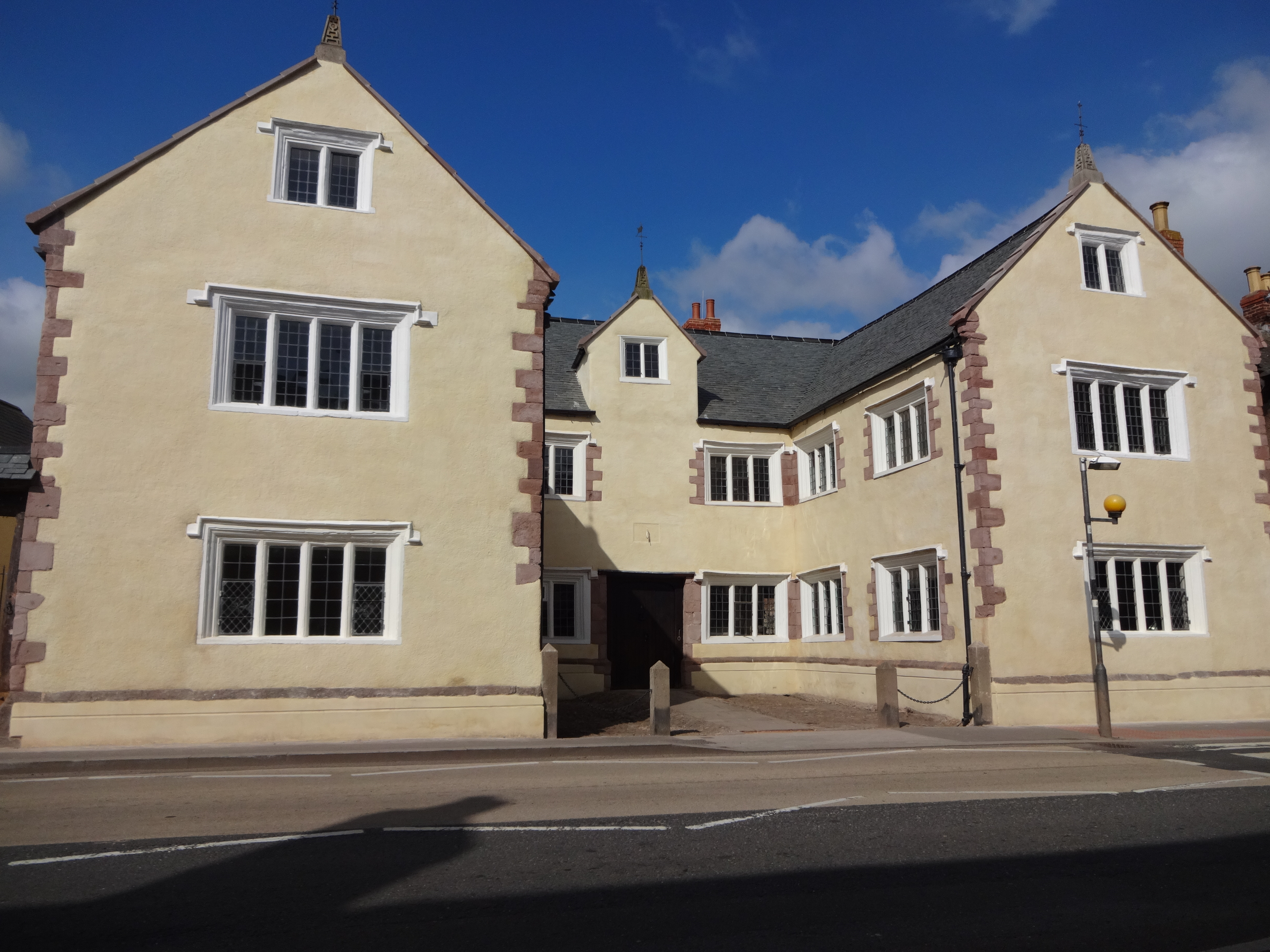
The Walronds after renovation

The Walronds was probably built in 1605 which is the date over the hall fireplace. John Peter, a lawyer, acquired the property by marriage into the Paris family and his initials are over the fireplace. The plan is a traditional one with the ground floor hall divided from the entrance passage by a screen. The main range has three storeys and there are two wings which are both two storeys high. In the upper south-east room is a barrel shaped ceiling and a second fireplace with the date 1605. The association with the prominent local gentry family of Walrond of Bradfield House only dates from the eighteenth century.

It is now owned by Cullompton Walronds Preservation Trust which was registered as a charity and as a private company limited by guarantee in the spring of 1997. It inherited half the building in 2005 from Miss June Severn and bought the other half. In 2008 the building became the only building in Mid Devon to be put on English Heritage's Buildings at Risk Register and received £250,000 from Devon County Council and £100,000 from Mid Devon District Council for restoration work. Emergency repairs costing £15,000 were carried out during 2008. In July 2010 the Heritage Lottery Fund announced that it would provide a grant of £1.75 million to help complete the restoration. Work began with the erection of scaffolding in August 2011. Restoration including restoring the rendering on the house. This had been removed in 1898 causing water to penetrate the fabric of the building. The house re-opened to the public following the restoration on 29 March 2014 with a display of kersey cloth and costumes made by the Walronds Costume making group.

The upper floors of the house, the inner garden and car park will be leased to the Vivat Trust for holiday lettings. The trust will retain the three rooms adjoining the path from Fore Street for public use. These comprise a meeting room, a kitchen and a lavatory. Additionally, the Trust plans to convert the garden which stretches back to Shortlands Lane into a park for the people of the town.

=== St Andrew's Church ===
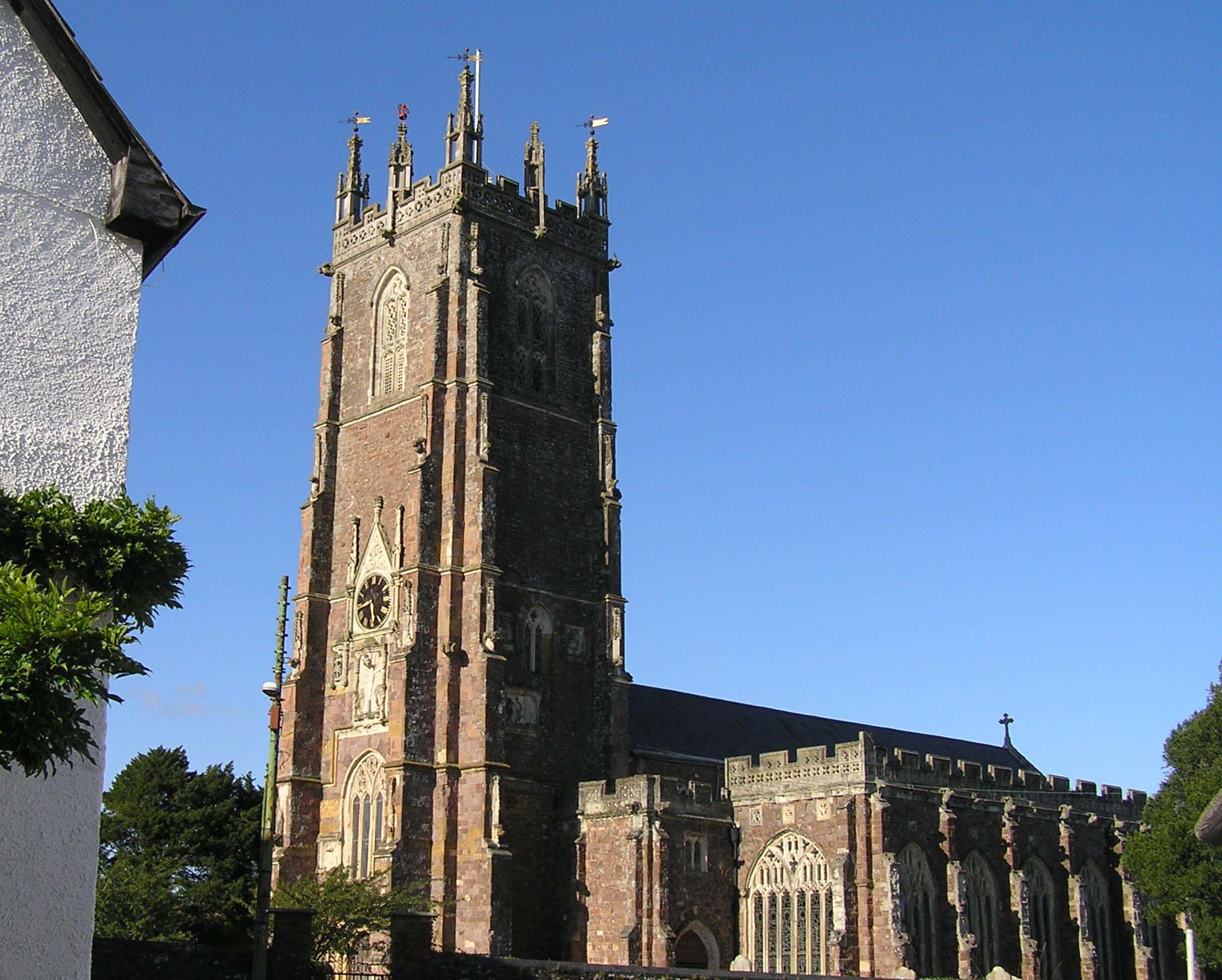
St Andrew's Church from the South West. Lane's Aisle can be seen at the side of the church

St Andrew's church dates from the fifteenth century and is set back from the main street but despite this its tower is a landmark which is highly visible from the surrounding area. The tower is 100 feet (30 m) tall with pinnacles on top which add a further 20 feet (6 m) to its height. On the west face are the badly damaged remains of a Crucifixion scene with figures of Edward VI and St George to either side. The tower also has a large clock face by Norman of Ilfracombe dating from about 1874. Despite being the first part of the church to be seen when approaching from the main street, it is however the most recent part of the church, being built 1545–1549. The tower is built in the local red sandstone with carved parts in Beer and Ham Hill stone.

The nave and chancel are carried on five pairs of piers and the interior has a boarded wagon roof coloured in blue, crimson and gold which stretches the whole length of the church. At the time of the construction of the Bristol and Exeter Railway, William Froude – the engineer given responsibility for this section of the line by Isambard Kingdom Brunel – inserted iron stringers to prevent the walls from spreading as a result of vibrations from the trains. A screen runs across the whole width of the church.

At the end of the nave is a Jacobean gallery with four oak pillars about 9 feet (3 m) tall. It dates from 1637 and there are sixteen figures carved on it. These figures are typical of the Stuart period and represent the twelve apostles and the Four Evangelists (meaning that Matthew and Mark appear twice). At the centre are Saint Andrew (with an X cross), Saint Peter (with a key) and Saint John (with the chalice).

The central window of the North Aisle is a World War II memorial and a World War I memorial is on the other side. The Moores Chantry Chapel (or Moor Hayes Chapel) occupying the easternmost bay of the North Aisle, was built by the Moor (alias Moore) family, long resident at Moor Hayes within the parish, and contains some original box pews. At the rear (western end) of the church are two large pieces of oak which make up a Golgotha which once rested on top of the Rood Screen. They are carved with rocks, skulls and bones. They were probably removed from the church in 1549 and cut into 2 pieces. For many years they remained in the graveyard.

On the south side of the church is the first major addition to the church: Lane's Aisle. This was built 1526–1529 by a local cloth merchant, John Lane (d.1529). It is fan vaulted in a style inspired by the Dorset aisle at Ottery St Mary and some of the carvings are similar to John Greenway's Chapel at Tiverton. John Lane and wife are buried at the east end of the aisle.

=== Cullompton Manor House ===
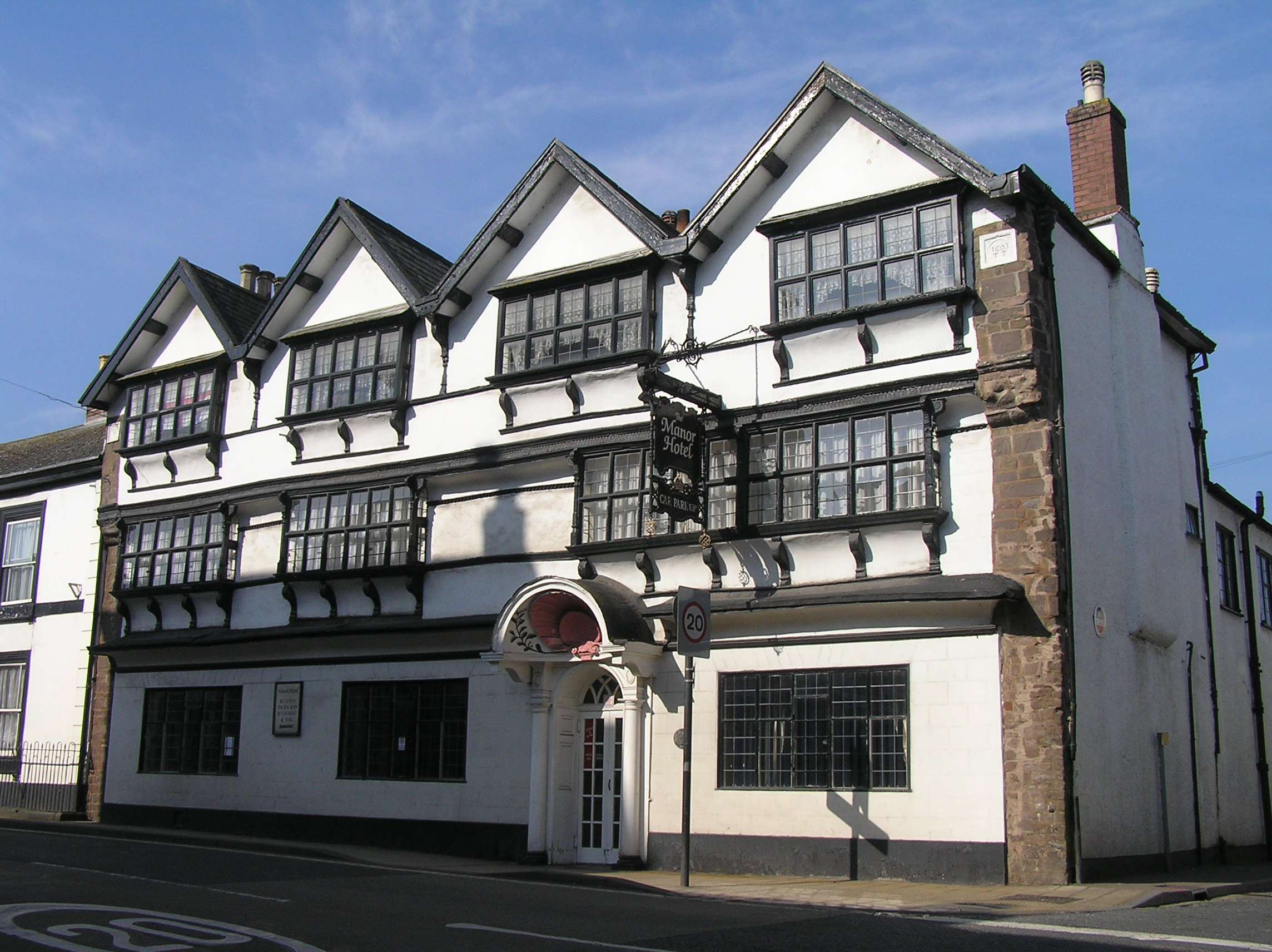
Cullompton Manor House. The building just in the left of the shot is the adjacent house, Veryards

Cullompton Manor House is a grade II* listed building with sections built in 1603 (dated panel and initials TT for Thomas Trock on the top corner of the front of the house) and 1718 (on a lead cistern head of a drainpipe, are the letters (L) S/WT (R) and the date 1718). It was originally a private residence and now forms part of the Manor House Hotel. It has a jettied half timbered front with four gables and stone end walls with upper windows on carved brackets. It was probably built in the sixteenth century but was refurbished in 1603 for Thomas Trock, a clothier. The original structure consisted only of the front part, in which there were three rooms and a passage on the ground floor, three rooms opening into each other on the floor above, and above again. The front room on the left was the former hall with large oak panels of the Queen Anne period, and a moulded and beamed ceiling. Part of an earlier newel stair which descended to the hall or kitchen survives above a back staircase. The house was remodelled in 1718 for William Sellock. At the front of the building is a hooded shell porch of the early 18th century supported on pilasters and the back of house is also early 18th century of red and blue brick, with windows with thick glazing bars beneath a hipped slate roof with coved eaves. It was given the name of The Manor House in 1850 by J. S. Upcott who owned the property at that time. During World War II it was requisitioned by the army and used to billet officers. The adjacent house, Veryards, was originally a separate residence but was bought by the owners of the Manor House Hotel and incorporated into the hotel in the 1980s.

The building is currently on the Heritage at Risk Register following a serious deterioration in its condition which led to concerns for public safety, and the issuing of a repairs notice under section 48 of Planning (Listed Buildings and Conservation Areas) Act 1990 by Mid Devon District Council.

=== Cullompton Leat ===
Running parallel to the main high street is a leat with a public footpath running along it. The leat runs from Head Weir, north of Cullompton, and takes its water from the Spratford Stream. It flows past three former watermills (Upper, Middle and Lower Mill) and then empties into the Culm near First Bridge. It is uncertain when the leat was first made but the south end of the leat and Lower Mill are shown on an early seventeenth-century map. The leat is no longer in use for powering mills and the Environment Agency is not interested in managing the leat nor keeping it flowing so the Cullompton Leat Conservancy Board was formed to restore and maintain the Leat in 2005.

== Transport ==
=== Roads ===
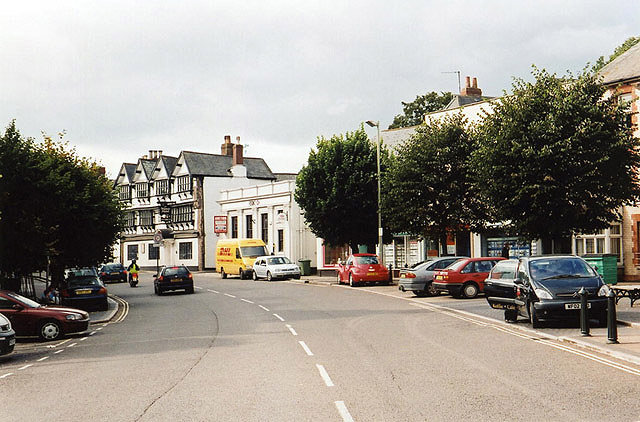
Cullompton High Street – this is the former route of the A38 and is now one of the areas with air quality problems

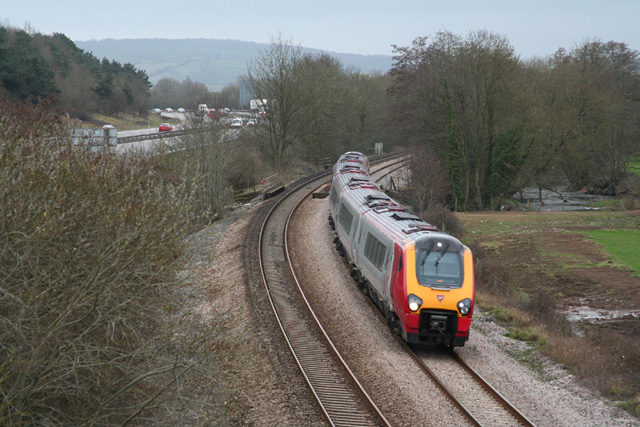
A Virgin CrossCountry train crosses a bridge over the river Culm near Cullompton and heads north for Taunton. To the left is the M5 motorway

Junction 28 of the M5 lies within the parish of Cullompton and a short distance from the town centre. Other major road links are the A373 to Honiton and the former A38 to Exeter which runs through the town, and is now the B3181. In 2001 61.6% of people living in Cullompton travelled to work by car or van and 83% of households had at least one car. In October 1969 a bypass was completed but after only five years this was upgraded to form part of the M5. Since this time traffic coming from the south of Cullompton to the M5 junction has had to pass through the centre of the town. There are now problems with air quality in the town and Mid Devon District Council have made the whole of the built up area in Cullompton an Air quality management area. Traffic on the exit slip road leaving the M5 northbound often backed up onto the motorway, so the Highways Agency and Devon County Council made junction improvements by widening roads, introducing traffic lights and reopening the left hand lane of the northbound slip road, at a cost of £1.3m. This cost was covered by businesses moving to Cullompton.

In January 2021 planning permission was agreed for a relief road from Station Road in the north to Duke Street in the south avoiding the town centre. However the full funding for the project was not found until a funding agreement between Mid Devon District Council and Homes England was signed in March 2025. As of 2025 work is expected to start in 2026 and complete in 2028. Early enabling works began in 2024 with the seeding of a replacement cricket pitch to be part of new sports facilities at Culm Garden Village. Land acquisition also starting in 2024. This road will enable the delivery of 5,000 new homes at Culm Garden Village to the east of the town.

=== Railways ===
The Bristol & Exeter Railway opened Cullompton railway station when the railway opened on 1 May 1844. Around 1931 the lines were widened to provide two passing loops and a new goods shed and waiting room were constructed. It closed to passengers on 5 October 1964, the site now being used for the M5 motorway Cullompton services. The nearest railway station is Tiverton Parkway, opened by British Rail in May 1986, about 5 miles (8 km) north along the M5.

==== Railway station reopening ====
Devon County Council's Travel Transport Plan includes the reopening of Cullompton railway station, and in July 2016 Mid Devon District Council announced that it would spend £40k on engineering design work to test the viability of their concept for a new station. This matched a previous commitment by Taunton Deane Borough Council of £40,000 and £10,000 contributions from the Town Councils of Cullompton and Wellington. The Cullompton Reopening Plan was a successful bidder in the May 2020 Round of the Department of Transport Ideas Fund. In June 2025 HM Treasury confirmed that funding for the reopening of the station had been approved.

=== Buses ===
The 1 and 373 buses run by Stagecoach South West provide regular bus services to Tiverton and Exeter. There is also a town circular bus run by Dartline. An express bus from Plymouth to Bristol, branded the SW Falcon and run by Stagecoach, stops at Cullompton.

== Education ==
Cullompton has two primary schools: St Andrews Primary School which is a medium-sized primary school with approximately 230 pupils in Key Stages 1 & 2, and nine classes and Willowbank Primary School. The secondary school is Cullompton Community College. It opened in 1964 on the present site and became fully comprehensive in 1979. It is now a co-educational comprehensive school for students aged between 11 and 16 with approximately 650 students on roll and in December 2003 it secured sponsorship of £50,000 from The Co-operative Group to enable it to become a Business and Enterprise college. It 2017 it was described as being in the top 10% of schools in the country by Offsted. There was also good support for pupils who have special educational needs and/ or disabilities and the most able pupils were reaching high standards.

== Religious sites ==
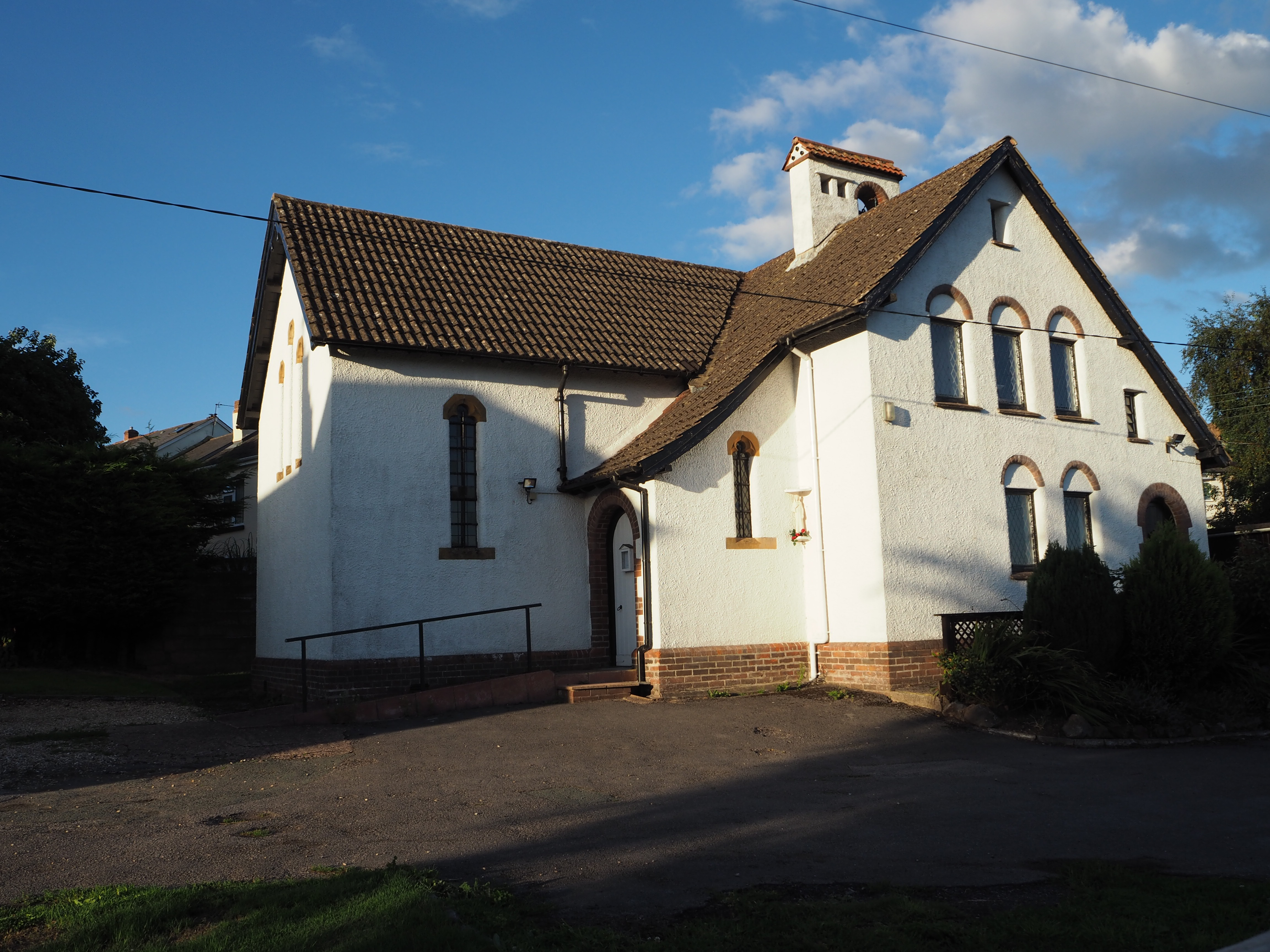
The Catholic Church of Saint Boniface

As well as the Parish church, St Andrew (see #Landmarks), there are several other religious sites. The Roman Catholic church, Saint Boniface, was built in 1929 by Manuel de las Casas who was descended from the uncle of Bartolomé de las Casas. The church served a separate parish until 2014 when the parish merged with that of Tiverton to become the Parish of St Boniface and St James Mid Devon. The Methodist church in New Cut is the third chapel on the site. The first was started in 1764 and the current building was built following a fire in 1872 which did serious damage to the chapel built in 1806. The Unitarian chapel on Pound Square dates from 1913 following the collapse of the previous building in 1911. It is the oldest nonconformist congregation in Cullompton. Hebron Evangelical Church was built in 1962. The Baptist Church is the site of a meeting house erected in 1743 on High Street.

== Sports and leisure ==
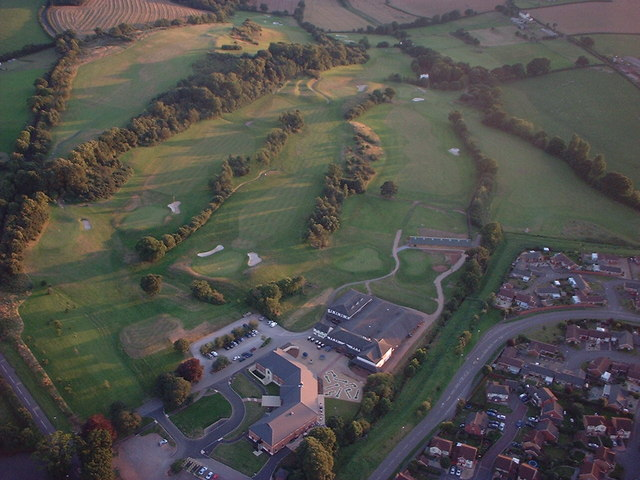
Padbrook Park golf course

=== Local teams and clubs ===
Cullompton Rugby Club was formed in 1892 and played on thirteen different grounds in and around the town before their current ground – Stafford Park – was purchased in 1980. In 2008-9 the senior 1st XV team won the Western Counties West League finishing the season unbeaten. On Saturday 9 May 2009 they won the EDF Energy Senior Vase by beating Tyldesley 8–7 at Twickenham. Exeter Chiefs prop Ben Moon formerly played for Cullompton and is now an England International. Ladies rugby started at Cullompton in 1997 and by 2009 the team had two qualified coaches. They currently play in the National Challenge South West South 2 league. Former Cullompton flanker Izzy Noel Smith, currently playing for Bristol has been capped for England. Abbie Brown is another former player who captained England at the 2018 Commonwealth Games where they won a bronze medal in the Rugby Sevens competition.

The local football team is Cullompton Rangers who were formed in 1945 and play in Premier Division of the South West Peninsula League. Their ground is called Speeds Meadow. There was also a women's football team – Cullompton Rangers L.F.C. who were formed when Exeter City L.F.C. amalgamated with Cullompton Rangers AFC but in 2011 the women's team folded when the manager was forced to leave and a replacement could not be found.

Cullompton cricket club was established in 1892 and they play at Landspeed Meadow, by the Cullompton Community Association Fields. There are also a variety of other clubs including several bowls clubs and badminton, running, squash, and Taekwondo martial arts clubs.

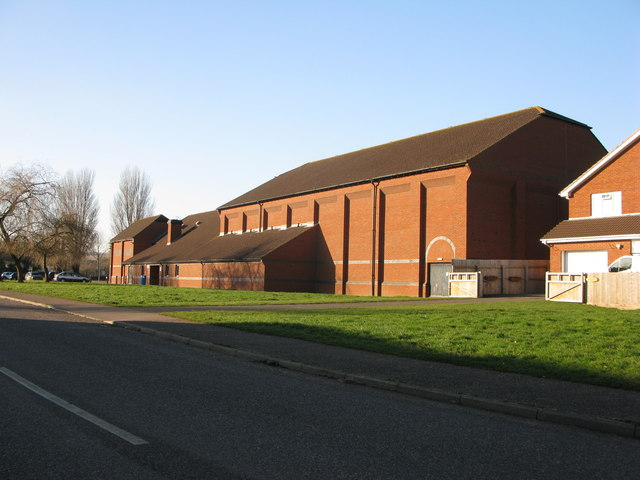
Culm Valley Sports Centre

=== Sports and leisure facilities ===
The town has a sports centre, Culm Valley Sports Centre, which is currently run by Mid Devon District Council. It was opened in 1985 and facilities include a fitness studio, an all-weather pitch, a sports hall, squash courts and a sauna. The town is also home to Padbrook Park – a golf course and sporting and recreational centre which first opened in March 1992. The facilities include a Parkland Golf Course, a Golf School, a 40-bedroom hotel, conference suites, health & fitness centre, indoor bowls, fishing lake, beauty salon, restaurants and a sports bar

== Notable people ==
- John Lane (died 1528), cloth merchant, builder of the Lane Chapel in St Andrew's Church, Cullompton.
- John Shute (died 1563), painter and architect, also painted miniatures.
- Thomas Manton (1620–1677), a puritan clergyman, town lecturer, 1640 to 1643 and clerk to the Westminster Assembly and chaplain to Oliver Cromwell.
- Robert Davy (died 1793), an English portrait painter.
- Richard Crosse (1742–1810), painter of portrait miniatures, was born in Knowle, a local hamlet.
- Edward Ellicott (1768–1847), naval officer during the French Revolutionary Wars and Napoleonic Wars, was baptised in Cullompton.
- Charles Fowler (1792–1867), architect, designed Covent Garden Market in London.
- William Froude (1810–1879), engineer, hydrodynamicist, naval architect and churchwarden in 1842–44.
- Clive Glynn (1893-1946), World War I flying ace, died in Cullompton and is buried in the Cullompton cemetery.
- W. G. Hoskins (1908–1992), historian, contributed to the study of landscape history.
- Mike Thresher (1931-1999), footballer who played 378 games for Bristol City
- Dr Michael Dixon (born 1952), a general practitioner and current Head of the Royal Medical Household.
- Joss Stone (born 1987), singer, songwriter and actress; lives near Cullompton.

== Sources ==
- The people of the parish (2001). The Book of Cullompton. Tiverton, Devon: Halsgrove. ISBN 1-84114-117-8.
- Morris, Judy (2007). The Second Book of Cullompton. Wellington, Somerset: Halsgrove. ISBN 978-1-84114-625-6.
