= Cullompton Community College =

Location
- Exeter Road; Cullompton, Devon, EX15 1DX; England
- Coordinates: 50.85172°N 3.39301°W

Information
- Type: Foundation school
- Established: 1872
- Local authority: Devon County Council
- Department for Education URN: 113502 Tables
- Ofsted: Reports
- Headteacher: James Loten
- Gender: Coeducational
- Age: 11 to 16
- Enrolment: 755 as of January 2023
- Website: http://www.cullompton.devon.sch.uk/

Cullompton Community College is a coeducational foundation secondary school located in Cullompton in the county of Devon.

First established in 1872, the school relocated to its current site in 1964, and became fully comprehensive in 1979. In December 2003 it secured sponsorship of £50,000 from The Co-operative Group to enable it to become a Business and Enterprise College. As a foundation school, Cullompton Community College is administered by Devon County Council, which coordinates the schools admissions.

Cullompton Community College offers GCSEs.
