= Cullompton Town Hall =

Municipal building in Cullompton, Devon, England

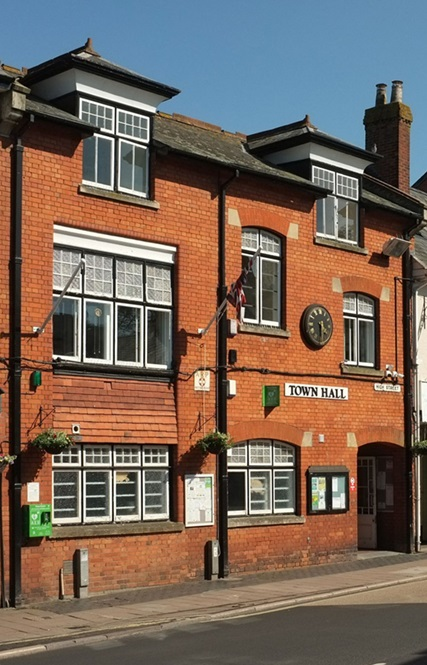
- The building in 2016

- Shown in Devon
- 50.8575°N 3.3926°W
- Location: High Street, Cullompton

History
- Built: 1903

Site notes
- Architectural style: Edwardian Free Style

Cullompton Town Hall is a municipal building in the High Street in Cullompton, a town in Devon, in England. The building is currently used as the offices and meeting place of Cullompton Town Council.

== History ==
Following the implementation of the Local Government Act 1894, which established parish councils in rural areas, the new parish council in Cullompton decided to commission offices for its meetings. The site they selected was occupied, in part, by the Half Moon Inn. The new building was designed in the Edwardian Free Style, built in red brick and was officially opened as the Parish Rooms in 1903. The design involved an asymmetrical main frontage of three bays facing onto the High Street. The left-hand bay was fenestrated by four-part casement windows on the ground floor and first floor with a bi-partite dormer window at attic level. The other two bays contained openings on the ground hall and segmental-headed casement window on the first floor, albeit at different heights. The right-hand bay also contained a bi-partite dormer window at attic level. Internally, the principal room was the committee room.

The building also served as a fire station until the Second World War, and during the war, it accommodated a first aid post. Following local government re-organisation in 1974, the parish council was succeeded by Cullompton Town Council, which continued to hold its meetings in the town hall. In 1995, to mark the one hundredth anniversary of the founding of the council, a clock was placed on the front of the building at first floor level. It also renamed the building as the town hall. After a gap of about 50 years, the tradition of holding an indoor market in the town hall every Wednesday was revived in 2008.

In March 2010, councillors suggested that the vacant site previously occupied by the magistrates court on Exeter Court might be developed as a town hall, but this plan was prevented when a group formed to oppose the proposal to purchase the site were elected to two thirds of the council seats in May 2011. In April 2020, in the context of very high cost estimates for upgrading the town hall, the concept of re-locating to alternative premises was again revived.
