= John Lane (clothier) =

Wealthy clothier from Cullompton in Devon

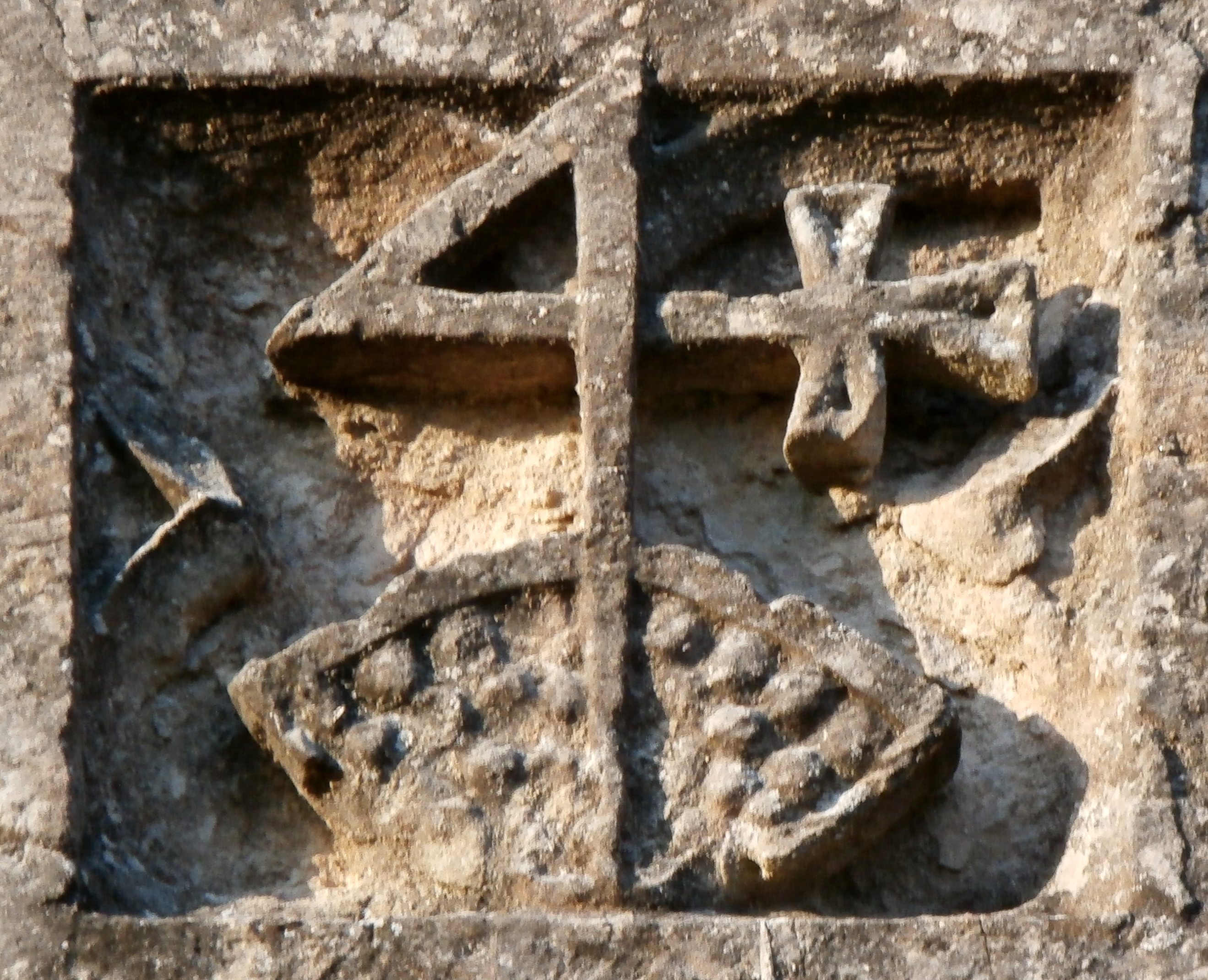
Merchant's mark of John Lane, sculpted on exterior of the Lane Aisle of Cullompton Church, showing the mystical "Sign of Four" the stem of which is formed of a teasel frame used for carding wool. The emblem is repeated profusely on corbels and ceiling bosses inside the chapel

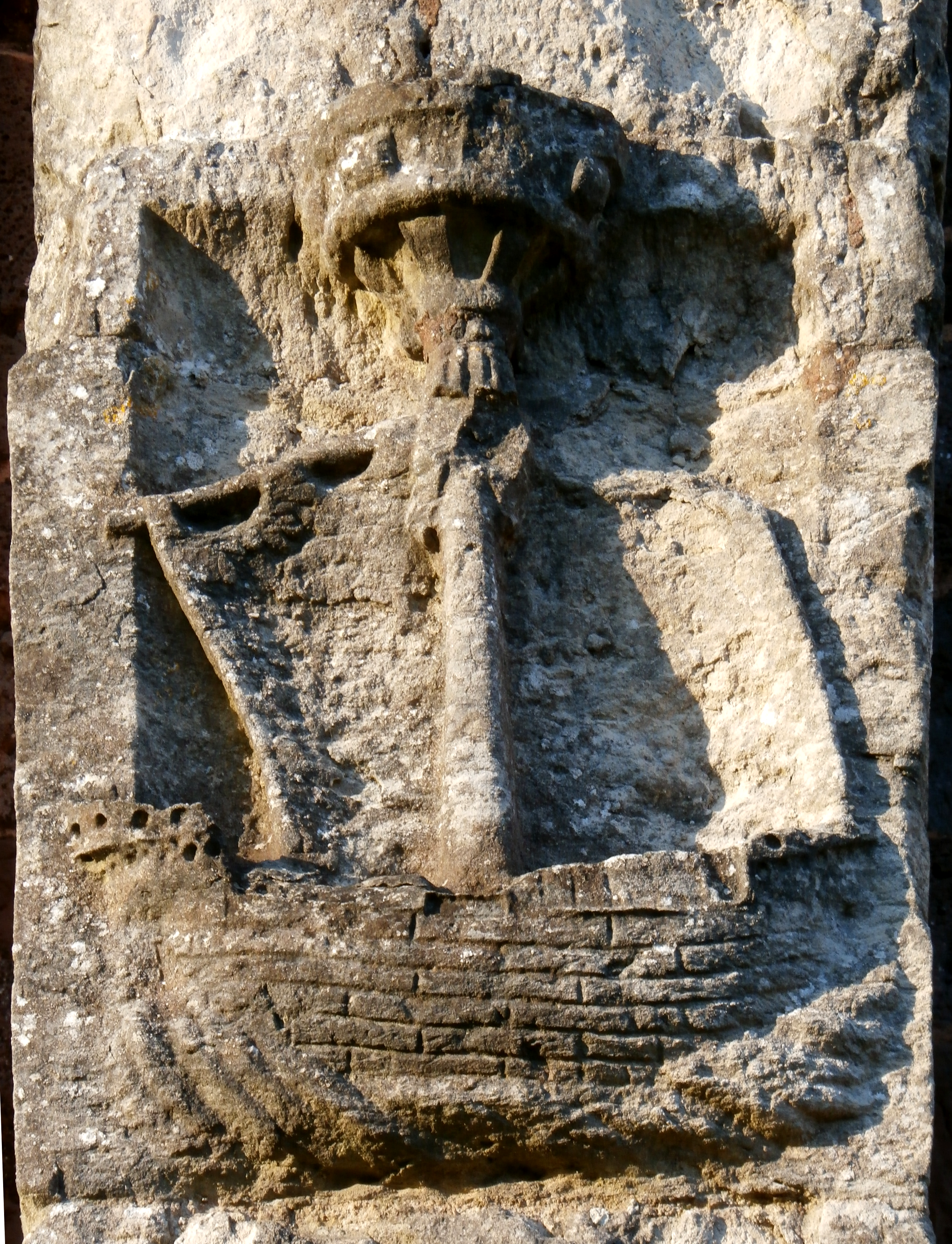
Ship from Lane's trading fleet, relief sculpture on exterior of Lane Chapel

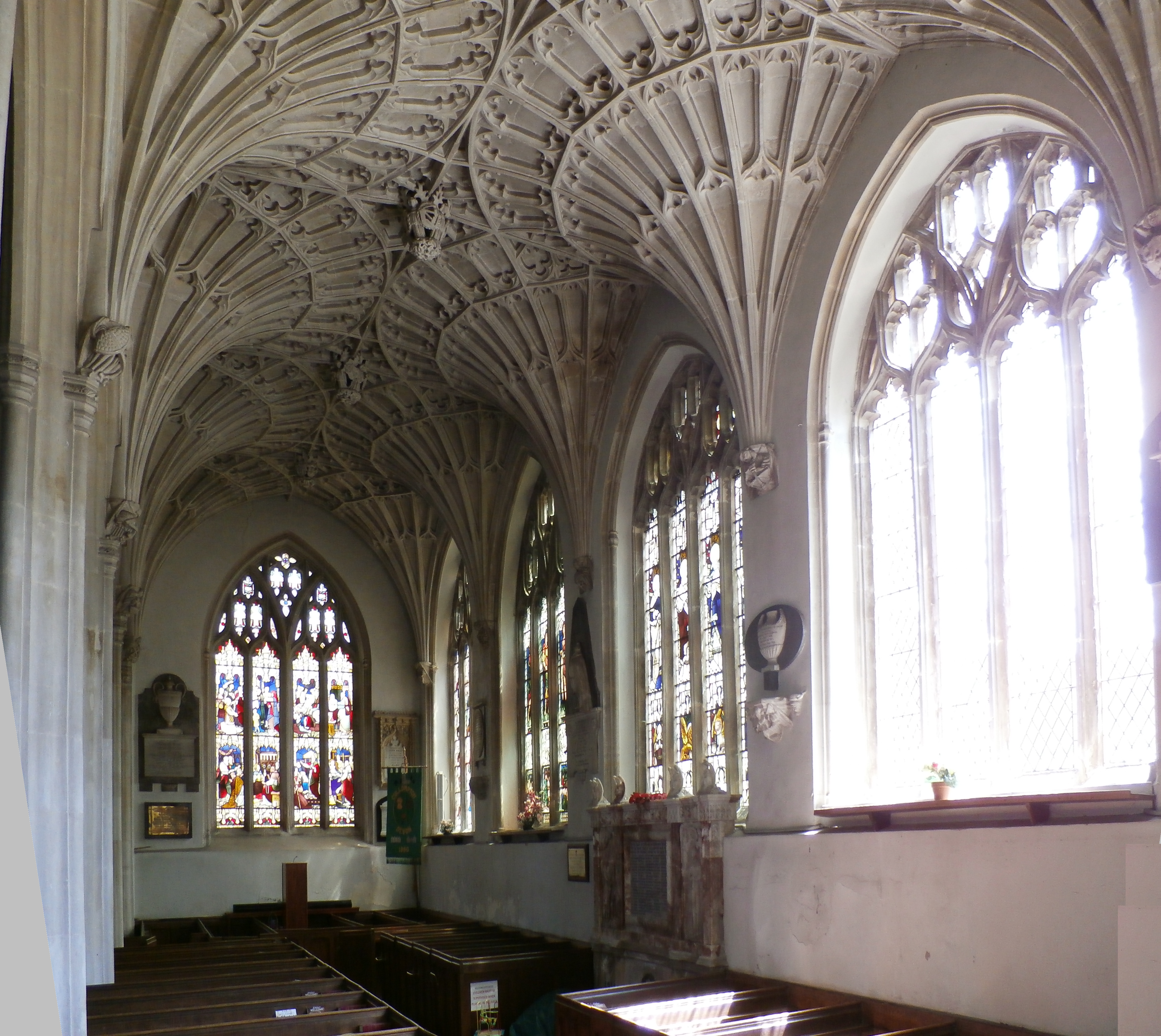
Interior of the Lane Chapel, looking eastwards; the stained glass is modern

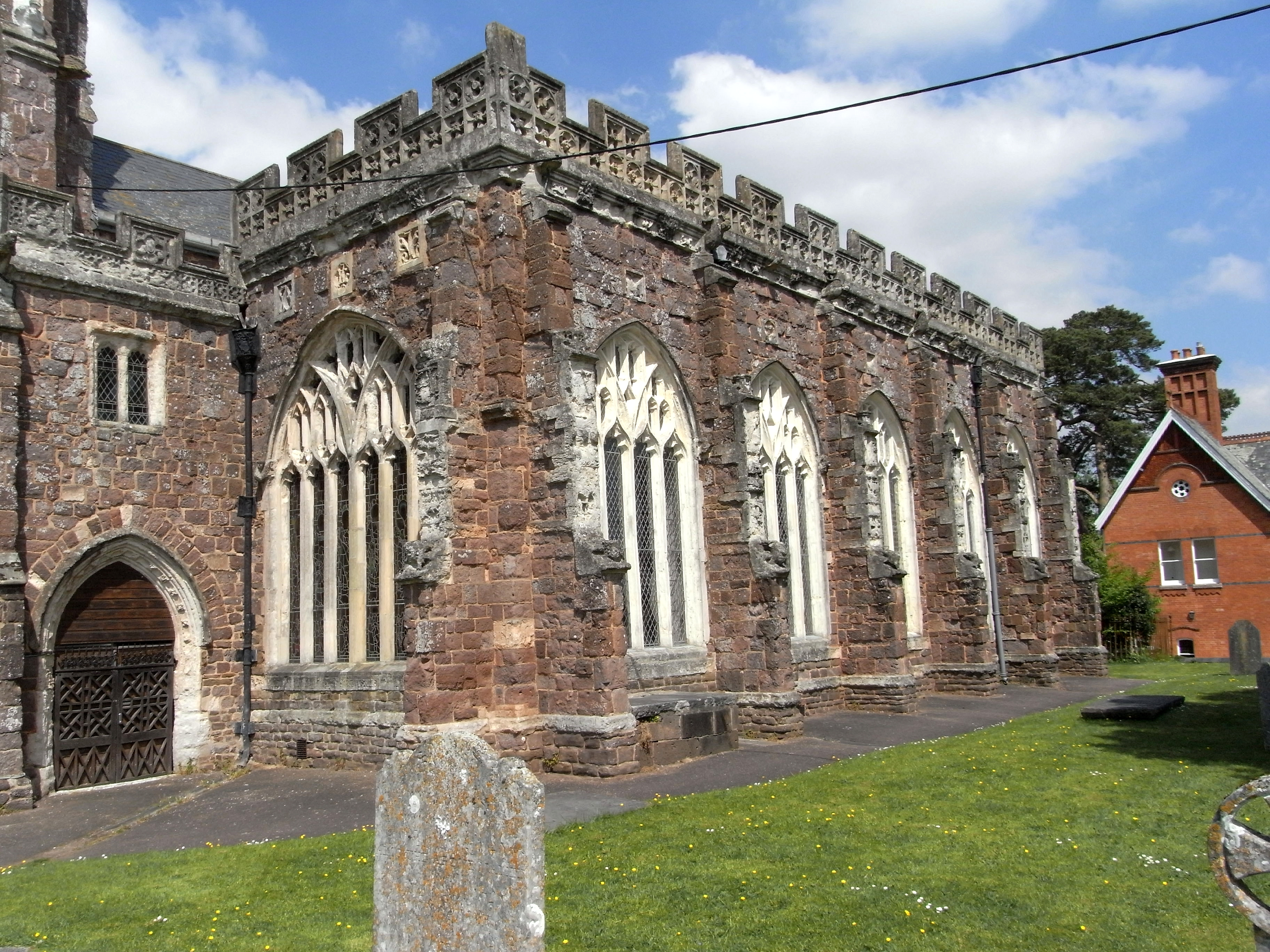
Exterior of the Lane Chapel, looking eastwards

John Lane (died 1528) was a wealthy clothier from Cullompton in Devon, remembered today for having built the magnificent Lane Chapel (or Lane Aisle) on the south side of St Andrew's Church, Cullompton. Due to a misreading of the inscription on the exterior of his Chapel he was said by Polwhele (1793) to have occupied the office of Wapentake Custos, Lanarius, (translated as "Constable of the Hundred, wool merchant"). However no historical evidence supports the existence of such an office and the inscription was later correctly re-interpreted by Smirke (1847).

== Lane Chapel ==
The Lane Chapel is a grand structure of five bays with large windows and a magnificent fan-vaulted ceiling. Building work commenced in 1526 (as is stated on the lengthy inscription on the external walls), two years before Lane's death, was continued by his widow Thomasine and finished in 1552, according to an inscription on the exterior of the east wall. It is profusely embellished in the interior on the ceiling corbels and bosses with relief sculptures of angels holding Lane's merchant's mark. The exterior walls are embellished with relief sculptures (now severely worn away by the elements) of biblical scenes and of items related to Lane and his trade, such as ships, cloth shears, teasel frames, merchant's marks, monograms, etc. A lengthy relief-sculpted inscription in English in black-letter Gothic script runs around the three exterior walls of the building, low-down beneath the windows (see below).

The Lane Chapel is comparable in many respects to the nearby Greenway Chapel and Greenway Porch in St Peter's Church, Tiverton, built in 1517 by his contemporary fellow merchant John Greenway (died 1529).

=== Dispute with Moore family ===
At the east end of the opposite (north) aisle of Cullompton Church is situated the Moor Hayes Chapel, anciently the property of the Moore family of Moor Hayes, within the parish, lords of the manor of Cullompton. Lane's widow had a dispute with this family concerning their trespassing into the Lane Chapel, which resulted in a law suit heard by the Star Chamber, the record of which is held at the National Archives at Kew, summarised as follows:

"Plaintiff: Thomasyne late wife of John Lane, of Cullompton; Defendant: Humphrey More, John More, Christopher More, and John Smyth. Place or subject: Forcible entry into a chapel built by plaintiff's late husband adjoining to the parish church".

== Ledger stone ==
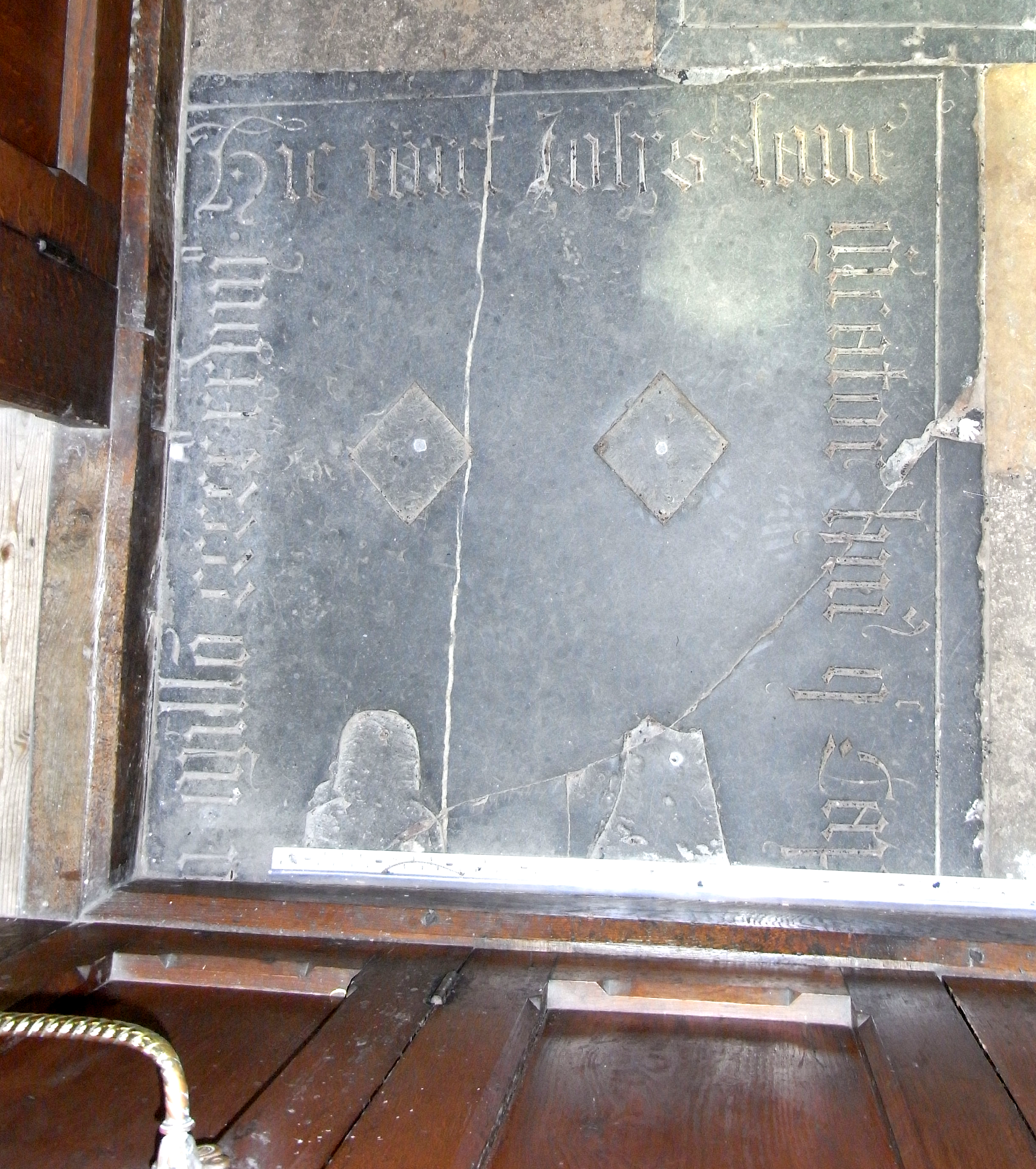
Ledger stone of John Lane in the Lane Chapel; now mostly covered by box pews and missing its monumental brasses, of which the matrices in the shapes of the head and shoulders of a man and a woman (wearing a headdress) with two lozenge-shaped heraldic shields above are visible

He was buried at the east end of his Chapel, where survives his ledgerstone, in the middle of the aisle and now mostly covered by box-pews and missing the monumental brasses of which only the matrices remain, in the shapes of a man and a woman, wearing a headdress, facing each other, the man on the left and his wife on the right, with two lozenge-shaped heraldic shields above, also missing their brasses. The heads of the figures face the west-end of the Chapel. The ledger line is inscribed in Latin as follows:

Hic jacet Joh(anne)s Lane, M(er)cator, huiusq(ue) capellae fundator cum Thomasi(n)a uxore sua, qui dict(us) Johan(nes) obi(i)t XV. Feb(ruarii) annoque Dom(ini) mill(ensim)o CCCCCXXVIII. ("Here lies John Lane, merchant, founder of this chapel, with Thomasine his wife, which said John died on the 15th (day) of February in the year of our Lord the one thousandth five hundredth and twenty eighth").

== External inscription ==
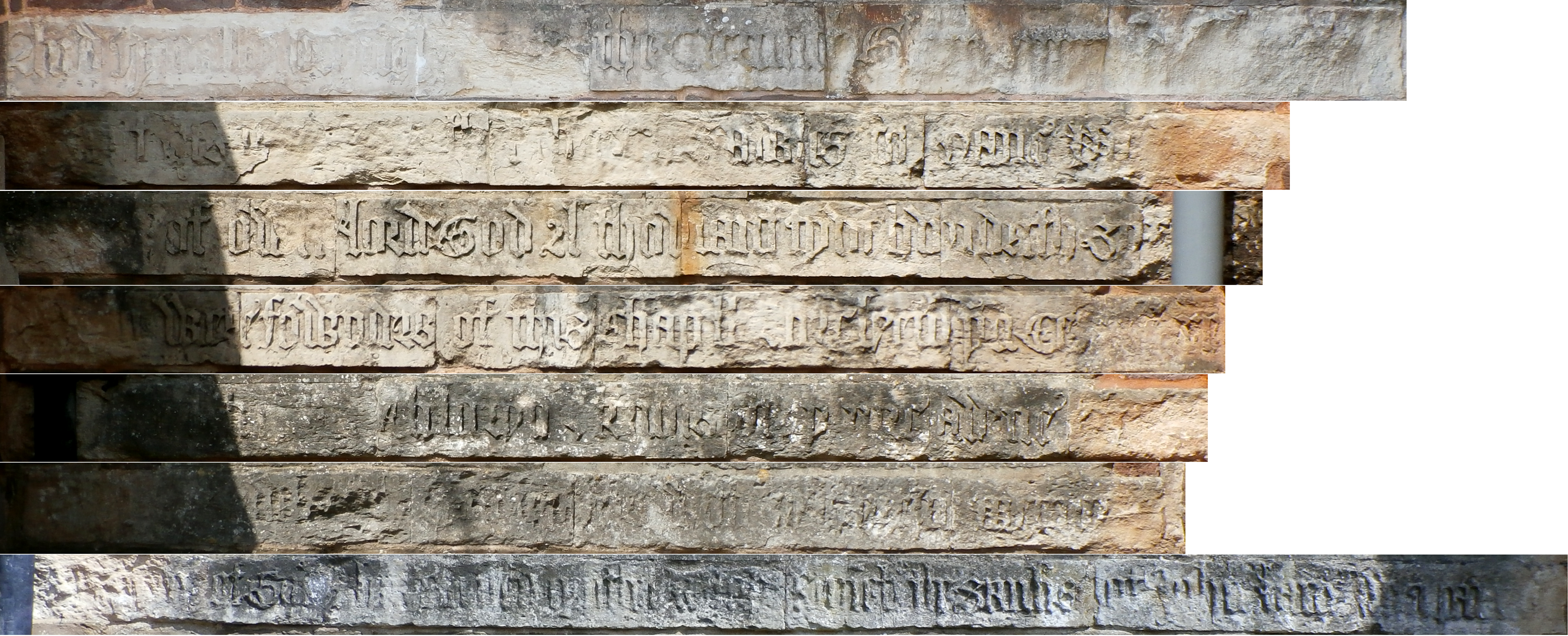
Inscription, in 7 sections, exterior of the Lane Chapel

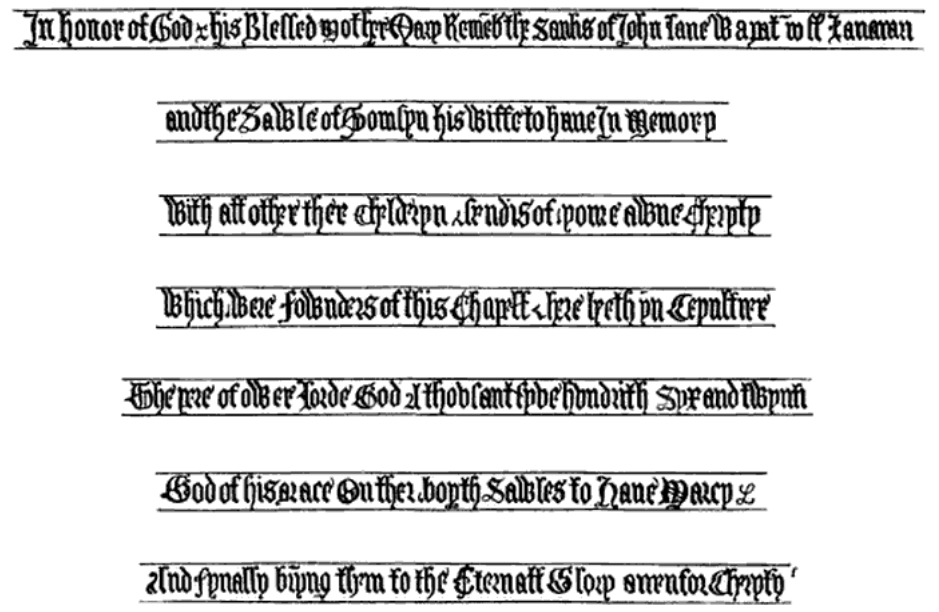
1847 facsimile of inscription

The following inscription, in parts much worn-away by the elements, is sculpted low-down on the outside wall of the aisle, running round all three sides of the building, with each word cut on detached stones:

"In honor of God and his blessed Mother Mary, remember the soule of John Lane (with a Pater Noster and Ave Mary)(Wapentake Custos, Lanarius,) and the soule of Thomasine his wife, to have in memory all other their children and friends of your own charity which were founders of this chapple, and here lie in sepulture, the year of our Lord one thousand five hundred and six and twenty. God of his grace on both their soules to have mercy, and finally bring them to eternal glory. Amen for charity."
