= Bæddel and bædling =

Old English terms

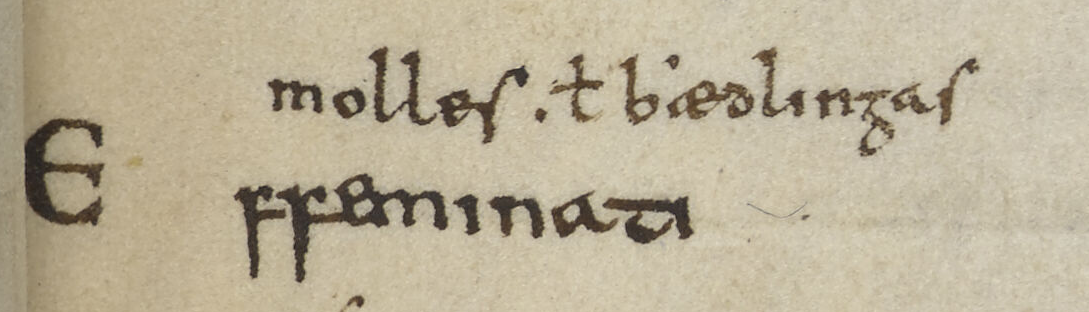
The word bædlingas appears alongside molles in the Cleopatra Glossaries as a translation of the Latin word effeminati ('effeminate ones').

Bæddel (Note: Old English pronunciation: [ˈbæd.del]) and bædling (Note: Old English pronunciation: [ˈbædliŋɡ]) are Old English (Note: Old English developed after the Anglo-Saxon settlement of Britain in the 5th and 6th centuries. The language evolved into Middle English by c. 1100.) (Anglo-Saxon) terms theorised to refer to non-normative sexual or gender categories. They occur in only five medieval glossaries and penitentials (guides for religious penance). Scholars debate their exact meanings (and their distinction, if any), but both are linked to effeminacy and adultery. Bæddel appears in one glossary, where it glosses "hermaphrodite" and a "man of both sexes", while bædling glosses an "effeminate" or "soft" person. The Oxford English Dictionary states that bæddel may be related to the Modern English adjective bad; scholars have proposed that bad shares a common ancestor with both bæddel and bædling.

The Old English translation of the medieval penitential Paenitentiale Theodori (Note: While the Paenitentiale Theodori itself was compiled around the early 8th century, it is unknown when the Old English translations, known as the Canons of Theodore, were made. Surviving manuscripts of these translations date to the 11th century, but they may have been copied from much older texts. Two of the Old English translations mention bædlings. The version discussed above is MS. 190 held by Corpus Christi College, Cambridge. The other is MS. 8558–63 in the Bibliothèque Royale, Brussels.) distinguishes men from bædlings; it describes men having sex with other men or with bædlings as separate offences, and states that bædlings must atone for having sex with other bædlings. The term has been variously conjectured to refer to people assigned male at birth who exhibited gender-nonconforming behaviour or took on a feminine social role, or to intersex people, (Note: In medieval sources, the term hermaphrodite, now offensive, generally aligns with modern conceptions of intersex people.) and it is also suggested that it may have included people assigned female at birth who took on a masculine social role. Some scholars have associated the term with gender non-normative burials from the period, and have suggested that bædlings could represent a third gender outside the gender binary, or a form of gender nonconformity in Anglo-Saxon society. The 11th-century English Antwerp Glossary associates bæddel with the uniquely attested wæpenwifestre, (Note: Old English pronunciation: [ˈwæːpenˌwiːvestre]; WAP-pen-wee-ves-tre.) seemingly denoting a woman with a phallus or one displaying masculine characteristics.

== Definition ==
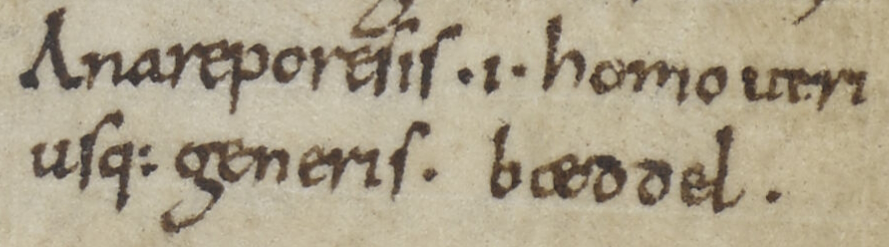
Bæddel translating the Latin anareporesis, i. homo utriusque generis in the Antwerp-London Glossaries

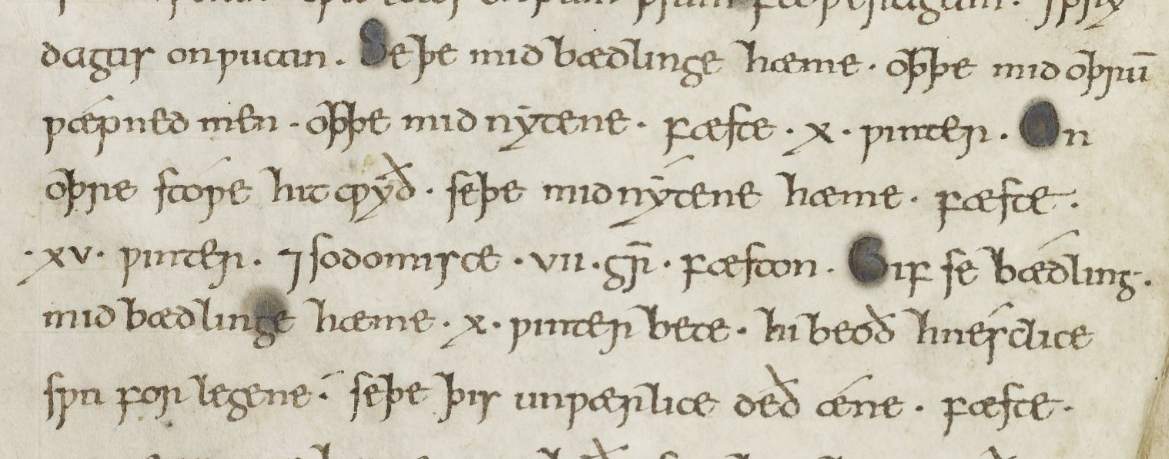
The canons about bædlings in the Old English Canons of Theodore

Bæddel and bædling are Old English terms referring to some category of gender, sex, or sexuality outside the norm of Anglo-Saxon England, although their precise meaning and scope are debated by scholars. The terms are quite obscure; bædling is attested in a small number of sources, including two glossaries and two penitentials (guides for religious penance)—while bæddel is only attested from two entries in the 11th-century Antwerp Glossary. The linguist and etymologist Anatoly Liberman describes the terms as synonyms.

In the Antwerp Glossary bæddel is used to gloss two Latin phrases: anareporesis, i. homo utriusque generis ('andreporesis, i.e. man of both sexes') and hermafroditus ('hermaphrodite'). These are the two extant glosses which use the word. The Antwerp Glossary associates bæddel with scritta (scrætte, "adulteress") and the hapax legomenon wæpenwífestre, which all gloss the word "hermaphrodite". Wæpenwifestre literally means a wif (woman) with a wæpen (weapon); it seems, metaphorically, to mean a 'woman with a phallus' or displaying manly characteristics, along the lines of the common term wæpnedman (a male, lit. 'weapon-person').

Bædling is probably derived from bæddel, either with the patronymic suffix -ing or the diminutive patronymic suffix -ling. It is used to gloss three different Latin words in the four extant sources, including mollis 'soft person' and effeminati 'effeminate ones'. Bædling glosses a third word from the Harley Glossary, cariar, which is difficult to interpret and possibly a reference to the Anatolian region of Caria. Caria is the location of the legendary spring Salmacis, with the supposed power of feminising and softening men. The putative reference to Anatolia in the glossary may also indicate a connection with eunuchs, who were commonly associated with the Byzantine Empire and the Orient more broadly. Like other glosses, the Cleopatra Glossaries (dating to the reign of Æthelstan, between 924 and 939) associate bædling with effeminacy and softness.

An Old English translation of the penitential handbook Paenitentiale Theodori makes a distinction between men and bædlings, describing "sex with other men" and "sex with bædlings" as separate (although equal) offences for men. It states that bædlings who have sex with other bædlings must atone for ten winters, describing them as "soft like an adulteress"; the Antwerp Glossary also associates bæddels with adultery, as noted above. The penitential also specifies that both adults and children can be bædlings, setting aside different lengths of atonement for bædlings of different ages. The historian Jacob Bell theorises that the reference to a sexual relationship between two bædlings may refer to pederasty.

=== Analysis ===
Bæddel seems to connote effeminacy. Bædling is thought by scholars to denote some sort of gender nonconformity, sexual passivity, or possibly a third gender. (Note: Clark 2009, p. 69: "If we assume that the Anglo‐Saxons recognized a continuum of gender, of which ‘manly man’ is the positive pole, the bædling falls neatly into place as one of a variety of examples of 'not‐men', including ('normal') women, children, and unmanly men.")

Although philologist Robert D. Fulk and historian David Clark note that bædling may refer to a passive partner in gay sexual intercourse, the reference to bædlings having sex with each other complicates this as a strict definition. This association with softness may denote people assigned male at birth who took feminine social roles or feminine gender presentation. It is debated by scholars how bæddels and bædlings fitted into the Anglo-Saxon gender system. Bædlings may be regarded as a third gender category outside of the usual bounds of manhood and womanhood, or as emasculated people who share a position of "non-manhood" with women and children when compared with "manly men". The term may have also referred to people assigned female at birth who took on masculine social roles. Fulk has associated the terms with gender non-normative burials from the Anglo-Saxon period, including male skeletons buried alongside female grave goods.

== Etymology ==
During the late 19th and early 20th centuries, scholars such as J. R. C. Hall and Ferdinand Holthausen argued for an additional meaning of 'to defile' or 'to stain' for the Old English term bædan 'to compel', from which bæddel was possibly derived. They cite a Latin gloss in the 12th-century Eadwine Psalter. However, the psalter gives unusual and erroneous glosses for some Latin terms, causing philologists such as Herbert Dean Meritt (writing in 1954) to dismiss the alternate definition. Fulk, concurring with Meritt in 2004, derived bæddel from a hypothetical early Old English term *bai-daili-, 'both parts', mirroring the derivation of words for hermaphrodite in other Germanic languages, such as Danish tvetulle 'two tools'. There are no known references to bæddel or bædling from the Late Medieval period, but a 17th-century Arthurian ballad in Scots mentions a Badlyng, a word which the scholar William Sayers identifies as "sodomite" in a 2019 paper. A dialectal word badling attested in Northern England for variously 'rascal', 'worthless person', or 'naughty child', may descend from bædling, but could also be a later, independent derivation from bad and the suffix -ling. The in-progress Dictionary of Old English gives no etymology for bædling, tentatively defining it as an "effeminate man" or "homosexual".

=== Connection to bad ===
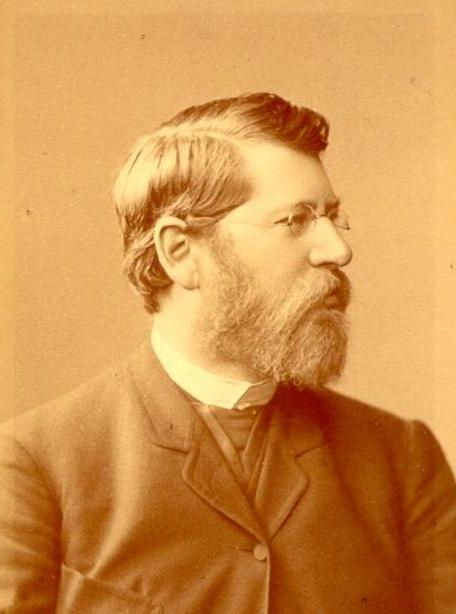
Julius Zupitza theorised that the English word bad derived from bæddel.

The philologist Julius Zupitza theorised that the English word bad is derived from bæddel. James Murray, the first chief editor of the Oxford English Dictionary (OED), supported Zupitza's theory and included it in the dictionary's first edition in 1884. This etymology's inclusion in the OED led to widespread scholarly acceptance, although some philologists continued to contest it. The Oxford Dictionary of English Etymology more tentatively makes the connection, denoting it as only a possible etymology. The current, online edition of the OED (as of 2025) and the 1989 second edition of the Oxford English Dictionary continue to state that bæddel is "perhaps related to" bad, with the latter dismissing alternative etymologies from Celtic words as "out of the question", while also suggesting a possible origin from bædan.

Sayers proposes a shared etymology of Modern English bad, bæddel, and bædling from linguist Xavier Delamarre's reconstructed Gaulish word *baitos 'foolish, mad, immoral'; this adjective could have been carried into Old English by the hypothetical form *baed, which would connote physical and moral deficiency (characteristics perhaps associated by Old English speakers with the native British populations of the rest of the British Isles). Writing in 1988, the linguist Richard Coates also derived bæddel and bædling from a common ancestor with bad, in the form of a hypothetical Old English *badde possibly meaning 'worthless' or 'of ill omen'. Liberman concurs with Coates on the etymological link to *badde, and suggests that a potential precursor to a theorized Old English *bæd and thus to Modern English bad was a West Germanic baby word meaning 'bad'; this would have replaced the standard word for 'bad' in Old English, yfel (precursor of Modern English evil) during the Middle English period. Bad is attested in nicknames from 1297.

== See also ==
- Homosexuality in medieval Europe
- Intersex people in history
- Kinsey scale
- Transgender history
