= Orc =

Humanoid monster in Tolkien's fiction

Creature information
- Other name: Ork
- Grouping: Humanoid
- Sub grouping: Monster
- Similar entities: Goblin, Uruk-hai, Troll
- Folklore: Middle-earth

Origin
- First attested: The Hobbit (1937)
- Region: Middle-earth
- Habitat: Mountains, caves, dark forests
- Details: Multiple alternative origins proposed by Tolkien, e.g. corrupted elves, or bred by Morgoth

An orc (sometimes spelt ork; /ɔːrk/) is a fictional race of humanoid monsters often found in works of modern fantasy. Originally called "Goblins," the concept of modern orcs can be found in George MacDonald's The Princess and the Goblin, and later adapted into J. R. R. Tolkien's Middle-earth fantasy fiction, where the first uses of the word can be found.

In Tolkien's The Lord of the Rings, orcs appear as a brutish, aggressive, ugly, and malevolent race of monsters, contrasting with the benevolent Elves. He described their origins inconsistently, including as a corrupted race of elves, or bred by the Dark Lord Morgoth, or turned to evil in the wild. Tolkien's orcs serve as a conveniently wholly evil enemy that could be slaughtered without mercy.

The orc was a sort of "hell-devil" in Old English literature, and the orc-né (pl. orc-néas, "demon-corpses") was a race of corrupted beings and descendants of Cain, alongside the elf, according to the poem Beowulf. Tolkien adopted the term orc from these old attestations, which he professed was a choice made purely for "phonetic suitability" reasons. (Note: Carpenter 2023, #144 to Naomi Mitchison 25 April 1954)

Tolkien's concept of orcs has been adapted into the fantasy fiction of other authors, and into games of many different genres such as Dungeons & Dragons, Magic: The Gathering, and Warcraft.

== Etymology ==
Latin orcus is glossed as Old English "orc, þyrs ꝉ hel-deofol" ("Goblin, spectre or hell-devil") in the 10th century Cleopatra Glossaries.

The Anglo-Saxon word orc, which Tolkien used, is generally thought to be derived from the Latin word/name Orcus, though Tolkien expressed doubt about this. The term orcus is glossed as "orc, þyrs, oððe hel-deofol" (Note: Here: "orcus [orc].. þrys ꝉ heldeofol" is the redaction given by Pheifer 1974, p. 37n but þrys appears to be a mistranscription for þyrs. The original text uses "ꝉ", the scribal abbreviation for Latin vel meaning "or", which Wright has silently expanded as Anglo-Saxon oððe.) ("Goblin, spectre, or hell-devil") in the 10th century Old English Cleopatra Glossaries, about which Thomas Wright wrote: "Orcus was the name for Pluto, the god of the infernal regions, hence we can easily understand the explanation of hel-deofol. Orc, in Anglo-Saxon, like thyrs, means a spectre, or goblin." (Note: The Corpus Glossary (Corpus Christi College MS. 144, late 8th to early 9th century) has the two glosses: "orcus, orc" and "orcus, ðyrs, hel-diobul.Pheifer 1974, p. 37n)

The term is used just once in Beowulf, as the plural compound orcneas, in the sense of a tribe of monstrous beings descended from Cain, alongside the elves and ettins (giants), who were condemned by God:

| þanon untydras ealle onwocon eotenas ond ylfe ond orcneas swylce gigantas þa wið gode wunnon lange þrage he him ðæs lean forgeald —Beowulf, Fitt I, vv. 111–14 | Thence all evil broods were born, ogres and elves and evil spirits —the giants also, who long time fought with God, for which he gave them their reward —John R. Clark Hall, tr. (1901) |

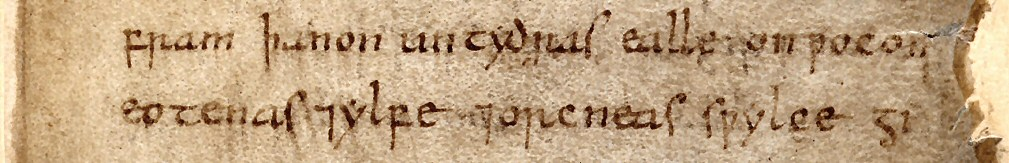
Beowulf's eotenas ond ylfe ond orcneas, "ogres and elves and demon-corpses", inspiring Tolkien to create orcs and other races

The meaning of Orcneas is uncertain. Frederick Klaeber suggested it consisted of orc < L. orcus "the underworld" + neas "corpses", to which the translation "evil spirits" failed to do justice. (Note: Klaeber here takes orcus to be the world and not the god, as does Bosworth & Toller 1898, p. 764: "orc, es; m. The infernal regions (orcus)", though the latter seems to predicate on synthesizing the compound "Orcþyrs" by altering the reading of the Cleopatra glossaries as given by Wright's Voc. ii. that he sources.) It is generally supposed to contain an element -né, cognate to Gothic naus and Old Norse nár, both meaning 'corpse'. (Note: The usual Old English word for corpse is líc, but -né appears in nebbed 'corpse bed', and in dryhtné 'dead body of a warrior', where dryht is a military unit.) If *orcné is to be glossed as orcus 'corpse', then the compound word can be construed as "demon-corpses", or "corpse from Orcus (i.e. the underworld)". Hence orc-neas may have been some sort of walking dead monster, a product of ancient necromancy, or a zombie-like creature.

== Tolkien ==
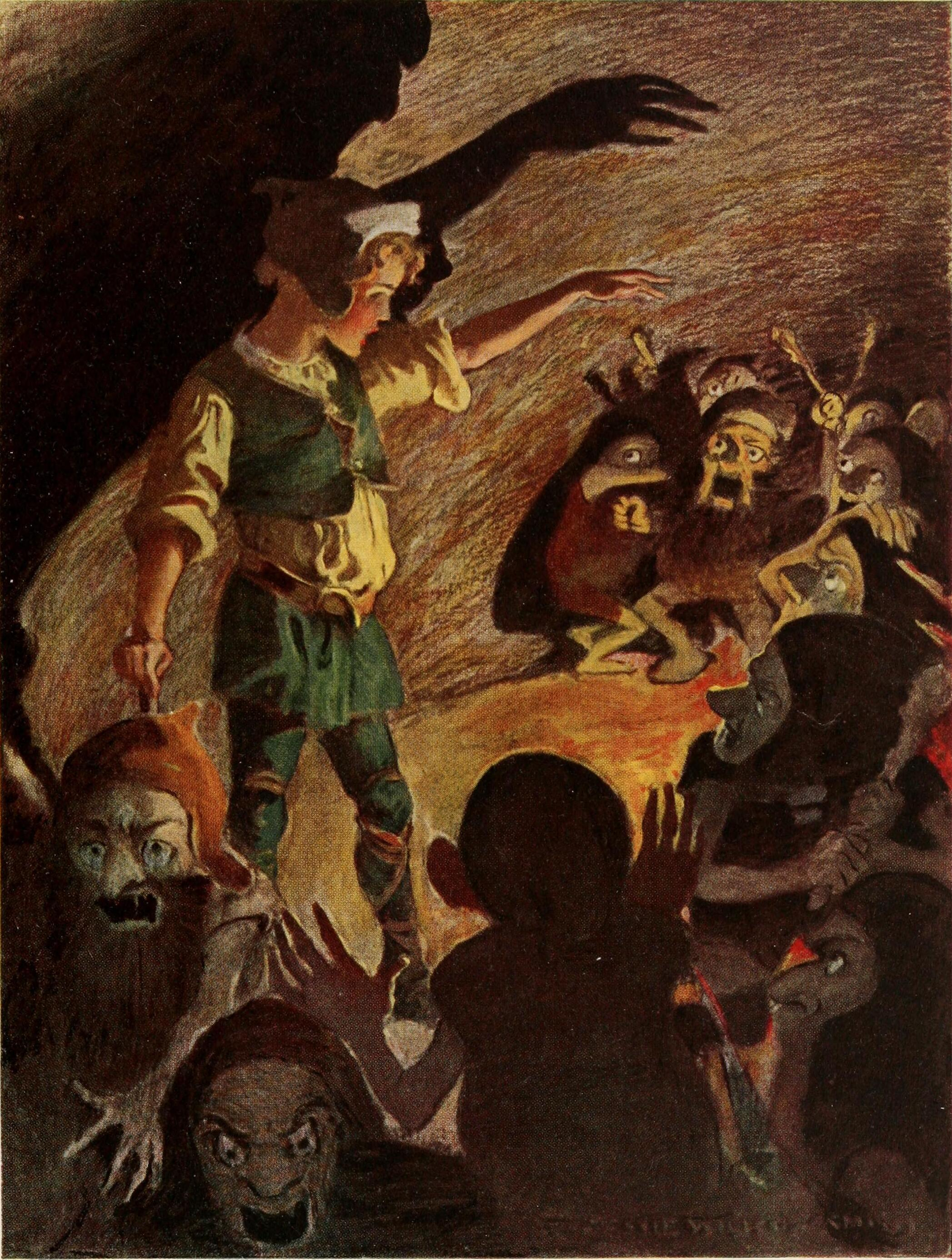
Tolkien wrote that his orcs were influenced by the goblins in George MacDonald's 1872 The Princess and the Goblin. Illustration "The goblins fell back a little when he began, and made horrible grimaces" by Jessie Willcox Smith, 1920

The term "orc" is used only once in the first edition of Tolkien's 1937 The Hobbit, which preferred the term "goblins". "Orc" was later used ubiquitously in The Lord of the Rings. (Note: Tolkien 1937, p. 149, n9) The "orc-" element occurs in The Hobbit in the sword name Orcrist, (Note: Thorin Oakenshield's Elvish sword from Gondolin.) which is given as its Elvish language name, and glossed as "Goblin-cleaver". (Note: Tolkien 1937, ch. 4 "Over Hill and Under Hill")

=== Stated etymology ===
Tolkien began the more modern use of the English term "orc" to denote a race of evil humanoid beings. His earliest Elvish dictionaries include the entry Ork (orq-) "monster", "ogre", "demon", together with orqindi and "ogresse". He sometimes used the plural form orqui in his early texts. (Note: Parma Eldalamberon volume XII: "Quenya Lexicon Quenya Dictionary": 'Ork' ('orq-') monster, ogre, demon. "orqindi" ogresse. [The original reading of the second entry was >'orqinan' ogresse.< Perhaps the intended meaning of the earlier form was 'region of ogres'; cf. 'kalimban', 'Hisinan'. 'The Poetic and Mythologic Words of Eldarissa' gives 'ork' 'ogre, giant' and 'orqin' 'ogress', which may be a feminine form. ...]") He stated that the Elvish words for orc were derived from a root ruku, "fear, horror"; in Quenya, orco, plural orkor; in Sindarin orch, plurals yrch and Orchoth (as a class). (Note: Tolkien 1994, Appendix C "Elvish names for the Orcs", pp. 289–391) They had similar names in other Middle-earth languages: uruk in Black Speech; in the language of the Drúedain gorgûn, "ork-folk"; in Khuzdul rukhs, plural rakhâs; and in the language of Rohan and in the Common Speech, orka.

Tolkien stated in a letter to the novelist Naomi Mitchison that his orcs had been influenced by George MacDonald's The Princess and the Goblin. He explained that his word "orc" was "derived from Old English orc 'demon', but only because of its phonetic suitability", and

I originally took the word from Old English orc (Beowulf 112 orc-neas and the gloss orc: þyrs ('ogre'), heldeofol ('hell-devil')). (Note: In the Cleopatra Glossaries, Folio 69 verso; the entry is illustrated above.) This is supposed not to be connected with modern English orc, ork, a name applied to various sea-beasts of the dolphin order".

Tolkien also observed a similarity with the Latin word orcus, noting that "the word used in translation of Q[uenya] urko, S[indarin] orch is Orc. But that is because of the similarity of the ancient English word orc, 'evil spirit or bogey', to the Elvish words. There is possibly no connection between them".

=== Description ===
Orcs are of human shape, and of varying size. (Note: Tolkien 1955 book 6, ch. 1, "The Tower of Cirith Ungol") They are depicted as ugly and filthy, with a taste for human flesh. They are fanged, bow-legged and long-armed. Most are small and avoid daylight. (Note: Tolkien 1954, Book 3, ch. 3 "The Uruk-hai")

By the late Third Age, a new breed of orc had emerged from Mordor attacking Osgiliath, (Note: Tolkien 1955 Appendix A, "The Stewards" section) the Uruk-hai, larger and more powerful. Later, they were garrisoned also in Isengard serving Saruman, (Note: Tolkien 1955 Appendix F, "Of other races" section) whose Uruks were no longer afraid of daylight. Orcs eat meat, including the flesh of Men, and may indulge in cannibalism: in The Two Towers, Grishnákh, an orc from Mordor, claims that the Isengard orcs eat orc-flesh. Whether that is true or spoken in malice is uncertain: an orc flings Peregrin Took stale bread and a "strip of raw dried flesh ... the flesh of he dared not guess what creature".

Half-orcs appear in The Lord of the Rings, created by interbreeding of orcs and Men; (Note: Tolkien 1993, "Myths transformed", text X) they were able to go in sunlight. The "sly Southerner" in The Fellowship of the Ring looks "more than half like a goblin"; (Note: Tolkien 1954a, Book 1, ch. 11 "A Knife in the Dark") similar but more orc-like hybrids appear in The Two Towers "man-high, but with goblin-faces, sallow, leering, squint-eyed." (Note: Tolkien 1954, Book 3, ch. 9 "Flotsam and Jetsam")

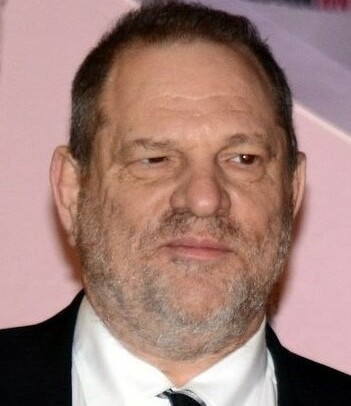
Peter Jackson had an orc modelled on the Hollywood producer Harvey Weinstein after a disagreement.

In Peter Jackson's Lord of the Rings films, the actors playing orcs are made up with masks designed to make them look evil. After a disagreement with the film producer Harvey Weinstein, Jackson had one of the masks made to resemble Weinstein, as an insult to him.

=== Orkish language ===
The Orcs had no language of their own, merely a pidgin of many various languages. However, individual tribes developed dialects that differed so widely that Westron, often with a crude accent, was used as a common language. When Sauron returned to power in Mordor in the Third Age, Black Speech was used by the captains of his armies and by his servants in his tower of Barad-dûr. A sample of debased Black Speech can be found in The Two Towers, where a "yellow-fanged" guard Orc of Mordor curses Uglúk of Isengard (an Uruk-hai chief) with the words "Uglúk u bagronk sha pushdug Saruman-glob búbhosh skai!" In The Peoples of Middle-earth, Tolkien gives the translation: "Uglúk to the cesspool, sha! the dungfilth; the great Saruman-fool, skai!" (Note: Tolkien 1996, Part One: the Prologue and Appendices to The Lord of the Rings. Draft of Appendix F.) However, in a note published in Vinyar Tengwar he gives an alternative translation: "Uglúk to the dung-pit with stinking Saruman-filth, pig-guts, gah!" Alexander Nemirovsky speculated that Tolkien might have drawn upon the language of the ancient Hittites and Hurrians for Black Speech.

=== In-fiction origins ===
The origins of orcs were explained in multiple inconsistent ways by Tolkien. Early works depict them as creations of Morgoth, mimicking the forms of the Children of Ilúvatar. Alternatively, as in The Silmarillion, they may have been East Elves, enslaved, tortured, and bred by Morgoth; or, perhaps the Avari, the Elves who refused to go to Aman, turned "evil and savage in the wild". (Note: The orcs are described as "foul broodlings of Melkor who fared abroad doing his evil work" in The Tale of Tinúviel. (Note: Tolkien 1984b, "The Tale of Tinúviel"))

The orcs "multiplied" like Elves and Men, meaning that they reproduced sexually. Tolkien stated in a letter dated 21 October 1963 to a Mrs. Munsby that "there must have been orc-women". (Note: Tolkien (1963). Letter dated 21 October 1963 to Ms. Munsby, cited in Gee, Henry. "The Science of Middle-earth: Sex and the Single Orc". TheOneRing.net.) In The Fall of Gondolin Morgoth made them of slime by sorcery, "bred from the heats and slimes of the earth". (Note: Tolkien 1984b, p. 159) Or, they were "beasts of humanized shape": possibly Elves mated with beasts, and later Men. (Note: Tolkien 1993, "Myths transformed", text VIII) Elsewhere, Tolkien wrote that they could have been fallen Maiar – perhaps a kind called Boldog, like lesser Balrogs – or corrupted Men.

Shippey writes that the orcs in The Lord of the Rings were almost certainly created just to equip Middle-earth with a continual supply of enemies who one could kill without compunction, or in Tolkien's words from The Monsters and the Critics to serve as "the infantry of the old war" ready to be slaughtered. Shippey states that orcs nevertheless share the human concept of good and evil, with a familiar sense of morality, though he notes that, like many people, orcs are quite unable to apply their morals to themselves. Shippey suggests that Tolkien, as a Catholic, took it as a given that "evil cannot make, only mock", so orcs could not have an equal and opposite morality to that of men or elves. In a 1954 letter, Tolkien wrote that orcs were "fundamentally a race of 'rational incarnate' creatures, though horribly corrupted, if no more so than many Men to be met today". (Note: Carpenter 2023, letter 153 to Peter Hastings, draft, September 1954) The scholar of English literature Robert Tally wrote in Mythlore that despite the uniform presentation of orcs as "loathsome, ugly, cruel, feared, and especially terminable", Tolkien could not resist "the urge to flesh out and 'humanize' these inhuman creatures from time to time", in the process giving them their own morality. Shippey notes that in The Two Towers, the orc Gorbag disapproves of the "regular elvish trick" (an immoral act) of abandoning a comrade, as he wrongly supposes Sam Gamgee has done to Frodo Baggins. Shippey describes the implied concept of evil as Boethian – that evil is the absence of good. He notes, however, that Tolkien did not agree with that concept of evil; Tolkien believed that evil had to be actively fought, with war if necessary. That is something that Shippey describes as representing the Manichean position – that evil coexists with good, and is at least equally as powerful.

The origins and morality of Orcs: the Catholic Tolkien's dilemma
| | Created evil? | Like animals? | Created good, but fallen? |
|---|---|---|---|
| Origin of orcs according to Tolkien | "Brooded" by Morgoth | "Beasts of humanized shape" | Fallen Maiar, or corrupted Men/Elves |
| Moral implication | Orcs are wholly evil (unlike Men). | Orcs have no power of speech and morality. | Orcs have morality just like Men. |
| Resulting problem | Orcs like Gorbag have a moral sense (even if they cannot keep to it) and can speak, which conflicts with their being wholly evil or not even sentient. Since evil cannot make, only mock, orcs cannot have an equal and opposite morality to Men. | | Orcs should be treated with mercy, where possible. |

=== Orcs and race ===
Writers including Andrew O'Hehir and the literary critic Jenny Turner have likened Tolkien's descriptions of orcs to racial stereotypes. In a private letter, Tolkien describes orcs as: (Note: Carpenter 2023, #210)

squat, broad, flat-nosed, sallow-skinned, with wide mouths and slant eyes: in fact degraded and repulsive versions of the (to Europeans) least lovely Mongol-types.

Writing for Salon.com, the journalist Andrew O'Hehir describes Tolkien's orcs as "a subhuman race [...] that is morally irredeemable and deserves only death". He adds that they are "dark-skinned and slant-eyed, and although they possess reason, speech, social organization and, as Shippey mentions, a sort of moral sensibility, they are inherently evil." O'Hehir concludes that while Tolkien's own description of orcs is a revealing representation of the "Other", it is "also the product of his background and era" and that Tolkien was not consciously "a racist or an anti-Semite", mentioning Tolkien's letters to this effect. Turner, in the London Review of Books, repeats O'Hehir's statement that orcs are "by design and intention a northern European's paranoid caricature of the races he has dimly heard about", and adds similar caveats, writing: "Tolkien does not appear to have been half as crackers on these topics [of race and race purity] as many others were. He sublimated the anxieties, perhaps, in his books."

Tally says the orcs are a demonized enemy, despite Tolkien's own objections to demonization of the enemy in the two World Wars. In a letter to his son, Christopher, who was serving in the Royal Air Force in the Second World War, Tolkien wrote of orcs as appearing on both sides of the conflict:

Yes, I think the orcs as real a creation as anything in 'realistic' fiction ... only in real life they are on both sides, of course. For 'romance' has grown out of 'allegory', and its wars are still derived from the 'inner war' of allegory in which good is on one side and various modes of badness on the other. In real (exterior) life men are on both sides: which means a motley alliance of orcs, beasts, demons, plain naturally honest men, and angels.

Tolkien rejected any suggestion of an allegorical link between orcs and Russia, stating "To ask if the orcs 'are' communists is to me as sensible as asking if communists are orcs." (Note: Carpenter 2023, #203 to Herbert Schiro, 17 November 1957)

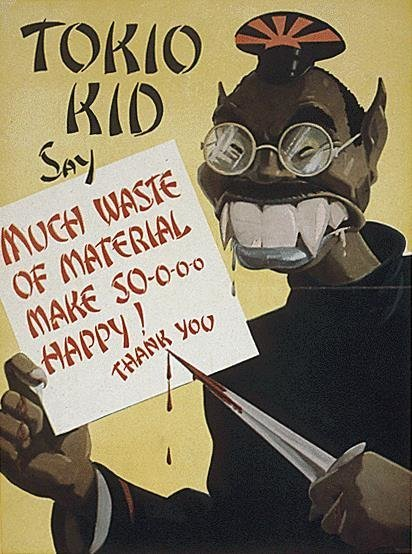
Peter Jackson's film versions of Tolkien's orcs have been compared to wartime caricatures of the Japanese (here, an American propaganda poster).

Scholars of English literature William N. Rogers II and Michael R. Underwood note that a widespread element of late 19th century Western culture was fear of moral decline and degeneration; this led to eugenics. In The Two Towers, the Ent Treebeard says: (Note: Tolkien 1954, Book 3, Ch. 4, "Treebeard")

It is a mark of evil things that came in the Great Darkness that they cannot abide the Sun; but Saruman's orcs can endure it, even if they hate it. I wonder what he has done? Are they Men he has ruined, or has he blended the races of orcs and Men? That would be a black evil!

The journalist David Ibata writes that the interpretations of orcs in Peter Jackson's Lord of the Rings films look much like "the worst depictions of the Japanese drawn by American and British illustrators during World War II". The Germanic studies scholar Sandra Ballif Straubhaar writes that there is evidence in Tolkien's writing of "a kind of racism perhaps not unremarkable in a mid-twentieth century Western man", but that this is often overstated, and must be balanced against the "polycultured, polylingual world" that is "absolutely central" to Middle-earth, as well as Tolkien's own "appalled objection" to those seeking to use his work to uphold racist ideas.

== Other fiction ==
As a response to the type-casting of orcs as generic evil characters or antagonists, some novels portray events from the point of view of the orcs, or make them more sympathetic characters. Mary Gentle's 1992 novel Grunts! presents orcs as generic infantry, used as metaphorical cannon-fodder. A series of books by Stan Nicholls, Orcs: First Blood, focuses on the conflicts between orcs and humans from the orcs' point of view. In Terry Pratchett's Discworld series, orcs are close to extinction; in his Unseen Academicals, it is said that "When the Evil Emperor wanted fighters he got some of the Igors to turn goblins into orcs" to be used as weapons in a Great War, "encouraged" by whips and beatings.

== In games ==
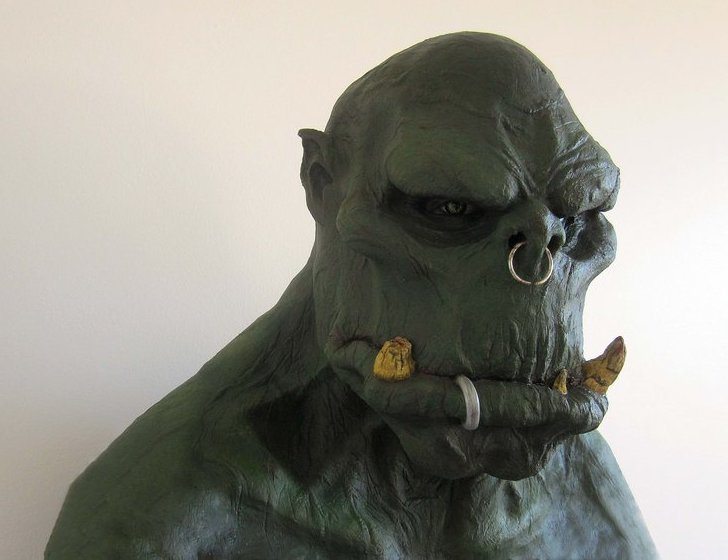
An orc from Warhammer Fantasy

Orcs based on The Lord of the Rings have become a fixture of numerous fantasy fiction and role-playing games.

=== Dungeons & Dragons ===
In the fantasy tabletop role-playing game Dungeons & Dragons (D&D), orcs are creatures in the game, and somewhat based upon those described by Tolkien. These D&D orcs are implemented in the game rules as a multi-tribed race of hostile and bestial humanoids. (Note: "Orcs gather in tribes that exert their dominance and satisfy their bloodlust by plundering villages, devouring or driving off roaming herd, and slaying any humanoids that stand against them". quoted by Young (2015), p. 96.)

The D&D orcs are endowed with muscular frames, large canine teeth like boar's tusks, and snouts rather than human-like noses. While a pug-nose ("flat-nosed") was attributable to Tolkien's written correspondence, the pig-headed (pig-faced) look was imparted on the orc by the D&D original edition (1974). It was later modified from bald-headed to hairy in subsequent editions. In the third version of the game the orc became gray-skinned, (Note: And the "Gray orc" introduced as a race.) even though a complicated color-palleted description of a (non-gray) orc had been implemented in the Monster Manual for the first edition (1977). Newer versions seem to have dropped references to skin-color.

Early versions of the game introduced the "half-orc" as race. (Note: Either the D&D first edition or Advanced D&D,) The orc was described in the first edition of Monster Manual (op. cit.), as a fiercely competitive bully, a tribal creature often dwelling and building underground; (Note: Gygax, Gary (1977) Monster Manual, TSR. Also Young (2015), p. 97, citing this and subsequent editions of MM.) in newer editions, orcs (though still described as sometimes inhabiting cavern complexes) had been shifted to become more prone to non-subterranean habitation as well, adapting captured villages into communities, for instance. The mythology and attitudes of the orcs are described in detail in Dragon #62 (June 1982), in Roger E. Moore's article, "The Half-Orc Point of View".

The orc for the D&D offshoot Pathfinder RPG are detailed in the 2008 book Classic Monsters Revisited issued by the game's publisher Paizo.

Explorer's Guide to Wildemount, a campaign setting book by Critical Role creator Matt Mercer, contains an "Orcs of Exandria" race that is portrayed differently from conventional fantasy orcs. Specifically, Orcs of Exandria "have the option to be proficient in several skills, including Animal Handling, Insight, Intimidation, Medicine, Perception, and Survival," departing from the mechanics of the canonical orc race in Volo's Guide to Monsters, which have a boosted Intimidation skill and a reduced general Intelligence stat. This has been praised for rehabilitating the orc species from its "problematic history".

=== Warcraft ===
Orcs are an important race in Warcraft, a high fantasy franchise created by Blizzard Entertainment. Several orc characters from the Warcraft universe are playable heroes in the crossover games Heroes of the Storm, developed by Blizzard Entertainment.

=== Warhammer ===
Games Workshop's Warhammer universe features cunning and brutal orcs in a fantasy setting, who are driven not so much by a need to do evil as to obtain fulfilment through the act of war. In the Warhammer 40,000 series of science-fiction games, they are a green-skinned alien species, called Orks.

=== Other products ===
The orc features in numerous Magic: The Gathering collectible cards, in the 1993 game series published by Wizards of the Coast. (Note: Wizards of the Coast acquired TSR in 1997, and subsequently published editions of D&D and Monster Manual.)

In The Elder Scrolls series, orcs began as enemy monsters, becoming a playable race in Morrowind and subsequent titles with their own nation and societal structure. In Hasbro's Heroscape products, orcs come from the pre-historic planet Grut. They are blue-skinned, with prominent tusks or horns. The Skylander Voodood from the first game in the series, Skylanders: Spyro's Adventure, is an orc.

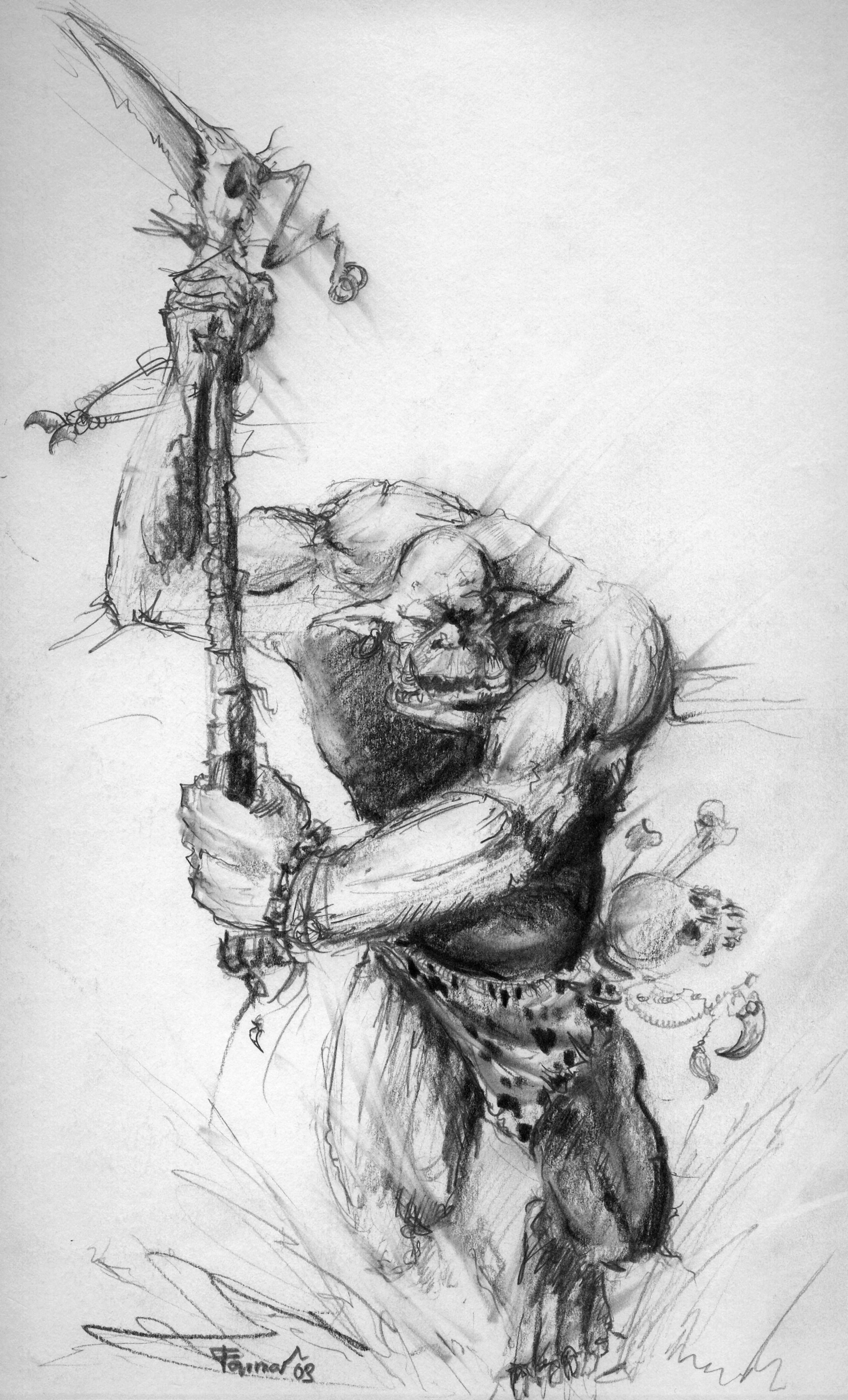
Savage orc

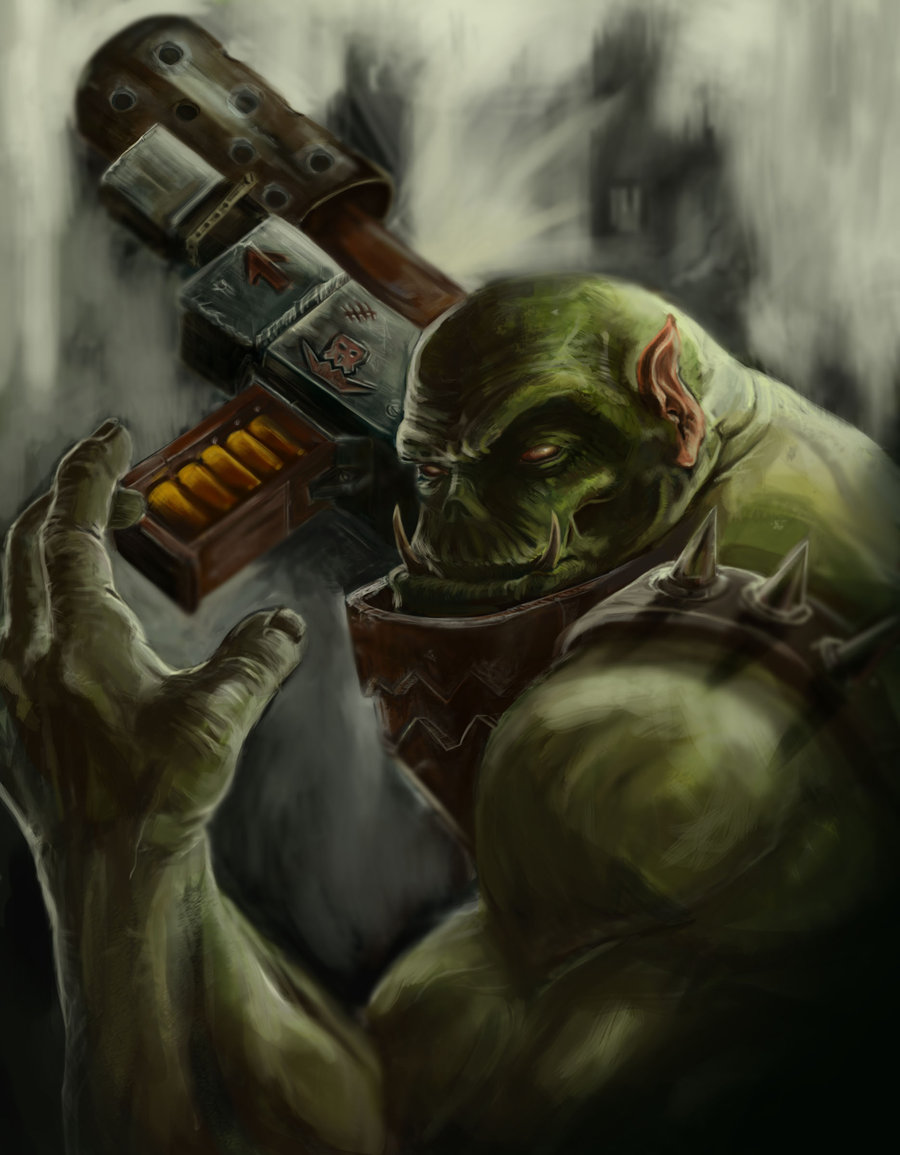
For the Love of Waaagh!, an Ork from Warhammer 40,000

== See also ==
- Haradrim – the dark-skinned "Southrons" who fought for Sauron alongside the orcs
- Orc (slang) – the modern pejorative usage of the word
- Troll (Middle-earth) – large humanoids of great strength and poor intellect, also used by Sauron
- Ork (folklore) – a Tyrol alpine folklore demon of the same name
