= Aelfric Society =

British text publication society

The Aelfric Society (Ælfric Society) was a text publication society founded in London, England, and active from 1842 to 1856, which published the Homilies of Ælfric of Eynsham (perhaps Archbishop of Canterbury, during 996–1006) and other works by Anglo-Saxon writers. It is also known as Aelfric Society Publications.

The Ælfric Society was named in honor of Ælfric of Eynsham, a Benedictine monk who wrote a Saxon grammar and dictionary (glossary). He had also translated a number of homilies and the Heptateuch into Old English. For the society, the Anglo-Saxon scholar Benjamin Thorpe (1782–1870) edited the homilies, during 1844–1846. Ælfric's Saxon grammar and glossary had been printed, nearly two hundred years earlier, at Oxford in 1639 and 1698.

The Edinburgh branch of the society operated from 87 Princes Street and was run by T G Stevenson.

== Publications ==
The Aelfric Society published several works, including:

- The Homilies of the Anglo-Saxon Church, containing Sermones Catholici or Homilies of Ælfric (2 volumes, 1844/1846)
- The Legend of Chrysanthus and Daria in Ælfric's Lives of Saints (1846)
- The Dialogue of Salomon and Saturnus (John M. Kemble, 1848)
- The Poetry of the Codex Vercellensis, with an English Translation (John M. Kemble, 1843, 212 pages)

== See also ==
- Early English Text Society
