= Heptateuch =

The Heptateuch (seven containers) is a name sometimes given to the first seven books of the Hebrew Bible. The seven books are Genesis, Exodus, Leviticus, Numbers, Deuteronomy, Joshua and Judges. The first four of these are sometimes called the Tetrateuch, the first five are commonly known as the Torah or the Pentateuch, the first six as the Hexateuch. With the addition of the Book of Ruth, these eight books are known as the Octateuch. The "Enneateuch" is the Heptateuch plus the Books of Samuel and the Books of Kings (each pair of books counted as one, and not including the Book of Ruth).

Augustine of Hippo produced a piece called Questions on the Heptateuch. Ælfric of Eynsham produced an Old English version of the Heptateuch.

Cyprianus Gallus rendered the Heptateuch into Latin verse in the 5th century.

== See also ==
- Old English Hexateuch
- Sixth and Seventh Books of Moses
