= De domiciliis =

Medieval Latin glossary

De domiciliis is a medieval, Continental European Latin-Latin glossary of domestic terminology. It was also partly copied in early medieval England, contributing items to the glossaries in the Antwerp-London Glossaries and to London, British Library, Harley 3826.

== Editions ==
- C. Huelsen, 'Die angebliche mittlealterliche Beschreibung des Palatins', Mitteilungen des kaiserlichen deutschen Archaeologischen Instituts Römische Abteilung, 17 (1902), 255–68.
