= Octateuch =

First eight books of the Bible

The Octateuch (/ˈɒktətjuːk/, from Ancient Greek: ἡ ὀκτάτευχος, romanized: he oktateuchos, lit. 'eight-part book') is a traditional name for the first eight books of the Bible, comprising the Pentateuch, plus the Book of Joshua, the Book of Judges and the Book of Ruth. These texts make up the first eight books of the Septuagint, which provided the ordering used in traditional Christian Bibles. This order is different from that of the Masoretic Text of the Jewish Bible, where Ruth is considered part of the third section of the canon, the Ketuvim, and is found after the Song of Songs, being the second of the Five Megillot.

The Ethiopian Beta Israel Jewish community also uses parts of the Octateuch and includes the Five Megillot, which all together makes up the Orit (from Imperial Aramaic: אורייתא, romanized: ˀorāytā, lit. 'written law, Torah').

== See also ==
- Seraglio Octateuch
- Hexateuch
- Heptateuch
- Books of the Bible
- Sixth and Seventh Books of Moses
