= Letter to Sigeweard =

Book about the Bible written 1005–6

The Letter to Sigeweard, also known as Libellus de Veteri Testamento et Novo ('A short book on the Old and New Testament') (written c. 1005–6), by Ælfric of Eynsham (d. c. 1010), is, in the words of Hugh Magennis, 'the earliest extended discussion of the Bible, considered as a whole, in a western vernacular language and is one of the major discussions of the Bible in medieval English'.

== Editions and translations ==
- Marsden, Richard (ed.). The Old English Heptateuch and Ælfric's "Libellus de veteri testamento et novo". Early English Text Society; 330. Oxford: Oxford U. P., 2008.
- Brandon W. Hawk (trans.), 'Ælfric’s Libellus de Veteri Testamento et Novi: A Translation' (29 May 2015).
- Ælfric of Eynsham's Letter to Sigeweard: An Edition, Commentary, and Translation, ed. and trans. by Larry Swain (Witan Publishing, 2017), ISBN 9781386074472.
