= Harley Glossary =

Old English glossary

The Harley Glossary is an Anglo-Saxon glossary, mostly providing glosses on Latin words.

== Manuscripts ==
The Glossary mainly survives in the fragmentary British Library, MS Harley 3376 (which preserves the first six alphabetical sections, from "A" to "F"), but two fragments of letter "I" section are also found in Lawrence, University of Kansas, Kenneth Spenser Research Library, Pryce P2 A: 1, and Oxford, Bodleian Library, Lat. Misc. a. 3., fol. 49. The manuscript was produced in western England in the eleventh century, and has been argued to have been produced at Worcester Cathedral.

== Content ==
About two-thirds of the glosses are themselves in Latin, while about a third are in Old English. In the assessment of Jessica Cooke, 'it appears that the compiler wished to emphasise the Latin element of his work as opposed to the vernacular, and wrote the Latin words in large letters on the ruled lines of the pages, while according the English a lower status in smaller writing between the lines. In addition, he reversed the usual trend by re-translating some Old English glosses from his exemplars back into Latin'. Cooke found that about half the entries in the glossary derive from earlier Anglo-Saxon glossaries, with the closest parallels being afforded by the Corpus Glossary of c. 800 and the Cleopatra Glossaries of the tenth century: about two-thirds of the material in the latter appears in the Harley Glossary.

== Editions and facsimiles ==
- Jessica Cooke, "The Harley Manuscript 3376: A Study in Anglo-Saxon Glossography" (Unpublished PhD thesis, Cambridge, 1994): the principal edition
- The Harley Latin-Old English Glossary Edited from British Museum MS Harley 3376, ed. by Robert T. Oliphant, Janua Linguarum, Series Practica 20 (The Hague: Mouton, 1966): the edition preceding Cooke's
- Luisa Mucciante & Edoardo Scarpanti, La sezione del glossario Harley 3376 contenuta nei fogli di Oxford e Lawrence (Alessandria: Edizioni dell'Orso, 2012); ISBN 9788862743396: the two fragments from original letter "I" section, now at Kansas University Library and Bodleian Library
- Digital facsimile at the British Library
