= Elise Otté =

Anglo-Danish linguist and historian (1818–1903)

Elise Charlotte Otté
- Born: 30 September 1818; Copenhagen, Denmark
- Died: 20 December 1903 (aged 85); Richmond, London
- Education: Harvard University
- Employer: University of St Andrews

Elise Charlotte Otté (30 September 1818 – 20 December 1903) was an Anglo-Danish linguist, scholar and historian. She completed a number of translations into English from different languages. She assisted her step-father in translating the Norse poems known as the Elder Edda.

== Early life ==
Otté was born in Copenhagen on 30 September 1818, to a Danish father and an English mother called Mary Anne. In 1820, she moved with her parents to the island of Saint Croix (then Sankt Croix of the Danish West Indies). When her father died, she and her mother returned to Denmark.

== Education ==
In Copenhagen, her mother met and married a British man, English philologist Benjamin Thorpe, and together, the family moved to England. Thorpe taught his step-daughter several modern languages as well as Icelandic and Old English to the point that she was able to assist his grammatical work, but they clashed on a personal level and she found him oppressive. In 1840, she moved to Boston, United States for some independence and to teach in a family. Later she studied science, including geology, physiology and anatomy at Harvard University. She also spent time on a tour of Europe.

== Academic career ==
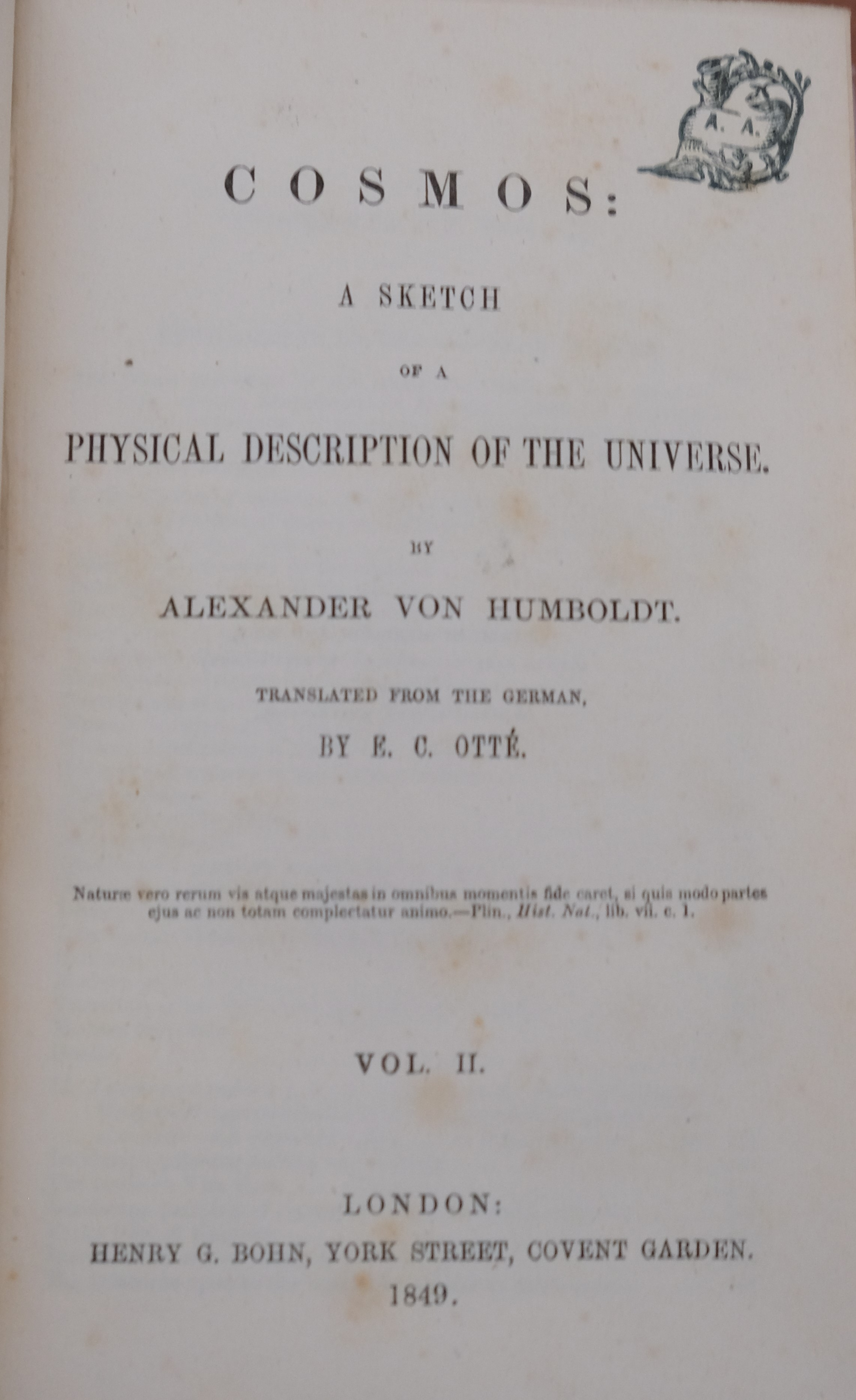
Title page to volume 1 of Alexander von Humboldt's "Cosmos: A Sketch of a Physical Description of the Universe," translated by Otté (1849)

She later returned to her step-father's and she assisted his translation of the Elder Edda. She found life with him intolerable, however, and in 1849, she moved to Scotland and worked at the University of St Andrews translating for George Edward Day. Otte was again assisting an academic who was older than her. When Day retired in 1863, she moved with Day and his wife to Torquay until his death in 1872. She continued her career from London, writing in scientific periodicals, but also publishing a monograph, Scandinavian history, in 1874. This work of academic study had lasting impact and it was reprinted up to 1939 under the title of "Norway, Sweden and Denmark" which matched the title of her 1881 work "Denmark and Iceland". Her breadth and depth of knowledge enabled her to publish a range of works. She translated a number of books from German by Alexander von Humboldt and another by the historian Johann Martin Lappenberg. Her range of skills enabled her to also translate the scientific Rambles of a Naturalist on the Coast of Spain, France and Sicily by the biologist Jean Louis Armand de Quatrefages de Bréau which was written in French.

In 1884 she published grammars of both Danish and Swedish as well as textbooks aimed at students of German in 1859 and of Danish in 1879.

She died at Richmond on 20 December 1903, aged 85.

== Notable works ==
- Scandinavian history. London, Macmillan & Co., 1874.
- Denmark and Iceland. London: S. Low, Marston, Searle, & Rivington, 1881.
- A simplified grammar of the Danish language. London: Trübner & Co., 1883.
- A simplified grammar of the Swedish language. London: Trübner & Co., 1884.
- Norway, Sweden and Denmark. edited by Edward Samuel Corwin. Polar research by G.T. Surface. Chicago : H.W. Snow, [c1910]

=== Translations ===
- Views of nature, or, Contemplations on the sublime phenomena of creation by Alexander von Humboldt. With Henry G. Bohn. London: H.G. Bohn, 1850.
- Cosmos: A Sketch of a Physical Description of the Universe by Alexander von Humboldt. London: H. G. Bohn, 1851
- The rambles of a naturalist on the coasts of France, Spain, and Sicily by Jean Louis Armand de Quatrefages de Bréau. London: Longman, Brown, Green, Longmans, & Roberts, 1857.
- Pictures of Old England by Reinhold Pauli. Cambridge, London, Macmillan and Co., 1861.
