= Orcs: First Blood =

1999-2000 series of books by Stan Nicholls

Orcs
- American edition
- Author: Stan Nicholls
- Original title: Orcs: First Blood
- Cover artist: for the original edition, Chris Baker
- Country: UK
- Language: English
- Genre: fantasy
- Published: 1999–2000
- No. of books: 3

Orcs: First Blood (variant title: Orcs (2004)) is a series of books written by Stan Nicholls. It includes: Bodyguard of Lightning, Legion of Thunder and Warriors of the Tempest. The books focus on the conflicts between a group of orcs and humans, but through the unconventional view of the orcs. The trilogy, first printed in the United Kingdom by Victor Gollancz Ltd, has become international bestseller, with over one million copies sold and the first two books, Bodyguard of Lightning and Legion of Thunder, received Best Novel nominations at the 1999 British Fantasy Awards. The sequel of Orcs: First Blood is Orcs: Bad Blood, which includes Bad Blood: Weapons of Magical Destruction, Bad Blood: Army of Shadows and Bad Blood: Inferno.

== Background and release ==
I owe thanks to Steve Jackson and Heather Matuozzo, for their friendship and encouraging laugh; to Harry and Helen Knibb, for their unparalleled knowledge about the internet and for their kindness; to Sandy Auden, for her wisdom and because he went on; to Simon Spanton, the firm arm from the editorial helm, and to Nicola Sinclair, for her ability in the publicity field, rather than professional.
The series of adventures of the orcs is dedicated to Marianne Gay and Nick Fifer, for their happiness and because they are a source of inspiration full of affection.

— Stan Nicholls

Asked why he has written about orcs, Nicholls has answered with "When I was thinking of writing about orcs, my mind turned to the well known adage about how it's winners who write the history books.
Orcs have featured in European folklore for hundreds of years, and they've popped up in various works of fiction from as early as the 15th."

The first volume, Bodyguard of Lightning, was first published in the UK in February 1999. The second volume, Legion of Thunder appeared in October 1999 and the third, Warriors of the Tempest, in November 2000. The books were published by Gollancz (Victor Gollancz Ltd).

The novel was published in other countries, in the form of 3 books or omnibus, including: The United States of America, Bulgaria, China, The Czech Republic, Germany, The Netherlands, France, Italy, Poland, Russia, Spain and Romania.

Audiobook versions of trilogies Orcs: First Blood and Orcs: Bad Blood, read by John Lee, are being released by US company Tantor Media in 2010/2011.

== Setting ==
The setting of the story is the mythical world of Maras Dantia, which is populated by Humans, Orcs, Elves, Dwarves, Goblins, Centaurs, Halflings, Leprechauns, Faeries, Trolls, Dragons, Unicorns, and many other staple creatures of the Fantasy genre. There is a war raging between the polytheistic Manis (who worship many gods) and the monotheistic Unis (who follow a religion analogous to Puritan Christianity). The orcs dislike humans, who have brought farming and industry to Maras Dantia, as well as the Uni religion. The presence of humans in Maras Dantia is also killing the land, every year the glaciers advance farther from the north, and the magic is literally draining out of the ground itself.

== Plot ==
Stryke, the leader of the warband of orc soldiers.

The story follows the adventures of a warband of orc soldiers, the Wolverines, led by Stryke, a Captain in the Orcish Horde. His lieutenants are Haskeer, a foul tempered and not too bright orc; Coilla, a clever female orc who is also the warband's newest recruit; Jup, a dwarf mercenary, who is disliked by Haskeer due to his race (and the fact that Dwarves fight for both sides); and Alfray, an old and wise orc who also acts as the warband's standard bearer and medic.

The story begins with the wolverines having been sent on a mission by an evil queen, Jennesta, (to whom they have been enslaved) to recover an ancient artifact from a human settlement. Along with the artifact, the orcs discover a stash of pellucid, a potent narcotic, and after the battle, Stryke, their leader, allows them to use some of it to boost morale. During the night, he dreams that he meets an orc female in a world where only orcs live, without humans or dwarfs. Due to their delay, the impulsive and insane Jennesta becomes convinced that she has been betrayed, and so she orders another group of orcs, aided by a dragon, to hunt them down and capture them.

Realising they are now being hunted by both sides, Stryke decides that the group must capture a similar artifact from another settlement to use as a bargaining chip for their lives. They set out to infiltrate a human settlement run by a Uni fundamentalist named Howbrow. Using a member of the group who is a dwarf to gain access to the town, the orcs are able to steal a second artifact, which they call "stars" due to their pointy shape, at the same time, they foil Howbrows plot to kill off all the non-human races in Maras Dantia using a poison created from plants being grown in the town's greenhouse, causing him to chase them with an army of his own.

Soon, the group learns that there are five "stars", that they can be fitted together so perfectly that they cannot be taken apart and that they grant those who possess them great power, although the nature of the power is not known. Stryke continues to have dreams where he meets the same orc female, and sees more of her world where orcs are the dominant species. The Wolverines decide that, to survive, they must acquire all the artifacts. One is in the possession of a Mani settlement, where it is revered as a religious artifact, another in the hands of a group of subterranean trolls, while yet another is owned by a group of centaurs, who agree to trade their star, or instrumentality, the name given to them by their creator, for the tear of Jennesta's equally evil sister, Adpar. This is due to the healing powers it would bestow, as the leader of the centaurs was crippled by Adpar's magic.

The group's quest to steal all the "stars" and evade capture by all sides, takes them across the land of Maras Dantia, with Jennesta's forces in hot pursuit. Eventually, after much hardship, and with many of the group killed, the orcs acquire all the artefacts, and learn that they will open a portal to many alternate versions of Maras Dantia, in each of which, the dominant species is different (dwarfs, humans, orcs), and that the fact that all species occupying a single plane of existence is due to a magical accident, as a result of which, the land itself is "dying" and magic is draining away.

== "The Taking" ==
"The Taking" is a short story which serves as a prequel to the events of First Blood. It begins with the wolverines choosing a new corporal for their warband, settling on Coilla. The events of the story take place on Braetagg's Day, a holy day in orc culture, and the orcs must work to retrieve the mummified corpse of the great orc leader Braetagg, which has been stolen by the Pyros, a sect of humans who worship fire. Haskeer and Jup find Braetagg's mummy, but are captured by Pyros, and must be rescued by the rest of the warband. The Wolverines return to Cairnbarrow with the corpse, whereupon Haskeer accidentally knocks its arm off while patting it on the back.

"The Taking" originally appeared in the anthology Swords Against the Millennium, edited by Mike Chinn (Alchemy Press/Saladoth Productions; September 2000). "The Taking" was shortlisted for the 2001 British Fantasy Award, and has since been reprinted in a number of magazines and anthologies worldwide.

== Reception ==
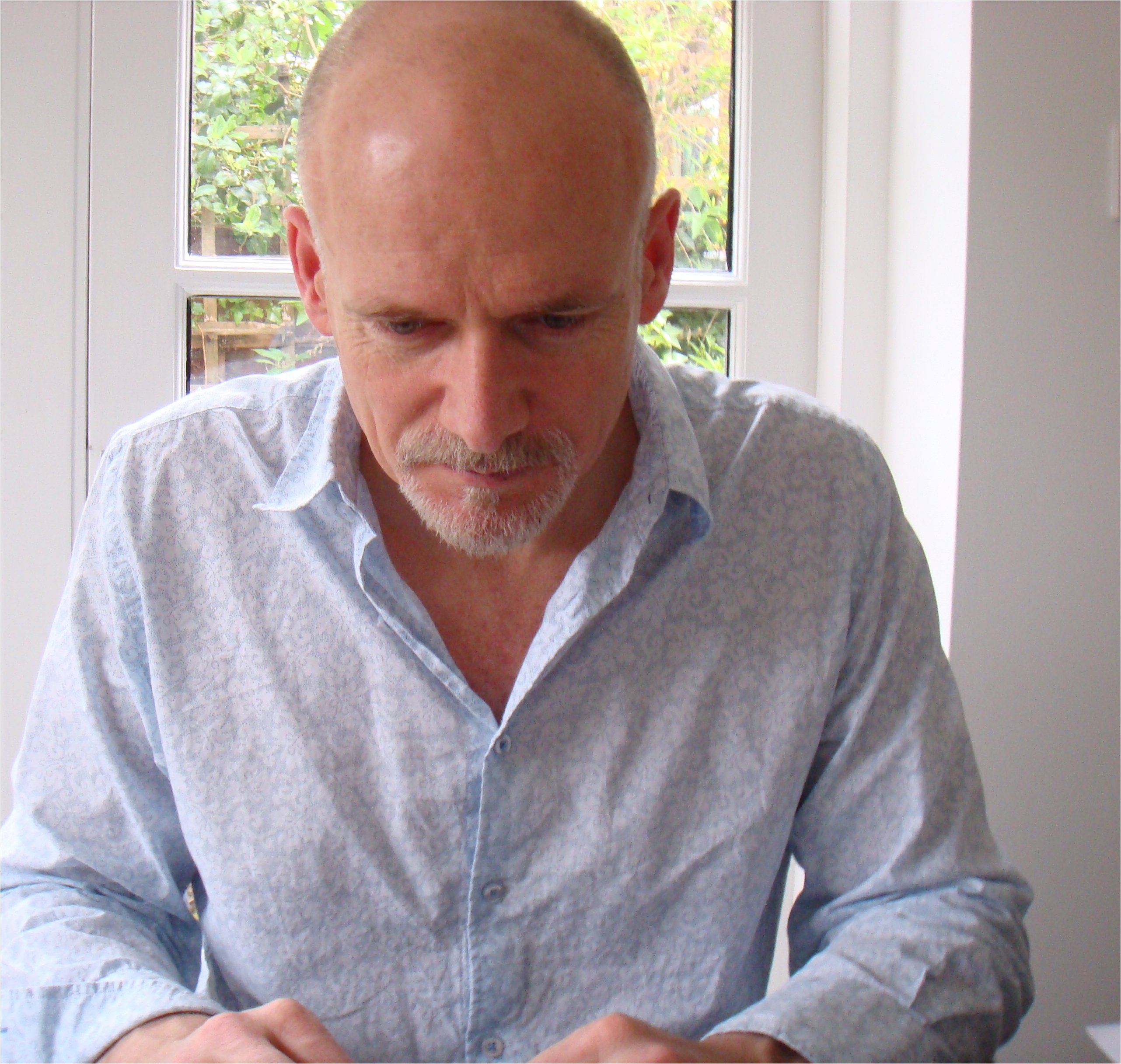
Jon Courtenay Grimwood compares the Orcs with The Lord of the Rings.

A warning: if you don't wish to become addicted to the most impressive new fantasy sequence in many a moon, you should avoid Bodyguard of Lightning.

— Barry Forshaw, Genre Hotline/LineOne Science Fiction Zone

The trilogy, first printed in the United Kingdom by Victor Gollancz Ltd, has become international bestseller, with over one million copies sold. The first two volumes were nominated for the 2000 British Fantasy Award (Best Novel category). The success of the novel has begun as crazy in Germany. In the UK, sales have been respectable but not spectacular.

I’ve had a lot of criticism from some people for daring to write about orcs at all. There are Tolkien fans who think I must be ripping him off, or trying to add something to his work.

— Stan Nicholls

... a neat idea and Stan Nicholls pulls it off with great panache ... enough weird sex to keep the tabloids outraged for weeks. You'll never feel the same about Lord of the Rings.

— Jon Courtenay Grimwood, SFX magazine

Again, Nicholls brilliantly re-invents the Orcs, underdogs of fantasy fiction, and creates a dazzling panoply of wit, invention and violence. The humour is perfectly judged, and it's refreshing to encounter a fantasy writer clearly in possession of a fierce intelligence.

— Barry Forshaw, Genre Hotline/LineOne Science Fiction Zone

The first two books in the Orcs series proved that although Nicholls' gimmick is an original one, there's more to the desperate Maras-Dantia greenskins than just a cool reversal of fantasy stereotypes. ... The action doesn't let up as Stryke and his weathered warband approach the end of their mission... Nicholls' talent has imbued traditionally brutal characters with a gruff nobility and the end of this novel is a fittingly bitter and convincing coda to this highly original saga.

— Waterstone's Online

== Sequel ==
The sequel of Orcs: First Blood is Orcs: Bad Blood, which includes Bad Blood: Weapons of Magical Destruction, Bad Blood: Army of Shadows and Bad Blood: Inferno. The books have been published (in the UK) by Gollancz. The first volume, Weapons of Magical Destruction, was published in the UK in December 2008; volume two, Army of Shadows, appeared in October 2009. Inferno, the final volume, was published in the UK on 29 December 2011 (the German edition, from Heyne, is already out, and the US edition, from Orbit, appears in April). (By 2010 the first trilogy, and books 1 and 2 of the second trilogy, had achieved over 80,000 UK library borrowings.) The omnibus was released in 2013.

=== Plot ===
At the novel's start, orc leader Stryke and his retired warband, the Wolverines, are living an idyllic, if slightly boring, life in Ceragan, the orcs' true dimension. While Stryke and his buddy Haskeer are out hunting, they encounter a startling magical lightshow that heralds the appearance of someone arriving in their dimension. The human envoy dies only moments after arriving (due to a bad case of Knife in the Back), but he carries an enchanted stone that relays a message to the startled orcs: in yet another dimension, orcs are being brutalized and tortured by an invading human force, and they need a heroic band to step in and save them.

== Possible adaptations ==
Asked in an interview in November 2008 if he can imagine Orcs: First Blood on film, Nicholls answered:

One of the major Hollywood studios is talking to my agent at the moment, and another, European, studio has expressed interest. But I’m not even thinking about it. I’ve been on this merry dance before. I’ve had books optioned by film companies and then dropped. It’s a much more common experience for writers than you might think, but it almost always comes to nothing. So a movie would be nice, but I’m not holding my breath.

=== Graphic novel ===
In the same interview, Stan Nicholls said:

A project that has finally happened is the Orcs graphic novel. I recently finished writing the story for that, and the book’s going to be published by First Second Books in America. It’s an entirely new story, not an adaptation of any of the novels. The working title is Fit For Purpose, and the story takes place before the events in the first trilogy. Stryke and the Wolverines are in it, and so are a number of other characters from First Blood, but the rest is different.

The graphic novel was eventually released in 2013 under the title Orcs: Forged for War.

== List of books ==
- Orcs: First Blood (2004, omnibus edition of the First Blood trilogy)
  - First Blood: Bodyguard of Lightning (1999)
  - First Blood: Legion of Thunder (1999)
  - First Blood: Warriors of Tempest (2000)
- Orcs Bad Blood: The Second Omnibus (2013, omnibus edition of the Bad Blood trilogy)
  - Bad Blood: Weapons of Magical Destruction (2008, Titled "Orcs: Bad Blood" in America)
  - Bad Blood: Army of Shadows (2009)
  - Bad Blood: Inferno (2011)
- Orcs: Forged for War (2013, original graphic novel, illustrated by Joe Flood)
