= Excerptiones Prisciani =

Tenth-century Latin text

The Excerptiones Prisciani (also known as Excerptiones de Prisciano) is a tenth-century compilation of Priscian's Institutiones grammaticae and Donatus's Ars maior.

== History ==
It is found in three manuscripts: Antwerp, Plantin-Moretus Museum, MS 16.2 (where it is accompanied by the Antwerp-London Glossaries); Paris, Bibliothèque Nationale, nouv. acq. lat. 586; and Chartres, Bibliothèque municipale, 56. It is thought to have been compiled by (or under the supervision of) the early medieval English monk and scholar Ælfric of Eynsham, and was the basis for the Latin grammar that he wrote in Old English. In compiling his text, Ælfric was working in a Carolingian scholarly tradition of adapting Classical works on grammar.
