= Cleopatra Glossaries =

Old English glossaries

The first page of the First Cleopatra Glossary

The Cleopatra Glossaries are three Latin-Old English glossaries all found in the manuscript Cotton Cleopatra A.iii (once held in the Cotton library, now held in the British Library). The glossaries constitute important evidence for Old English vocabulary, as well as for learning and scholarship in early medieval England generally. The manuscript was probably written at St Augustine's, Canterbury, and has generally been dated to the mid-tenth century, though recent work suggests the 930s specifically.

The glossaries have no connection with Cleopatra herself: they are so named because when kept in the library of Sir Robert Bruce Cotton, the volume containing them was stored in a bookcase below a bust of Cleopatra.

== Content ==
The First Cleopatra Glossary (folios 5r–75v) is alphabeticised by first letter, drawing on a wide range of sources, including a glossary more or less identical to the Third Cleopatra Glossary, material related to the Corpus Glossary, and a glossed text of Isidore of Seville's Etymologiae. Some of these sources are among the earliest glosses in English, but the Cleopatra reviser (or his source) often revised them. The glossary only gets as far as P: the compilation or copying seems never to have been completed.

The Second Cleopatra Glossary (folios 76r–91v) contains a shorter glossary, organised by subject. A closely related glossary is found in the first three subject lists of the Brussels Glossary (Brussels, Royal Library, 1928–30).

The Third Cleopatra Glossary (folios 92r–117v) contains glosses to Aldhelm's Prosa de virginitate and Carmen de virginitate, with the lemmata in the same order as they appear in the text. It was presumably, therefore, based on a copy of Aldhelm's texts which had interlinear glosses. This glossary or one like it was influential, influencing Byrhtferth of Ramsey and at least one Anglo-Saxon medical text. Kittlick's linguistic investigation showed that some, at least, of the glosses in the Third Cleopatra Glossary are in the Anglian dialect of Old English, with later overlays from West Saxon and Kentish (probably in that order). The glossary—though not necessarily all its entries—must have originated in the eighth century.

About two thirds of the material in the Cleopatra Glossaries also occurs in the later Harley Glossary.
