= Benjamin Thorpe =

English scholar (1782-1870)

Benjamin Thorpe (1782 – 19 July 1870) was an English scholar of Anglo-Saxon literature.

== Biography ==
In the early 1820s he worked as a banker in the House of Rothschild, in Paris. There he met Thomas Hodgkin, who treated him for tuberculosis.

After studying for four years at Copenhagen University, under the Danish philologist Rasmus Christian Rask, Thorpe returned to England in 1830. In a few years he established a reputation as an Anglo-Saxon scholar.

In recognition of unremunerative work, Thorpe was granted a civil list pension of £160 in 1835, and on 17 June 1841 this was increased to £200 per annum. He was a Fellow of the Society of Antiquaries of London, a member of the Royal Academy of Sciences at Munich, and of the Society of Netherlandish Literature at Leyden He died at Chiswick in July 1870.

== Bibliography ==
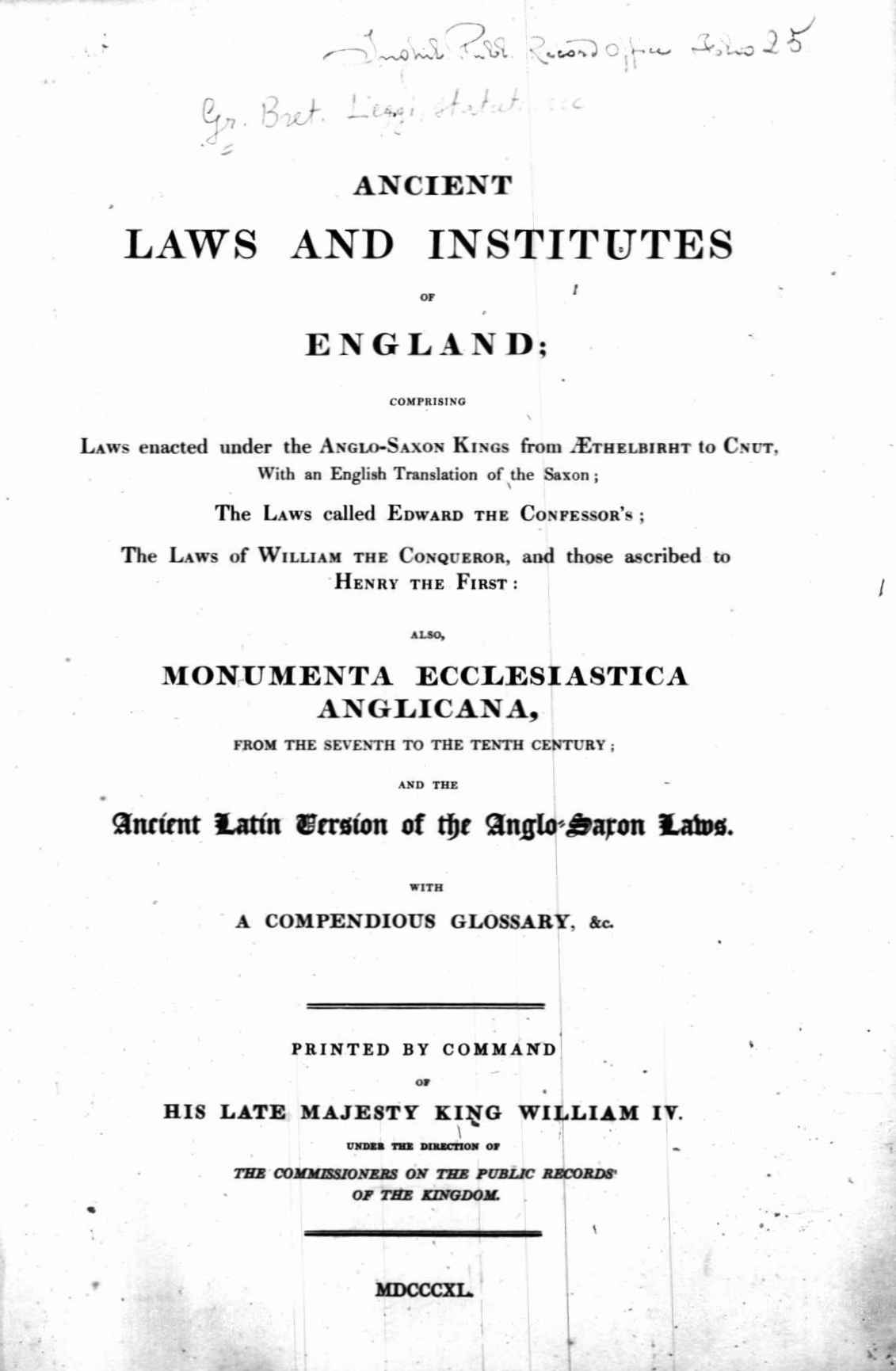
Ancient laws and institutes of England, 1840

In 1830 Thorpe brought out at Copenhagen an English version of Rask's Anglo-Saxon Grammar (a second edition of this appeared at London). That same year he moved to London with his new wife Mary Otte and her daughter Elise Otté. Thorpe educated and oppressed his step daughter and she had a troubled relationship and unattributed partnership with him throughout his life.

In 1832 he published at London Cædmon's Metrical Paraphrase of Parts of the Holy Scriptures in Anglo-Saxon; with an English Translation, Notes, and a Verbal Index, which was well reviewed. It was followed in 1834 by the Anglo-Saxon Version of the Story of Apollonius of Tyre and by Analecta Anglo-Saxonica, a textbook which was adopted at Oxford by Robert Meadows White. The Analecta was used, with Vernon's Anglo-Saxon Guide, for 40 years.

In 1835 Thorpe published Libri Psalmorum Versio antiqua Latina and then Ancient Laws and Institutes of England (1840). Two more volumes were published by Thorpe in 1842, The Holy Gospels in Anglo-Saxon and Codex Exoniensis, a Collection of Anglo-Saxon Poetry, with English Translation and Notes, an edition of the poems in the Exeter Book with English translation. Next came, for the Ælfric Society, The Homilies of the Anglo-Saxon Church,' with an English version, published in ten parts between 1843 and 1846.

In 1834 Thorpe had begun a translation of Johann Martin Lappenberg's works on old English history, but was deterred. By 1842 he had started another version, with alterations, corrections, and notes of his own; it was published in two volumes in 1845 as A History of England under the Anglo-Saxon Kings. It was followed eventually by a version of Lappenberg's History of England under the Norman Kings (1857). Thorpe's two-volume edition of Florence of Worcester was issued in 1848–49.

For the publisher Edward Lumley Thorpe produced Northern Mythology (1851) with notes and illustrations. It was followed in 1853 by Yule Tide Stories which appeared in Bohn's Antiquarian Library. For the same library he translated in 1854 Pauli's Life of Alfred the Great, with Alfred's Anglo-Saxon version of Orosius. In 1855 appeared Thorpe's Anglo-Saxon Poems of Beowulf, with parallel prose translation, notes, glossary, and indexes. He had planned this work as early as 1830, and his text was collated with the Cottonian MS before John Mitchell Kemble's; the scorched edges of the manuscript suffered further shortly afterwards.

In 1861 Thorpe edited for the Rolls Series of The Anglo-Saxon Chronicle, according to the several Authorities. In the first volume are printed synoptically the Corpus Christi, Cambridge, the Bodleian, and the various Cottonian texts, with facsimiles and notes, while in volume two appeared the translation. Four years later, through the support of Joseph Mayer of Liverpool, Thorpe was able to publish his supplement to Kemble's Codex Diplomaticus ævi Saxonici. His final work, done for Trübner in 1866, was a translation of the Elder Edda.
