= Old English Hexateuch =

11th-century biblical translation

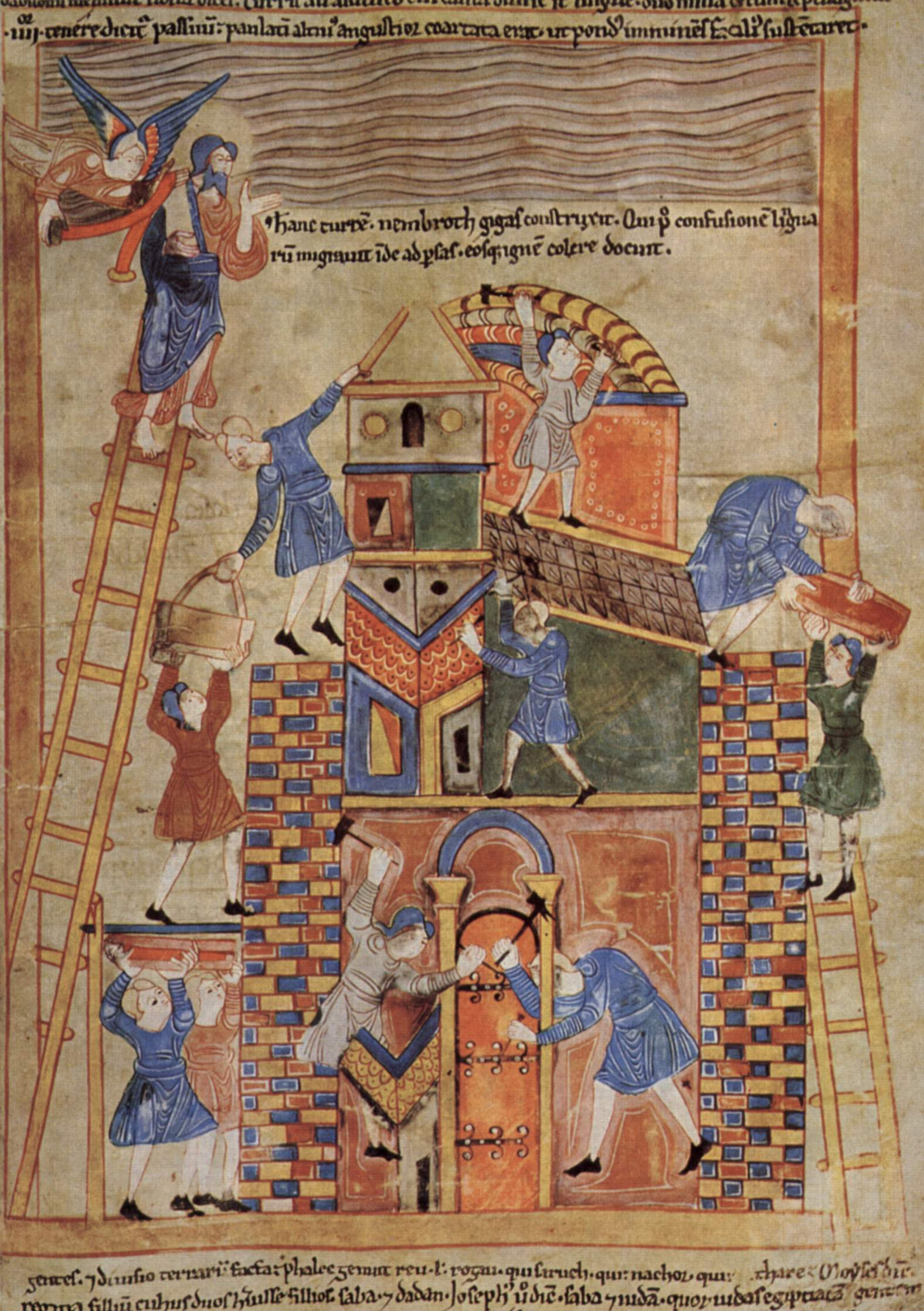
Building the Tower of Babel

The Old English Hexateuch, or Aelfric Paraphrase, is the collaborative project of the late Anglo-Saxon period that translated the six books of the Hexateuch into Old English, presumably under the editorship of Abbot Ælfric of Eynsham (d. c. 1010). It is the first English vernacular translation of the first six books of the Old Testament, i.e. the five books of the Torah (Genesis, Exodus, Leviticus, Numbers and Deuteronomy) and Joshua. It was probably made for use by lay people.

The translation is known in seven manuscripts, most of which are fragmentary. The best-known of those is a richly illuminated manuscript in the British Library, Cotton MS Claudius B.iv (from which the illustrations on this page are taken). Another copy of the text, without lavish illustrations but including a translation of the Book of Judges (hence also called the Old English Heptateuch), is found in Oxford, Bodleian Library, Laud Misc. 509.

Though described as "vivid and dynamic", the drawing and style of the Claudius miniatures has been regarded as somewhat crude compared to other manuscripts of the period, variously described as "rough", "incompetent" and "not of outstanding artistic importance". The whole manuscript is available online at the British Library website.

== Cotton Claudius B.iv, British Library ==
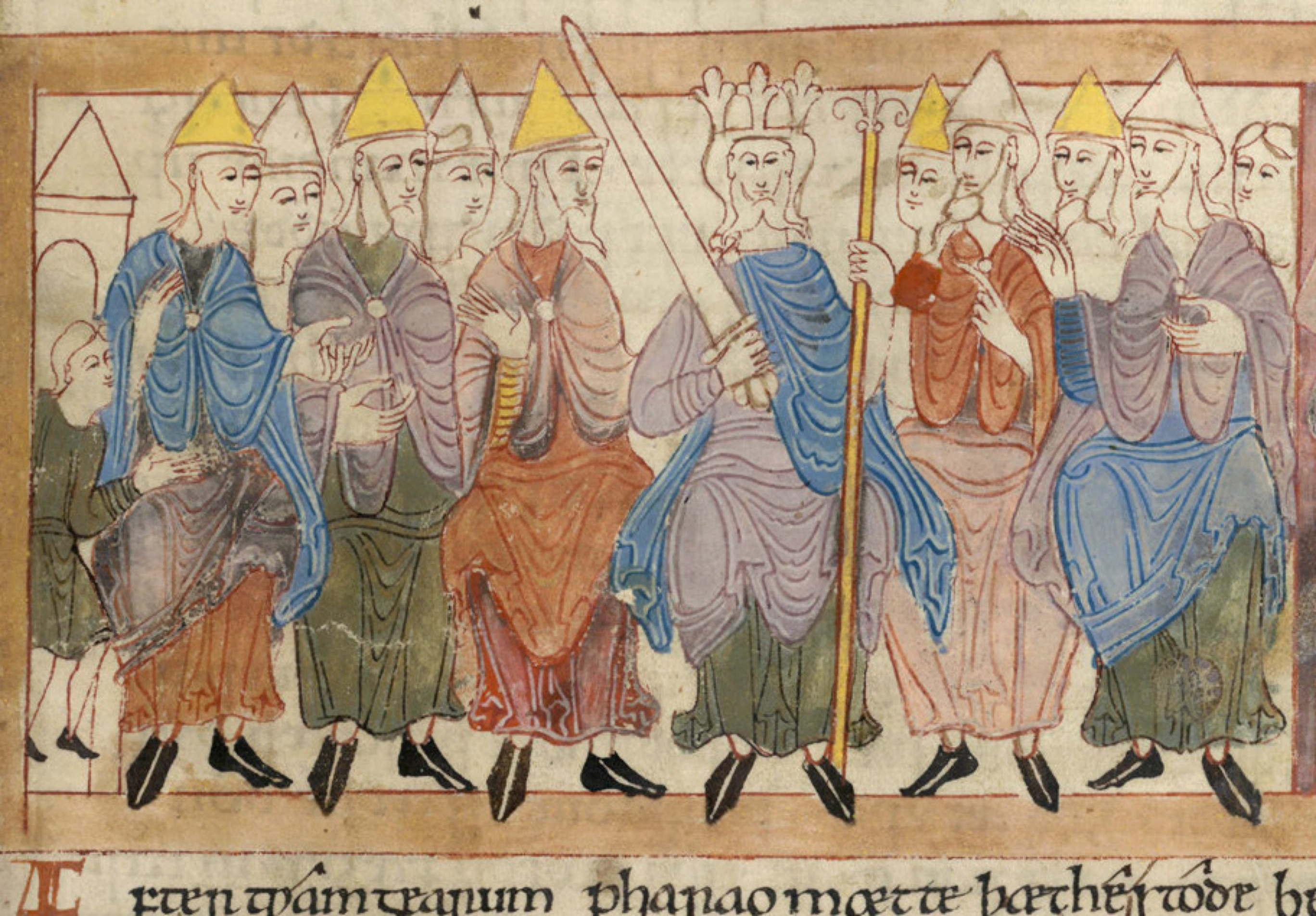
Anglo-Saxon king with his Witan representing a biblical scene in the Illustrated Old English Hexateuch

Claudius B.iv. was probably compiled in the second quarter of the 11th century at St Augustine's Abbey, Canterbury. It incorporates translations and a preface by Ælfric of Eynsham, while the remaining parts of the translation were carried out by anonymous authors. Peter Clemoes suggests that Byrhtferth of Ramsey was responsible for the compilation as well as for parts of the translation. With 156 folios, it is largely complete, but does not include all the biblical text of the books. Commentary and other material in Latin and Old English was added in the 12th century, often using blank areas in incomplete miniatures.

One or, more likely, several artists accompanied the narrative with 394 drawings in inks of various colours, most brightly coloured with washes, containing about 550 scenes. Many of these are unfinished, at varying stages of completion, and like most unfinished manuscript programmes, the degree of completion falls off in later sections. The settings do not attempt to represent Old Testament life as anything different from that of contemporary England, and so give valuable depictions of many aspects of the English world. The extensive illustrations suggest that it was designed mainly for lay use, and possibly intended for a single highly placed individual or family. It is the earliest illustrated manuscript of a large part of the bible in any vernacular language.

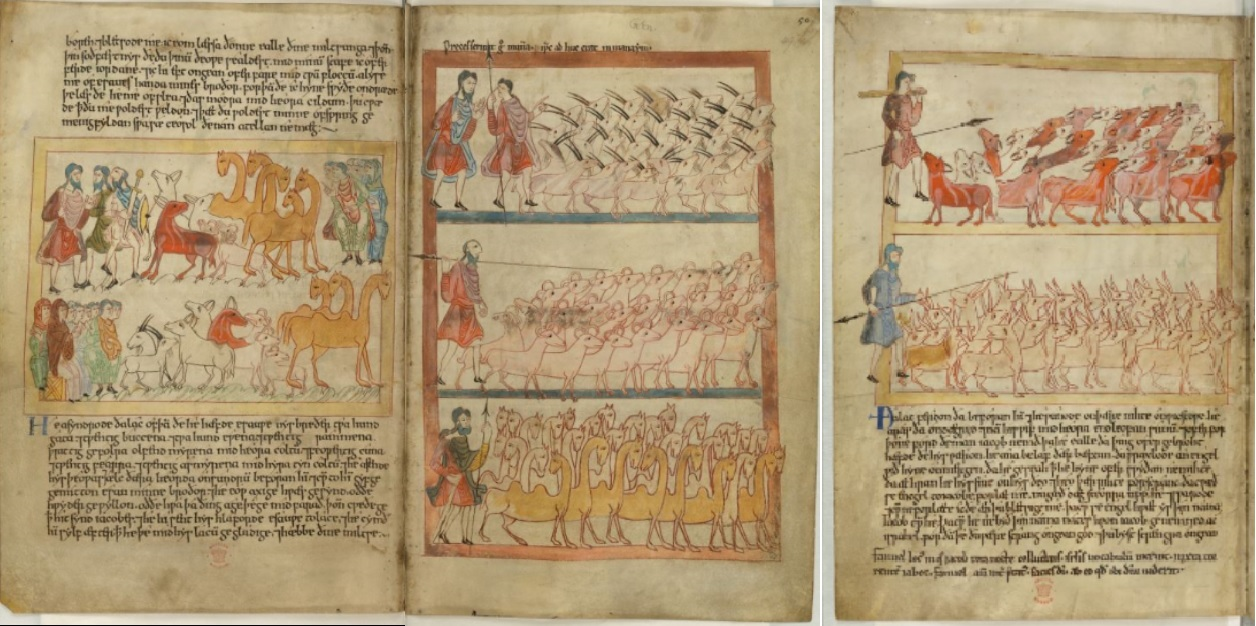
Jacob's gifts of livestock to Esau

There are twelve full-page miniatures spread through the texts, and the other miniatures range from nearly full-page to about a quarter of a page. Many pages have two or even three illustrations, and the majority of pages have a miniature, some of which combine two scenes in bordered compartments. The degree of completion with washes tends to diminish as the book goes on. Some images appear to have been added to at a later date. The colouring has some eccentricities; in particular many figures have blue hair, and the many tents are shown with boldly coloured stripes. Opportunities offered by the text to show groups of animals are usually taken, and the Hand of God frequently appears. The sheet size is 325 by 215 millimetres (12.8 in × 8.5 in) , with the text occupying 260 by 160 millimetres (10.2 in × 6.3 in). It was in the Cotton Library by 1621.

In particular the MS is believed to be the earliest surviving visual representation of the Horns of Moses, an iconographic convention which grew over the rest of the Middle Ages.

Together with the Junius manuscript (also in the British Library), and psalters, in particular the Harley Psalter copy of the Utrecht Psalter, it is the only surviving late Anglo-Saxon manuscript with extensive Old Testament illustrations. The Junius manuscript is from a few decades earlier, and also contains a retelling of Genesis, Exodus and other parts of the bible in Old English verse. The ambitious programme of illustration is also unfinished.

== Possible Late antique model ==
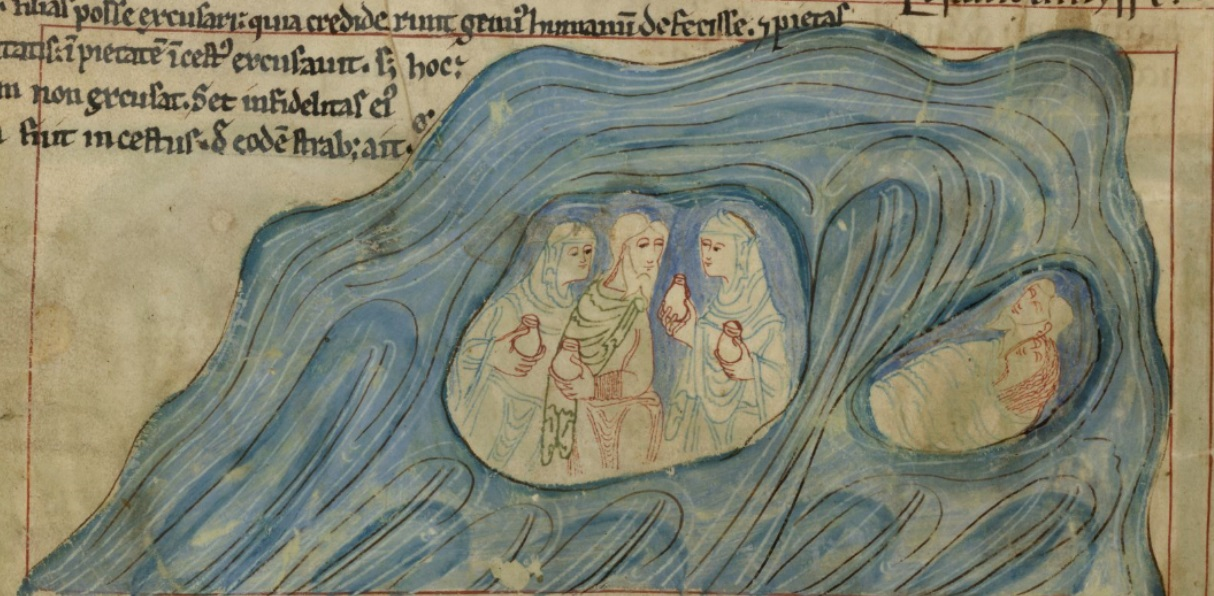
Lot and his daughters

Although the 1975 edition edited by Dodwell and Clemoes asserted that "the artist was not copying the pictures of a remote and long-forgotten age; like other creative artists he was thinking in terms of his own life and times”, this is exactly what is proposed in a monograph of 2017 by Herbert Broderick, dealing with the illustrations in the manuscript. He suggests that an ancient prototype was available in Canterbury at the time, with illustrations drawing on ideas about charismatic leadership current in Hellenistic Egypt.

This is especially the case for details in the iconography of the life of Moses, who is shown receiving his first bath, possibly the only such depiction in Western art, though there are Byzantine examples. This was a common trope in art depicting classical gods and heroes including Dionysus and Alexander the Great (not to mention Buddha), and, especially in Byzantine art, became a usual feature in the Nativity of Jesus in art. The horns of Moses, first known in art in this manuscript, are another example, though they do not take the form that became common. They rise straight from the sides of the head, and are large. In one illustration they are coloured yellow, perhaps suggesting light.

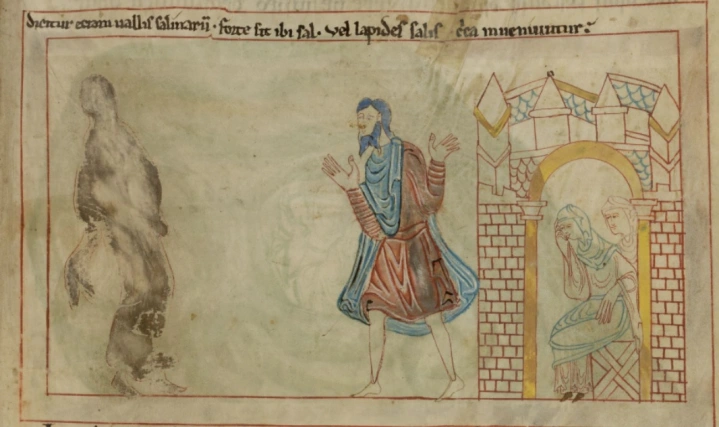
Lot and his wife

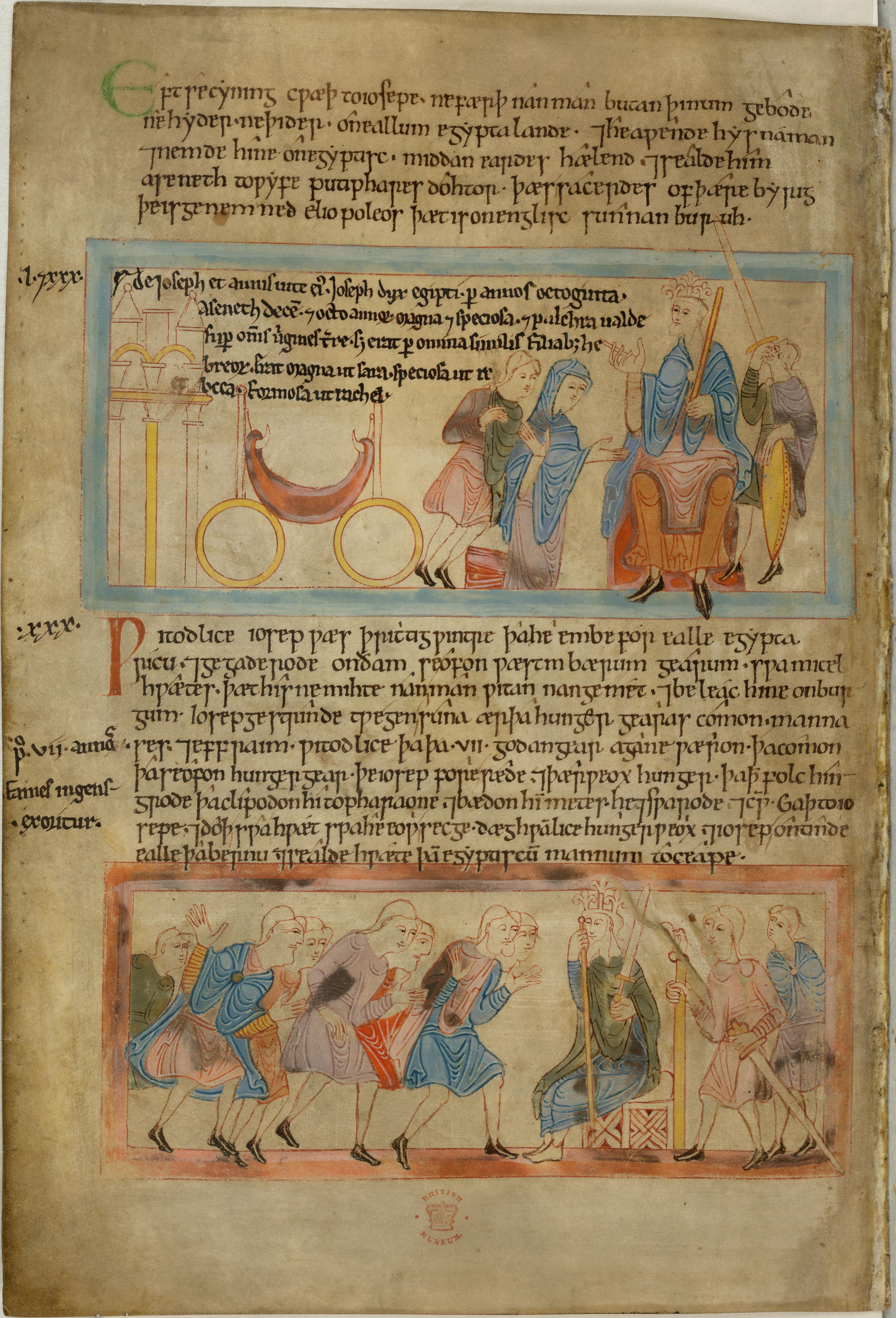
Folio 60 verso

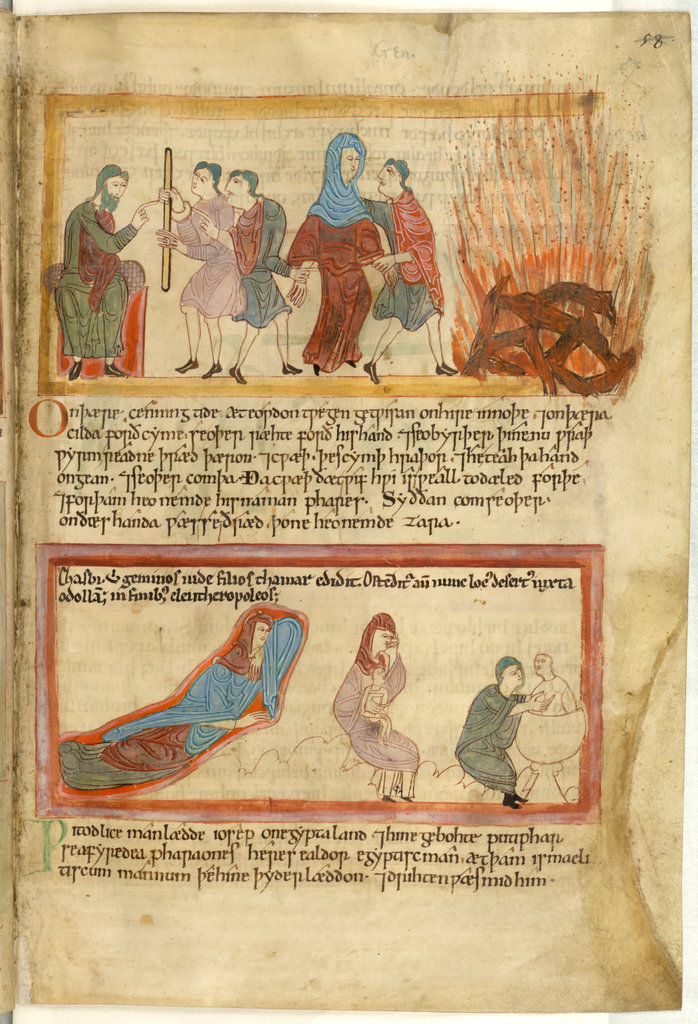
Two scenes of Tamar

== See also ==
- Old English Bible translations
  - Hatton Gospels
  - Wessex Gospels
