= Hexateuch =

First six books of the Hebrew Bible

The Hexateuch ("six scrolls") is the first six books of the Hebrew Bible: the Torah (Pentateuch) and the book of Joshua.

== Overview ==
The term Hexateuch came into scholarly use from the 1870s onwards mainly as the result of work carried out by Abraham Kuenen and Julius Wellhausen. Following the work of Eichhorn, de Wette, Graf, Kuenen, Nöldeke, Colenso and others, in his Prolegomena zur Geschichte Israels Wellhausen proposed that Joshua represented part of the northern Yahwist source (c 950 BC), detached from JE document by the Deuteronomist (c 650–621) and incorporated into the Deuteronomic history, with the books of Judges, Kings, and Samuel.

Reasons for this unity, in addition to the presumed presence of the other documentary traditions, are taken from comparisons of the thematic concerns that underlie the narrative surface of the texts. For instance, the Book of Joshua stresses the continuity of leadership from Moses to Joshua. Furthermore, the theme of Joshua, the fulfillment of God's promise to lead the Israelites to the Promised Land, complements the thematic material of the Pentateuch, which had ended with the Israelites on the border of the Promised Land ready to enter.

The thesis that Joshua completes the Torah in a "Hexateuch" may be contrasted with the view of scholars following the older rabbinic tradition, expressed by the compilers of the Jewish Encyclopedia (compiled between 1901 and 1906), that the Pentateuch is a complete work in itself. The thesis may also be contrasted with the view put forward by Eduard Meyer (1855–1930) that there never was any Hexateuch per se, but that the Law (that is, the Torah), Joshua, Judges, Samuel, and Kings all together once formed one great historic work.

== See also ==
- Pentateuch
- Heptateuch: the Hexateuch, plus the Book of Judges
- Octateuch: including the Book of Ruth
- Documentary hypothesis
- Martin Noth
- Old English Hexateuch
- Sixth and Seventh Books of Moses
