= Stan Nicholls =

British author and journalist

- Born: 1949 (age 75–76); London, England
- Occupation: Journalist

Stan Nicholls (born 1949) is a British author and journalist, working full-time since 1981. He is the author of many novels and short stories but is best known for the Orcs: First Blood series.

== Career ==
His journalism has appeared in The Guardian, The Independent, The Daily Mirror, Time Out, Sight and Sound, Rolling Stone, SFX and Locus among many others. Nicholls has worked for a number of specialists and general book shops including Dark They Were, and Golden Eyed and was the first manager of the London branch of Forbidden Planet.

Following on from Weapons of Magical Destruction, Part Two in the Bad Blood series, Army of Shadows was released in October 2009. The final book in the trilogy, Bad Blood: Inferno, was released in December 2011. A graphic novel set in the Orcs universe was set for release in 2010 or 2011.

== Awards ==
The first two books in the Orcs: First Blood series, Bodyguard of Lightning and Legion of Thunder, received best novel nominations at the 1999 British Fantasy Awards. In 2007, Nicholls was awarded the Le'Fantastique Lifetime Achievement Award for Contributions to Literature at the Trolls & Legendes Festival in Mons, Belgium. His 2008 novel Orcs Bad Blood 1: Weapons of Magical Destruction was nominated for the inaugural David Gemmell Legend Award for best fantasy novel.

== Personal life ==
Nicholls currently lives in the West Midlands with his wife, science fiction author Anne Gay.

== Bibliography ==
Orcs

- First Blood: Bodyguard of Lightning (1999)
- First Blood: Legion of Thunder (1999)
- First Blood: Warriors of Tempest (2000)
- Orcs: First Blood (2004, omnibus edition of the First Blood trilogy)
- Bad Blood: Weapons of Magical Destruction (2008, Titled "Orcs: Bad Blood" in America)
- Bad Blood: Army of Shadows (2009)
- Bad Blood: Inferno (2011)
- Orcs Bad Blood: The Second Omnibus (2013, omnibus edition of the Bad Blood trilogy)
- Orcs: Forged for War (2013, original graphic novel, illustrated by Joe Flood)

Dreamtime Trilogy

- Quicksilver Rising / Covenant Rising
- Quicksilver Zenith / Righteous Blade
- Quicksilver Twilight / Diamond Isle

Nightshade Trilogy

- Book of Shadows
- Shadow of a Sorcerer
- Gathering of Shadows
