= Corpus Glossary =

Anglo-Saxon glossary

The Corpus Glossary is one of many Anglo-Saxon glossaries. Alongside many entries which gloss Latin words with simpler Latin words or explanations, it also includes numerous Old English glosses on Latin words, making it one of the oldest extant texts in the English language.

== History ==
The manuscript of the Corpus Glossary, Cambridge Corpus Christi College, 144, dates to the 8th century. The manuscript in fact contains two glossaries, the first of which is short, and the second of which (fols. 4–64v, to which the name 'Corpus Glossary' usually refers) is much longer. This latter contains almost the full text of the Épinal-Erfurt glossary (deriving independently from the same archetype as the Épinal and Erfurt manuscripts), along with about as much extra material again. It also shares much material with the Leiden Glossary.

== Bibliography ==
- Online facsimile at the Parker Library, Corpus Christi College.
- Bischoff, Bernhard, Mildred Budny, Geoffrey Harlow, M. B. Parkes and J. D. Pheifer (eds), The Épinal, Erfurt, Werden, and Corpus Glossaries: Épinal Bibliothèque Municipale 72 (2), Erfurt Wissenschaftliche Bibliothek Amplonianus 2o 42, Düsseldorf Universitätsbibliothek Fragm. K 19: Z 9/1, Munich Bayerische Staatsbibliothek Cgm. 187 III (e.4), Cambridge Corpus Christi College 144, Early English Manuscripts in Facsimile, 22 (Copenhagen, 1988).
- Lindsay, W. M. (ed.), The Corpus Glossary (Cambridge: Cambridge University Press, 1921).
- Lindsay, W. M., The Corpus, Épinal, Erfurt and Leyden Glossaries, Publications of the Philological Society, 8 (London: Oxford University Press, 1921), repr. in Wallace Martin Lindsay, Studies in Early Mediaeval Latin Glossaries, ed. by Michael Lapidge (Aldershot, 1996), ch. 11 (with index to lemmata, omitted from original publication, at end of volume).
