= Antwerp-London Glossaries =

11th century Old English-Latin glossaries

The Antwerp-London Glossaries are a set of eleventh-century glossaries found in the margins of what was once a single manuscript of the Excerptiones Prisciani. They provide important evidence for Old English vocabulary, and in David W. Porter's estimation, the glossaries offer "a vivid picture of Anglo-Saxon school texts and the environment that produced them".

== Manuscript(s) ==
Now split in two, the manuscript is held as Antwerp, Plantin-Moretus Museum, 16.2 and London, British Library, Add. 32246. The cities in which this dismembered manuscript is held give their name to the glossaries. The glossaries are thought to have been produced at Abingdon Abbey by a group of scholars who also produced the exceptionally densely glossed copy of Aldhelm's Prosa de virginitate in the manuscript Brussels, Bibliothèque Royale 1650 (which might also once have been part of the same manuscript).

== Editions and facsimiles ==
A key early study of the glossary was undertaken by Max Förster.

- Lowell Kindschi, 'The Latin-Old English Glossaries in Plantin-Moretus MS. 32 and British Museum MS. Additional 32246' (unpublished PhD dissertation, Stanford University, 1955).
- Rolf H. Bremmer Jr. and Kees Dekker, Anglo-Saxon Manuscripts in Microfiche Facsimile, Volume 13: Manuscripts in the Low Countries, Medieval and Renaissance Texts and Studies, 321 (Tempe, Arizona: Arizona Center for Medieval and Renaissance Studies, 2006); ISBN 978-0-86698-366-2 (facsimile)
- The Antwerp–London Glossaries: The Latin and Latin–Old English Vocabularies from Antwerp, Museum Plantin-Moretus 16.2 – London, British Library Add. 32246, Volume 1: Texts and Indexes, ed. by David W. Porter, Publications of the Dictionary of Old English, 8 (Toronto: Pontifical Institute of Mediaeval Studies, 2011); ISBN 978-0-88844-908-5.
- Digital facsimile of Add. 32246 at the British Library
