= St Andrew's Church, Cullompton =

Parish church in Cullompton, Devon, England

Coordinates: 50°51′21″N 3°23′28″W

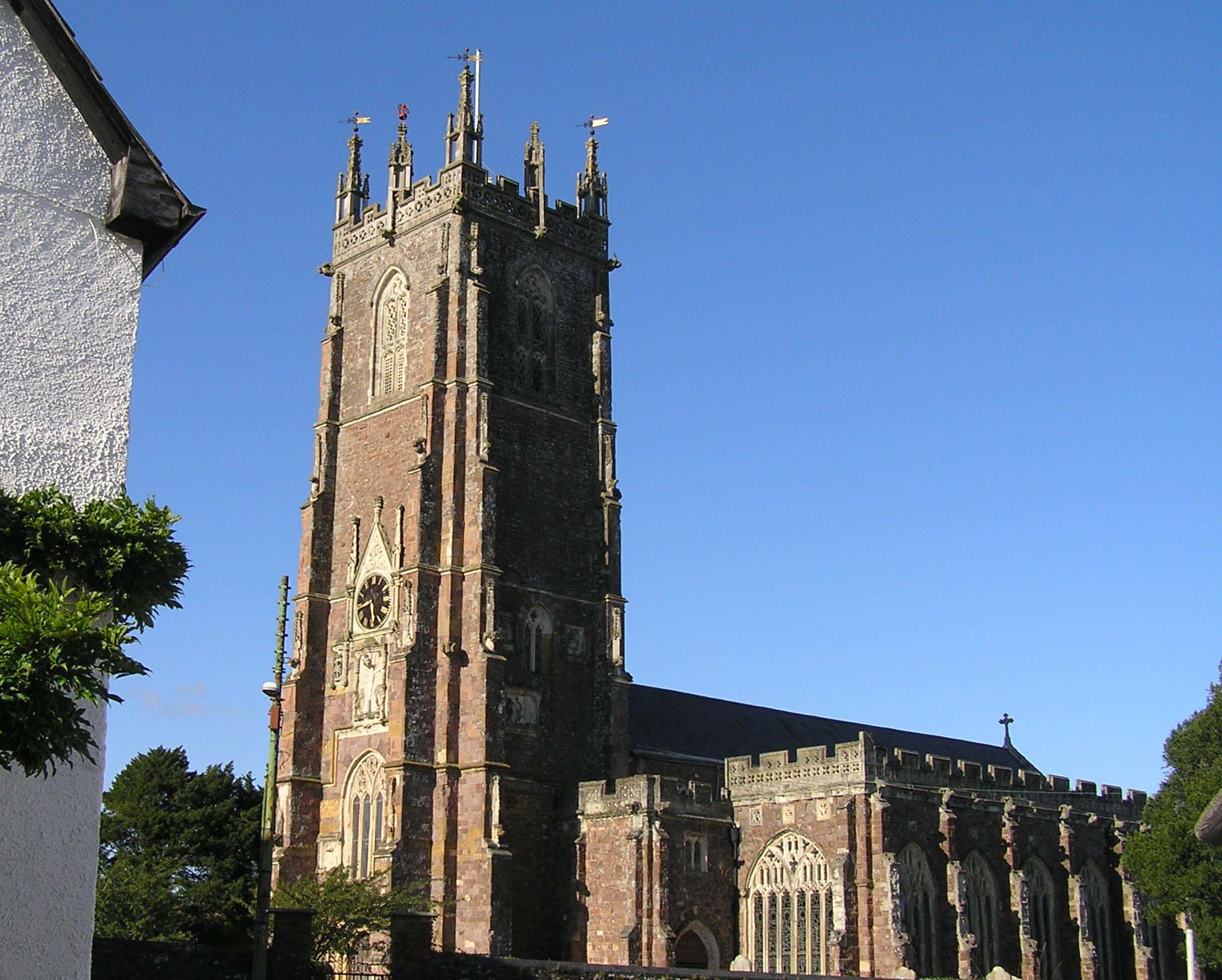
- The church from the south-west
- St Andrew's Church, Cullompton
- OS grid reference: ST 02189 07170
- Location: Cullompton
- Country: United Kingdom
- Denomination: Anglican
- Previous denomination: Roman Catholic
- Website: https://standrewscullompton.com/

History
- Dedication: St Andrew
- Earlier dedication: Columba of Terryglass (disputed)

Architecture
- Functional status: Active
- Heritage designation: Grade I listed
- Style: Perpendicular Gothic
- Groundbreaking: Early 15th century
- Completed: After 1552

Specifications
- Height: 120 feet (tower)
- Materials: Beer stone

Administration
- Archdiocese: Canterbury
- Diocese: Exeter
- Deanery: Cullompton

St Andrew's Church is an Anglican parish church in the town of Cullompton, Devon, England. It was founded in Saxon times, but the present building is largely 15th century. It is noted for its fan vaulted Lane Aisle, painted screen and roofs, and rare medieval carving of Golgotha.

== History ==
The Saxons first settled in the area in the seventh century and founded a minster, or religious community. In 872, Alfred the Great bequeathed 'Columtune' to his son Æthelweard in his will. The name suggests that the early church may have been dedicated to Columba of Terryglass, who preached to the west Saxons, though it has long been dedicated to St Andrew. After the Norman Conquest the church was granted to Battle Abbey in Sussex, and then passed to St Nicholas' Priory, Exeter. The earliest part of the present building is the nave, which dates to the first half of the 15th century. The grandeur of the church reflects the rivalry between the landed More (or Moore) family of Moor Hayes and the nouveau riche cloth merchant John Lane, who funded rival chapels on opposite sides of the building. Construction continued even after the Reformation, when St Nicholas' Priory was dissolved and patronage passed to the More family. The chancel was rebuilt and the woodwork repainted in 1849–51 by Sir Edward Ashworth, as part of the Victorian restoration of the church.

== Architecture ==
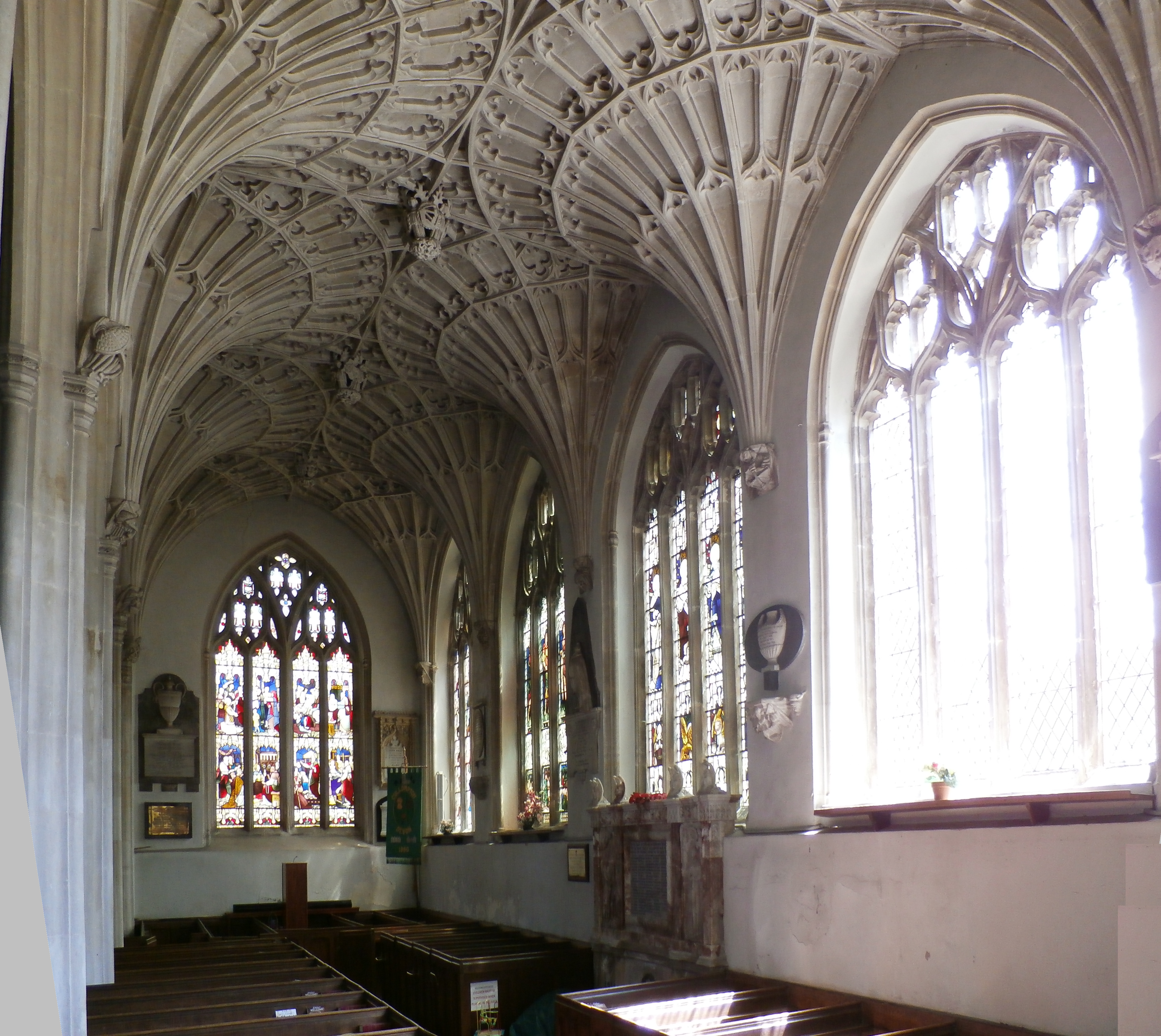
The Lane Aisle

Like many churches in Devon and Cornwall, the building was entirely rebuilt in the 15th century. The plan was originally a simple aisled rectangle, with no chancel arch, and the building also has a clerestory, which is unusual for the region. The timber wagon roofs are original, though much-repainted, particularly that for the chancel. The Lane Aisle (or Chapel) to the south was begun in 1526 to contain John Lane's tomb and was still under construction in 1552, even though chantries had been abolished in 1547. It is roofed with a fine fan vault, a very rare extravagance for a parish church, which was inspired by the Dorset Aisle at Ottery St Mary and may have been an afterthought added during construction. The vault is supported by buttresses attached to the columns inside the church, as well as outside. The exterior of the chapel is decorated with inscriptions commemorating John Lane, and carvings of his merchant's mark and ships. The final part of the medieval church to be raised was the west tower, which was begun in 1539, at the height of the Reformation, and was still under construction in 1545. It now bears a 19th-century clock, in addition to defaced original carvings of the Calvary with St George and St Edmund (the two medieval patron saints of England), which show some early Renaissance character.

=== Furnishings ===
As well as the medieval woodwork described below, the church contains a set of early 19th century box pews and an Ionic west gallery of 1637. There is a squire's pew in the former More Chapel to the north of the chancel. This chapel has an angular late medieval parclose screen, the Mores' effort being decidedly overshadowed by John Lane's extravagant chapel opposite. Victorian stained glass windows include works by Morris & Co. and probably Clayton and Bell. Medieval wall paintings were uncovered in the 19th century, but are now concealed under the plaster.

==== Rood screen ====
The church interior looking east, showing the rood screen.

The well-preserved timber rood screen extends across the nave and aisles and has a vaulted coving, both features common in the West Country. The roof loft that would have stood above the screen, blocking the view into the chancel, has disappeared. Under the roof, the beam that carried the rood itself survives, with notches into which the statues would be fixed, taking up much of the space between the beam and the ceiling.

==== Golgotha ====
Detail of the Golgotha

In the later Middle Ages, every church in England was dominated by a carving of the Crucifixion, flanked by St Mary and St John. These were almost entirely destroyed at the Reformation, making the fragment at Cullompton a unique survival. It consists of a large piece of timber carved with rocks, skulls and bones to represent the hill of Golgotha (also known as Calvary), and formed the base of the otherwise-destroyed Crucifixion scene.
