= Richard More (priest) =

16th-century English cleric

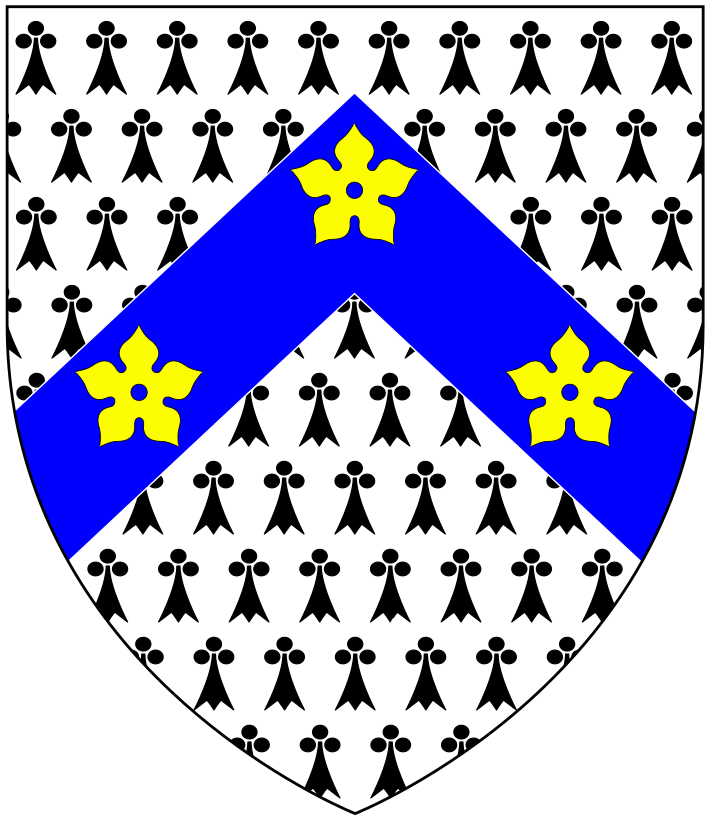
Arms of Moore of Moorehays: Ermine, on a chevron azure three cinquefoils or

Richard Moore or More DCnL (after 1459 – 20 February 1516) was an English cleric who served as Archdeacon of Exeter from 1505 to 1515 and then as Treasurer of Exeter Cathedral.

== Life ==
A younger son of John Moore (d. 1509/10) who lived at Moorhayes in the parish of Cullompton in Devon, and his wife Elizabeth Clivedon (d. 1515), daughter and co-heiress of John Clivedon who lived at Willand in Devon, his elder brother Maurice (or Morris) Moore (1459-1500) inherited the family estate while he entered the church. At an untraced university he earned a doctorate in canon law. He was appointed Archdeacon of Exeter on 13 January 1505, and as Treasurer of Exeter Cathedral on 24 May 1515. He died on 20 February 1516 and a monument to him was erected in the cathedral.
