= Moor Hayes =

Historic estate in Devon, England

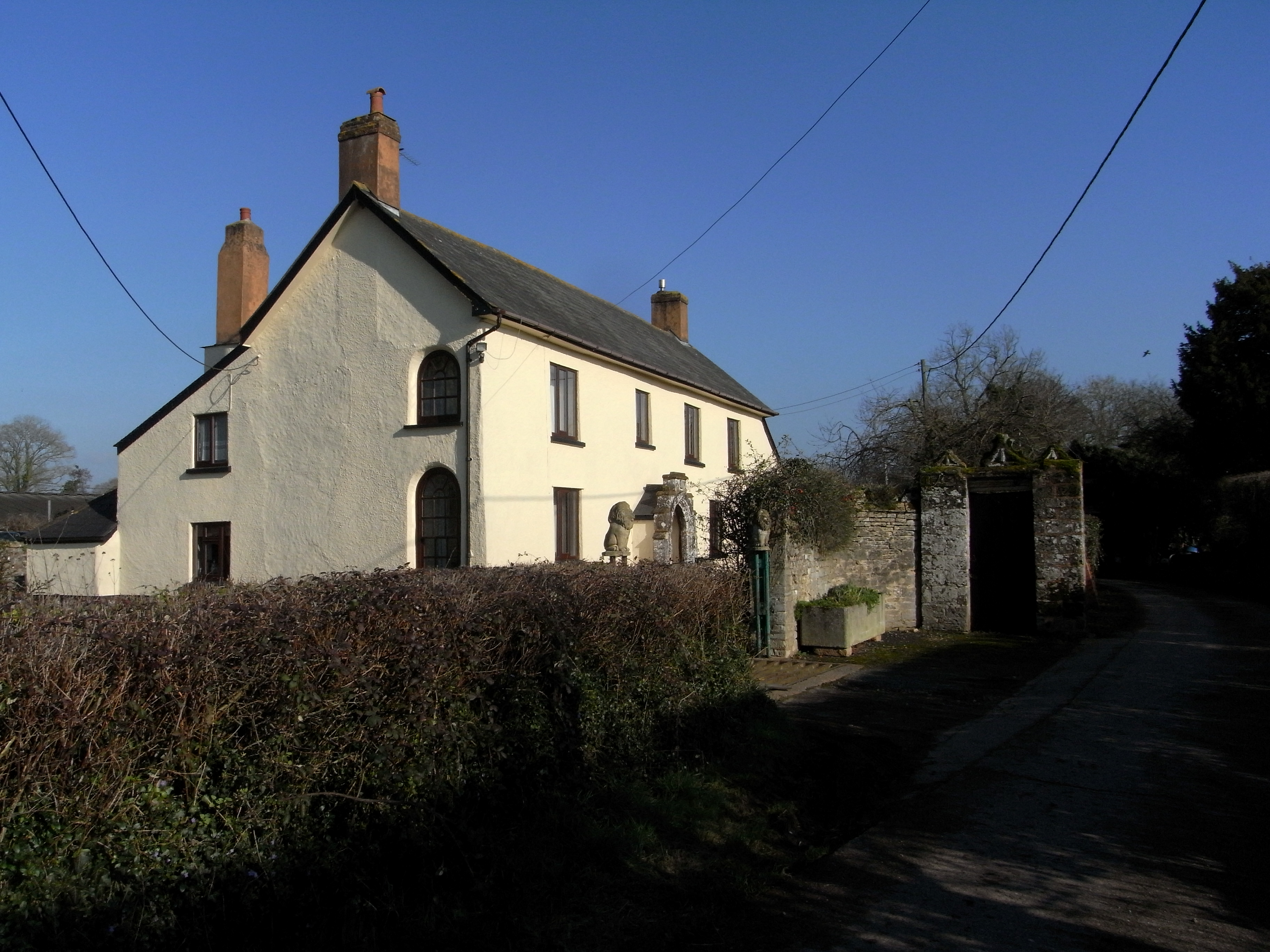
"Moorhayes Farm", remnant of the ancient mansion house of the Moore family, viewed in 2017

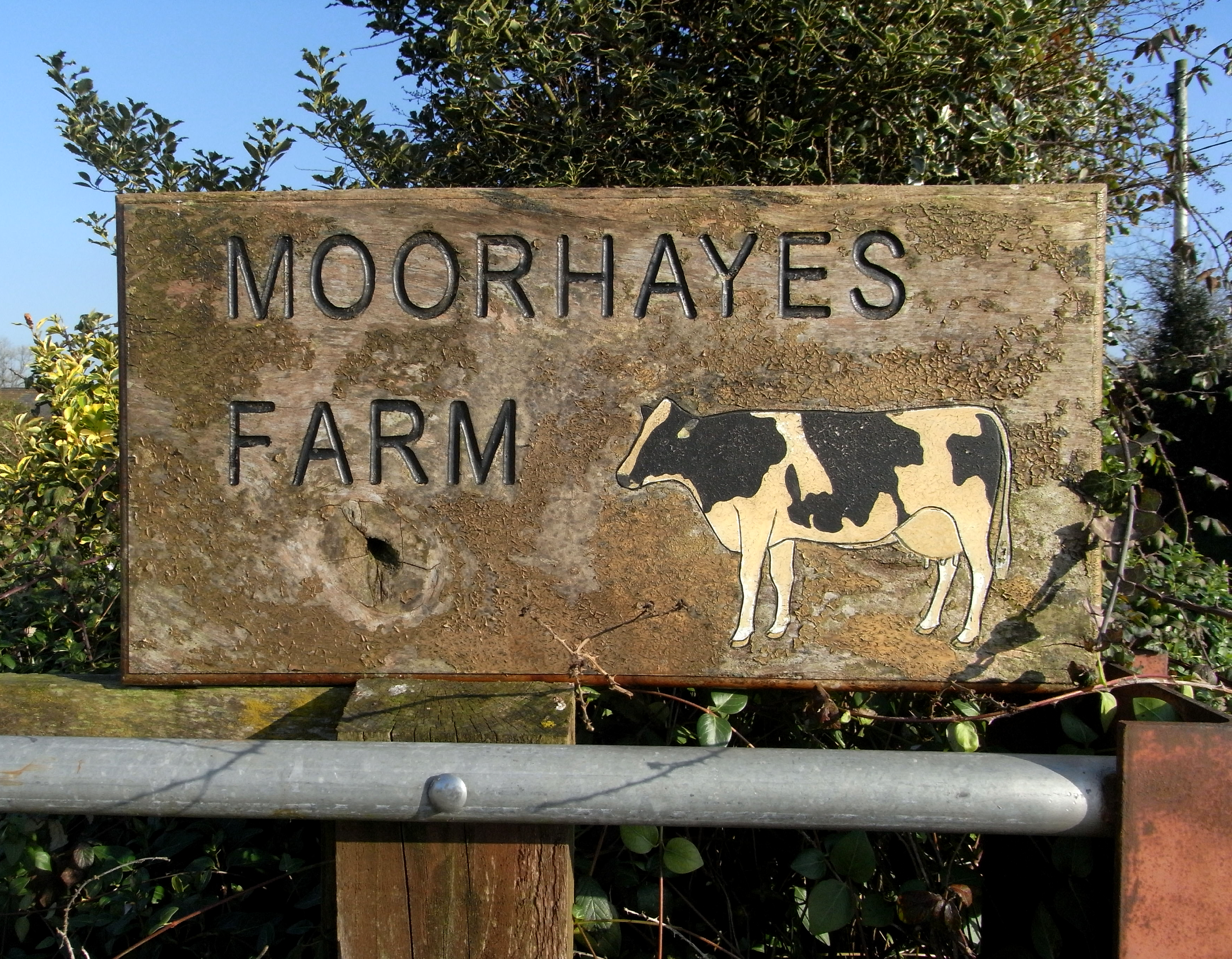
"Moorhayes Farm", house-sign, viewed in 2017

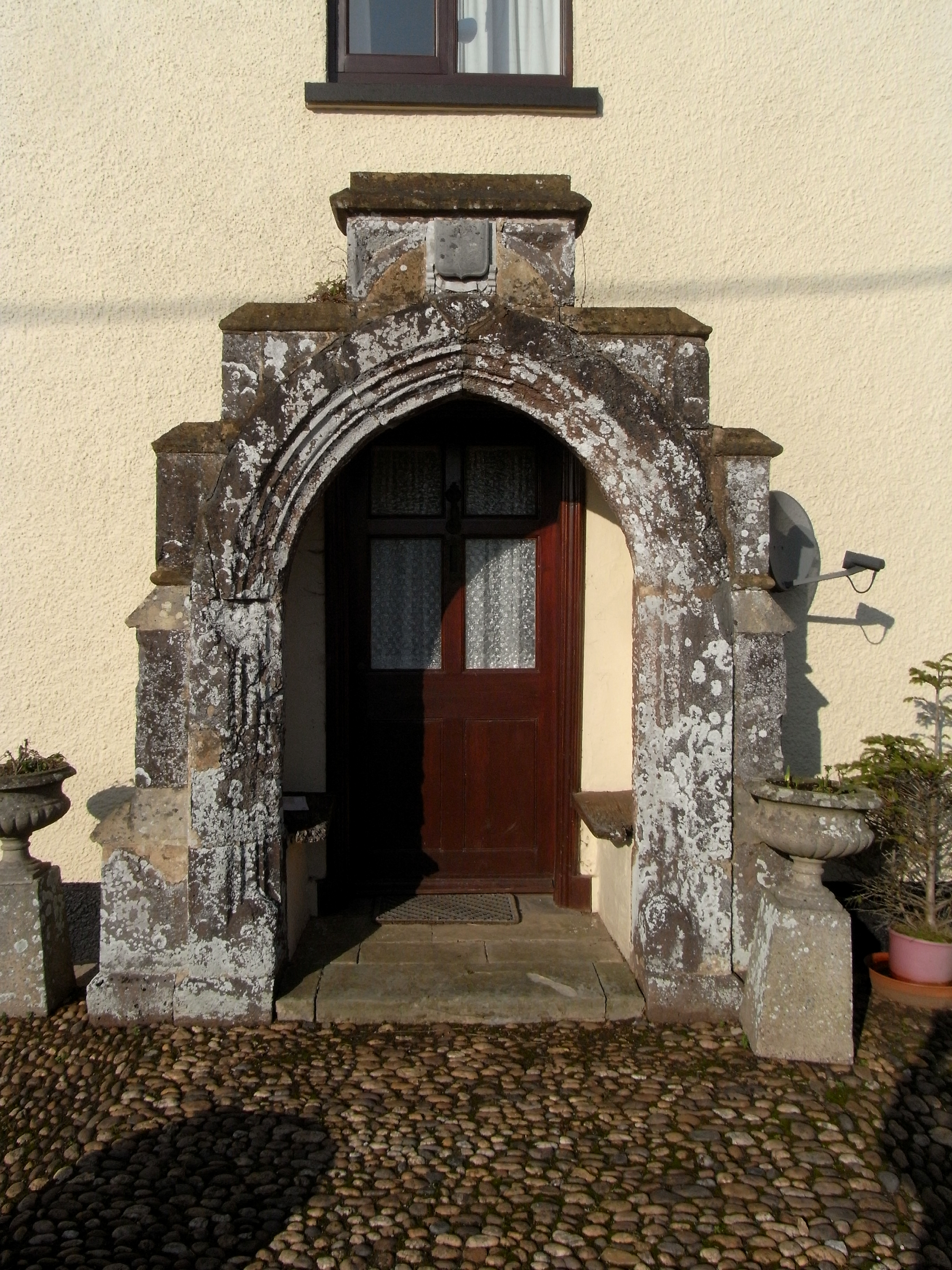
Entrance porch of Moorhayes Farm, viewed in 2017. Reset medieval arch probably taken from the chapel formerly attached to the house

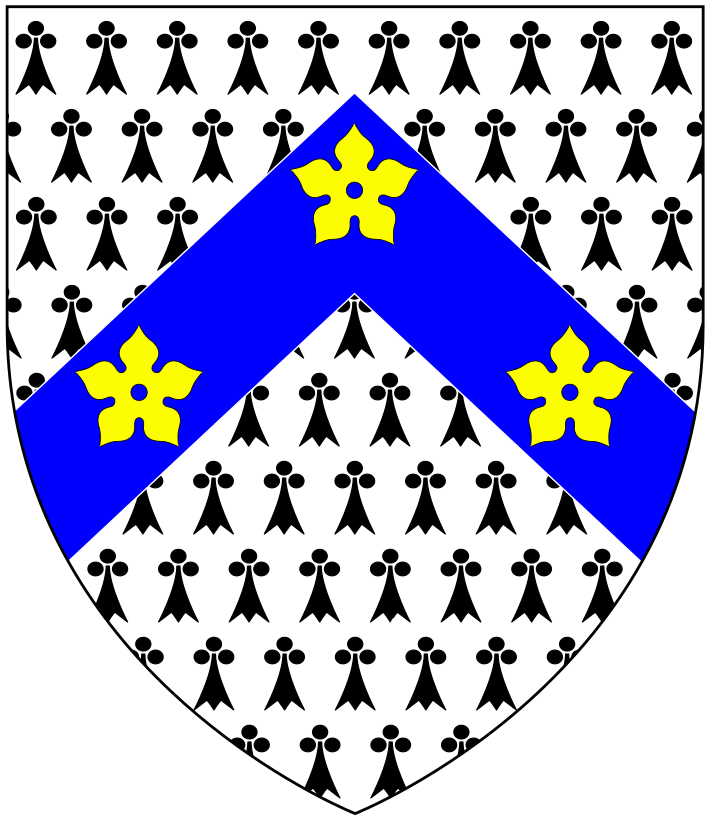
Arms of Moore of Moore Hays: Ermine, on a chevron azure three cinquefoils or

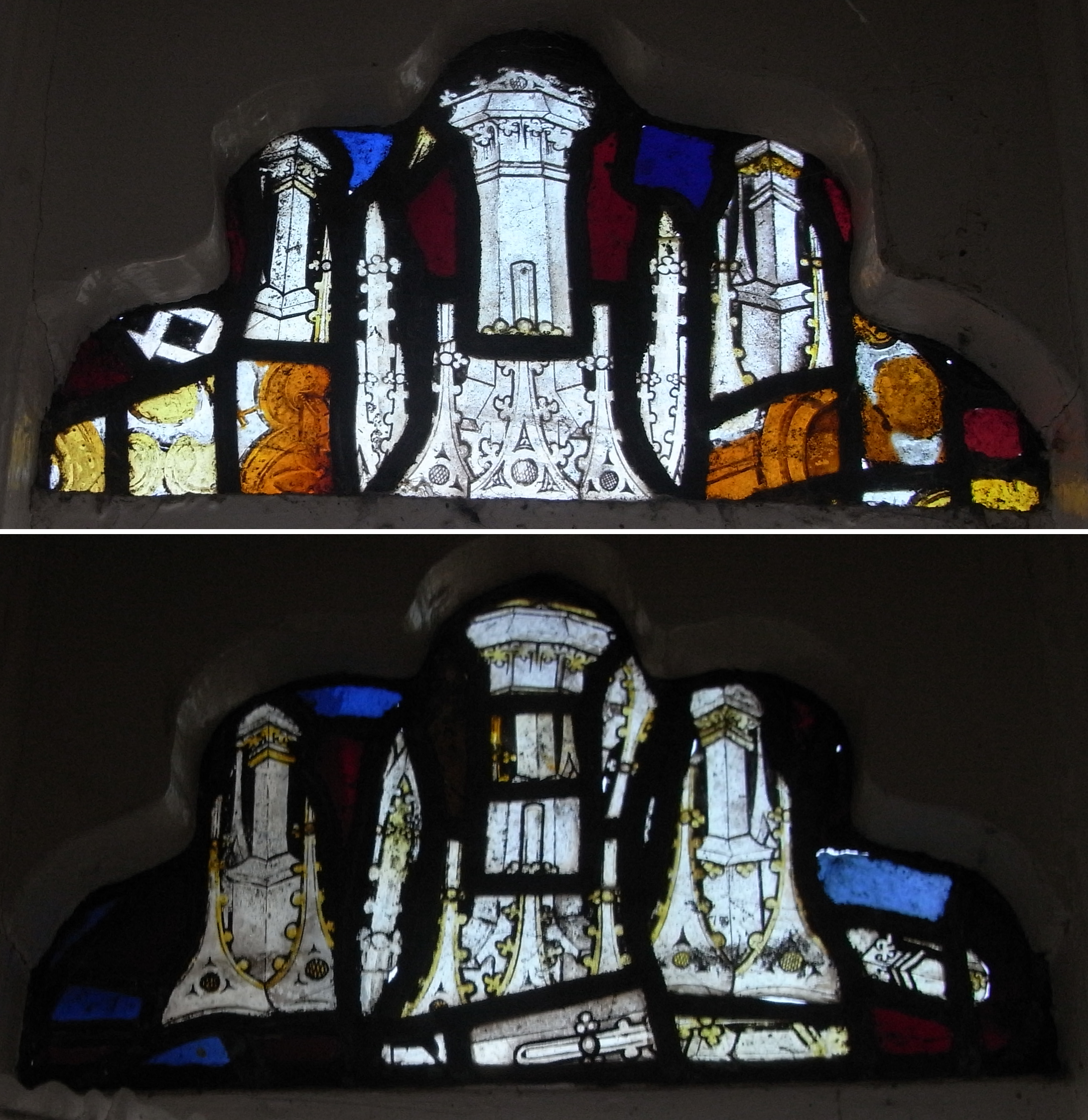
Stained glass fragments showing canopy-work, circa 1500, probably from former chapel at Moor Hayes, today reset in a window on the staircase landing of Moorhayes Farm

Moor Hays (alias Moore Hays, Moorhays, Moorhayes, etc.) is a historic estate in the parish of Cullompton in Devon, England. It is stated incorrectly to be in the nearby parish of Burlescombe in Tristram Risdon's Survey of Devon. The estate is not to be confused with Moor Hayes in the parish of Washfield, about 3 miles north-west of Tiverton, another ancient farmstead, which since 2005 has been the site of a large housing estate named "Moorhayes".

== Descent of the manor ==
For many centuries the manor was the seat of the prominent Moore (alias Moor) family. John Moore was Recorder of Exeter in 1434, and thus the arms of Moore of Moor Hayes are amongst the many shields displayed in the Exeter Guildhall. This appears to be the John Moore shown in the Heraldic Visitations as the husband of Elizabeth Botour, daughter and heiress of Henry Botour of Exeter. According to the Devon historian Tristram Risdon (d.1640), King Henry VIII (1509-1547) sold the manor of Aller to "Mr Moore of Cullumpton", thus either to Humphrie Moore (d.1537) or to his son Sir John Moore of Moor Hayes, who was knighted at the Palace of Westminster by King Edward VI in 1549. Sir John Moore married Katherine Pomeroy, a daughter of Sir Thomas Pomeroy (1503-1566), feudal baron of Berry Pomeroy in Devon.

The Devon historian Sir William Pole (d.1635) was lord of the manor of Aller and was thus well acquainted with the Moore family of Moor Hayes, whose pedigree he sets out in some detail in his work.

=== Junior members of the family ===
Richard More (d.1516) was a younger son of John Moore of Moor Hayes (d.1509/10) by his wife Elizabeth Clivedon, a daughter and co-heiress of John Clivedon of Willand. Richard Moore was Archdeacon of Exeter and became Treasurer of Exeter Cathedral, where his monument survives.

Rev. John Moore (c.1595–1657), a clergyman of Puritan views and an author of pamphlets against enclosures, was a younger son of Sir John Moore of Moor Hayes, (kt 1549), by his wife Katherine Pomeroy.

John Moore (1646–1714), Bishop of Norwich and Bishop of Ely was a member of a junior branch of the family and the grandson of Rev. John Moore.

== Moorehayes Chapel, Cullompton Church ==
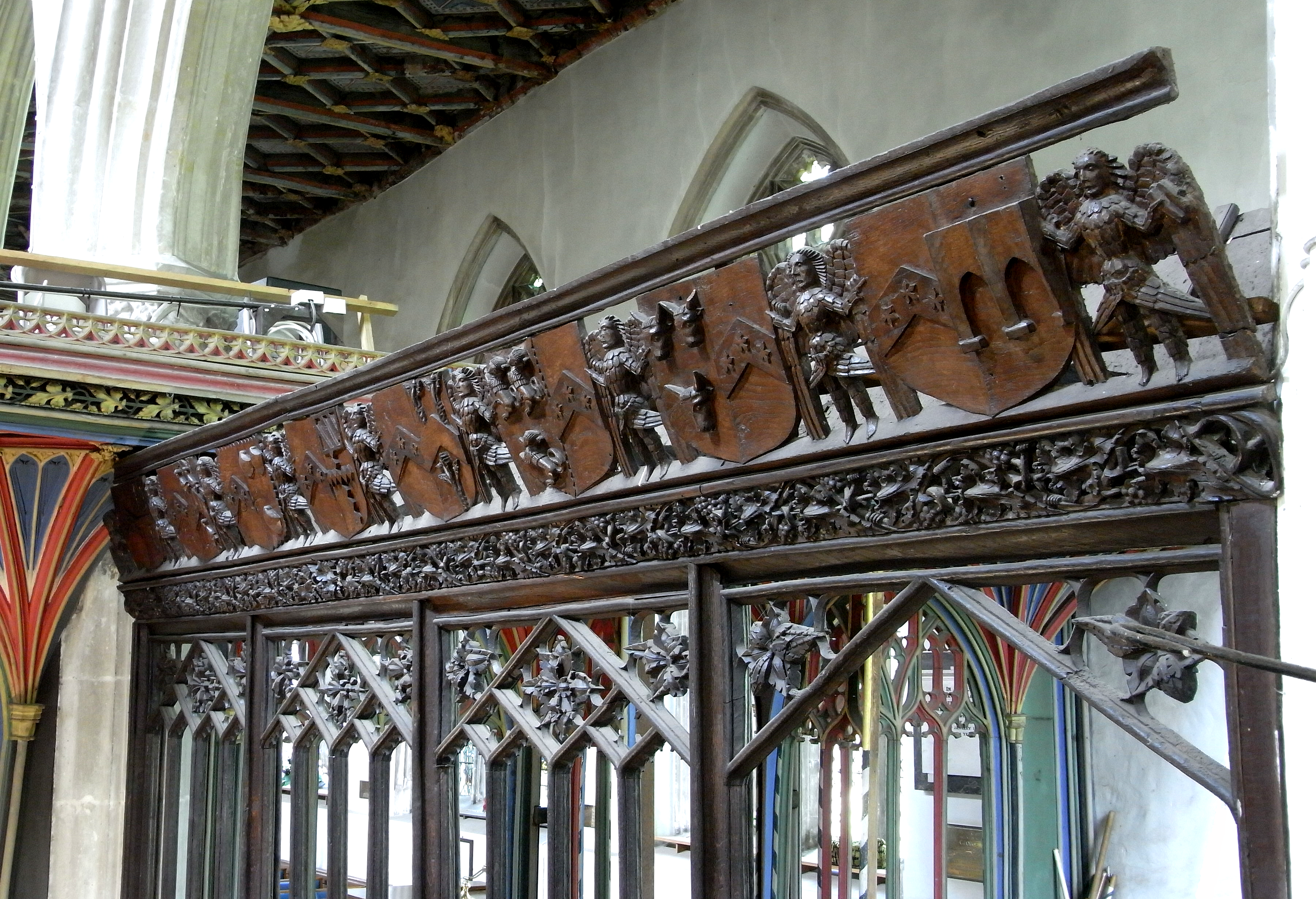
Parclose screen of the Moorhayes Chapel, east end of north aisle of Cullompton Church. South side, viewed from the chancel

The armorials of Moore of Moore Hayes survive on sixteen relief-sculpted wooden heraldic shields circa 1530, each supported by two four-winged angels, atop an intricately carved wooden parclose screen in the "Moorehayes Chapel" (alias "Moore's Chantry", "Moore's Aisle") occupying the east end of the north aisle of St Andrew's Church, Cullompton. The screen separates the Moorehayes Chapel from the chancel. The sixteen shields are eight shields duplicated in identical order on the internal and external sides of the screen. The lord of the manor is generally permitted to build a manorial pew or manorial chapel within the parish church. They show the following arms, left to right:

- 1: Moore impaling Gambon (of Moorstone in the parish of Halberton?(Pole, pp. 197,484)(Argent, a fess between three men's legs couped sable), to represent the marriage of John de la Moor (fl. 14th/15th c.) to the daughter and heiress of the Gambon family;(Vivian, p. 572) (canting arms, French jambe = leg). This is the most ancient Moore ancestor depicted, occupying the fourth generation before Richard Moore (d.1516), Archdeacon of Exeter.
- 2: Moore impaling Botour (Sable, on a chevron argent five gouttes de sang between three storks of the second) (Pole, p. 471, blazon standardised), to represent the marriage of John Moore of Moor Hayes (nephew of John de la Moor, husband of the Gambon heiress) to Elizabeth Botour, daughter and heiress of Henry Botour of Exeter. John Moore's sister Alis Moore was married (as his first wife) to Sir John Juyn (d.1440), Lord Chief Justice of the King's Bench.
- 3: Moore impaling Cliveden (Argent, a chevron between three escallops gules), for the marriage of John Moore (d.1509/10) (son of William Moore and Jane Stawell, and thus grandson of John Moor and Elizabeth Botour) of Moor Hayes to Elizabeth Cliveden (d.1515), a daughter and co-heiress of John Cliveden of Willand, Devon. Pole stated of John Moore (d.1509/10): "Hee was a wise man, learned in the lawes, & a governour in this country, & lived to bee an old man". Following the Dissolution of the Monasteries the Moore family purchased the manor of Willand, formerly held by Taunton Priory.
- 4: Moore impaling Stowell/Stawell (Gules a cross lozengy argent) with a chief apparently of Martin (Gules, three bends or), for the marriage of William Moore of Moorhayes (son and heir of John Moore and Elizabeth Botour) to Jane Stawell, daughter and heiress of the Stawell family of Cothelstone, Somerset. (Vivian, p. 572)
- 5: Moore impaling A chevron between three oaken slips fructed (a wife of unknown family).
- 6: Kirkham (Argent, three lions rampant gules a bordure engrailed sable) impaling Moore, to represent the first marriage of Sir John Kirkham (1472-1529) of Blagdon in the parish of Paignton, Devon, Sheriff of Devon in 1523/4, to an unnamed daughter of the family of Moore of Moore Hayes. The marriage was without issue and he married a further three times. The father of Sir John Kirkham was Nicholas Kirkham (1434-1516) who built the famous screen of the Kirkham chantry in St John's Church, Paignton, where survives his effigy, with those of his wife and parents.
- 7: Walrond (Argent, three bull's heads cabossed sable) impaling Moore, for the marriage of John Walrond of nearby Bradfield, Uffculme, Devon, to Margaret Moore, a daughter of John Moore and Elizabeth Cliveden, and sister of Richard Moore (d.1516), Archdeacon of Exeter and Treasurer of Exeter Cathedral.
- 8: Moore impaling Trowbridge (Or, over water proper a bridge triple-towered gules), representing the marriage of William Moore (d.1581) (4th son of John Moore and Elizabeth Cliveden and thus a brother of Richard Moore (d.1516), Archdeacon of Exeter and Treasurer of Exeter Cathedral) to Dorothy Trobridge, a daughter of the Trobridge family of Trobridge near Crediton, Devon.

On the floor of the Moore Chapel are numerous floor slabs, described in Cresswell, Beatrix F., Notes on Devon Churches in the Deanery of Cullompton, 1920. The far grander chapel in Cullompton Church was the South Aisle Chapel, built by the wealthy clothier John Lane (d.1529). There was a dispute concerning this between his widow and the Moore family which resulted in a law suit heard by the Star Chamber, the record of which is held at the National Archives at Kew, summarised as follows:

"Plaintiff: Thomasyne late wife of John Lane, of Cullompton; Defendant: Humphrey More, John More, Christopher More, and John Smyth. Place or subject: Forcible entry into a chapel built by plaintiff's late husband adjoining to the parish church".

== Lands and house ==
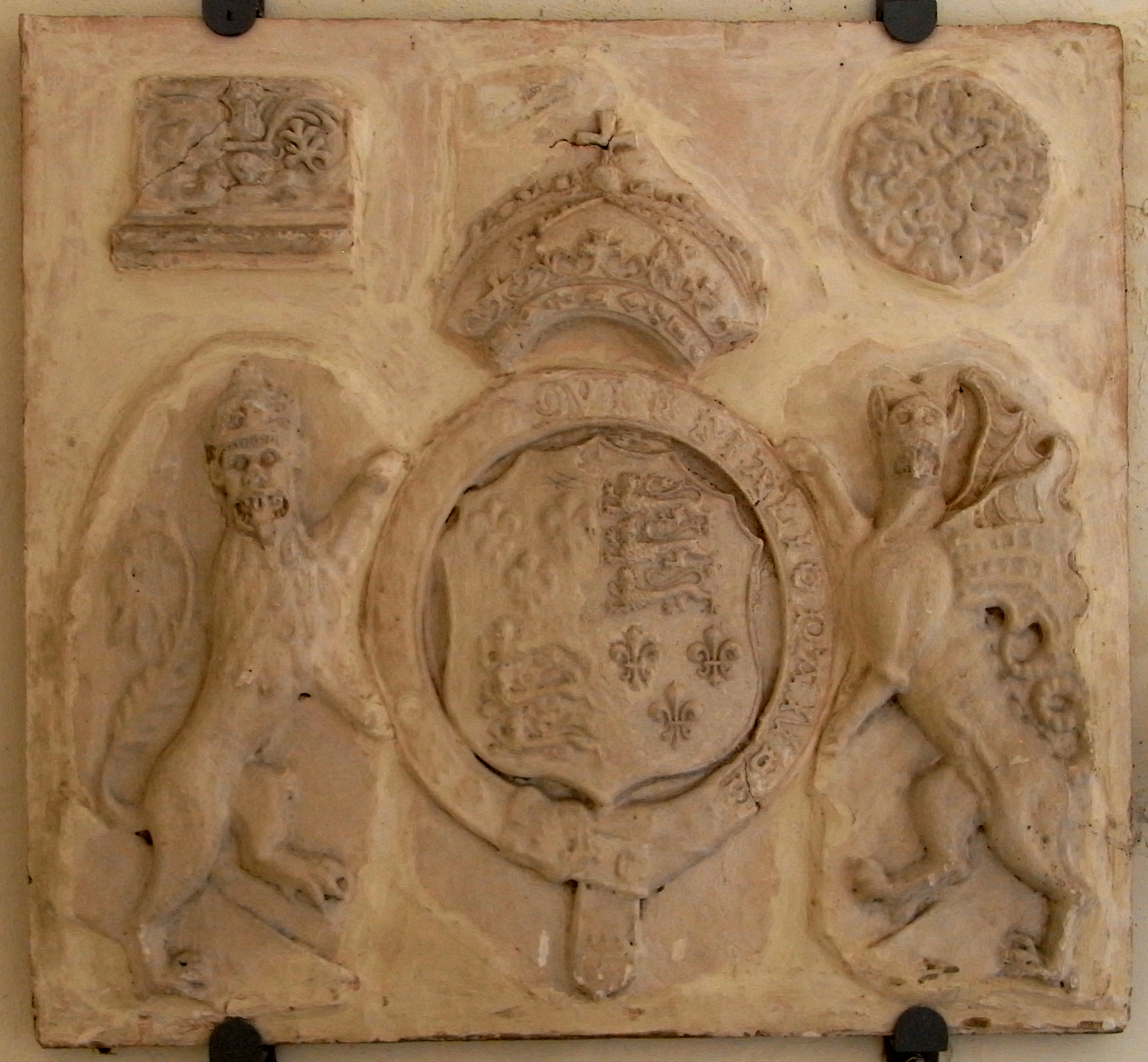
Large relief-sculpted stone tablet displaying the royal arms of one of the Tudor monarchs (1485-1603) with other heraldic elements, formerly at Moor Hayes, now displayed in Tiverton Museum (item TIVMS: 1977.727)

The estate covered much of the unusually flat low ground of the basin of the River Culm, between various hilly regions of Devon. The former mansion house is today represented by Higher Moorhayes Farm, situated about 4 miles north-east of the town of Cullompton, from which it is separated by the River Culm, and 6 miles south-east of the town of Tiverton, and by Lower Moorhayes, situated about 2 miles north-east of the town of Cullompton.

Higher Moorhayes Farm is a grade II listed building, possibly incorporating a 15th century core structure, extensively remodelled in the 19th century. It incorporates fragments of a medieval chapel, which identifies it as the residence of a family of high social status. The earliest surviving dateable feature is of the late 16th century. It is essentially a three-room "cross-passage" house, with the original great hall on the higher side to the right of the screens passage, originally with a fireplace at the higher end. The entrance porch retains a (worn-away) sculpted heraldic shield in the apex, with a reset medieval arch probably taken from the chapel. In the lower end room survives a fireplace with a decorative plaster overmantel displaying festoons and a central lion's head which could be late 16th century, now heavily painted. In the stairwell window survive fragments of late 15th or early 16th century painted glass canopy work, probably from the chapel. The gateway to the garden incorporates re-used medieval material including piers and finials with a lintel with composite roll and concave moulding.

A large sculpted stone tablet displaying the royal arms of one of the Tudor monarchs (1485-1603) with other heraldic elements, formerly at Moor Hayes, is now displayed in Tiverton Museum (item TIVMS: 1977.727).

The M5 Motorway was built (1967–77) near the western boundary of the ancient estate.

== Sources ==
- Pole, William (1791). John-William de la Pole (ed.). Collections Towards a Description of the County of Devon. London.
- Risdon, Tristram (1811). Rees; et al. (eds.). The Chorographical Description or Survey of the County of Devon (updated ed.). Plymouth: Rees and Curtis.
- Vivian, Lt.Col. J.L., (Ed.) The Visitations of the County of Devon: Comprising the Heralds' Visitations of 1531, 1564 & 1620, Exeter, 1895, p. 572, pedigree of "Moore of Moorhays"
- Vivian, J.L. (1895). The Visitations of the County of Devon, 1531, 1564 and 1620. With additions. Part 2. pp. 437–899.
