= Fan vault =

Form of vaulting

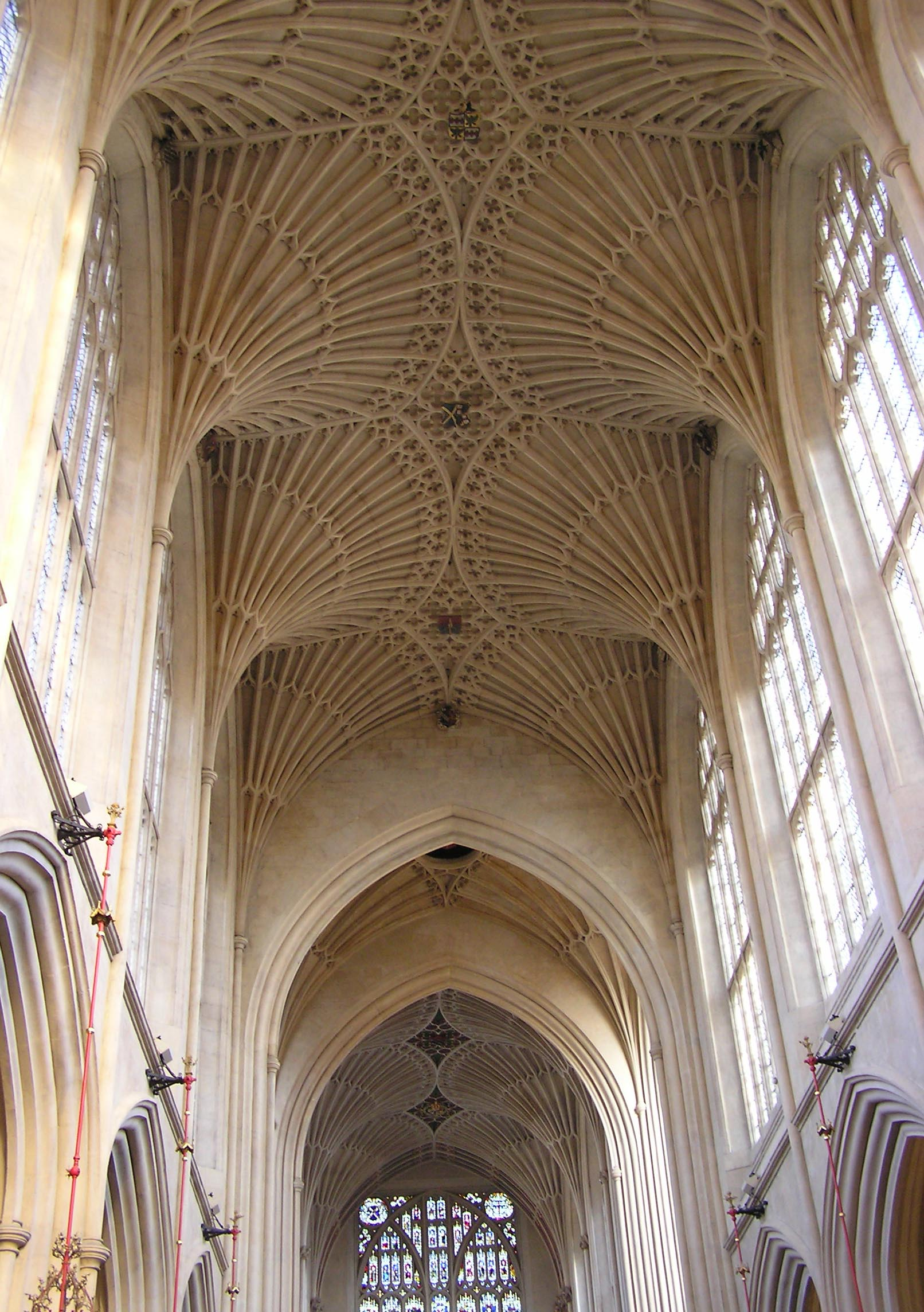
Fan vaulting over the nave at Bath Abbey, England: made from local Bath stone, this is a Victorian restoration (in the 1860s) of the original roof of 1608

A fan vault is a form of vault used in the Gothic style, in which the ribs are all of the same curve and spaced equidistantly, creating a conoid structure in a manner resembling a fan. The initiation and propagation of this design element is strongly associated with England and the Perpendicular Gothic style.

The earliest example, dating from about 1351, may be seen in the cloisters of Gloucester Cathedral. The largest fan vault in the world can be found in King's College Chapel, Cambridge.

The fan vault is peculiar to England. The lierne vault of Barbastro Cathedral in northern Spain closely resembles a fan vault, but it does not form a perfect conoid. John Harvey (1978) suggests Catherine of Aragon as a possible source of English influence in Aragon.

== Birth of the fan vault ==
The fan vault is attributed to development in Gloucester between 1351 and 1377, with the earliest known surviving example being the east cloister walk of Gloucester Cathedral, though an early decorative use of in the same period can be seen at the Holy Trinity Chapel of nearby Tewkesbury Abbey, dated by Historic England to 1375. Harvey (1978) hypothesises that the east cloister at Gloucester was finished under Thomas de Cantebrugge from the hamlet of Cambridge, Gloucestershire, who left in 1364 to work on the chapter house at Hereford Cathedral (also thought to have been fan vaulted on the basis of a drawing by William Stukeley, and the only fan-vaulted chapter house of its kind; no other chapter houses in England feature a fan vault, though their radial rib vaults are often mistaken for fan vaults). The other three parts of the cloister at Gloucester were begun in 1381, possibly under Robert Lesyngham.

Other examples of early fan vaults exist around Gloucester, implying the activity of several 14th century master masons in that region.

== Structure ==
The ribs of a fan vault are of equal curvature and rotated at equal distances around a central (vertical) axis, forming the unique conoid shape which gives rise to the name. In between sequences of conoids, flat central spandrels fill the space, unlike in true rib vaults and their derivatives (tierceron, lierne) where ribs extend to meet diagonally across the centre at a boss, giving a "squared-off" plan. Some vaults closely imitate the fan vault using a complex lierne vault that do not create true circular conoids, such as in the crossing vaults of Wells Cathedral and Milton Abbey.

According to Leedy (1980), the fan vault was developed in England (as opposed to France and other centres of Gothic architecture) due to the manner in which English rib vaults were normally constructed. In an English rib vault, the courses are laid perpendicular to the rib while in France they are laid perpendicular to the wall.

== Buildings with fan vaulting ==
=== Medieval and Early Modern ===
- Gloucester Cathedral, cloisters, earliest fan vaulting begun 1373 by Abbot Horton
- King's College Chapel, Cambridge, the world's largest fan vault (1512–1515)
- Bath Abbey, Somerset, nave and chancel (1860s restoration; originally by William Vertue)
- Brasenose College, Oxford, Chapel ceiling – a spectacular example of plaster pendant fan vaulting
- Canterbury Cathedral, crossing tower by John Wastell, Henry VI's chantry chapel
- Christ Church, Oxford, staircase to the great hall
- Church of St Andrew, Mells, Somerset, porch
- Church of St John the Baptist, Axbridge, Somerset, crossing
- Church of St Peter and St Paul, Muchelney, Somerset, under the tower
- Church of St. John the Baptist, Cirencester, Gloucestershire, porch and north chapel
- Collegiate Church of St Mary, Warwick, Dean's Chapel
- Convocation House, Oxford
- Corpus Christi College, Cambridge, main gateway
- Ely Cathedral, Bishop Alcock's chantry chapel
- Eton College Chapel (the vault dates from 1958)
- Hampton Court Palace, Great Gate and oriel window in the Great Hall
- Henry VII's Lady Chapel, Westminster Abbey, London, 1503–1509 (with pendants, by William Vertue)
- Manchester Cathedral, under the tower
- Peterborough Cathedral, Cambridgeshire, retrochoir
- Red Mount Chapel, King's Lynn
- Sherborne Abbey, Dorset, quire c. 1430, nave c. 1490 (by William Smyth)
- St Andrew's Church, Cullompton, Devon, Lane Chapel (outer south aisle)
- St Bartholomew's Church, Tong, Shropshire, chantry chapel
- St David's Cathedral, Wales, Trinity Chapel
- St Mary Aldermary, London (by Christopher Wren)
- St Mary's Church, North Leigh, Oxfordshire, Wilcote chantry chapel
- St Mary's Church, Ottery St Mary, Devon, aisle
- St Stephen's cloister at the Palace of Westminster (1529)
- St. George's Chapel, Windsor, crossing, Urswick chantry chapel
- Tewkesbury Abbey, cloister (only one bay remains)
- University College, Oxford, gatehouse vaults
- University Church of St Mary the Virgin, Oxford, porch
- Winchester Cathedral, Beaufort and Waynflete chantry chapels
- St. Mary's Church, Putney, Bishop West chapel
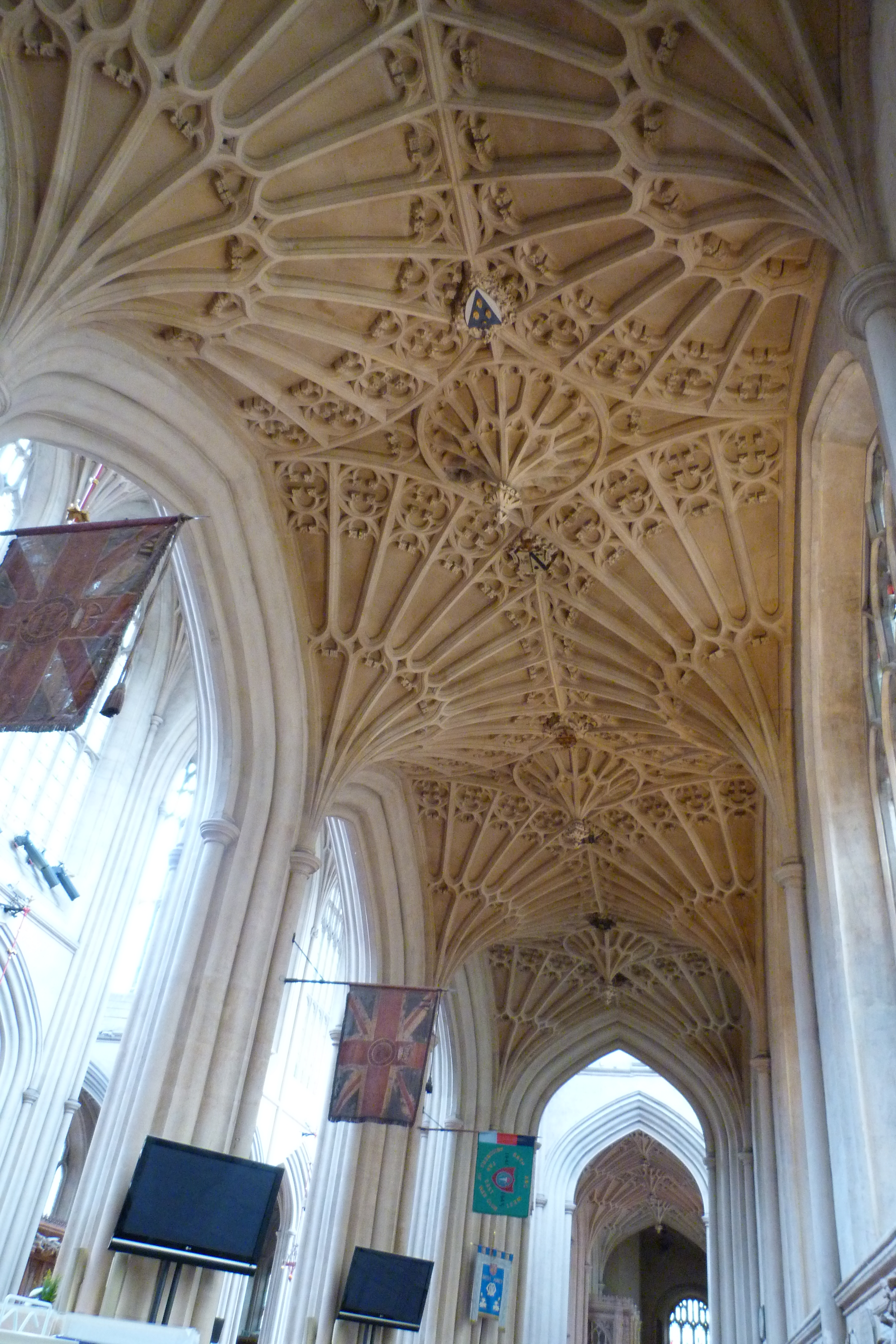
Bath Abbey

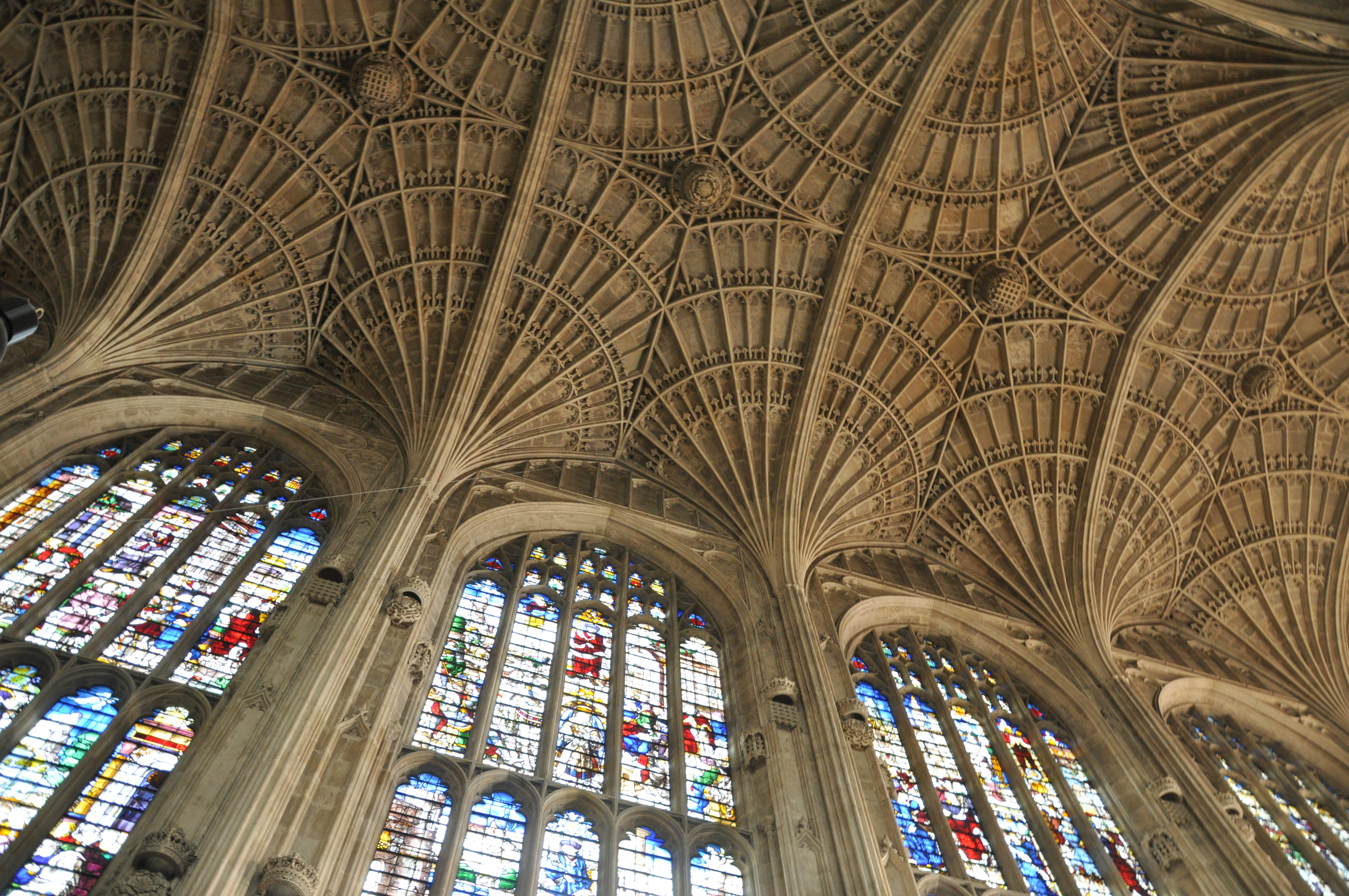
King's College Chapel, Cambridge

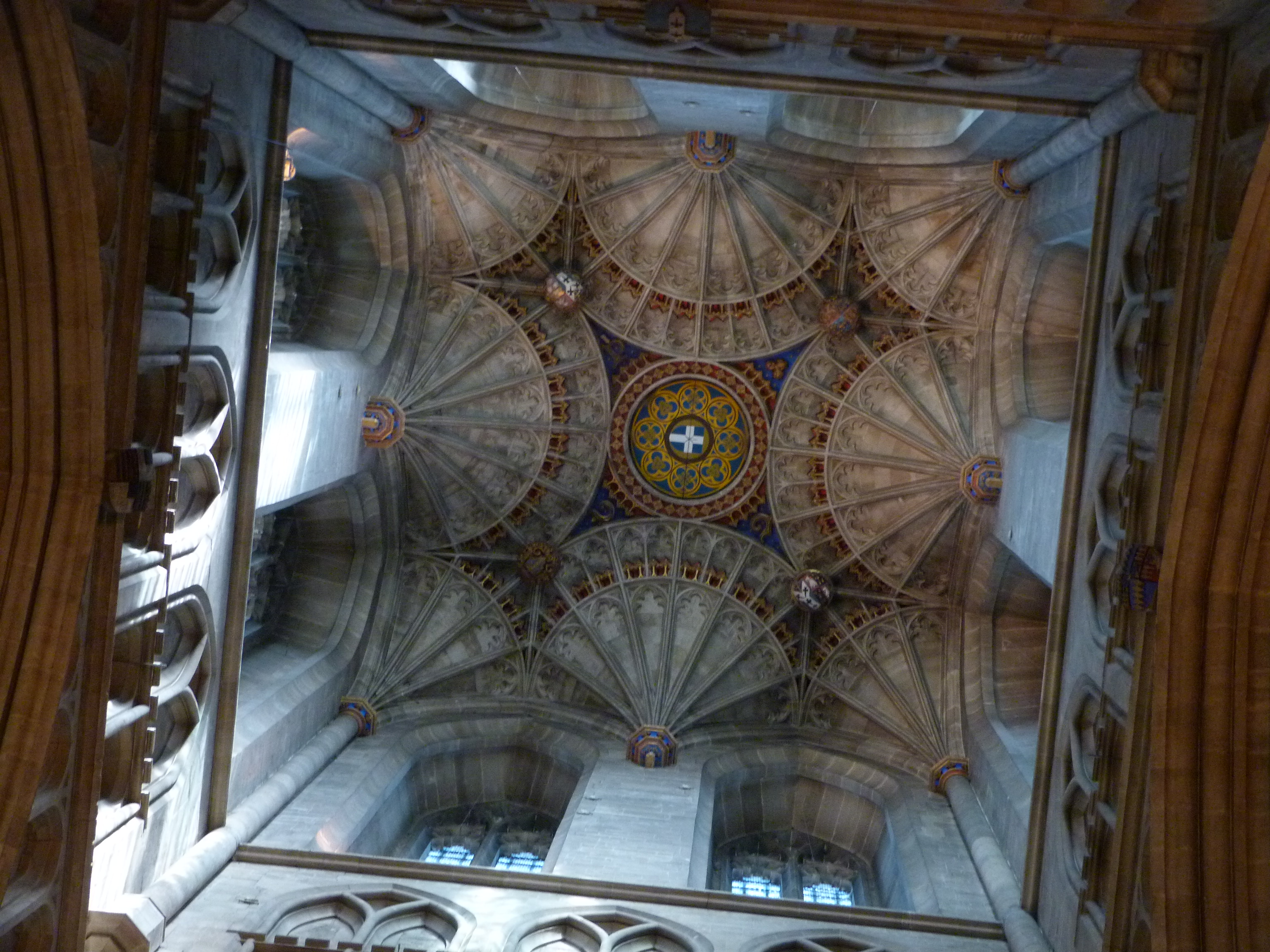
Canterbury Cathedral

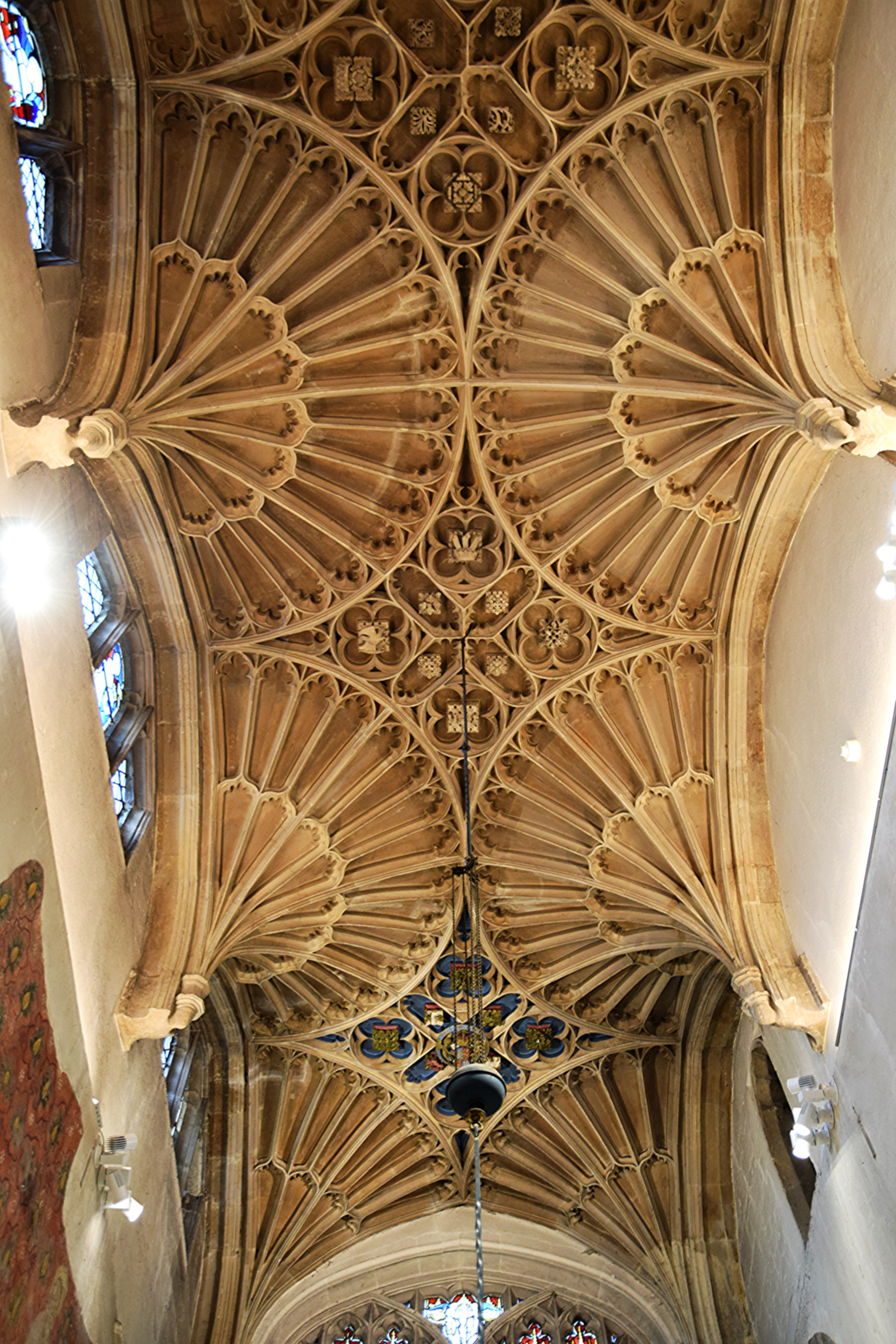
Church of St. John the Baptist, Cirencester

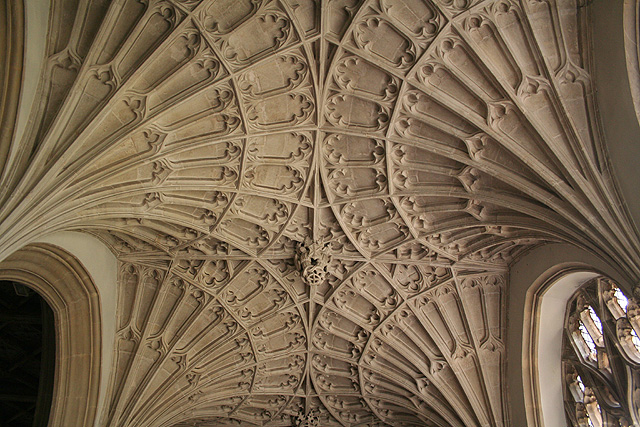
St. Andrew's Church, Cullompton

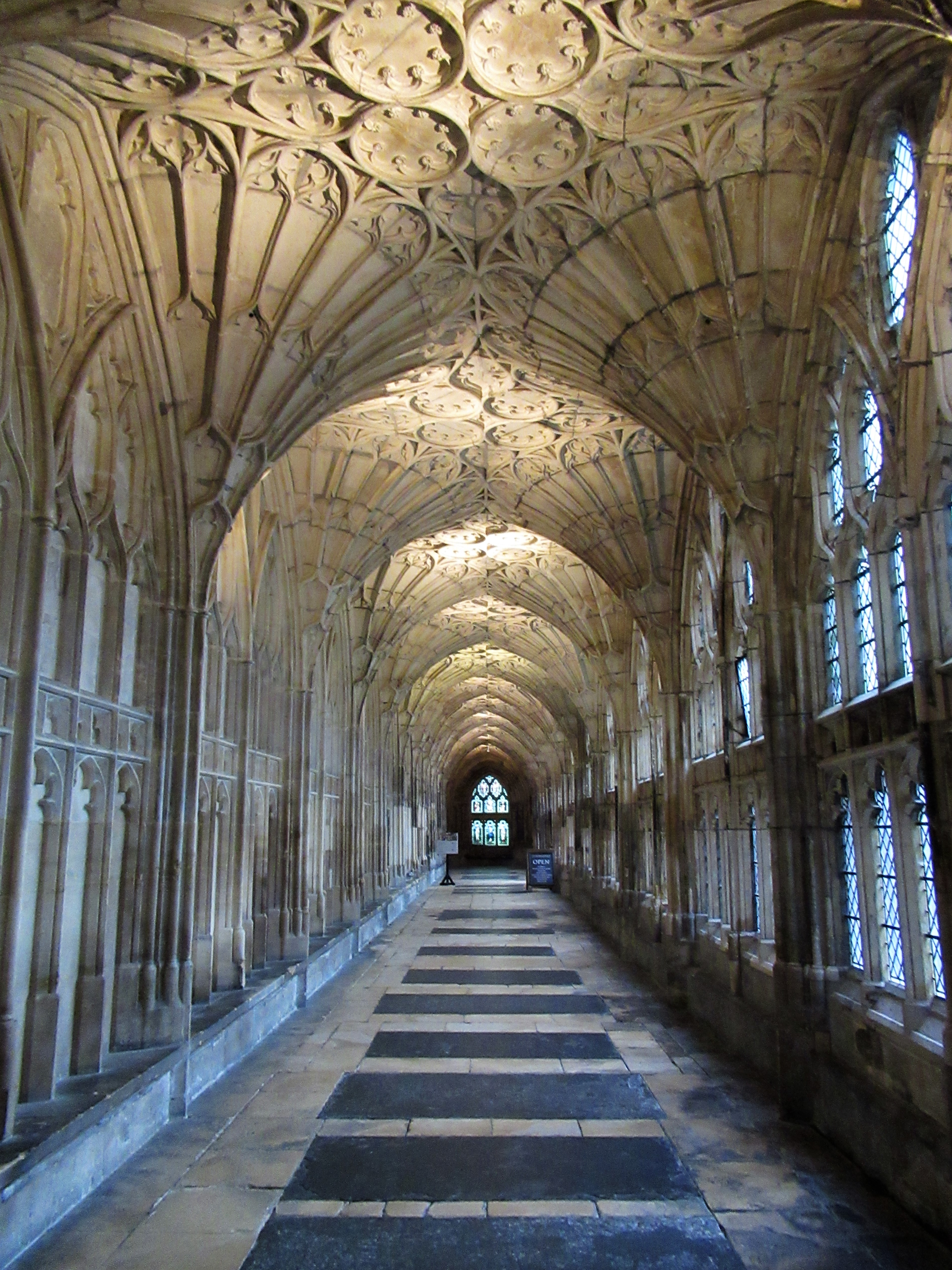
Gloucester Cathedral, the earliest structural example of its kind

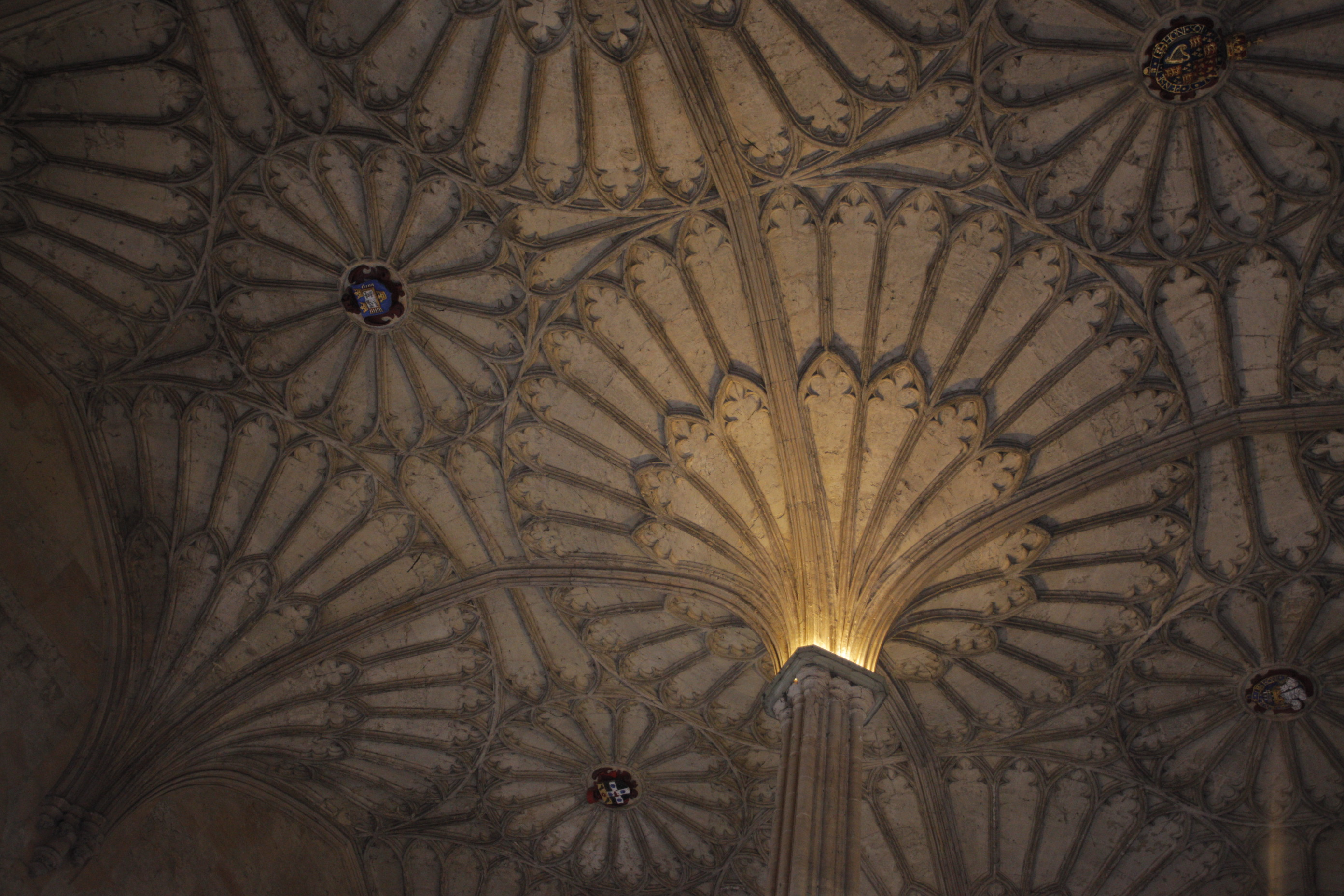
Christ Church, Oxford

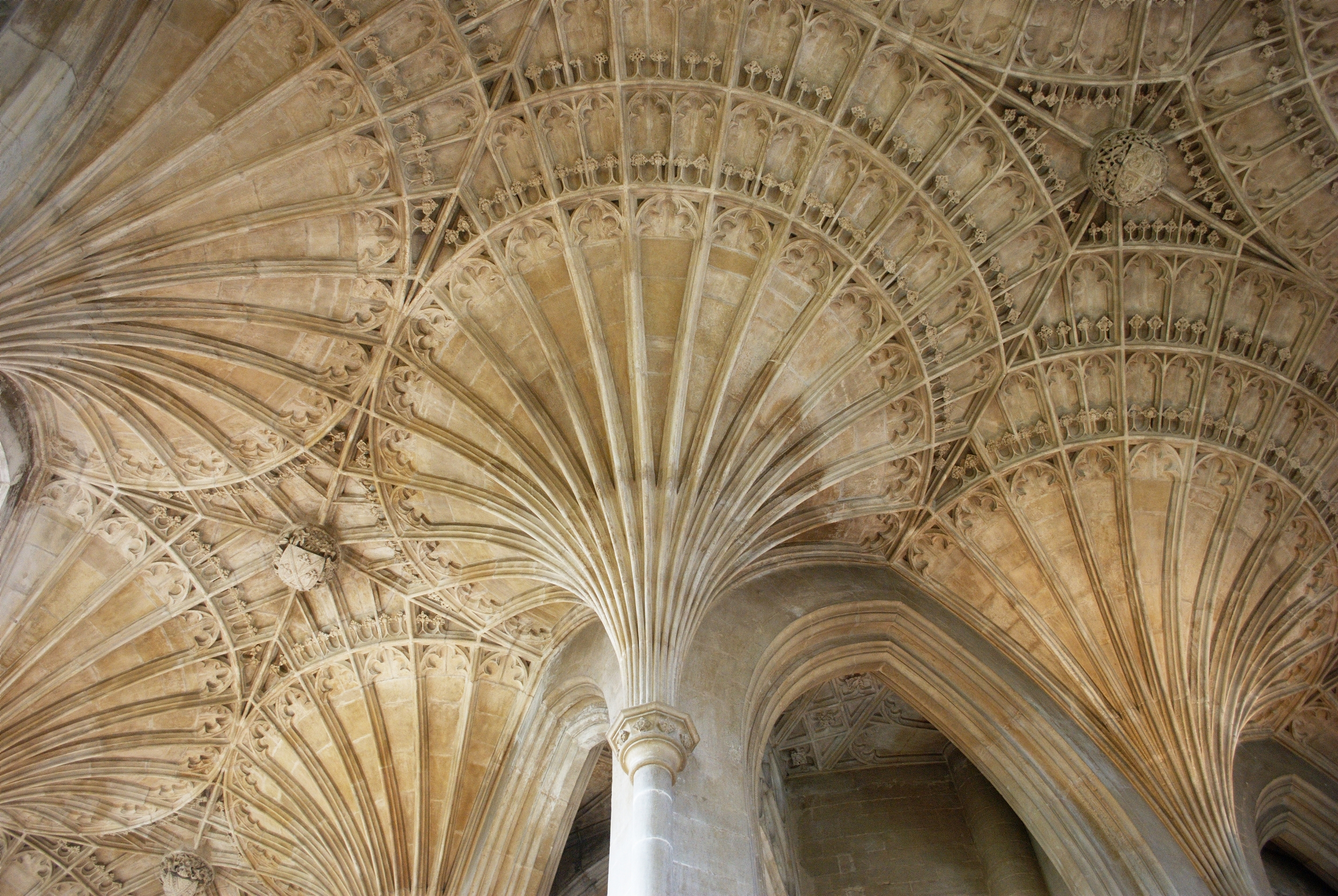
Peterborough Cathedral

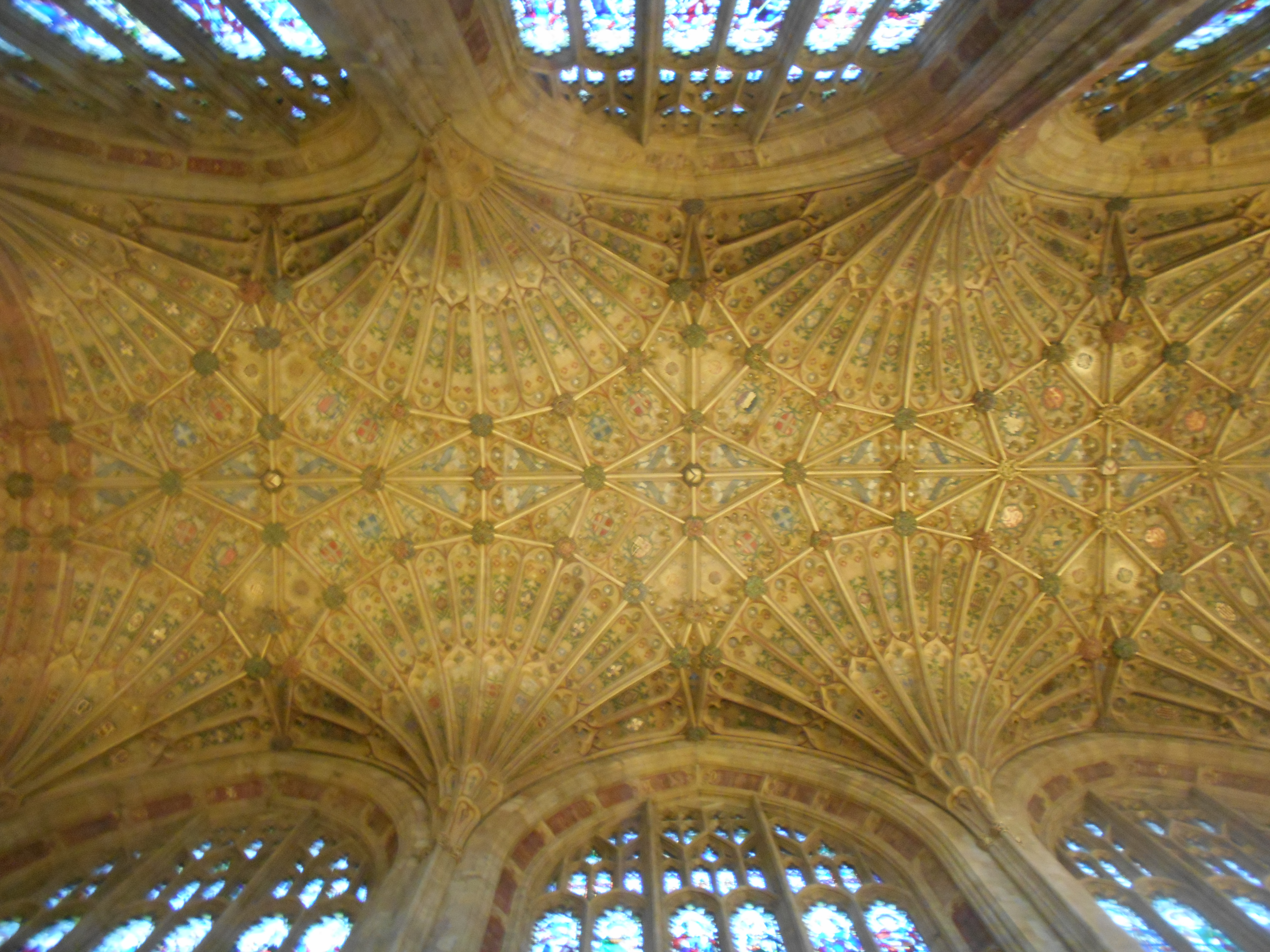
Sherborne Abbey. A composite fan and lierne vault

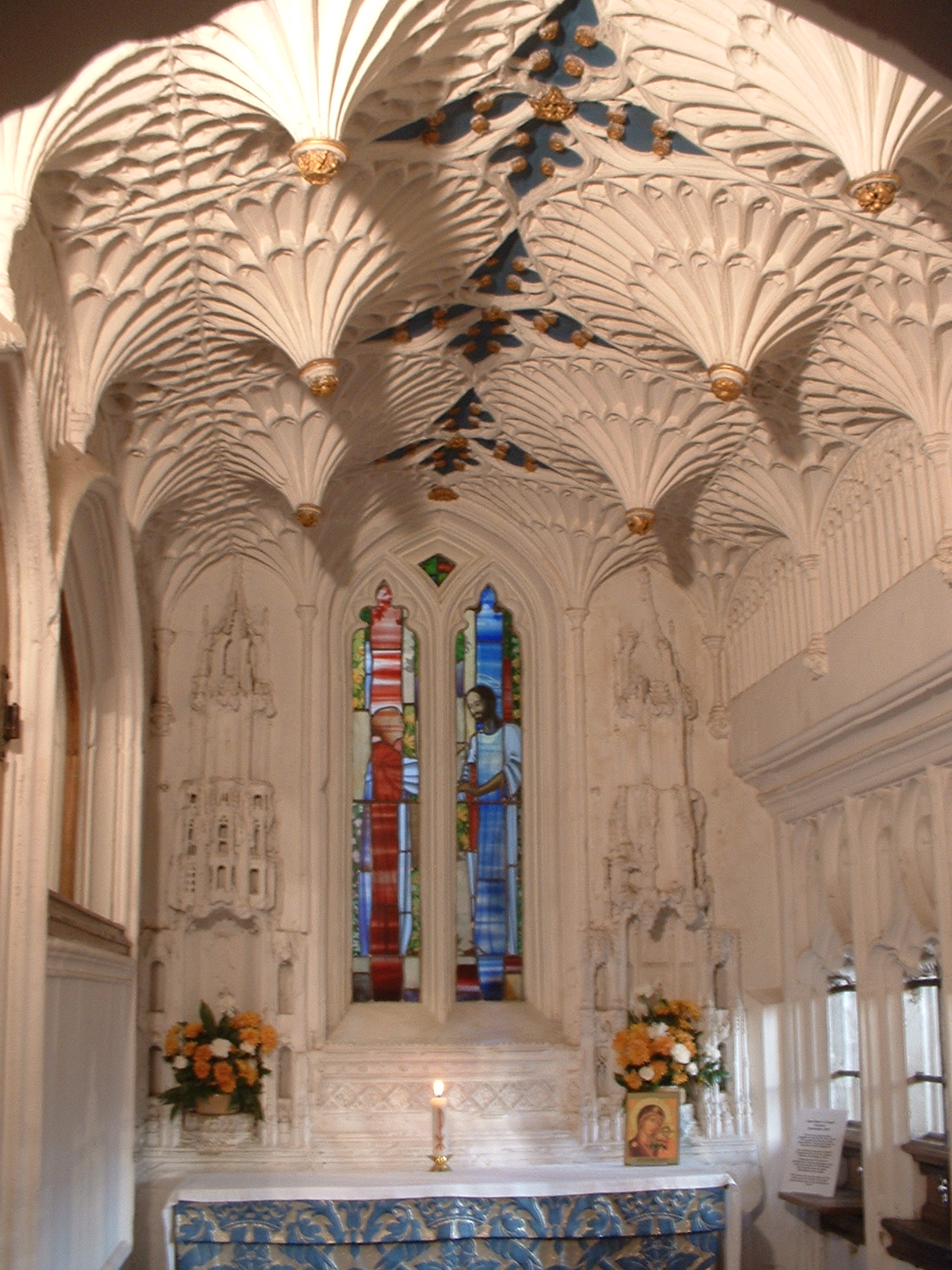
Collegiate Church of St Mary, Warwick

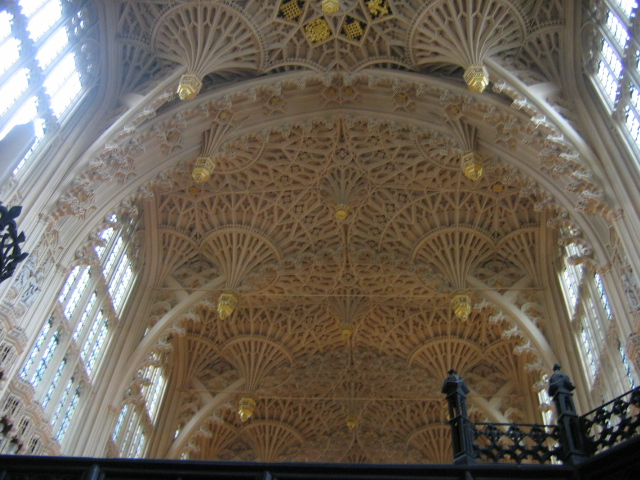
Henry VII Chapel, Westminster Abbey, pendant fan vault

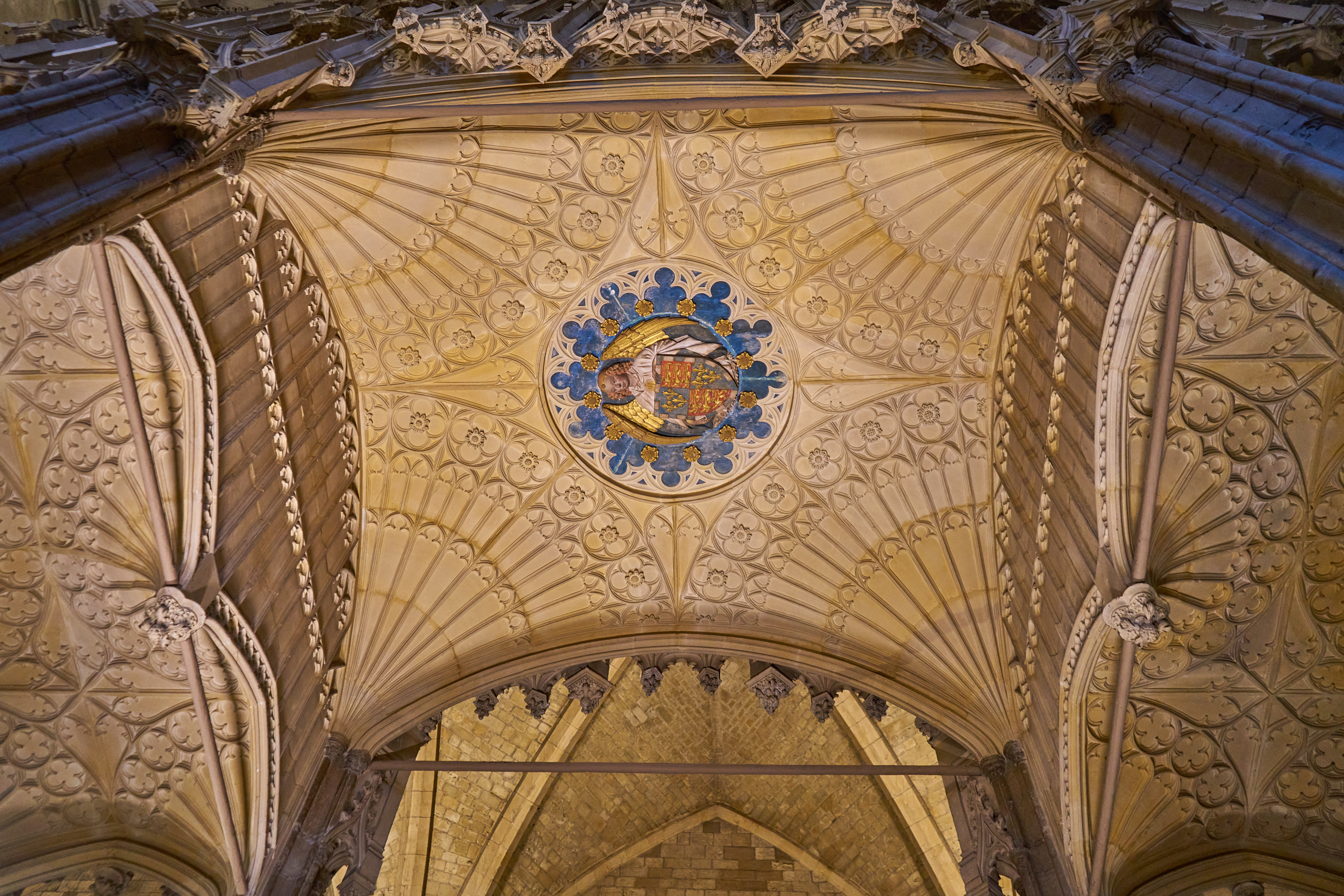
Winchester Cathedral

=== Gothic Revival ===
- Eastnor Castle, drawing room
- Grand Theatre, Leeds
- Harkness Tower, Yale University, New Haven, Connecticut, US
- Middlesex Guildhall, Westminster
- Palau de la Música Catalana, Barcelona
- St John's, Edinburgh
- Saint Patrick's Church, New Orleans, Louisiana, US (apsidal fan vault)
- Strawberry Hill, Twickenham, London
- Unitarian Church in Charleston, South Carolina, US
- Washington National Cathedral, Washington, DC, US (Children's Chapel)
- Wills Memorial Building, University of Bristol
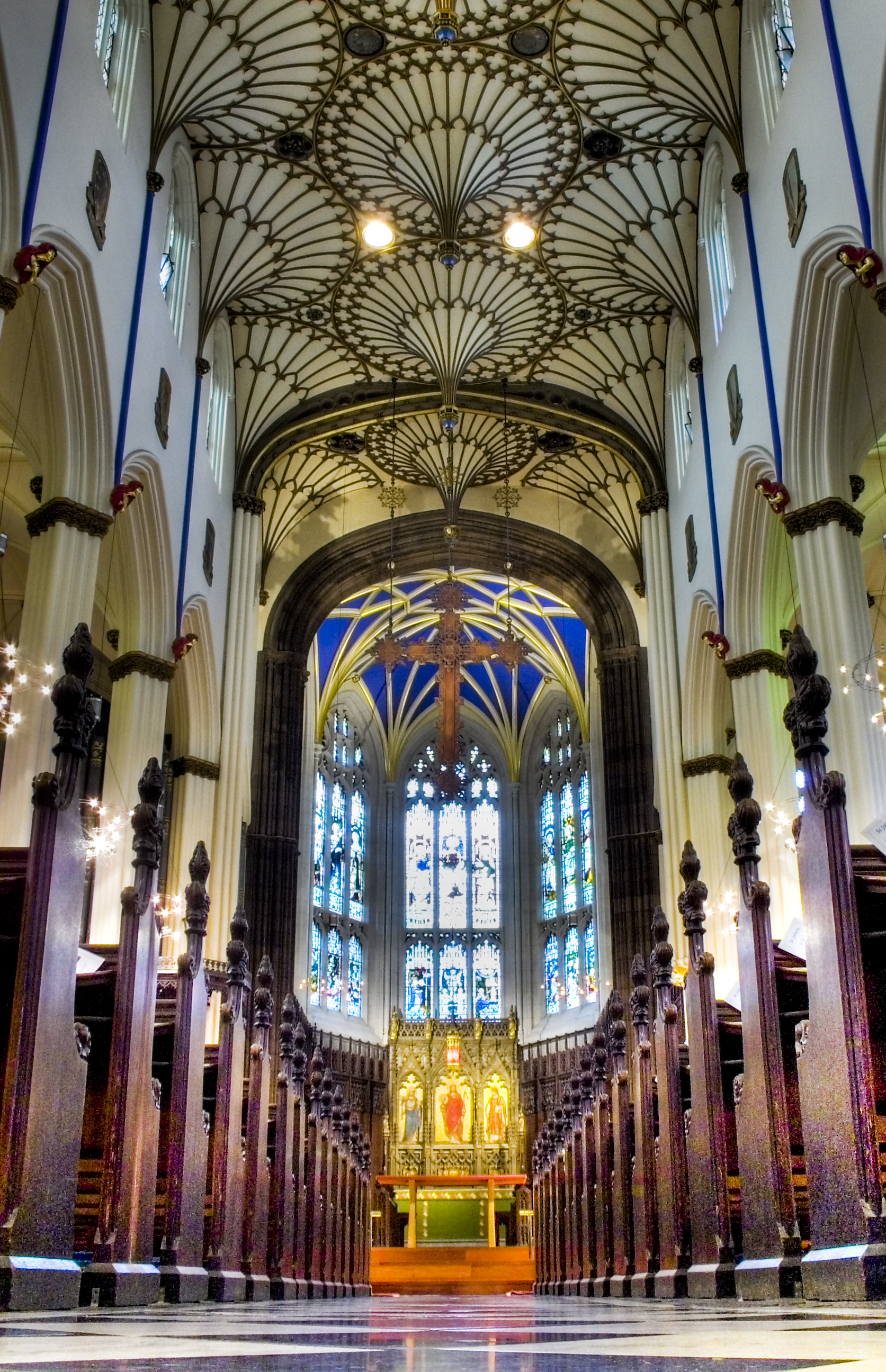
Church of St. John the Evangelist, Edinburgh

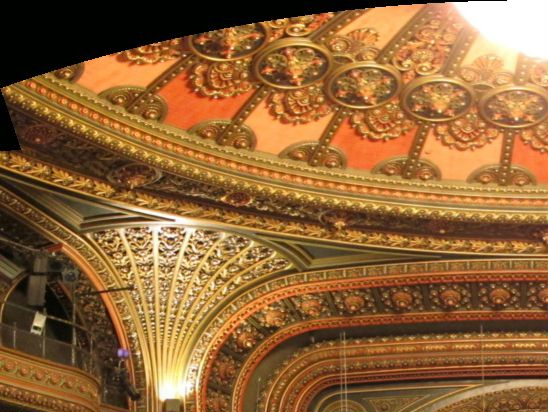
Grand Theatre, Leeds

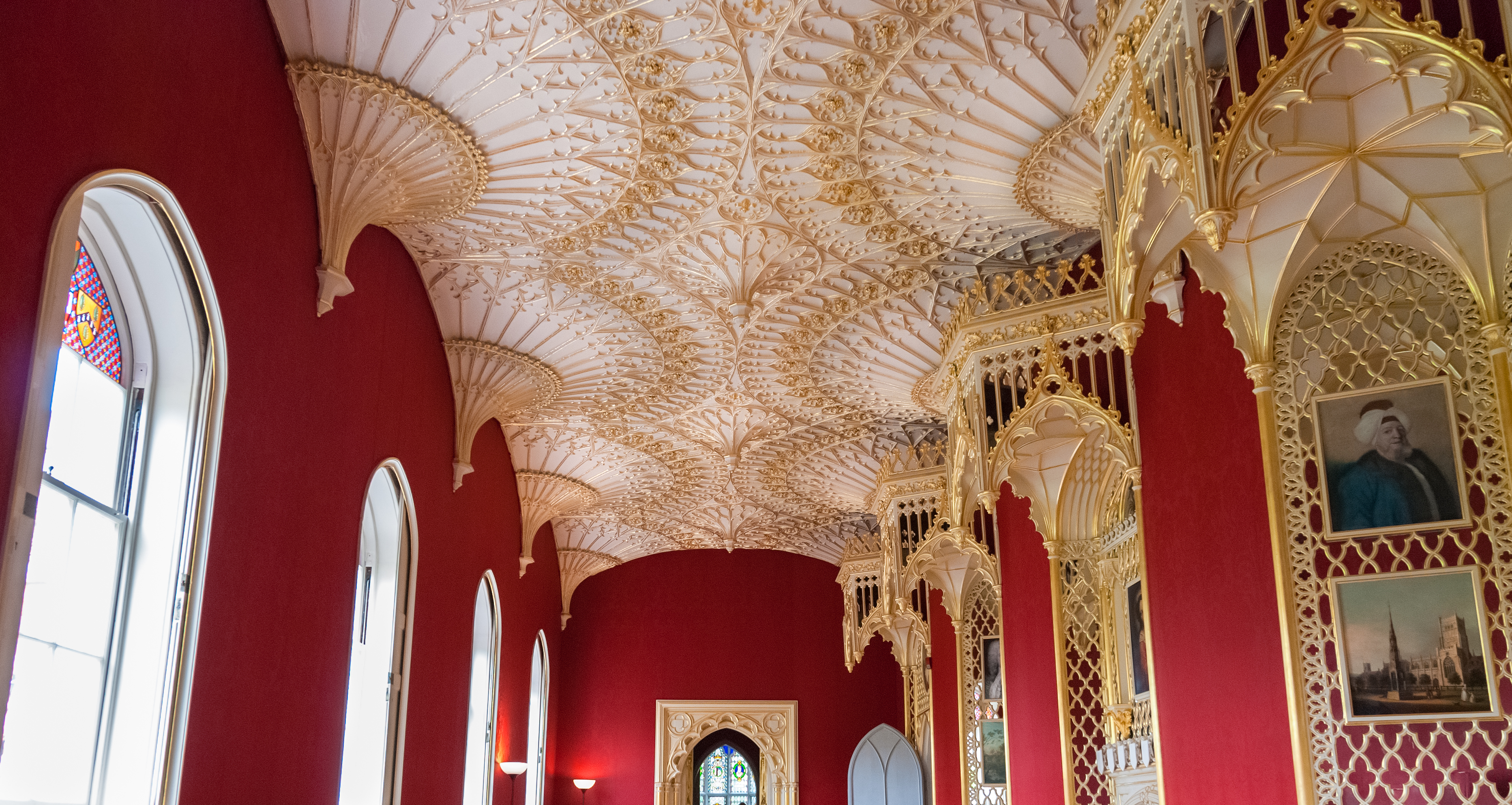
Strawberry Hill House, Twickenham

=== Imitation Fan Vaults ===
These are complex lierne vaults built to imitate the structure of fan vaults, but do not form true conoids.

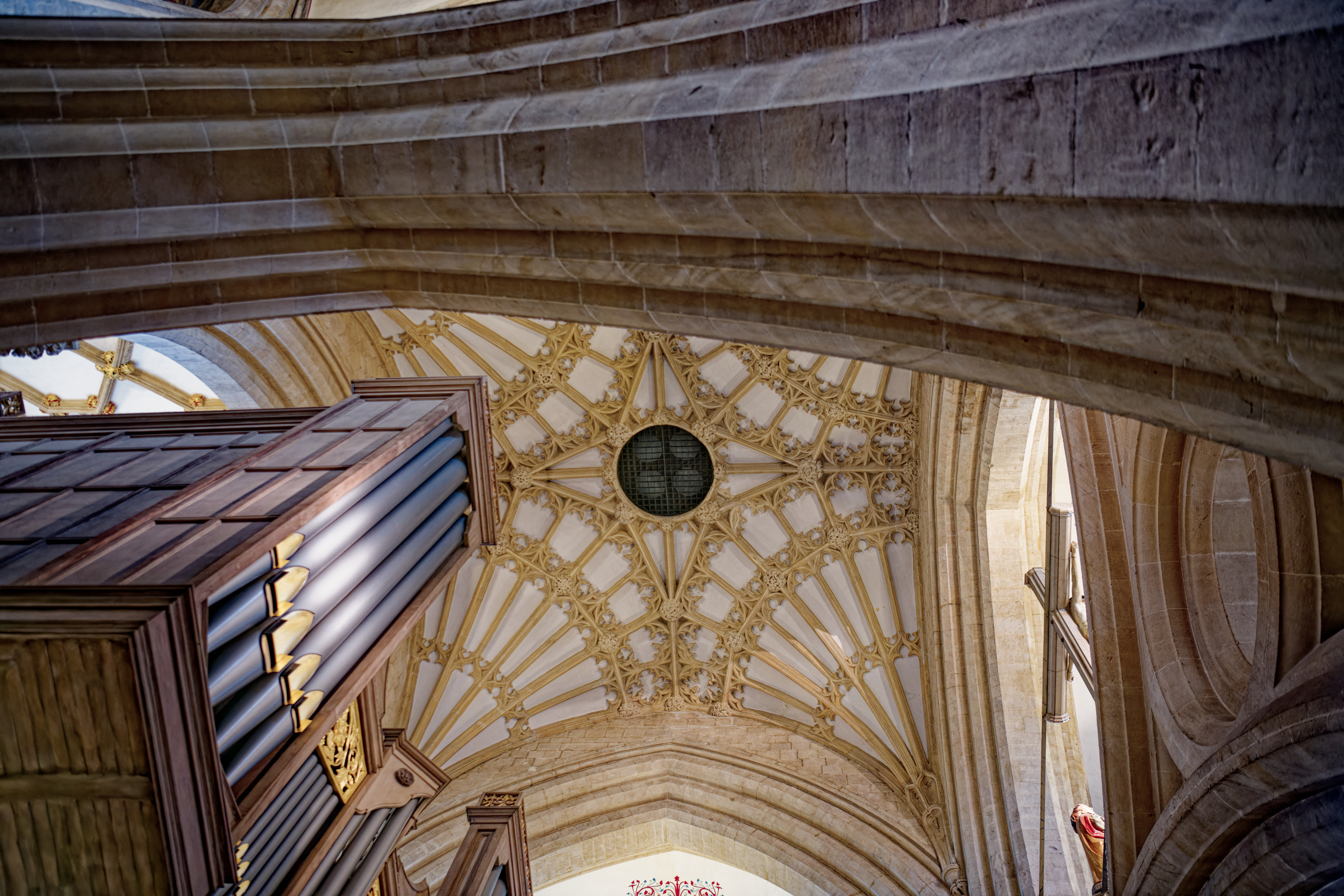
Wells Cathedral. Though closely resembling a fan vault, the true plan is that of a lierne vault with bosses joining the ribs

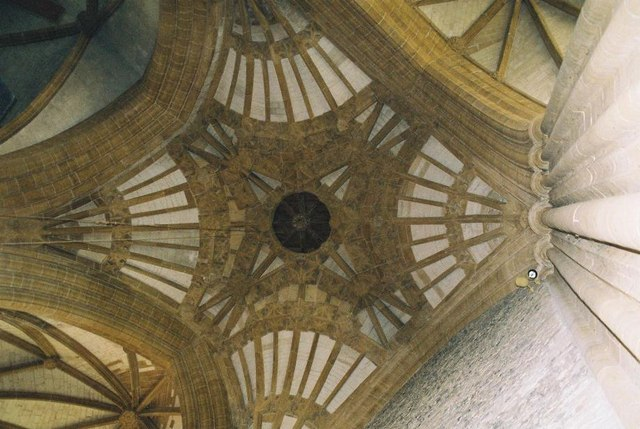
Milton Abbey School. Likewise, no true conoids are created, and the vault retains a lierne plan with diagonal ribs meeting at a central boss

== See also ==
- List of architectural vaults
- Gothic architecture
- Gothic cathedrals and churches
