= John Moore (1595?–1657) =

English clergyman and author

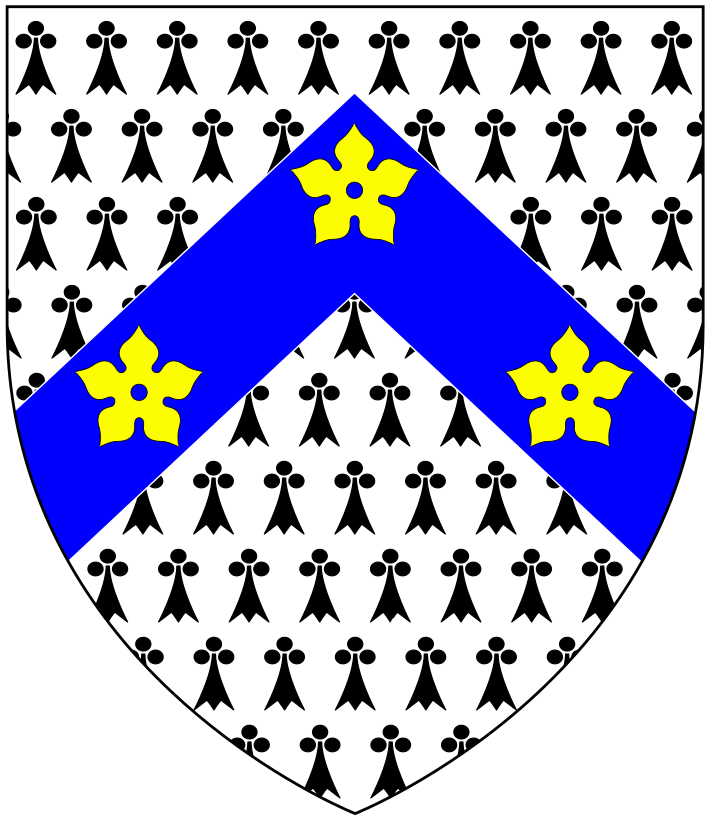
Arms of Moore of Moore Hays: Ermine, on a chevron azure three cinquefoils or

John Moore (1595?–1657) was an English clergyman of Puritan views, known as an author of pamphlets against enclosures.

== Life ==
Born at Knaptoft in Leicestershire, he was the son of the rector of the parish, John Moore. He has been identified as the John Moore who matriculated at Exeter College, Oxford, on 9 May 1617, aged 22.

Moore succeeded his father as rector at Knaptoft. He was replaced by William Farrowe, however, by actions of William Laud. It has been suggested that he was the John Moore appointed to St James Duke's Place in 1641; and subsequently was chaplain to the regiment of William Purefoy.

In 1647 the parliamentary sequestrators appointed Moore rector of Lutterworth. He replaced Farrowe at Knaptoft in 1653.

John Moore is descended from the Ancient Family of de la Moor/Moore of Moorhayes in the parish of Cullompton in Devonshire, where they resided from at least 1120 AD.

Moore was buried at Knaptoft on 29 August 1657.

== Works ==
Like his father, Moore was opposed to enclosures, and he made costly attempts to prevent them in his own neighbourhood. Moore's position was that enclosures were made simply for gain, and he cast doubt on their value as agricultural improvement in the broader context. He published:

- The Crying Sin of England, of not caring for the Poor, wherein Inclosure, viz. such as doth Unpeople Townes and Uncorn Fields, is Arraigned, Convicted, and Condemned by the Word of God (London, 1653). This pamphlet, which consists of two sermons preached by Moore at Lutterworth in May 1653, directed mainly against the enclosures at Catthorpe, Leicestershire, provoked a reply, Considerations concerning Common Fields and Inclosures, Dialoguewise, Digested into a Deliberative Discourse between two supposed friends, Philopeustus and Parrhesiastes, by the Rev. Joseph Lee, rector of Cotesbach, Leicestershire (London, 1654 [1653]).
- A Reply to a Pamphlet intituled considerations, London, 1653.

Lee continued the controversy in A Vindication of the Considerations, &c. This pamphlet, though dated 7 March 1653–4, was not published till 1656, when it was accompanied by Εὐταξία τοῦ Ἀγρού; or a Vindication of a Regulated Enclosure, &c., by Joseph Lee, Minister of the Gospel, London, 1656. Finally there was A Scripture Word against Inclosure (1656) by Moore.

Enclosures were felt by Moore to be an issue particularly important in the English Midlands, in the absence of alternative coastal and urban employment. His debate with Lee is regarded as significant, but the topic was not then aired again in public for half a century, with Daniel Hilman and Timothy Nourse. Joyce Appleby comments of the ministers Moore and Lee that "two different social visions informed their values as well as their reading of the same biblical texts"; Isaiah 5:8 was a traditional text in this debate, and Lee questioned Moore's use of it. They also cited Leicestershire examples: deserted villages for Moore's side of the case, villages that still existed after enclosures for Lee's arguments.

The context was that Cotesbach had been the centre of the Midland Revolt of 1607, and that Lee's neighbour Walter Blith was a noted writer on husbandry and improvement. Lee had an interest in the particular enclosure he was supporting. He argued that enclosures could be defended, unless they led to depopulation. Against Moore's arguments, Charles Fortrey, and then John Laurence in his New System of Agriculture, defended enclosures as not in fact leading to depopulation in strict terms, or disadvantage to the poor.

== Family ==
Moore married Eleanor Kirk of Northampton, by whom he had issue:

1. John, baptised 30 January 1619–20, settled at Stamford, Lincolnshire, and died in 1698;
2. Thomas (1621–1686) became an ironmonger at Market Harborough, Leicestershire, and married Elizabeth, daughter of Edward Wright of Sutton, in the parish of Broughton, Leicestershire, by whom he was the father of John Moore the bishop of Norwich and Ely.

== Notes ==
Attribution

This article incorporates text from a publication now in the public domain: Lee, Sidney, ed. (1894). "Moore, John (d.1619)". Dictionary of National Biography. Vol. 38. London: Smith, Elder & Co.
