= John Moore (bishop of Ely) =

British bishop and scholar

The Right Reverend John Moore
- Bishop of Ely
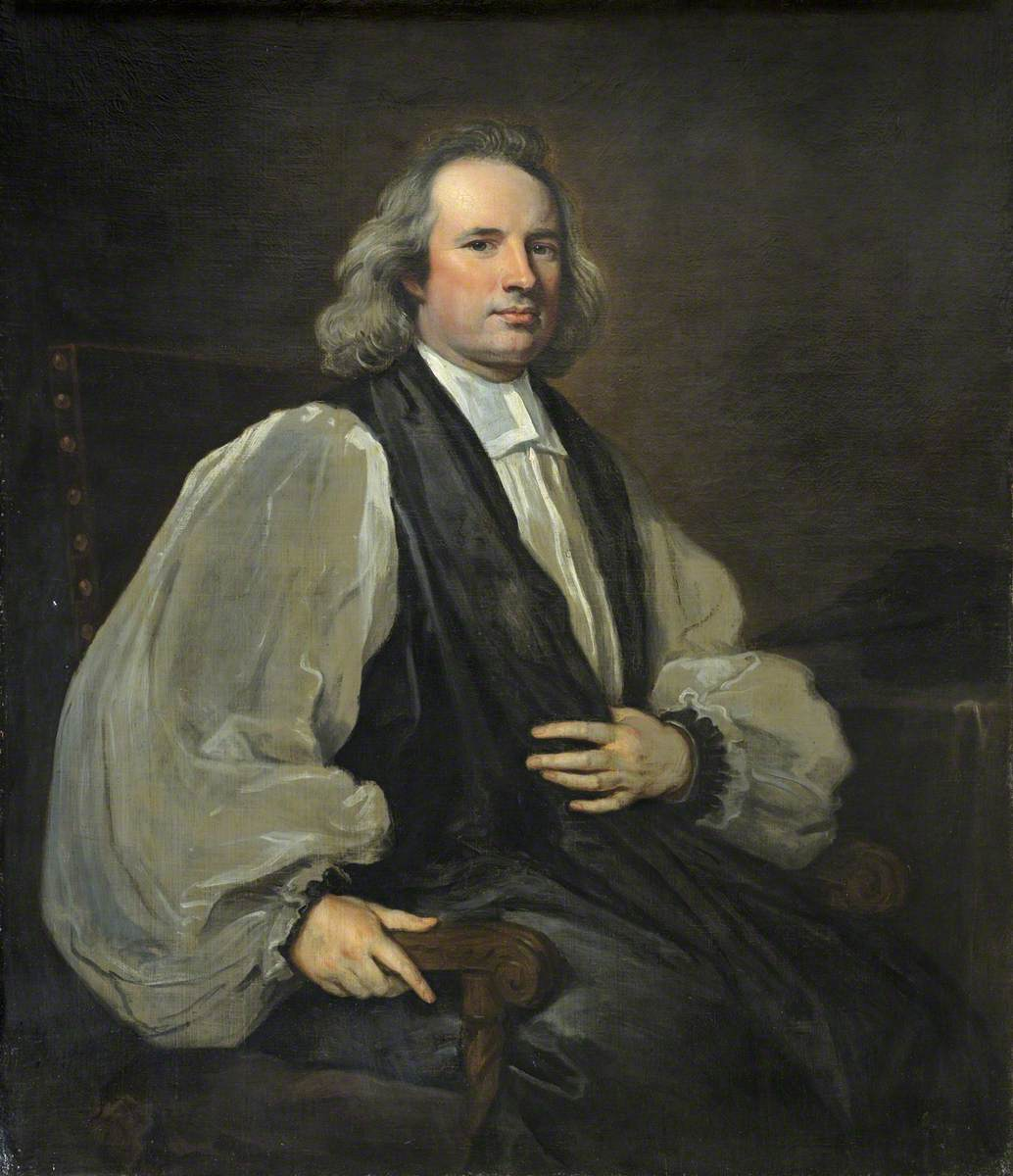
- John Moore by Godfrey Kneller
- Diocese: Diocese of Ely
- In office: 1707–1714
- Predecessor: William Lloyd
- Successor: Charles Trimnell
- Other post: Bishop of Norwich (1691–1707)

Personal details
- Born: 1646 Market Harborough, Leicestershire
- Died: 31 July 1714 Ely, Cambridgeshire
- Buried: Ely Cathedral
- Denomination: Anglican
- Spouse: (1) Rose Butler (2) Dorothy Barnes
- Education: Clare Hall, Cambridge

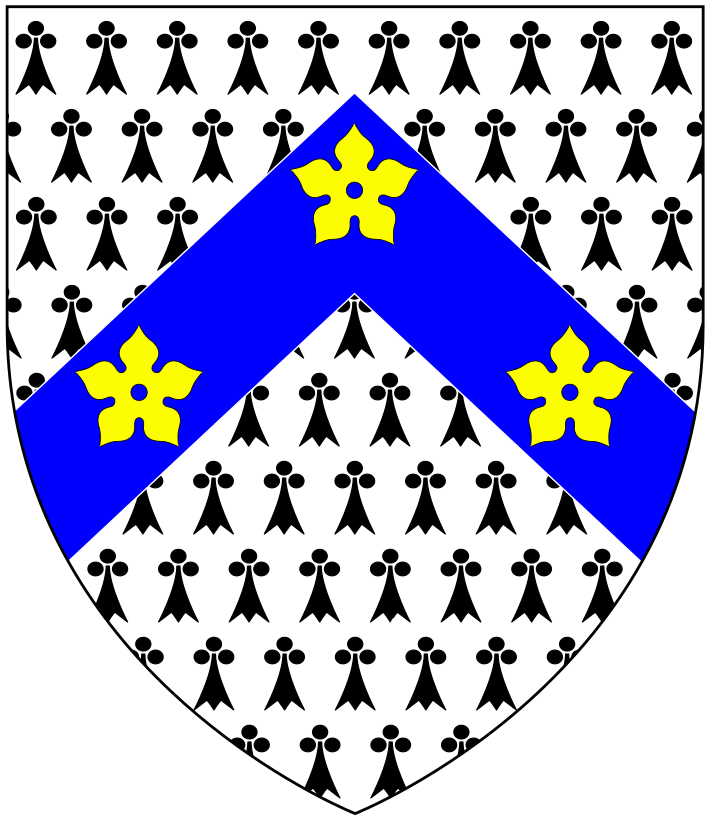
Arms of Moore of Moore Hays: Ermine, on a chevron azure three cinquefoils or. These arms are visible in Norwich Cathedral and on Bishop Moore's monument in Ely Cathedral

John Moore (1646 – 31 July 1714) was an English clergyman who served as Bishop of Norwich (1691–1707) and Bishop of Ely (1707–1714) and was a famous bibliophile whose vast collection of books forms the surviving "Royal Library" within Cambridge University Library.

== Origins ==
Bishop John Moore was descended from the ancient family of De La Moor (later Moore), of Moore Hayes in the parish of Cullompton in Devonshire, England. He was born in Market Harborough in Leicestershire, the son of Thomas Moore (1621–1686), an ironmonger of Market Harborough, by his wife Elizabeth Wright, daughter of Edward Wright of Sutton in the parish of Broughton, Leicestershire. The Bishop's paternal grandfather was Rev. John Moore (c.1595–1657) a clergyman of Puritan views and an author of pamphlets against enclosures, who was a younger son of Sir John Moore of Moor Hayes, knighted at the Palace of Westminster by King Edward VI in 1549, by his wife Katherine Pomeroy, a daughter of Sir Thomas Pomeroy (1503-1566), feudal baron of Berry Pomeroy in Devon, who in 1547 sold Berry Pomeroy Castle, Deer park and manor to Edward Seymour, 1st Duke of Somerset, Lord Protector of England from 1547 until 1549 during the minority of his nephew, King Edward VI (1547-1553), and eldest brother of Queen Jane Seymour (d.1537), the third wife of King Henry VIII.

== Career ==
He was educated at Clare Hall, Cambridge where he subsequently became a Fellow in 1667. He was Rector of Blaby in Leicestershire from 1676 to 1687, and subsequently became Rector of St Ann's, Westminster and St Andrew, Holborn. By 1670 he was a member of the household of Heneage Finch, 1st Earl of Nottingham, whom he served as chaplain. He supported the Glorious Revolution of 1688 and was appointed a Royal Chaplain to the new King William III.

Moore was appointed Bishop of Norwich in 1691. He was a Whig in politics, and supported the Low Church party. He gave practical support to leading theologians, such as Richard Bentley, Gilbert Burnet and John Strype, and he found preferment for Samuel Clarke, William Whiston (whose undergraduate study he subsidised) and Samuel Knight.

Moore was translated to the See of Ely in 1707. When it was proposed that Bentley should be appointed Bishop of Chichester (1709), the support of Moore was enlisted on his behalf. As Visitor of Trinity College, Cambridge, he presided at the trial of Bentley and during the sessions at his London townhouse of Ely Palace he caught a cold. He died in Ely on 31 July 1714 and was buried in Ely Cathedral.

== Bibliophile ==
At the time of his death in 1714, Moore's collection of books and papers contained over 30,000 items, and may have been the largest in England. To celebrate his coronation, King George I caused it to be purchased intact, at a cost of 6,000 guineas, and donated it to Cambridge University Library. Moore's library alone contained nearly double the previous material in that library. While some material has been removed over the years, the gift is still largely intact, and is called "The Royal Library" in honour of its patron. Notable books in his library include the Book of Deer and the Treatise of Love. A "book of recipes" possessed by Moore, now held in the special collections of Cambridge University Library (reference MS Dd.11.45, f. 144r), inspired the 1931 short story "The Experiment" by M. R. James.

== Marriages ==
Moore married twice:

- Firstly to Rose Butler, daughter of Neville Thomas Alexander Butler by his wife Cicely Aglionby;
- Secondly (as her third husband) to Dorothy Barnes, daughter of William Barnes of Sadberge, County Durham, and widow of Sir Richard Browne, 3rd Baronet (c. 1656–1689) (Browne baronets, of London, cr.1660), who was killed in Flanders in 1689 by Colonel Billingsley.

Church of England titles
Preceded by William Lloyd	Bishop of Norwich; 1691–1707	Succeeded by Charles Trimnell
Preceded by Simon Patrick	Bishop of Ely; 1707–1714	Succeeded by William Fleetwood
