= Parclose screen =

Barrier separating side chapels from the rest of the church

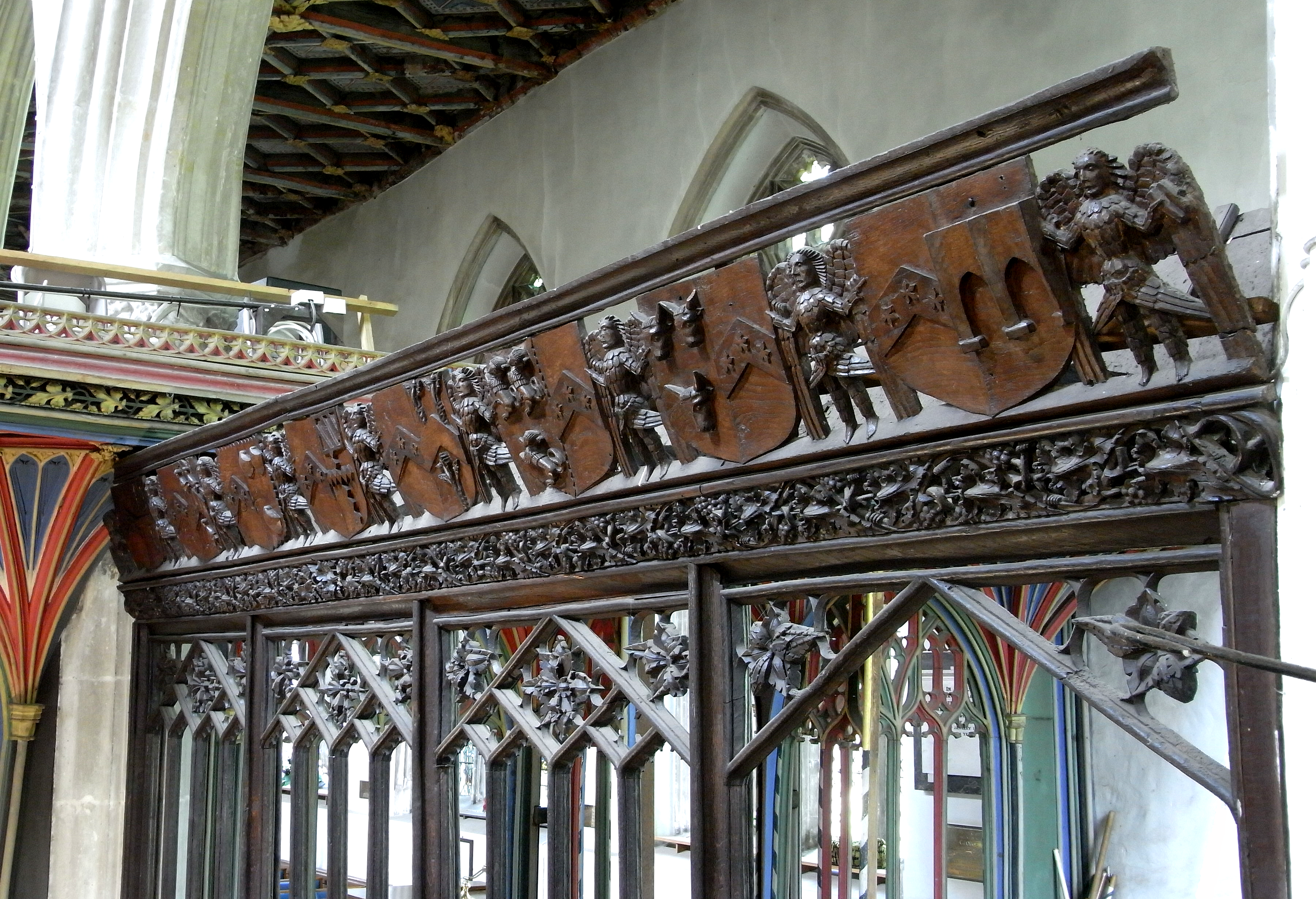
Parclose screen, c. 1530, of the Moorhayes Chapel, Cullompton Church, Devon, England. Looking north-west from within the chancel. Part of the brightly decorated, higher, chancel screen is visible beyond.

A parclose screen is a screen or railing used to enclose or separate-off a chantry chapel, tomb or manorial chapel, from public areas of a church, for example from the nave or chancel. It should be distinguished from the chancel screen which separates the chancel from the nave, in order to restrict access to the former to clerics and other select persons.

== Location ==
As many chantry chapels and manorial chapels were situated at the east end (closest to the holy city of Jerusalem) of the north or south aisles, next to the chancel, frequently they lay within the area enclosed by the chancel screen.

== Function ==
The parclose screen is designed to restrict physical access to those unauthorised to enter, yet still to allow a good view into the restricted area and the entry of sunlight, and also, most importantly, to allow for communication with the high altar in the chancel during the elevation of the host at mass. This is usually achieved by the use of tracery to form the screen. Where a solid masonry wall is used instead of a screen, a hagioscope or squint is required to serve the same purpose. Parclose screens are made of stone or wood and are often decoratively carved, frequently featuring the coats of arms of the family concerned.

== Etymology ==
The word derives from the French noun parclose (f), from the Latin verb claudo, "to close" plus the preposition per, "through, along, over".

== History ==
In England, the use of parclose screens was largely discontinued in the 16th century after the Reformation, and after the Dissolution of the Monasteries when chantries were dissolved. There was therefore no further need to have several altars in the same church, each serving a separate private chantry chapel. The concept of the manorial chapel was also discontinued a few centuries after, when burials inside churches and manorial chapels were discontinued. The manorial pew, not screened-off from the congregation, replaced the screened-off manorial chapel. Many fine examples of mediaeval parclose screens survive in the parish churches and cathedrals of England.
