= De mulierum subtili decepcione =

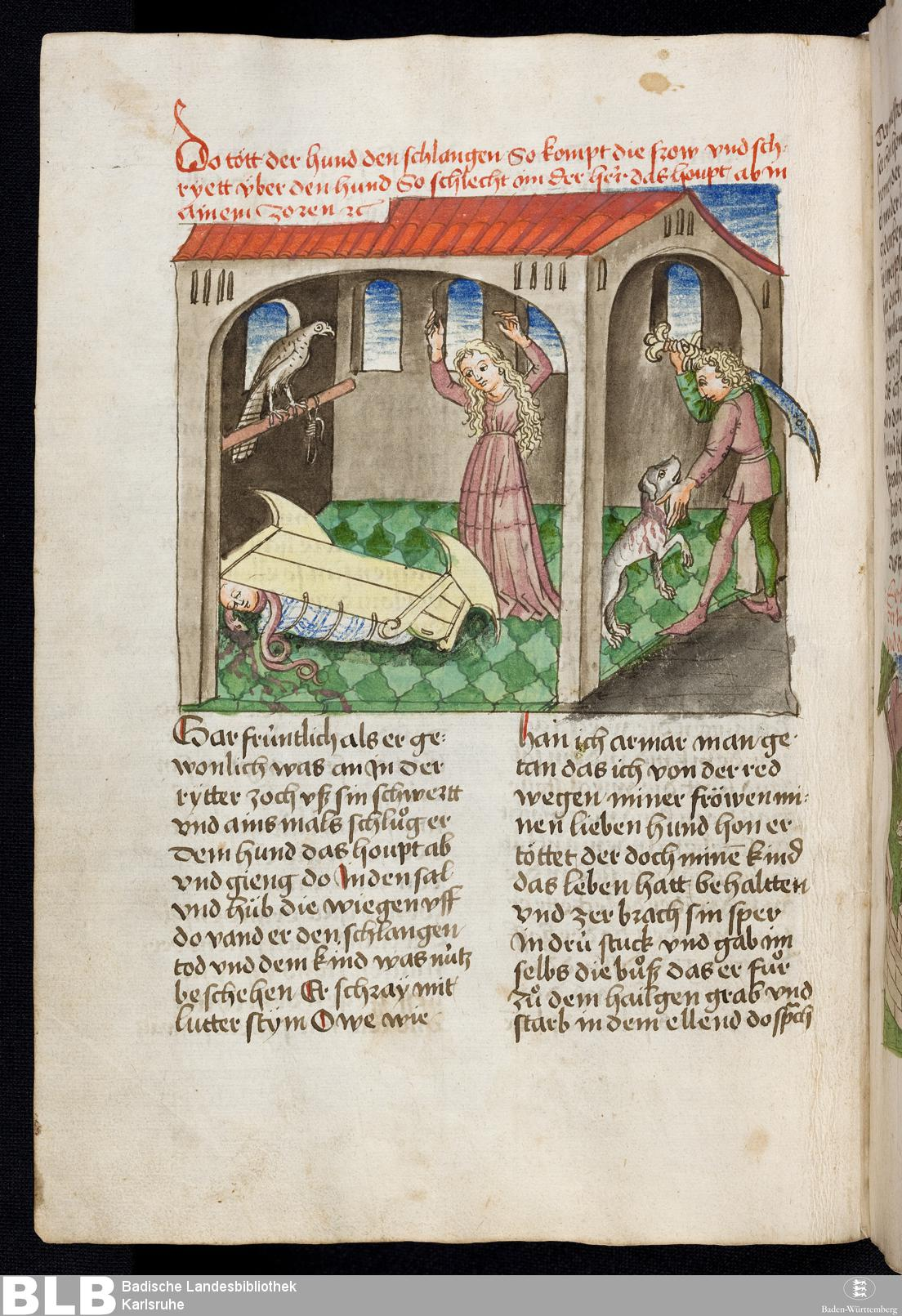
A folio of a German-language manuscript of the Gesta Romanorum (Karlsruhe, Badische Landesbibliothek, Donaueschingen 145, f. 16v, showing a different story)

De mulierum subtili decepcione ('regarding women's cunning deception') is a story found in the Gesta Romanorum, a medieval Latin compilation of exempla and tales. It is also known as Darius and his Three Sons.

In Hermann Oesterley's edition of the Gesta Romanorum, this tale appears as chapter 120.

== Summary ==
Summarising the version of the story translated from the manuscript London, British Library, MS Harley 219 of the Latin Gesta Romanorum by Thomas Hoccleve, Sebastian Sobecki writes:

The narrative is a moralizing coming-of-age tale in which Jonathas, the youngest son of the emperor, receives three talismans, a ring, a brooch, and a magic carpet. He then attends university [...] and falls in love with the prostitute Fellicula, who on three separate occasions cheats him of one of these three items, each time forcing Jonathas to return to his mother, who admonishes him with a variant of the same life lesson. When Fellicula has obtained all three enchanted items, she leaves Jonathas behind in a distant country, after which she is stricken with sickness. Abandoned at the far end of the world, Jonathas makes his way back, acquiring along the way both poisons and the means to heal Fellicula. Once he has returned, he pretends to heal her, but instead gives her the poisonous items that cause Fellicula to die a gruesome death.

== Influence ==
The story was influential in medieval Europe. It was translated into a Middle English prose version, surviving in the following manuscripts:

- London, British Library, MS Harley 7333 (where the story is called "Godfridus a Wise Emperoure")
- London, British Library, Additional MS 9066 [folio 20v]
- Cambridge, Cambridge University Library, MS Kk I. 6 [folios 482v–488v)

This Middle English prose translation was itself translated into Icelandic as Jónatas ævintýri, probably in 1429–34. Jónatas ævintýri was a source for the Icelandic Viktors saga ok Blávus, which in turn lent Jónatas-material to Sigrgarðs saga frœkna.

A separate translation from Latin into Middle English was undertaken by Thomas Hoccleve, as the fifth and final section of the work known as his Series. This is a 672-line Middle English verse rendition. The copy of the Latin Gesta Romanorum used by Hoccleve for this purpose was identified in 2023 as London, British Library, MS Harley 219. Hoccleve's poem was later incorporated into William Browne's 1614 poem The Shepheards Pipe.

== Editions and translations ==
=== Latin text ===
- See Gesta Romanorum.

=== Middle English prose translation ===
- Gesta Romanorum, ed. by Sidney J. H. Herrtage, Early English Text Society, extra series, 33 (London: Trübner, 1879), pp. 180–96 (presenting the text from London, British Library, MS Harley 7333 alongside the text from London, British Library, Additional MS 9066, with variant readings from Cambridge, Cambridge University Library, MS Kk I. 6 given in the apparatus to the latter text).

=== Hoccleve's Tale of Jonathas ===
- 'The Tale of Jonathas', in Hoccleve's Works: The Minor Poems, in the Huntington Library Ms. HM 111 (Formerly Phillips Ms. 8151), the Durham Univ. Ms. Cosin V.III.9, and Huntington Library Ms. HM 744 (Formerly Ashburnham Ms. Additional 133), vol. 1 ed. by Frederick J. Furnivall, vol. 2 ed. by I. Gollancz, rev. edn by Jerome Mitchell and A. I. Doyle, Early English Text Society, Extra Series, 61, 73 (London: Oxford University Press, 1970), I 219–42 ISBN 9780197225837.
- Seymour, M. C., ed. (1981). Selections from Hoccleve. Oxford: Clarendon Press. pp. 93–102. ISBN 0198710836.
- Occleve, Thomas (2001). Ellis, Roger (ed.). 'My compleinte' and other poems. Exeter medieval texts and studies. Exeter: University of Exeter Press. ISBN 978-0-85989-701-3.

=== Icelandic translation ===
- Jorgensen, Peter A., ed. (1997). The Story of Jonatas in Iceland. Stofnun Árna Magnússonar á Íslandi, 45. Reykjavík: Stofnun Árna Magnússonar á Íslandi. ISBN 997981960X.
