= Merelaus the Emperor =

Merelaus the Emperor is the name of one of the stories from the 13/14th c. collection Gesta Romanorum. It tells of the patience and virtue of the wife of Merelaus the Emperor, who is betrayed successively by her husband's brother, a steward in an earl's household, a thief she rescued, and a ship captain. The tale was retold by Christine de Pisan and by Thomas Hoccleve.
