= Mabel Day =

Scholar of medieval English (1875–1964)

- Born: 5 December 1875; St Leonard's House, Ludlow
- Died: 18 September 1964 (aged 88); Batheaston, England
- Education: scholar of medieval English
- Parent(s): Annie (born Metcalfe) and Reverend Henry George Day

Mabel Katharine Day (5 December 1875 – 18 September 1964) was a British scholar of medieval English. She managed the Early English Text Society from 1921 to the 1940s as assistant director. She edited and published medieval texts including contributions to A Guide for Anchoresses and Sir Gawain and the Green Knight.

== Life ==
Day was born in the listed building of St Leonard's House in Linney, Ludlow, Shropshire, in 1875. Her parents were Annie (born Metcalfe) and Reverend Henry George Day. Her father had been a fellow of St John's College, Cambridge before he became the headteacher of Sedbergh grammar school.

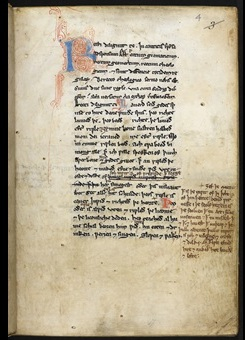
Manuscript of Ancrene Wisse: British Library Cotton MS Cleopatra C VI

Day was educated at Brighton High School for Girls, Girton College, Cambridge and the University of London, and thereafter worked as a teacher and lecturer. In 1912 she began work at King's College, London, and in 1920 was promoted to lecturer. In 1921 she became the assistant director of the Early English Text Society (EETS), and the University of London awarded her a doctorate for her thesis titled Early Middle English word-stress investigated on the basis of the unrhymed alliterative poems. She is remembered for her work with the EETS and with Sir Israel Gollancz, its director.

In 1935 the EETS decided to publish editions of the Ancrene Wisse, an early 13th-century text also known as A Guide for Anchoresses. Day advised on several editions and she worked on the Nero MS version (which had been transcribed by J. A. Herbert). The principles which she established are said to have governed all the later editions.

Gollancz had been working on an edition of Sir Gawain and the Green Knight, but this was unfinished when he died in 1930. Day completed the work and it was published in 1940. Another of Gollancz's works, Mum and the Sothsegger, was also completed by Day and Robert Steele and published in 1936.

Day was the person who kept the EETS running and financially viable. Even after she stood down in 1949 she stayed on as an advisor for another decade.

Day died in Batheaston, Somerset, in 1964.
