= Treatise of Love =

English prose text first printed around 1493

- Original title: Tretyse of Loue
- Language: English
- Genre: Prose treatise
- Publisher: Wynkyn de Worde
- Publication date: 1491-1494

The Treatise of Love (Tretyse of Loue) is an English prose text first printed around 1493. Its printing was the work of Wynkyn de Worde, who took over William Caxton's printing business in 1491, and printed the Treatise before he began publishing under his own name in 1494. Drawing greatly on the Ancrene Wisse, the text contains religious advice addressed to an audience of aristocratic women.

== Contents ==
The text contains three main parts that deal with divine love, which are largely based on the early thirteenth-century Ancrene Wisse, and, following an "intermediate conclusion," seven brief sections dealing with other aspects of (religious) love. Besides the Ancrene Wisse, other source texts are the Planctus Mariae (usually ascribed to Bernard of Clairvaux) and the Hours of the Cross from the Meditations on the Life of Christ. Like the Ancrene Wisse, its religious advice is written for the purpose of aristocratic women (one specific but unknown woman is addressed).

Compared to the Ancrene Wisse, however, the Treatise moves some of its contents and reorganizes them. In particular, it reorganizes the discourse to more closely follow the Passion. Central to both texts is a discussion of "four loves"—that between good friends, men and women, mother and child, and body and soul (in the order of the Ancrene Wisse). The Treatise, however, relegates the love between men and women to the final position, and spends very little time on it; indeed, direct references to carnal love found in the Ancrene Wisse are left out of the Treatise.

"Courtly tropes of wooing and marriage", commonly found in contemporary devotional tracts for women, are found in the Treatise as well. It proposes that the female audience is the recipient of love letters written by Christ; one critic referred to this rhetoric as "romance gospel", a kind of gospel in which "women readers [are represented] as beautiful and reticent ladies, the passive love objects of a courtly Christ." The Virgin Mary is likewise presented as a passionate woman, grieving over her dead son in the Passion:

Then she rose up on her feet and with very great pain faced the Cross, where she might best embrace the blessed body of Jesus Christ, whom she had formerly suckled with her own sweet breasts....And she was all splattered with the precious blood of her sweet son, the blood that fell on the earth in great quantities, which she kissed fervently with her holy mouth.

=== Table of contents ===
And see the inclination of his head to kiss you; see the spreading of his arms to embrace you; behold the opening of his fair side and the crucifying of his fair body, and with great affection of your holy love, turn it and turn it again from side to side, from the head to the feet, and you shall find that there never was sorrow or pain like that to that pain our lord Jesus Christ endured for your love.

— Tretyse of Loue, part 1.
1. The Tretyse of Loue
2. Hours of the Cross
3. Remedies Against the Seven Deadly Sins
4. The Three Signs of True Love and Friendship
5. The Branches of the Appletree
6. The Seven Signs of Jesus' Love
7. An Exhortation by Faith
8. Master Albert of Cologne's Nine Articles
9. Diverse Sayings of Saint Paul and Others
10. The Six Masters of Tribulation

== Textual origin ==
The Treatise's relationship to the Ancrene Wisse is notable, and makes the Treatise its youngest derivative in English. However, the text does not derive from any English version: it announces in its opening lines that it is translated from the French, and its language also makes it likely that the sections from the Ancrene Wisse were translated into English from a French translation of the originally English text.

== Extant copies ==
Ten copies are known to have remained; of three or four others the location is unknown. One of those copies belonged to John Moore, the Bishop of Ely whose library was bequeathed to Cambridge University. It is noteworthy that eight of those ten copies are bound together with the Chastising of God's Children, another book published by de Worde between 1491 and 1494. The copy used for the edition published by the Early English Text Society is from the Pierpont Morgan Library—it was previously owned by the Earl of Aylesford and Lord Amherst of Hackney.
