= Thomas Hoccleve =

English poet (1368/1369–1426)

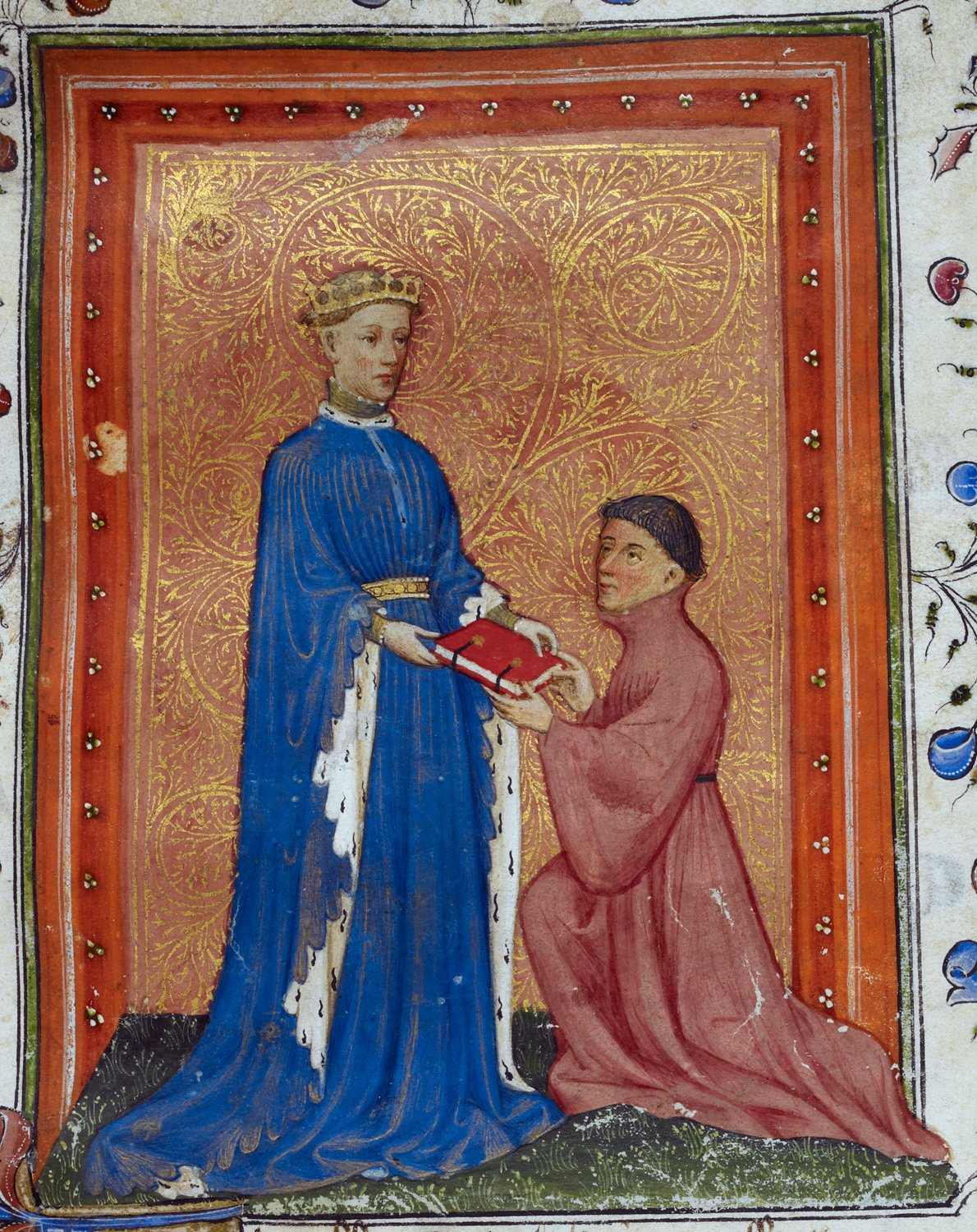
Henry V, whilst Prince of Wales, presenting Hoccleve's Regement of Princes to the Duke of Norfolk, 1411–1413, British Library

Thomas Hoccleve or Occleve (1368/69–1426) was a key figure in 15th-century Middle English literature, significant for promoting Chaucer as "the father of English literature", and as a poet in his own right. His poetry, especially his longest work, the didactic work Regement of Princes, was extremely popular in the fifteenth century, but went largely ignored until the late twentieth century, when it was re-examined by scholars, particularly John Burrow. Today he is best known for his Series, which includes the earliest autobiographical description of mental illness in English, and for his extensive scribal activity. Three holographs of his poetry have survived, and he also copied literary manuscripts by other writers. As a clerk of the Office of the Privy Seal, he wrote hundreds of documents in French and Latin.

== Biography ==
Hoccleve was born in 1368, as he states when writing in 1421 (Dialogue, 1.246) that he has seen "fifty wyntir and three". Little is known of his family, but they probably came from the village of Hockliffe in Bedfordshire. In November 1420, Hoccleve's fellow Privy Seal clerk John Bailey returned land and tenements in Hockliffe to him, which suggests that Hoccleve may indeed have retained family ties there. But records show that Hoccleve's father William Hoccleve was a Draper operating in London prior to 1365, so the poet may have been born and raised in London.

What is known of his life comes mainly from his works and from administrative records. According to the Regiment of Princes (c. 1411, 11.804–5), he obtained a clerkship in the Office of the Privy Seal at the age of eighteen or nineteen, which he retained on and off, in spite of much grumbling, for about thirty-five years. On 12 November 1399 he was granted an annuity by the new king, Henry IV. It was not always paid as regularly as he would have wished, or in full; he is known for complaining about his lack of funds.

Hoccleve is not known for his successful career. His first known, datable poem, The Letter to Cupid, was a 1402 translation of Christine de Pizan's L'Epistre au Dieu d'Amours, may have been seen as inappropriately francophile in the context of the rising English nationalism of the early 15th century, which would soon result in the resumption of hostilities in the Hundred Years War. Having failed to secure a church benefice, by 1410 he had married "only for love" (Regiment, 1.1561) and settled down to writing moral and religious poems, including his most widely circulated poem, the Regement of Princes, which he wrote c. 1411 and dedicated to the future Henry V. He was still married in November 1420 when he and his wife receive bequests in a will. The marriage was costly for his career; married clerks were traditionally unable to hold government office, and in the political instability of the early 15th century, Henry V leaned on the legitimizing power of tradition. He appears to have been something of a loner, poor at leveraging social connections in the service of his career or personal wealth. Worse still, at some point after writing the Regiment, Hoccleve experienced a period of severe mental illness. He recovered in 1415, but writes in his Complaint (1420) that five years later he continued to experience social alienation as a result. The episode caused his voice to be "publicly regarded as being unstable" – a poor quality for an author whose most successful work to date was a didactic text. In Dialogue with a Friend, the poem that follows the Complaint in his Series, he describes his worsening eyesight, which further hindered his work as a scribe.

On 4 March 1426, the Exchequer rolls record a last reimbursement to Hoccleve (for red wax and ink for office use). He died soon after: on 8 May 1426 his corrody (allowance for food and clothing) at Southwick Priory in Hampshire was passed to Alice Penfold to be held "in manner and form like Thomas Hoccleve now deceased".

== Work ==
Hoccleve, more than any other 15th-century writer, worked to cast Chaucer as the "father" of English literature, acknowledging the importance of John Gower and positioning himself as an heir of this tradition. However, despite the initial runaway success of the Regiment of Princes, his popularity was soon superseded by his more prolific contemporary, John Lydgate. Later readers found the Regiment boring and overly didactic; Caxton did not print it, and it was not until the 1970s that his work came to be valued as insight into the literate culture of England under the Lancastrian regime. It is especially valued by contemporary scholars for his frank autobiographical descriptions, in particular his description of his mental illness in the Complaint and Dialogue (1420). His La Male Regle (c. 1406), one of his most fluid and lively works, is a mock-penitential poem that gives some glimpses of dissipation in his youth.

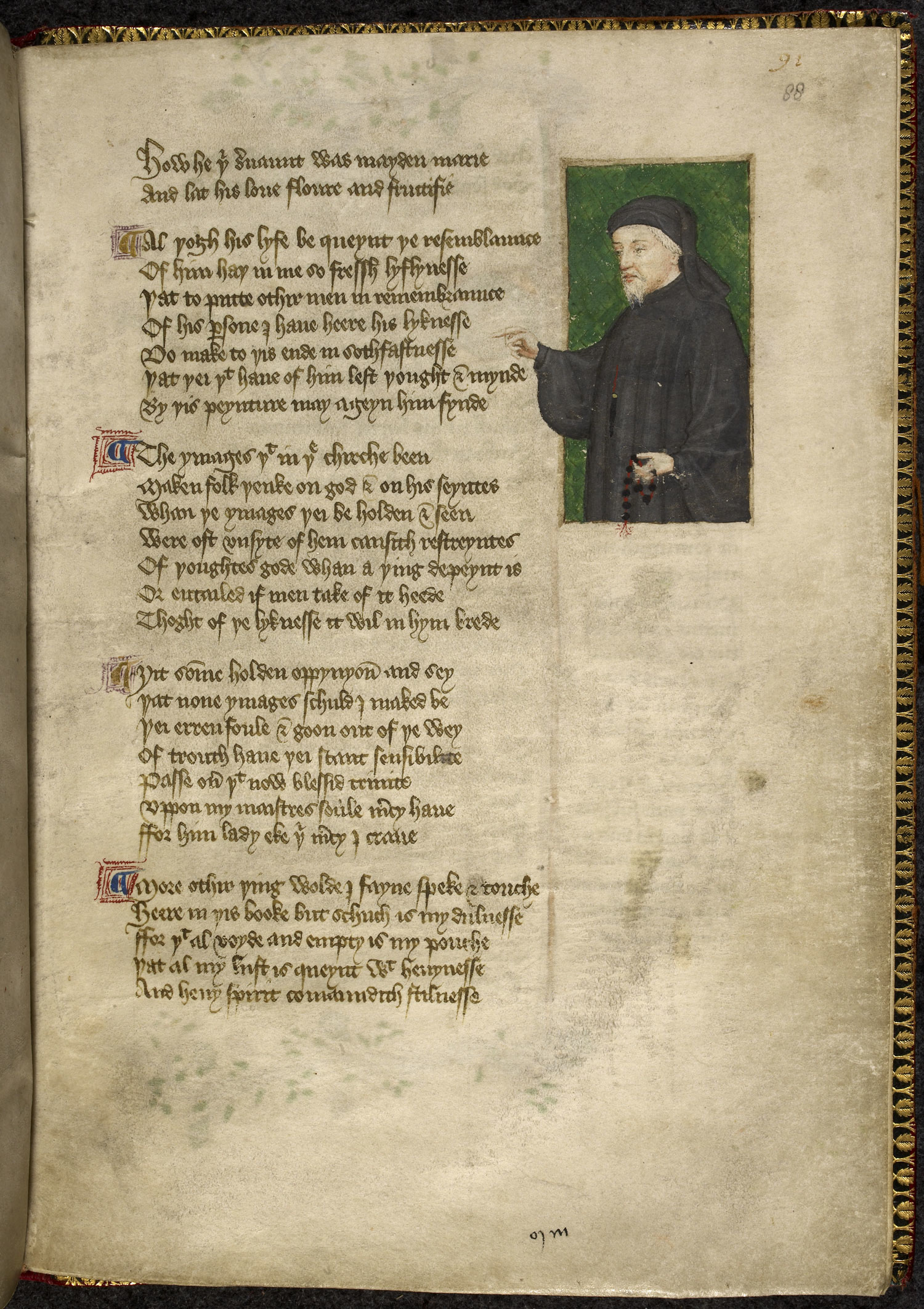
Portrait of Chaucer from Hoccleve's Regement (or Regiment) of Princes

His diction is relatively simple and clear; as a metrist he is self-deprecating. While he confesses that "Fader Chaucer fayn wolde han me taught, But I was dul and learned lite or naught", this pose was conventional in Hoccleve's time, and an inheritance from Chaucer himself, whose alter-ego Geoffrey was portrayed as fat and dimwitted in The House of Fame and The Canterbury Tales. Later known as the "humility topos", the posture would become a conventional form of authorial self-presentation in the Renaissance.

The Oxford English Dictionary cites Hoccleve as the first recorded user of many words, including annuity, causative, flexible, innate, interrupt, manual, miserable, notice, obtain, pitiless, slut and suspense.

=== The Regiment of Princes ===
The Regement of Princes, written for Henry V of England shortly before his accession, is a homily on virtues and vices, adapted from Aegidius de Colonna's Latin work of the same name, from a supposed epistle of Aristotle known as Secretum Secretorum, and from a work of Jacques de Cessoles (fl. 1300) translated later by Caxton as The Game and Playe of Chesse. The Regement survives in at least 43 manuscript copies. It comments on Henry V's lineage, to cement the House of Lancaster's claim to England's throne. Its proem, occupying about a third of the whole, contains reminiscences of London tavern life in a dialogue between the poet and an old man.

=== The Series ===
The Series, which combines autobiographical poetry, poetic translations and prose moralizations of the translated texts, begins (Complaint, 11.40 ff.) with a description of a period of "wylde infirmitee", in which the Hoccleve-character claims he temporarily lost his "wit" and "memorie" (this stands as the earliest autobiographical description of mental illness in English). He describes recovering from this "five years ago last All Saints" (Complaint, 11.55–6) but still experiencing social alienation as a result of gossip about this insanity. The Series continues with "Dialog with a Friend," which claims to be written after his recovery and gives a pathetic picture of a poor poet, now 53, with sight and mind impaired. In it he tells the unnamed friend of his plans to write a tale he owes to his good patron, Humphrey of Gloucester, and of translating a portion of Henry Suso's popular Latin treatise on the art of dying – a task the friend discourages, saying that too much study was the cause of his mental illness. The Series then fulfils this plan, continuing with moralized tales of Jereslaus' Wife and of Jonathas (both from Gesta Romanorum). The Series next turns to Learn to die, a theologically and psychologically astute verse translation of Henry Suso's Latin prose Ars Moriendi (Book II, Chapter 2 of the Horologium Sapientiae). The theme of mortality and strict calendar structure of the Series link the sequence to the death of Hoccleve's friend and Privy Seal colleague John Bailey in November 1420. Two autograph manuscripts of the Series survive.

== Handwriting ==
Hoccleve has left behind more manuscripts and documents in his own hand than any other known medieval English writer. Four literary manuscripts are generally considered to have been solely or mostly in his hand;

- Durham University Library, Cosin MS V. iii. 9 (The Series)
- San Marino, Huntington Library MSS HM 111 and HM 744 (collections of his shorter poems).
- London, British Library, MS Harley 219 (in Hoccleve's hand are extracts from the Gesta Romanorum, some of Odo of Cheriton's Fables, Christine de Pizan's Epistre Othea, and a trilingual glossary of French terms into Latin and/or English)

His hand has also been identified in sections of other literary manuscripts, as a copyist and/or corrector. He is Scribe E in Cambridge, Trinity College, MS R.3.2, John Gower's Confessio Amantis; this manuscript includes work by four other scribes, including the prolific copyist Scribe D, and Scribe B, the copyist of the Ellesmere and Hengwrt manuscripts of the Canterbury Tales. He may also be Hand F of the latter manuscript, who copied a few lines; it has been suggested that he was the first editor of Chaucer's work. Hoccleve also wrote out the majority of the Privy Seal Formulary, British Library, MS Add. 24062, and wrote hundreds of documents in his capacity as a Privy Seal clerk.

== Editions ==
Hoccleve found a 17th-century admirer in William Browne, who included his Jonathas in Shepheard's Pipe (1614). Browne added a eulogy of the poet, whose works he intended to publish in their entirety (Works, ed. W. C. Hazlitt, 1869, ii. f 96–198). In 1796 George Mason printed Six Poems by Thomas Hoccleve never before printed. De Regimine Principum was printed for the Roxburghe Club in 1860 and by Early English Text Society in 1897. (See Frederick James Furnivall's introduction to Hoccleve's Works; I. The Minor Poems, in the Phillipps manuscript 8131, and the Durham manuscript III. p, Early English Text Society, 1892.)

Furnivall's edition of Hoccleve's complete works, still largely standard for scholars, was reprinted in the 1970s; however, Michael Seymour's Selections from Hoccleve, published by the Clarendon Press (a division of Oxford University Press) in 1981, provides an excellent sampling of the poet's major and minor works for readers seeking a sense of Hoccleve's work. J. A. Burrow's 1999 Early English Text Society edition of Thomas Hoccleve's Complaint and Dialogue is becoming the standard edition of the two excerpts from the Hoccleve's later works (collectively known as The Series), as is Charles Blyth's TEAMS Middle English Text Series edition of The Regiment of Princes from the same year – particularly for modernised spelling that facilitates use in the classroom. These three recent editions all have introductions offering a thorough sense of a poet hitherto under-appreciated.
