= The Devil's Coach Horses =

1925 essay by J. R. R. Tolkien

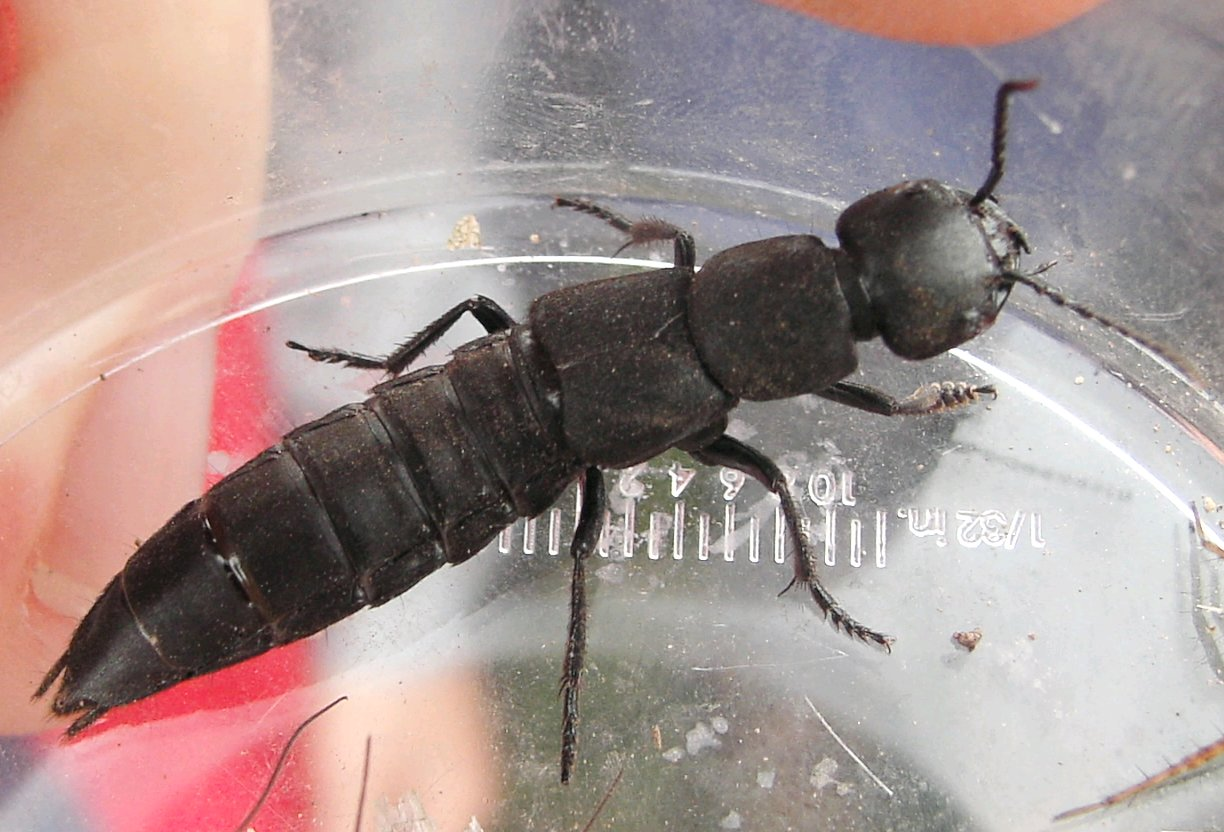
Ocypus olens, commonly known as the Devil's Coach Horse

"The Devil's Coach Horses" is a 1925 philological essay by J. R. R. Tolkien ("devil's coach horse" is the common name of a kind of rove beetle).

Tolkien draws attention to the devil's steeds called eaueres in Hali Meidhad, translated "boar" in the Early English Text Society edition of 1922, but in reference to the jumenta "yoked team, draught horse" of Joel (Joel 1:17), in the Vulgata Clementina computruerunt jumenta in stercore suo.

Rather than from the Old English word for "boar", eofor (cognate with the modern German word for boar, Eber), Tolkien derives the word from eafor "packhorse", from a verb aferian "transport", related to Middle English aver "draught-horse", a word surviving in northern dialects. The Proto-Germanic root *ab- "energy, vigour, labour" of the word is cognate to Latin opus.
