= Katherine Group =

Group of Middle English texts

The Katherine Group is a collection of five 13th-century Middle English texts composed by an anonymous author of the English West Midlands, in a variety of Middle English known as AB language.

The texts are all addressed to anchoresses (religious recluses) and praise the virtue of virginity.

== The texts ==
- The sermon Hali Meiðhad ("holy maidenhood"), directed at anchoresses or recluses, praising the virtues of virginity over worldly marriage. It was written in ca. 1182–1198 in the West Midlands of England.
- The allegory Sawles Warde ("refuge of the souls")
- Seinte Juliene, life of Juliana of Nicomedia
- Seinte Margarete, life of Margaret of Antioch
- Seinte Katherine, life of Catherine of Alexandria.

All five texts are preserved in the manuscript Oxford, Bodleian Library, Bodley 34. All except Hali Meiðhad are also in British Library, Royal 17 A XXVII. Additionally, British Library Cotton Titus D XVIII has Sawles Warde, Seinte Katherine and Hali Meiðhad.

== Editions and translations ==
=== Hali Meiðhad ===
- Early English Text Society (1922)
- A. F. Colborn (1940)
- Bella Millett (1972), ISBN 978-0-19-722286-7

=== Sawles Warde ===
- Cossio, Andoni; Goering, Nelson (2026-06-08). "J. R. R. Tolkien's Soul's Ward : A critical edition of his unpublished translation of the early Middle English homily Sawles Warde". Review of English Studies hgag038. doi:10.1093/res/hgag038. hdl:10810/79830. ISSN 0034-6551.

== Literature ==
- Fletcher, A. J. (1993) "Black, white and grey in Hali Meidhad and Ancrene Wisse: evidence for dating from mention of religious orders' habits", in: Medium Aevum (1993)
- Millett, Bella (1996) Ancrene Wisse, the Katherine Group, and the Wooing Group ISBN 0-85991-429-1
- Millett, Bella & Wogan-Browne, J. (1990) Medieval English Prose for Women: selections from the Katherine Group and Ancrene Wisse. Oxford: Clarendon Press ISBN 978-0-19-811205-1
- Tolkien, J. R. R.:
  - Holy Maidenhood (1923)
  - The Devil's Coach Horses (1925)
  - Some Contributions to Middle-English Lexicography (1925)
  - Ancrene Wisse and Hali Meiðhad (1929)
  - "Iþþlen" in Sawles Warde (1947)

== Related groups of texts ==
The Katherine Group is similar in language and content to the Ancrene Wisse and the Wooing Group.
