= Adelbert von Keller =

German philologist

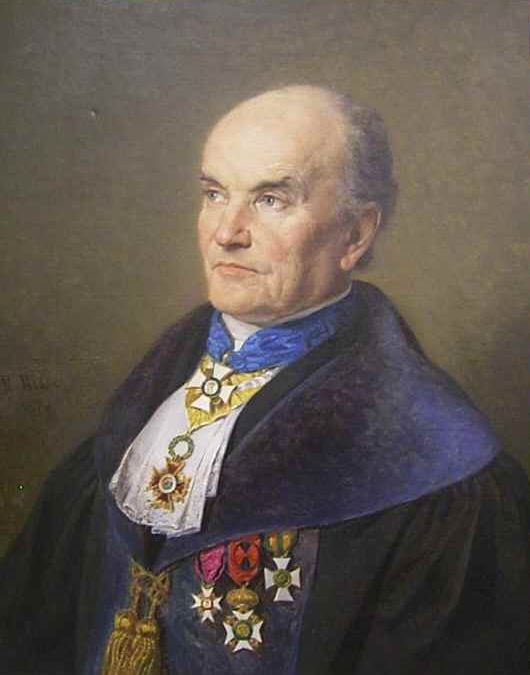

Adelbert von Keller (5 July 1812 – 13 March 1883) was a German philologist.

== Biography ==
He was born at Pleidelsheim, and educated at the University of Tübingen, where, after study at Paris, he became Privatdozent and assistant librarian (1835). After travels in Italy and research in Italian libraries, he was professor and librarian at Tübingen until 1850, when he became president of the Litterarische Verein. In this office much of his work as editor of German-language works was done, while his work in Romance languages belongs to the earlier period.

== Works ==
- Li Romans des sept sages (1836)
- Altfranzösische Sagen (Old French legends; last ed. 1876)
- a complete translation of Miguel de Cervantes (1838–42)
- Romancero del Cid (1840)
- Zwei Fabliaux (1840)
- Diokletians Leben (Life of Diocletian; 1841)
- Li romans don chevalier au leon (1841)
- Gesta Romanorum (1842)
- a translation of Shakespeare, with Moriz Rapp (1843–46)
- Rómvart (1844)
- Altdeutsche Gedichte (Old German poems; 1846)
- Alte gute Schwänke (last ed. 1846)
- Lieder Heinrichs von Württemberg (1849)
- Lieder Guillems von Burgenden (1849)
- Meister Altwerts Werke (1850)
- Italienischer Novellenschatz (A treasury of Italian novels; 1851–52)
- Fastnachtsspiele aus dem fünfzehnten Jahrhundert (1853–58)
- Ayrers Dramen (1864–65)
- Das deutsche Heldenbuch (1867)
- Hans Sachs (1870–81)
- Augustin Tüngers Facetiae (1875)
- Uhland als Dramatiker, mit Benutzung seines handscrhriftlichen Nachlasses dargestellt (Uhland as a dramatist, drawn from his manuscripts; 1877)
- Das Nibelungenlied nach der Piaristenhandschrift (1880)
- Verzeichnis altdeutscher Handschriften (edited by Eduard Sievers, 1890)
