= Einar Ólafur Sveinsson =

Icelandic academic (1899–1984)

Einar Ólafur Sveinsson, often abbreviated Einar Ól. Sveinsson (12 December 1899 – 18 April 1984), was an Icelandic scholar of Old Norse literature who was Professor of Icelandic Literature at the University of Iceland. His writings on and editions of sagas were particularly influential.

== Life and career ==
Einar Ólafur was born in Mýrdalur, where his father, Sveinn Ólafsson, was a farmer and smith. His mother was Vilborg Einarsdóttir, and he had two older brothers. He became a student at the University of Copenhagen in 1918, but earned his master's degree only in 1928, after a severe bout of tuberculosis, with a thesis on trolls in the folklore of Iceland and Norway. He received his Ph.D. in 1933 from the University of Iceland with a thesis on Njáls saga, Um Njálu.

He worked initially at the National Library of Iceland while teaching Icelandic, then became librarian of the Faculty of Arts at the university. From 1940 (the year it was formally established) to 1945 he was head of the university library, now combined with the national library as the National and University Library of Iceland. From 1945 to 1962, he was Professor of Icelandic Literature, during much of which time he was on the governing body of the university. From November 1962 through 1970 he headed the Manuscript Institute of Iceland, now the Arnemagnaean Manuscript Institute. He also had several outside duties; for example, he was on the governing board of the Icelandic Literary Society from 1952, edited its magazine, Skírnir, from 1944 to 1953, and was its president from 1962 to 1967. He died after a long illness on 18 April 1984.

He married Kristjana Þorsteinsdóttir in 1930; their son Sveinn was born in 1934. She died in 1981.

== Publications ==
Beginning with his doctoral thesis on Njáls saga, Einar Ólafur was an important exponent of the "Icelandic method" of saga studies, based on literary-historical analysis. He edited four volumes of the Íslenzk fornrit series: Laxdæla saga, Eyrbyggja saga andVatnsdæla saga in addition to Njáls saga, on which he had previously published a personal appreciation (Á Njálsbúð, 1943; published in English as Njál's Saga: A Literary Masterpiece, 1971) and a study of the manuscripts, in addition to his thesis. Among his many other books were an influential history of the Age of the Sturlungs, Sturlungaöld (1940; published in English translation 1953, also translated into Chinese), Dating the Icelandic Saga (1958), a book on the Oddaverjar (Sagnaritun Oddaverja, 1937), and in his introduction to Jónas Kristjánsson's edition of Viktors saga ok Blávus (1964) one of the most useful analyses of a fictional saga (lygisaga). He also continued to work on folklore, his first publication being a German-language index of Icelandic folk tales, followed by Um íslenzkar þjóðsögur (1940), and edited two collections of popular literature. Of his last project, a survey of medieval Icelandic literature, Íslenzkar bókmenntir í fornöld, only volume 1, on Eddic poetry, was published, in 1962. In 1968, he published a collection of his own verse, under his initials EÓS, entitled ljóð.

== Honours ==
- Honorary doctorates from the Universities of Oslo, Uppsala, Dublin and Reykjavík
- Commander, Order of the Falcon
- Chevalier, Ordre des Arts et Lettres
- Royal Swedish Order of the North Star

He was honoured in 1969 with a festschrift titled Einarsbók.

The 26 April 1984 issue of Morgunblaðið contains testimonials from many colleagues.
