= Eric John Dobson =

Australian philologist

Eric John Dobson, FBA (16 August 1913 – 31 March 1984) was an Australian philologist. He was the Professor of English Language at the University of Oxford from 1964 to 1980.

== Early life ==
Dobson was born on 16 August 1913 in New South Wales. He attended North Sydney Boys High School and then the University of Sydney, graduating with a first-class degree in English in 1934 (he won the university medal for the subject). Among other contemporary scholars in the department were A. G. Mitchell, Wes Milgate, H. J. Oliver and Neil Burgess.

After graduating, Dobson joined the English department at Sydney as a tutor in 1934; his colleagues included Mitchell, E. R. Holme, R. G. Howarth and A. J. A. Waldock. In 1935, Dobson secured the Wentworth Travelling Fellowship, allowing him to come to England to study. He completed the honours school of English at Merton College, Oxford, studying under C. L. Wrenn and Edmund Blunden and graduating with a first-class degree in 1937. He was awarded the Harmsworth Senior Scholarship which funded doctoral studies at Merton College under C. T. Onions. His research explored the pronunciation of English words in the 16th and 17th centuries; the DPhil degree was finally awarded in 1951.

== Academia ==
In the meantime, Dobson had been appointed lecturer in English at the University of Reading (1940), though he spent part of the Second World War working in Naval Intelligence. He returned to Oxford in 1948 to take up lectureships at Jesus College and St Edmund Hall. He was appointed Reader in English Language at the University of Oxford and a fellow of Jesus College in 1954. That year, his first book appeared: an edition of The Hymn to the Virgin. He also published his doctoral thesis as English Pronunciation, 1500–1700 (1957), and wrote The Phonetic Writings of Robert Robinson (1957). In 1961, he was given a personal chair at Oxford and in 1964 he was appointed to the Professorship of English Language. He edited a version of the Ancrene Wisse in 1966, authored Moralities on the Gospels (1975) and wrote The Origins of Ancrene Wisse (1976); he compiled with F. Ll. Harrison Medieval English Songs (1979) and edited Seinte Katerine with S. R. T. O. d'Ardenne in 1981. He retired from his professorship in 1980.

Dobson was elected a fellow of the British Academy in 1973 and was presented with a Festschrift, Five Hundred Years of Words and Sounds in 1983. He died on 31 March 1984.
