= AB language =

Variety of Middle English

In English philology, AB language is a variety of Middle English found in the Corpus manuscript containing Ancrene Wisse (whence "A"), and in MS Bodley 34 in Bodleian Library, Oxford (whence "B"). The Bodley manuscript includes what is known as the Katherine Group. The Wooing Group texts use this same language.

The term was coined in 1929 by J. R. R. Tolkien who noted that the dialect of both manuscripts is highly standardized, pointing to "a 'standard' language based on one in use in the West Midlands in the 13th century." AB language is "characterized by French and Norse loanwords, colloquial expressions, conservative spelling, and similarities to Old English syntax". According to Michelle M. Sauer:

While there is no general agreement among scholars as to authorship, Ancrene Wisse, the Katherine Group, and the Wooing Group are often combined, albeit loosely, into a confederation of texts. They are connected by manuscript tradition, as many of the texts appear and reappear in manuscripts in various combinations. Perhaps most significantly, there exist numerous thematic parallels among the group, including a focus on a suffering human Christ who has a personal relationship with the primarily female audience, and a connection to anchoresses. Anchoresses were women who completely withdrew from earthly life by having themselves enclosed in small cells attached to churches, from which they could never depart. They communicated with servants and visitors through a window that looked out on the churchyard, and observed Mass and received communion through a window that was directed towards the high altar. As contemplatives, the anchoresses’ primary purpose was to pray, seeking complete union with God.

== See also ==
- Mercian dialect

== Sources ==
- Corrie, Marilyn (2006). "Middle English – Dialects and Diversity". In Mugglestone, Lynda (ed.). The Oxford History of English. Oxford University Press. pp. 86–119.
- Crystal, David (2004). The Stories of English. London: Penguin Books. Chapter 9.
- Hall, Joseph, ed. (1920). Selections from Early Middle English, 1130–1250. Oxford: Clarendon Press. 2 vols.
- Tolkien, J. R. R. (1929). Garrod, H. W. (ed.). "Ancrene Wisse and Hali Meiðhad". Essays and Studies by Members of the English Association. 14. Oxford: Clarendon Press: 104–126.
- Tolkien, J. R. R., ed. (2000) [1962]. The English Text of the Ancrene Riwle: Ancrene Wisse: Edited from MS. Corpus Christi College, Cambridge 402. Early English Text Society 249. Ker, N. R. (intro.). Oxford University Press. ISBN 0-19-722249-8.
