= Viktors saga ok Blávus =

15th-century Icelandic saga

Viktors saga ok Blávus is a medieval Icelandic romance saga from the fifteenth century.

== Summary ==
Kalinke and Mitchell summarise the saga thus:

The saga relates the adventures of the foster-brothers Viktor, son of the king of France, and Blávus, a foreign prince who possesses a flying carpet. After introductory adventures involving vikings and berserks, Viktor sets off for India to sue for the hand of Fulgida, a maiden king. After Viktor has been repeatedly humiliated, Blavus travels to India disguised as a monk, cures Fulgida of a skin disease, and exchanges shapes with her so that she can travel to France without interference from her knights. Fulgida (Blávus) agrees to marry Soldán of Serkland on the condition that Rósida, Soldán's daughter, be bridesmaid. On the wedding day Fulgida (Blávus) abducts Rósida on the flying carpet and returns to Frakkland, where the marriages of Viktor to Fulgida, and Blavus to Rosida are celebrated.

== Origins ==
By identifying Middle English antecedents for some Icelandic exempla and discussing related evidence for the date of Jónatas ævintýri, Jorgensen argues that the influence of this exemplum on Viktors saga shows that Viktors saga must have been written after the beginning of English ecclesiastical influence in Iceland (ca. 1429) and before the first extant manuscript of the saga (ca. 1470)'. Moreover, the derivative Viktorsrímur fornu rhymes vá with á 'generally considered characteristic of only the oldest rímur' suggesting it's no later than c. 1450, allowing Jorgensen to date the saga to c. 1440.

Meanwhile, Jorgensen claimed that Sigurgarðs saga frækna, first attested in the last quarter of the fifteenth century, borrowed from Viktors saga. Jorgensen's work partly supersedes the study of Viktors saga’s sources and analogues by Einar Ól. Sveinsson, but Einar's study remains valuable.

== Manuscripts and transmission ==
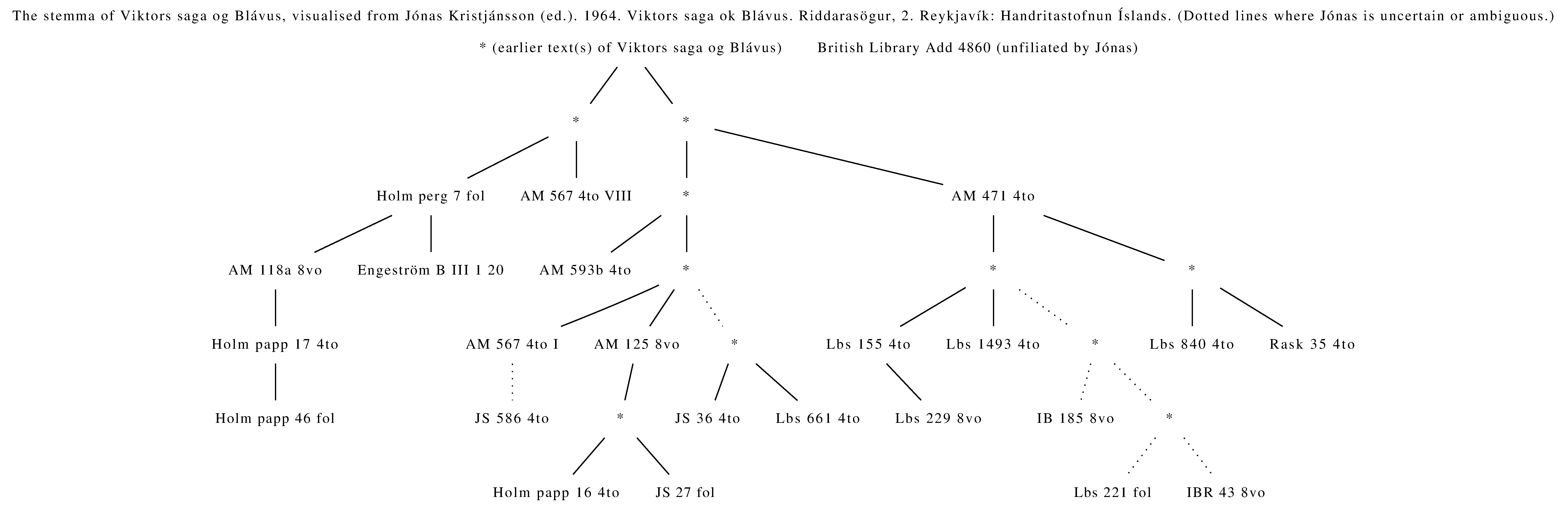
The stemma of Viktors saga og Blávus, visualised from Jónas Kristjánsson (ed.). 1964. Viktors saga ok Blávus. Riddarasögur, 2. Reykjavík: Handritastofnun Íslands. (Dotted lines where Jónas is uncertain or ambiguous.)

Kalinke and Mitchell identified the following manuscripts of the saga:

- Arnamagnaean Institute: AM 471, 4° (15th c), vellum, defective
- AM 567, 4°, I (15th c), vellum, 1 leaf; VIII (ca. 1500), vellum, 1 leaf
- AM 593b, 4° (15th c), vellum
- AM 118a, 8° (17th c)
- AM 119a, 8° (17th c), 1 leaf
- AM 125, 8° (1652)
- Rask 35 (18th c)
- The British Library, London: Add. 4860, fol. (18th c.)
- National Library, Reykjavik: Lbs 221, fol. (1819–32)
- Lbs 155,4° (ca. 1800)
- Lbs 661, 4° (1843–48)
- Lbs 840, 4° (1737)
- Lbs 1493, 4° (1880-1905)
- Lbs 3128, 4° (1884), resume
- Lbs 4484, 4° (1896)
- Lbs, 229, 8° (ca. 1860)
- JS27, fol.(ca. 1670)
- JS 36, 4° (ca. 1798)
- JS 586, 4° (1843–44)
- IB 185, 8° (ca. 1770)
- IBR 43, 8° (1848)
- University Library, Oslo: UB 1158, 8° (late 19th-early 20th c.)
- Royal Library, Stockholm: Perg. fol. nr 7 (late 15thc)
- Papp.fol. nr 46 (1690)
- Papp. 4:o nr 16 (ca. 1650)
- Papp. 4:o nr 17 (1640–71)
- Engeström B:III, 1,20, fol. (ca. 1820), excerpt from ch. 1
- University Library, Lund: LUB 14, 4° (mid-18thc)

== Editions and translations ==
- Viktors saga ok Blávus, ed. by Jónas Kristjánsson, Riddarasögur, 2 (Reykjavík: Handritastofnun Íslands, 1964)
- Late Medieval Icelandic Romances, ed. by Agnete Loth, Editiones Arnamagaeanae, series B, 20–24, 5 vols (Copenhagen: Munksgaard, 1962–65), I 1–50. Includes a detailed English paraphrase.
- 'Saga af Viktor ok Blavus': A Fifteenth Century Icelandic Lygisaga. An English Edition and Translation, ed. and trans. by Allen H. Chappel, Janua linguarum, series practica, 88 (The Hague: Mouton, 1972).
