= Wooing Group =

The Wooing Group (or Wohunge Group) is a term coined by W. Meredith Thompson to identify the common provenance of four early Middle English prayers and meditations, written in rhythmical, alliterative prose. The particular variety of Middle English in which the group is written is AB language, a written standard of the West Midlands which also characterises the Ancrene Wisse and the Katherine Group.

The group comprises:

- Þe Wohunge of ure Laured ('The Wooing of Our Lord'), a meditation "emphasizing the desirability of Christ as a lover and his sufferings to gain the love of humanity". (British Library, Cotton MS Titus D XVIII, ff. 127r–133r).
- On wel swuðe God Ureisun of God Almihti ('An Exceedingly Good Orison to God Almighty'), also a meditation on the same theme. (British Library, Cotton MS Nero A XIV; Lambeth Palace Library, MS 487, incomplete).
- On Lofsong of ure Loured ('A Song of Praise Concerning Our Lord'), "an extended prayer to Christ and the Virgin". (British Library, Cotton MS Nero A XIV).
- On Lofsong of ure Lefdi ('A Song of Praise Concerning Our Lady'), a.k.a. Þe Oreisun of Seinte Marie, "a free translation of a prayer to the Virgin in Latin verse by Marbod of Rennes (c. 1025–1133)", the 'Oratio ad sanctum Mariam'. (British Library, Cotton MS Nero A XIV).

"As with the works of the Katherine Group their dissemination seems to have been relatively limited; but the fourteenth-century rhythmical prose treatise A Talkyng of the Loue of God reflects the influence of two Wooing Group works, the Ureisun of God Almihti and the Wohunge."

In the assessment of Michelle M. Sauer:

The pieces are written in lyrical prose, and combine COURTLY LOVE imagery of Christ as the perfect lover-knight with more earthy eroticism. Similarly, the texts combine nuptial metaphors with crucifixion imagery, blending divine marriage with shared divine pain. Jesus is at once the desired spouse and the suffering savior. In particular, the title piece outlines all the qualities that Christ has that make him the perfect spouse, and these are all defined in human terms. Christ is handsome, kind, noble, wealthy, generous, and loving. The other members of the Trinity make only rare appearances. For instance, God the Father is referred to only in the context of providing Jesus with a kingdom. Similarly, the Virgin Mary is invoked as a pure, unstained advocate for the female speaker's cause, but not fleshed out as an individual figure.

== Studies ==
- Chewning, Susannah Mary (ed.), The Milieu and Context of the Wooing Group (Cardiff: University of Wales Press, 2009)
- Innes-Parker, Catherine. “Ancrene Wisse and Þe Wohunge of ure Lauerd: The Thirteenth-Century Female Reader and the Lover-Knight,” in Women, the Book, and the Godly: Selected Proceedings of the St.Hilda’s Conference, 1993, edited by Lesley Smith and Jane H. M. Taylor. Vol. 1 of 2. Cambridge: Brewer, 1995.
- Sauer, Michelle M. “‘Prei for me mi leue suster’: The Paradox of the Anchoritic ‘Community’ in Late Medieval England,” Prose Studies 26 (2003): 153–175.
- Thompson, W. Meredith, ed. Þe Wohunge of Ure Laured. Edited from British Museum MS Cotton Titus D.xviii, together with On Uriesun of Ure Lourerde; On Wel Swu´?e God Ureisun of God Almihti; On Lofsong of Ure Louerde; On Lofsong of Ure Lefdi; loe Oreisun of Seinte Marie. EETS 241. London: Published for the Early English Text Society by the Oxford University Press, 1958.
