= Israel Gollancz =

British philologist and academic

Sir Israel Gollancz FBA
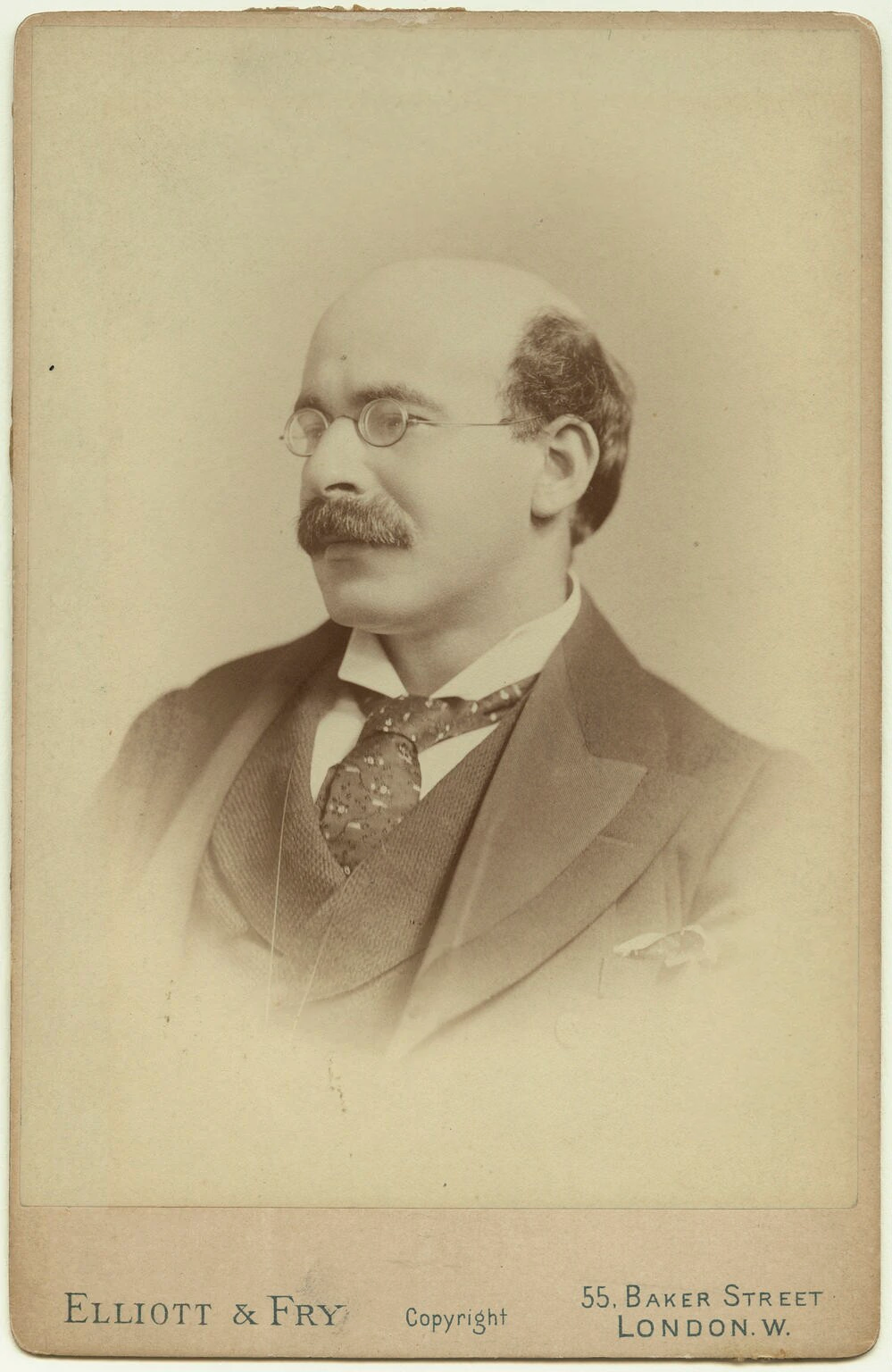
- Portrait of Sir Israel Gollancz from photographers Elliott & Fry c. 1890s
- Born: 13 July 1863; London, England
- Died: 23 June 1930 (aged 66); London, England
- Spouses: Alide Goldschmidt (m. 1910)

Sir Israel Gollancz (13 July 1863 – 23 June 1930) was a British philologist and academic who was a scholar of early English literature and of William Shakespeare. He was Professor of English Language and Literature at King's College, London, from 1903 to 1930.

== Life and career ==
Gollancz was born 13 July 1863, in London, the sixth of seven children of Rabbi Samuel Marcus Gollancz (1820–1900), cantor of the Hambro Synagogue, London, and his wife, Johanna Koppell. He was the younger brother of Sir Hermann Gollancz and the uncle of the publisher Victor Gollancz. As a Jew, Gollancz faced significant antisemitism in his life and career, which was reflected in his academic work through his recurrent interest in Shakespeare's representation of Jewishness in A Merchant of Venice. Later in his life, many of his friends knew him by the nickname "Goblin".

Gollancz was educated at the City of London School, University College London, and Christ's College, Cambridge, where he graduated with a second-class degree in the medieval and modern languages tripos in 1887. He lectured for a number of years at Cambridge University, and in 1896 was appointed the first lecturer of English there. In 1910, he married Alide Goldschmidt in London.

He was a founder member and the first Secretary (1902–1930) of the British Academy and of the committee for a Shakespeare Memorial Theatre, which eventually became the Royal National Theatre in London, and he was the Director of the Early English Text Society. He edited the "Temple" Shakespeare, a uniform edition of the complete works in pocket-size volumes which was the most popular Shakespeare edition of its day. In 1916, as Honorary Secretary of the Shakespeare Tercentenary Committee, he also edited A Book of Homage to Shakespeare, an anthology of responses to Shakespeare from scholars, thinkers and other prominent figures from around the world. He also produced a translation in modern English of the important medieval Christian allegorical poem Pearl, which he theorized may have been the work of Ralph Strode. He contributed articles to the Dictionary of National Biography. Gollancz was knighted in 1919. In 1922 he delivered the British Academy's Shakespeare Lecture.

== Death and legacy ==
Gollancz died on 23 June 1930 in London, and was buried on 26 June at the Willesden Jewish Cemetery. In the year of his death, the British Academy held a memorial lecture in his name, at which they unveiled a bust of Sir Israel. Despite this prestige, Gollancz seems to have been regarded by the succeeding generation of scholars in his field as part of an "old guard" prone to fancy and unscholarly conjecture.

He had been working on an edition of Sir Gawain and the Green Knight, which was unfinished when he died. His long-time collaborator, Mabel Day, completed the work and it was published in 1940. Mum and the Sothsegger was also completed by Day and Robert Steele and published in 1936.

The British Academy awards the Sir Israel Gollancz prize for Early English Studies.

== Obituary ==
- "Sir Israel Gollancz Early and Middle English (transcript)". The Times. London. 24 June 1930. p. 16; col D.
