= Wynkyn de Worde =

English printer and publisher (died 1534)

Portrait and printer's mark of Wynkyn de Worde. From a drawing by Fathorne.

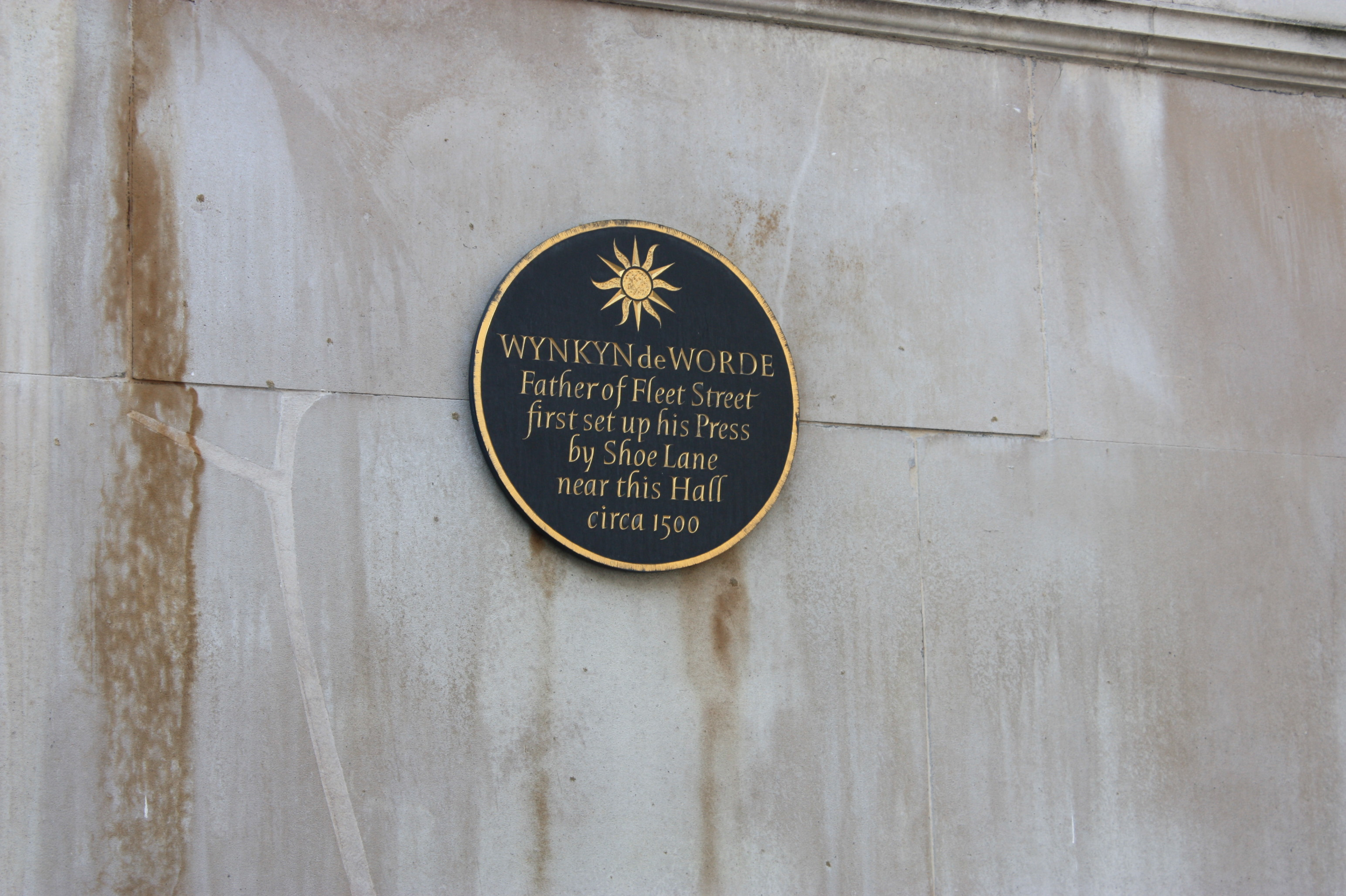
Plaque to Wynkyn de Worde, Stationers Hall, London

Wynkyn de Worde (/ˈwɪŋkɪn də ˈwɜːrd/; died 1534, London) was a printer and publisher in London known for his work with William Caxton, and is recognised as the first to popularise the products of the printing press in England.

== Name ==
Wynkyn de Worde was a German immigrant to England. His name is given in the forms Wynkyn de Worde, Wynken de Worde, Wynkyn de Word, Wijnkijn de Worde, and Winandus van Worden ("Wynkyn" is a diminutive of "Wynand"). It is also given 15 times in the sacrist's roll of Westminster Abbey and in city records as variants of "John Wynkyn", including John Wynkyn, Johannes Wynkyn, Jan Wynkyn, and Jan van Wynkyn. He is also recorded as Willelmo Wynkyn ("William Wynkyn") once and as Mr. Wylkyns eight times. His son Richard is recorded as Richard Wynkyn and Rycharde de Worde.

Some authors have therefore concluded that his real name was John Wynkyn (or Wynand) and that "de Worde" was "merely a place name", while others have concluded that his real name was Wynkyn (or Wynand) de Worde and that "John" was an added name: "It is… possible that John Wynkyn was an Anglicized alias devised by de Worde himself for occasional use—though why, and for what occasions, remains obscure."

== Life and work ==
De Worde was likely born in either Wörth an der Sauer in Alsace or Wörth am Rhein in the Palatinate. Traditionally, he was believed to have accompanied William Caxton to England in 1476; more recently, it has been argued that de Worde actually arrived around 1481, and that Caxton brought him to England to counter the competition of a second printer, John Lettou, who set up a press in London in 1480. Sometime while in England, de Worde married a woman named Elizabeth. De Worde improved the quality of Caxton's product; he was, in this view, "England's first typographer". In 1495, following Caxton's death in 1492 and a three-year litigation, de Worde took over Caxton's print shop.

De Worde is generally credited for moving English printing away from its late-medieval beginnings and toward a "modern" model of functioning. Caxton had depended on noble patrons to sustain his enterprise; while de Worde enjoyed the support of patrons too (principally Margaret Beaufort, mother of King Henry VII), he shifted his emphasis to the creation of relatively inexpensive books for a commercial audience and the beginnings of a mass market. Where Caxton had used paper imported from the Low Countries, de Worde exploited the product of John Tate, the first English papermaker. Manuscripts that served as early printer's copy, studied by Gavin Bone was the earliest attempt to identify and examine setting copy for an incunable edition of a Middle English work. De Worde published more than 400 books in over 800 editions (though some are extant only in single copies and many others are extremely rare). His greatest success, in terms of volume, was the Latin grammar of Robert Whittington, which he issued in 155 editions. Religious works dominated his output, in keeping with the tenor of the time; but de Worde also printed volumes ranging from romantic novels to poetry (he published the work of John Skelton and Stephen Hawes), and from children's books to volumes on household practice and animal husbandry. He innovated in the use of illustrations: while only about 20 of Caxton's editions contained woodcuts, 500 of Wynkyn de Worde's editions were illustrated.

He moved his firm from Caxton's location in Westminster to London; he was the first printer to set up a site on Fleet Street (1500), which for centuries became synonymous with printing. He was also the first person to build a book stall in St Paul's Churchyard, which soon became a centre of the book trade in London. The site of Wynkyn de Worde's press is marked by a plaque on the wall of the hall of the Worshipful Company of Stationers off Ludgate Hill and Ave Maria Lane, near St Paul's Cathedral in London.

De Worde was the first to use italic type (1528) and Hebrew and Arabic characters (1524) in English books; and his 1495 version of Polychronicon by Ranulf Higden was the first English work to use movable type to print music. These musical notes, created using non-musical symbols, are often cited as the first instance of music printing in England. For a long time, De Worde was mistakenly attributed with a songbook from 1530 (frequently named after him), which is considered one of the greatest examples of music printing of that era.

His name lives on via the Wynkyn de Worde Society, founded in the United Kingdom in 1957 for "people dedicated to excellence in all aspects of printing and the various stages of its creation, production, finishing and dissemination".

== Published works ==
Books printed by Wynkyn de Worde include:

- Treatise of Love
- Le Morte d'Arthur
- Vitae Sanctorum Patrum
- Scala perfectionis (1494)
- Bartholomaeus de Proprietatibus Rerum by John Trevisa (1495)
- The Chastising of God's Children
- Dives and Pauper
- The Book of Saint Albans
- The Canterbury Tales
- Contemplacyon of sinners by William Touris
- Mandeville's Travels
- Beves of Hamtoun
- Guy of Warwick
- The Squire of Low Degree
- Robin Hood
- The Miracles of Our Lady
- Golden Legend
- Ordynarye of Crysten Men
- The Rote or mirror of Consolation
- The Twelve profits of tribulation
- The Bowge of Court by John Skelton
- The History of the Three Kings of Cologne
- The Ship of Fools (1509)
- Cocke Lorells Bote (1509)
- Mundus et Infans (1522)
- Gesta Romanorum
- Christmasse Carolles
- Richard Coer de Lyon
- Nova Legenda Angliae

== Additional Reading ==
Smyth, Adam. 2024. "Printing: Wynken de Worde (d. 1534/5)," pp. 7– 43 in The Book-Makers : A History of the Book in Eighteen Lives. First US hardcover edition. New York: Basic Books.
