= Sigrgarðs saga frœkna =

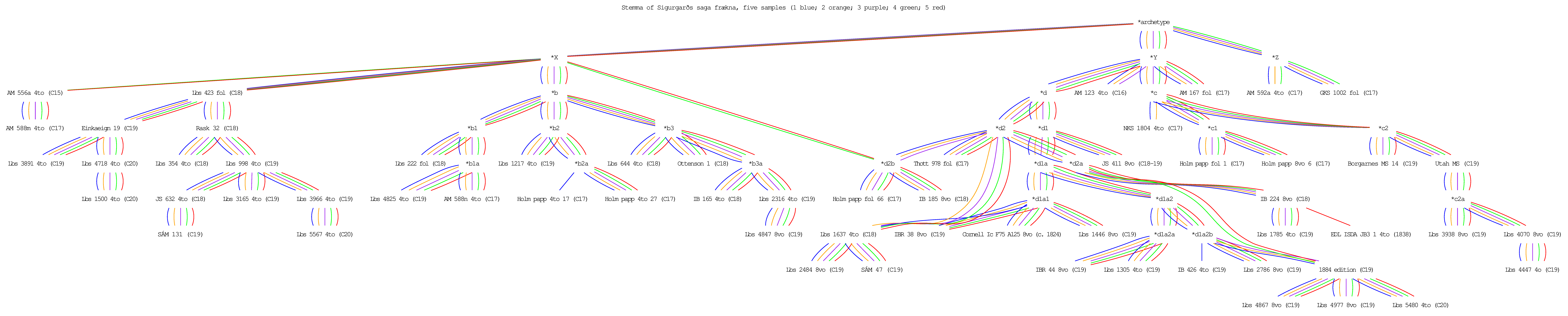
Stemma of Sigrgarðs saga frœkna based on fifty-eight witnesses

Sigrgarðs saga frœkna (modern Icelandic Sigurgarðs saga frækna, the saga of Sigrgarðr the Valiant) is a medieval Icelandic romance-saga, described by Finnur Jónsson as 'all in all ... one of the best and most worthy of reading' of the Icelandic 'stepmother-sagas'.

== Plot and literary character ==
The plot of the saga was summarised by Marianne E. Kalinke and P. M. Mitchell:

Ingigerðr, queen of Taricia, and her two sisters, Hildr and Signý, are suffering from a spell placed on them by Hlégerðr, their father's concubine. No suitor can please Ingigerðr, while Hildr and Signý are turned into animals. When Sigrgarðr, a king's son, woos Ingigerðr, she repeatedly makes a fool of him. He leaves Taricia only to return disguised as a merchant. Ingigerðr outwits him when he attempts to abduct her by means of a flying carpet. Finally Sigrgarðr, posing as the viking Knútr, visits Ingigerðr with two foster-brothers. The three succeed in breaking the spells. The saga concludes with a triple wedding.

Notwithstanding Kalkinke and Mitchell's summary, most manuscripts of the saga set Ingigerðr's kingdom not in 'Taricia' but 'Tartaria' (i.e. Tartary), and it has been argued that the lost original manuscript of the saga must likewise have read Tartaria.

While the saga 'has a lot of rough edges' in its style and plotting, it has nonetheless been characterised as 'tightly and powerfully structured', 'throw[ing] itself with unswerving commitment into a wonder-tale of stepmothers and foster-brothers, curses, flying carpets, deception, disguise, shape-shifting, trolls, and bedroom antics'.

The saga has attracted particular critical commentary because of its handling of gender and sexual politics: it is particularly noteworthy amongst romance-sagas because the moral standing of the main male character is questionable. Before beginning to woo Ingigerðr, Sigrgarðr has previously developed a habit of seducing and discarding women; the degradations which he suffers at her hands can, therefore, be understood as comeuppance for his immorality.

== Sources and influences ==
The saga draws on Viktors saga ok Blávus and Bósa saga ok Herrauðs. More distant similarities with other texts—both medieval ones and later folktales—indicate that the saga draws on oral story-telling traditions, with some details arguably indicating oral links with medieval Irish and Welsh traditions.

== Manuscripts and date ==
The saga is attested in at least sixty-one manuscripts, dating from the fifteenth century through to the early twentieth, mostly from Iceland, apparently all descended from a lost common original.

The earliest surviving manuscript is Reykjavík, Stofnun Árna Magnússonar, AM 556a-b 4to, from the later fifteenth century, known as Eggertsbók. Peter Jorgensen found that the saga must originally have been composed around 1450×75.

The following list of manuscripts is based on the survey by Hall and others. Links to online catalogue entries are provided where available.

Location	Classmark	date	catalogue entry URL	notes
Reykjavík, Stofnun Árna Magnússonar	AM 123 8vo	c. 1600	http://handrit.is/is/manuscript/view/AM08-0123 FASNL	fragmentary
Reykjavík, Stofnun Árna Magnússonar	AM 167 fol	c. 1660	http://handrit.is/is/manuscript/view/AM02-0167	
Reykjavík, Stofnun Árna Magnússonar	AM 556a 4to	C15	http://handrit.is/is/manuscript/view/AM04-0556a	fragmentary
Reykjavík, Stofnun Árna Magnússonar	AM 588m 4to	C17	https://handrit.is/en/manuscript/view/is/AM04-0588m	
Reykjavík, Stofnun Árna Magnússonar	AM 588n 4to	C17	https://handrit.is/en/manuscript/view/is/AM04-0588n	
Reykjavík, Stofnun Árna Magnússonar	AM 592a 4to	C17	http://handrit.is/is/manuscript/view/en/AM04-0592-a FASNL	fragmentary
Héraðskjalasafn Borgarfjarðar, Borgarnes	MS 14 / Einkaeign 10	1862-1867	https://handrit.is/en/manuscript/view/is/Einkaeign-0010 FASNL	
Reykjavík, Stofnun Árna Magnússonar	GKS 1002 fol	C17	http://handrit.is/is/manuscript/view/GKS02-1002-1003	
Reykjavík, National Library of Iceland	ÍB 165 4to	1778	http://handrit.is/is/manuscript/view/IB04-0165 FASNL	
Reykjavík, National Library of Iceland	ÍB 185 8vo	1760-1780	https://handrit.is/is/manuscript/view/IB08-0185 FASNL	
Reykjavík, National Library of Iceland	ÍB 224 8vo	c. 1750	https://handrit.is/en/manuscript/view/is/IB08-0224 FASNL	
Reykjavík, National Library of Iceland	ÍB 426 4to	1877	http://handrit.is/is/manuscript/view/IB04-0426	fragmentary
Reykjavík, National Library of Iceland	ÍBR 38 8vo	1828-1831	http://handrit.is/is/manuscript/view/IBR08-0038 FASNL	
Reykjavík, National Library of Iceland	ÍBR 44 8vo	1854	http://handrit.is/is/manuscript/view/IBR08-0044	
Reykjavík, National Library of Iceland	JS 411 8vo	late C17	http://handrit.is/is/manuscript/view/JS08-0411 FASNL	
Reykjavík, National Library of Iceland	JS 632 4to	1799-1800	http://handrit.is/is/manuscript/view/JS04-0632 FASNL	
Reykjavík, National Library of Iceland	Lbs 1217 4to	1817	http://handrit.is/is/manuscript/view/Lbs04-1217 FASNL	
Reykjavík, National Library of Iceland	Lbs 1305 4to	1869-1878	http://handrit.is/is/manuscript/view/Lbs04-1305	
Reykjavík, National Library of Iceland	Lbs 1446 8vo	1864-1871	http://handrit.is/is/manuscript/view/Lbs08-1446	
Reykjavík, National Library of Iceland	Lbs 1500 4to	1880	https://handrit.is/en/manuscript/view/is/Lbs04-1500 FASNL	
Reykjavík, National Library of Iceland	Lbs 1637 4to	1760-1800	FASNL	
Reykjavík, National Library of Iceland	Lbs 1785 4to	1833		
Reykjavík, National Library of Iceland	Lbs 222 fol	1695-1698	http://handrit.is/is/manuscript/view/Lbs02-0222 FASNL	
Reykjavík, National Library of Iceland	Lbs 2316 4to	1850	FASNL	
Reykjavík, National Library of Iceland	Lbs 2484 8vo	c. 1852	https://handrit.is/manuscript/view/is/Lbs08-2484	
Reykjavík, National Library of Iceland	Lbs 2786 8vo	1869		
Reykjavík, National Library of Iceland	Lbs 3165 4to	1870-1871	https://handrit.is/en/manuscript/view/is/Lbs04-3165 FASNL	
Reykjavík, National Library of Iceland	Lbs 354 4to	C18	http://handrit.is/is/manuscript/view/Lbs04-0354 FASNL	
Reykjavík, National Library of Iceland	Lbs 3891 4to	late C19		
Reykjavík, National Library of Iceland	Lbs 3938 8vo	1872		
Reykjavík, National Library of Iceland	Lbs 3966 4to	1869-1871	https://handrit.is/en/manuscript/view/is/Lbs04-3966	
Reykjavík, National Library of Iceland	Lbs 4070 8vo	1862		
Reykjavík, National Library of Iceland	Lbs 423 fol	C18	http://handrit.is/is/manuscript/view/Lbs02-0423 FASNL	
Reykjavík, National Library of Iceland	Lbs 4447 4to	1868-1869		
Reykjavík, National Library of Iceland	Lbs 4718 4to	1875	https://handrit.is/en/manuscript/view/is/Lbs04-4718	
Reykjavík, National Library of Iceland	Lbs 4825 4to	c. 1775-1825	http://handrit.is/is/manuscript/view/Lbs04-4825 FASNL	
Reykjavík, National Library of Iceland	Lbs 4847 8vo	1868-1874	https://handrit.is/en/manuscript/view/is/Lbs08-4847	
Copenhagen, Matthew Driscoll	Einkaeign 19	1875	https://handrit.is/en/manuscript/view/is/Einkaeign-0019	
Reykjavík, National Library of Iceland	Lbs 4867 8vo	1870	https://handrit.is/en/manuscript/view/is/Lbs08-4867	
Reykjavík, National Library of Iceland	Lbs 4977 8vo	1896	https://handrit.is/en/manuscript/view/is/Lbs08-4977	
Reykjavík, National Library of Iceland	Lbs 644 4to	1710-1750	https://handrit.is/manuscript/view/is/Lbs04-0644 FASNL	
Reykjavík, National Library of Iceland	Lbs 998 4to	late C19	https://handrit.is/manuscript/view/is/Lbs04-0998 FASNL	
Reykjavík, National Library of Iceland	Lbs 5480 4to	C20	https://handrit.is/en/manuscript/view/is/Lbs04-5480	
Reykjavík, National Library of Iceland	Lbs 5567 4to	1913	https://handrit.is/en/manuscript/view/is/Lbs04-5567	
Reykjavík, National Library of Iceland	Lbs 5767 4to	1911	https://handrit.is/manuscript/view/is/Lbs04-5767 (formerly Böðvar Kvaran, Tjaldanes MS I 2.b)	
Copenhagen, Royal Library	NKS 1804 4to	1681	FASNL	fragmentary
Stockholm, Royal Library	Islandica papp fol 1	early C17	FASNL, facsimile	
Stockholm, Royal Library	Islandica papp 4to 17	1640-1671	FASNL, facsimile	fragmentary
Stockholm, Royal Library	Islandica papp 4to 27	c. 1650	https://skaldic.abdn.ac.uk/db.php?id=15161&if=default&table=mss	
Stockholm, Royal Library	Islandica papp 8vo 6	1674	FASNL	
Stockholm, Royal Library	Islandica papp fol 66	1690	https://onp.ku.dk/onp/onp.php?m10901	
Copenhagen, Arnamagnæan Institute	Rask 32	later C18	http://handrit.is/is/manuscript/view/en/Rask032 FASNL	
Reykjavík, Stofnun Árna Magnússonar	SÁM 47	1867-1868	http://handrit.is/is/manuscript/view/SAM-0047	
Reykjavík, Stofnun Árna Magnússonar	SÁM 131	1871-1890	https://handrit.is/en/manuscript/view/is/SAM-0131	
Copenhagen, Royal Library	Thott 978 2o	late C17	https://skaldic.abdn.ac.uk/db.php?id=15043&if=default&table=mss	
Winnipeg, Elizabeth Dafoe Library	ISDA JB3 6 8vo	1838		fragmentary
Ithaca, New York, Cornell University, Fiske Icelandic Collection	Ic F75 A125, 8vo	C18		
Baltimore, Md, Johns Hopkins University, Nikulas Ottenson Collection	MS Nr. 1	1798	https://catalyst.library.jhu.edu/catalog/bib_1425614	
New Haven, Conn., Yale University, Beinecke Library	Z 113.82	1806	http://hdl.handle.net/10079/bibid/1222356	
Jón Ófeigsson, Hafnarnes, Hornafjörður	MS 1	C19		
Reykjavík, Stofnun Árna Magnússonar	AM 576b 4to	1690-1710	https://handrit.is/en/manuscript/view/is/AM04-0576b FASNL	résumé
Copenhagen, Royal Library	NKS 1144	late C18	FASNL	résumé

Two manuscripts are listed by Kalinke and Mitchell as containing Sigurgarðs saga frækna which actually contain Sigurgarðs saga og Valbrands: Lbs 1496 4to (1883) and Lbs 2319 4to (1727-1729). Likewise, Handrit.is lists Lbs 4547 8vo as containing Sigurgarðs saga frækna, also incorrectly.

== Editions and translations ==
- Einar Þorðarson (ed.), Sagan af Sigurgarði frœkna (Reykjavík: Einar Þorðarson, 1884), http://www.alarichall.org.uk/teaching/sigrgardssaga.php. [A popular reading edition.]
- Agnete Loth (ed.), Late Medieval Icelandic Romances, Editiones Arnamagæanae, series B, 20–24, 5 vols Copenhagen: Munksgaard, 1962–65), V 39–107. [The principal scholarly edition.]
- Alaric Hall, Steven D. P. Richardson, and Haukur Þorgeirsson (ed. and trans.), ‘Sigrgarðs saga frækna: A Normalised Text, Translation, and Introduction’, Scandinavian-Canadian Studies/Études Scandinaves au Canada, 21 (2013), 80–155, http://scancan.net/article.htm?id=hall_1_21. [A normalised Old Icelandic text, and English translation, based on Loth's edition.]
