= Ancrene Wisse and Hali Meiðhad =

1929 essay by J. R. R. Tolkien

"Ancrene Wisse and Hali Meiðhad" is a 1929 essay by J. R. R. Tolkien on the thirteenth century Middle English treatise Ancrene Wisse ("The Anchoresses' Rule") and on the tract on virginity Hali Meiðhad ("Holy Maidenhood"). The essay has been called "the most perfect though not the best-known of Tolkien's academic pieces". Tolkien and Neil Ripley Ker later edited a volume of the text for the Early English Text Society.
