= Gesta Romanorum =

13th or 14th-century Latin collection of anecdotes and tales

Gesta Romanorum (/ˈdʒɛstə roʊməˈnɔːrəm/; "Deeds of the Romans") is a Latin collection of anecdotes and tales that was probably compiled about the end of the 13th century or the beginning of the 14th. It still possesses a two-fold literary interest, first as one of the most popular books of the time, and secondly as the source, directly or indirectly, of later literature, in Geoffrey Chaucer, John Gower, Giovanni Boccaccio, Thomas Hoccleve, William Shakespeare, and others.

Of its authorship nothing certain is known. It is conjecture to associate it either with the name of Helinandus or with that of Petrus Berchorius (Pierre Bercheure). It is debated whether it originated in England, Germany or France.

== Content ==
The work was evidently intended as a manual for preachers, and was probably written by one of the clerical profession. The name, Deeds of the Romans, is only partially appropriate to the collection in its present form, since, besides the titles from Greek and Latin history and legend, it comprises fragments of different origins, Asian and European. The unifying element of the book is its moral purpose, but the work contains a variety of material. It includes, for example:

- the germ of the romance of Guy of Warwick;
- the story of the three caskets, as in The Merchant of Venice;
- the story of Darius and his Three Sons, versified by Thomas Occleve as The Tale of Jonathas;
- part of Geoffrey Chaucer's Man of Lawes Tale;
- a version of the Crescentia cycle, similar to (though more piously phrased than) Le Bone Florence of Rome;
- a tale of the emperor Theodosius, the same in its main features as that of Shakespeare's King Lear;
- the first known medieval appearance of the story of The Dead King and his Three Sons
- the story of the Three Black Crows
- the Hermit and the Angel, later known from Thomas Parnell's version;
- a story identical with the Fridolin of Schiller;
- the story of Jonathan and the three jewels (a predecessor to Fortunatus);
- a retelling of the Man Tried by Fate, a story also known in the legends of Saint Eustace and chivalric romances such as Sir Isumbras;
- a version of Apollonius of Tyre.

== Manuscripts ==
Owing to the loose structure of the book, it was easy for a transcriber to insert any additional story into his own copy, and consequently the manuscripts of the Gesta Romanorum exhibit considerable variety. Hermann Oesterley recognizes an English group of manuscripts (written always in Latin), a German group (sometimes in Latin and sometimes in German), and a group which is represented by the vulgate or common printed text.

== Early printed editions and translations ==
The earliest printed editions are those of Nicolaus Ketelaer and Gerardus de Leempt at Utrecht, of Arnold Hoenen at Cologne, and of Ulrich Zell at Cologne; but the exact date is in all three cases uncertain. In his preface to the 1905 revised and corrected edition, Wynnard Hooper writes that "according to Herr Oesterley [...] all three editions [...] appeared between 1472 and 1475."

An English translation, probably based directly on the manuscript Harl. 5369, was published by Wynkyn de Worde about 1510–15, the only copy of which now known to exist is preserved in the library of St John's College, Cambridge. In 1577 the London printer Richard Robinson published a revised edition of Wynkyn de Worde, as Certain Selected Histories for Christian Recreations, and the book proved highly popular.

Between 1648 and 1703 at least eight impressions were issued. In 1703 appeared the first vol. of a translation by BP, probably Bartholomew Pratt, from the Latin edition of 1514. A translation by the Rev. Charles Swan, first published in 2 vols in 1824, forms part of Bohn's Antiquarian Library, and was re-edited by Wynnard Hooper in 1877 (see also the latter's edition in 1894).

A Welsh translation was completed by Llywelyn Sion in the late sixteenth or early seventeenth century.

The German translation was first printed at Augsburg, 1489. A French version, under the title of Le Violier des histoires romaines moralisez, appeared in the early part of the 16th century, and went through a number of editions; it has been reprinted by Pierre-Gustave Brunet (Paris, 1858).

== Critical Latin editions ==
Critical editions of the Latin text have been produced by Adelbert von Keller (Stuttgart, 1842), Hermann Oesterley (Berlin, 1872), and Philippa Bright (Oxford, 2019, editing the version that circulated in England). See also:

- Warton, "On the Gesta Romanorum", dissertation iii., prefixed to the History of English Poetry
- Douce, Illustrations of Shakespeare, vol. ii.
- Frederic Madden, Introduction to the Roxburghe Club edition of The Old English Versions of the Gesta Romanorum (1838).

== Modern translations ==
- English: Gesta Romanorum: A New Translation, trans. Christopher Stace (Manchester, 2016); also, Gesta Romanorum, translated by Charles Swan, with corrections by Wynnard Hooper (London, 1905).
- Portuguese: Gesta Romanorum (Os Feitos dos Romanos) (selection), trans. Scott Ritter Hadley, (n.t.) Revista Literária em Tradução, nº 1 Sept, 2010, (Florianópolis, Brazil, 2010) ISSN 2177-5141
- Ukrainian: Знамениті оповідки з діянь римських, trans. Rostyslav Paranko (2024), Діяння римські. Український переклад збірки Gesta Romanorum (in Ukrainian) ISBN 978-617-629-846-5
- Spanish: Gesta Romanorum: exempla europeos del siglo XIV, trans. Ventura de la Torre and Jacinto Lozano Escribano (2004). ISBN 8446012642, 9788446012641
- Swedish: Gesta Romanorum (selection), trans. Hannah Bartonek Åhman (Skellefteå, 2020). ISBN 978-91-7777-104-3.

== See also ==
- Matter of Rome
- De mulierum subtili decepcione
