= William Browne (poet) =

- Born: 1590; Tavistock, Devon
- Died: 1645 (aged c. 55)
- Occupation: poet
- Notable work: Britannia's Pastorals (1613); The Shepherd's Pipe (contributing author, 1614)

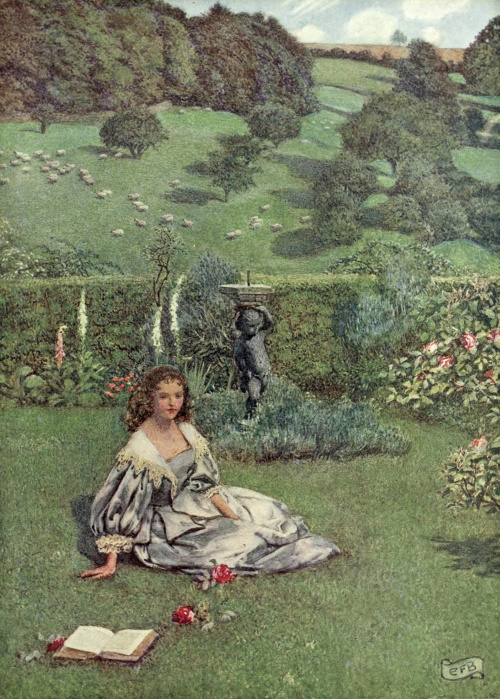
Illustration by Eleanor Fortescue-Brickdale

William Browne (c. 1590 – c. 1645) was an English pastoral poet, born at Tavistock, Devon, and educated at Exeter College, Oxford; subsequently he entered the Inner Temple.

His chief works were the long poem Britannia's Pastorals (1613), and a contribution to The Shepherd's Pipe (1614). Britannia's Pastorals was never finished: in his lifetime, Books I & II were published successively in 1613 and 1616. The manuscript of Book III (unfinished) was not published until 1852. The poem is concerned with the loves and woes of Celia, Marina, etc.

To him is due the epitaph for the dowager Countess of Pembroke ("Sidney's sister, Pembroke's mother").
