= Robert Steele (medievalist) =

Robert Steele (1860–1944) was a British scholar, best known for editing between c. 1905 and 1941 the 16-volume Opera hactenus inedita Rogeri Bacon.

Early in his life Steele was a disciple of William Morris, who was apparently influential in directing young Steele's attention towards studying medieval writings, and also attracted Steele's political views towards socialism. After studying chemistry, Steele was for a brief time a teacher of this subject at Bedford School. He soon abandoned this job and moved to London where he worked as a freelance journalist, writing for various literary and socialist publications. He became a member of the Fabian Society.

One of his early works, with a preface by Morris, was Mediaeval lore from Bartholomew Anglicus, a selective modernization of a medieval encyclopedia, edited—according to George Bernard Shaw's review—"with a nice sense of how much modern readers are likely to stand." Steele's first major work on medieval manuscripts was The Earliest English Arithmetics, published with the help of the Early English Text Society. Later he published Early English Music Printing with the Bibliographical Society. He was able to visit France, Italy, and Russia; the latter visit helped him write The Art of the Russian Icon published with the Medici Society.

His publications of Bacon's works attracted funding from several learned societies, as well as a Civil List Pension and an Honorary Doctorate from Durham University. He was also one of the early Executive Members of the International Academy of the History of Science. His house and personal library were destroyed in a German air raid in 1941. He had ten children.

Steele's edition of Bacon's Secretum secretorum, with its lengthy introduction and numerous notes, is seen as the modern basis for its study by English scholars. However, Steele's view that Bacon's reading of the Secretum was the turning point towards experimentalism in Bacon's philosophy is viewed with skepticism by later scholars like S.J. Williams, who nonetheless acknowledge the special place that the Secretum played in Bacon's own writings.
