= Early English Text Society =

British learned society & publishing house

- Abbreviation: EETS
- Formation: 1864; 162 years ago
- Type: Text publication society
- Purpose: The publication of Old and Middle English literary texts
- Headquarters: Oxford, United Kingdom
- Region served: United Kingdom
- Honorary Director: Helen L. Spencer
- Website: http://www.eets.org.uk/

The Early English Text Society (EETS) is a text publication society founded in 1864 which is dedicated to the editing and publication of early English texts, especially those only available in manuscript. Most of its volumes contain editions of Middle English or Old English texts. It is known for being the first to print many important English manuscripts, including Cotton Nero A.x, which contains Pearl, Sir Gawain and the Green Knight, and other poems.

== History ==
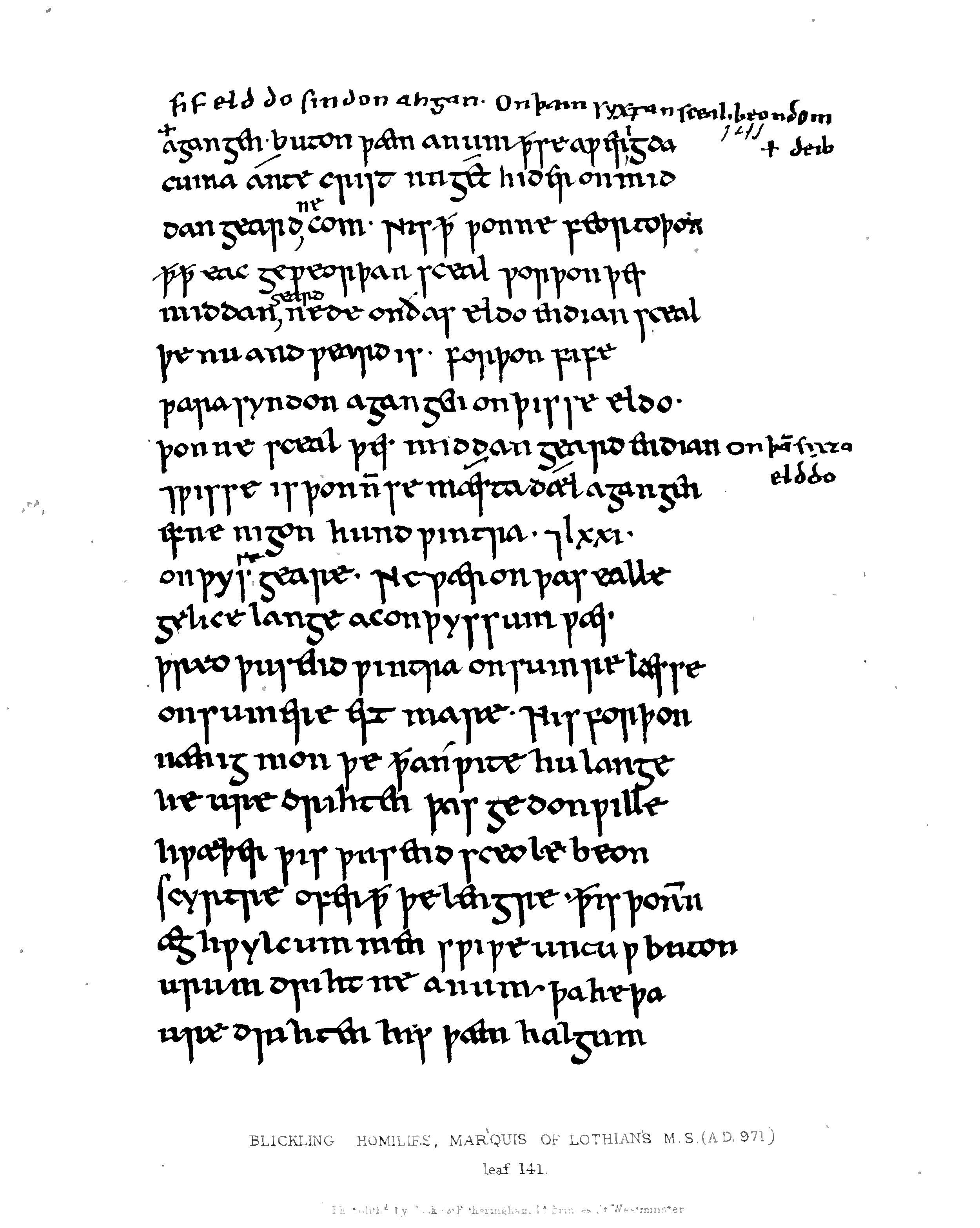
A page of the Blickling Homilies in facsimile, as reproduced in The Blickling Homilies of the Tenth Century: from the Marquis of Lothian's unique MS A.D. 971, edited and translated by Richard Morris, EETS o.s. vols 58, 63, 73 (1874–80)

The Society was founded in England in 1864 by Frederick James Furnivall. Its stated goal was "on the one hand, to print all that is most valuable of the yet unprinted MSS. in English, and, on the other, to re-edit and reprint all that is most valuable in printed English books, which from their scarcity or price are not within the reach of the student of moderate means."

In 1921 Mabel Day became the assistant director of the EETS. She is remembered for her work with the EETS and with Sir Israel Gollancz who was its director. Mabel Day kept the EETS financially viable until 1947.

In 1935 the EETS decided to publish editions of the Ancrene Wisse, a fourteenth-century text also known as the A Guide for Anchoresses. Day advised on several editions and she worked on the Nero MS version. The principles which she established are said to have governed all the later editors.

Gollancz died in 1930. He had been working on Sir Gawain and the Green Knight and this was unfinished when he died. Day modestly completed the work and it was published in 1940. Another of his works, Mum and the Sothsegger, was also completed by Day and Robert Steele and published in 1936.

== Progress ==
As of 2026, the Society had published 366 volumes in its Original Series; 126 volumes in its Extra Series, published between 1867 and 1935, comprising texts previously printed, but only in unsatisfactory or rare editions; and 25 volumes in its Supplementary Series, an occasional and irregular series initiated in 1970. The Society keeps the majority of its older publications in print, except those which have been superseded by subsequent editions. Volumes are now published on behalf of the Society by Oxford University Press.

== Notable members ==
Notable members of the society when it was formed in 1864 included Furnivall himself, the Rev. Richard Morris (the editor of 12 volumes between 1862 and 1880), Walter Skeat (philologist), Alfred Tennyson (poet laureate), Warren De la Rue (astronomer, chemist, and inventor), Richard Chenevix Trench (Irish ecclesiastic).

Recent honorary directors have included Anne Hudson (2006–2013); Vincent Gillespie (2013–2023); and Helen L. Spencer (2023–present).

== Logo ==
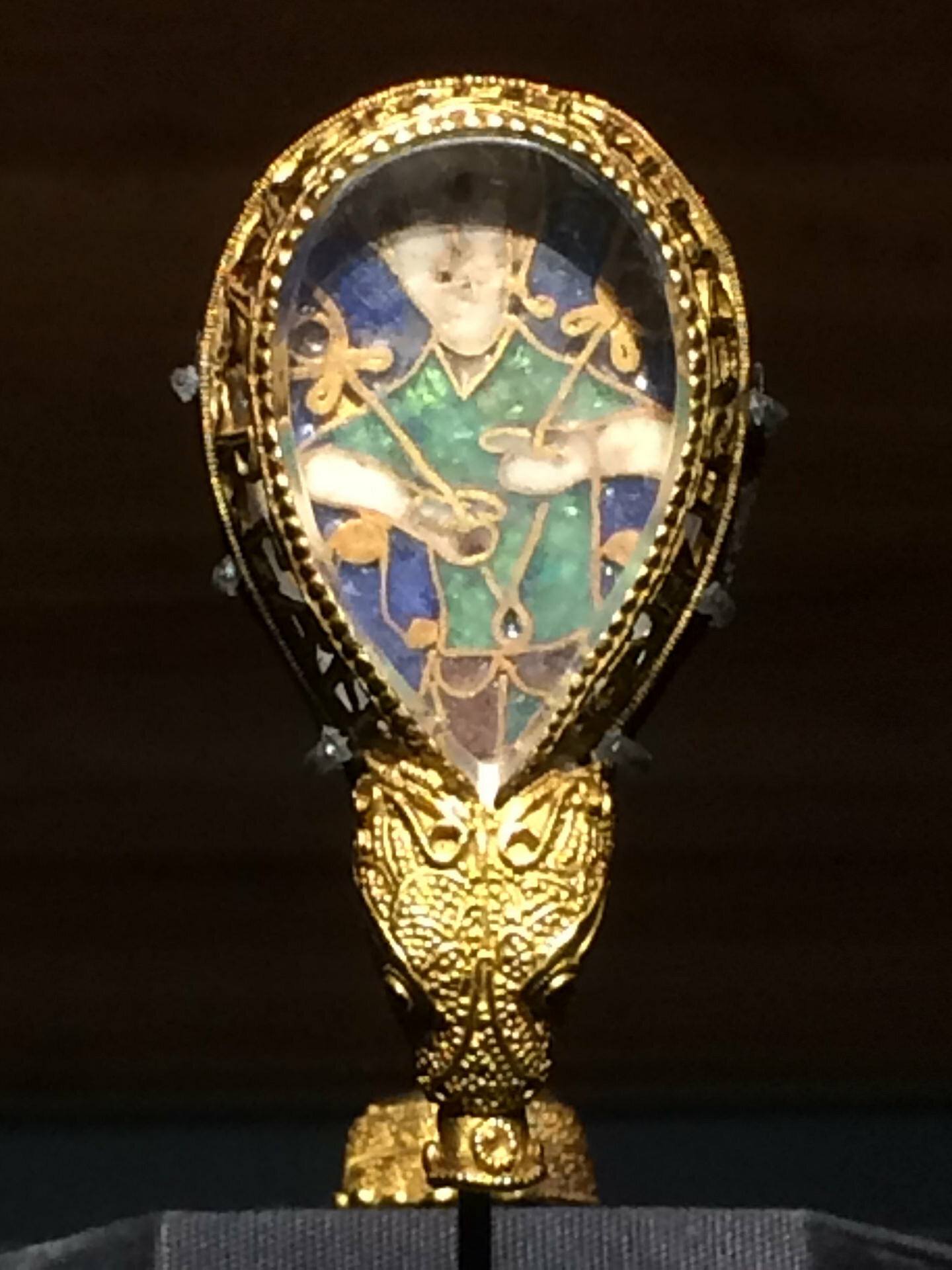
The Alfred Jewel

The Society emblem is a representation of the enamel plaque of the Anglo-Saxon Alfred Jewel, omitting its gold frame, but with an added scroll bearing the Society's name.

== Cultural references ==
- A. N. Wilson's novel Wise Virgin (1982) centres on Giles Fox, a blind scholar who has spent 20 years editing the Tretis of Loue Heuenliche, a 13th-century tract on virginity, for publication by the EETS.

== See also ==
- Aelfric Society, London publisher of Anglo-Saxon texts, 1842–1856
